= Mohamed Nasheed =

President of the Maldives from 2008 to 2012

Mohamed Nasheed GCSK
- މުހައްމަދު ނަޝީދު
- Official portrait, 2008

4th President of the Maldives
- In office 11 November 2008 – 7 February 2012
- Vice President: Mohamed Waheed Hassan
- Preceded by: Maumoon Abdul Gayoom
- Succeeded by: Mohamed Waheed Hassan

19th Speaker of the People's Majlis
- In office 28 May 2019 – 13 November 2023
- President: Ibrahim Mohamed Solih
- Deputy: Eva Abdulla
- Preceded by: Qasim Ibrahim
- Succeeded by: Mohamed Aslam

Member of the People's Majlis
- In office 28 May 2019 – 28 May 2024
- Preceded by: Constituency established
- Succeeded by: Ahmed Xamyr
- Constituency: Central Mahchangolhi

Chairperson of the Maldivian Democratic Party
- Incumbent
- Assumed office 14 June 2026
- Preceded by: Fayyaz Ismail
- In office 26 June 2005 – 20 February 2008
- Succeeded by: Mariya Ahmed Didi

President of the Maldivian Democratic Party
- In office 1 August 2014 – 21 June 2023
- Preceded by: Ibrahim Didi
- Succeeded by: Ibrahim Mohamed Solih

Personal details
- Born: 17 May 1967 (age 59) Malé, Maldives
- Party: Maldivian Democratic Party (2003–2023; 2025–present)
- Other political affiliations: The Democrats (2023–2025)
- Spouse(s): Laila Ali Abdulla (m. 1994–2021) Yumna Rushdi (m. 2024)
- Children: 2
- Education: Liverpool John Moores University
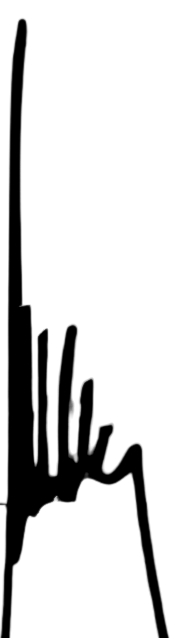
- Signature
- Nickname: Anni

Mohamed Nasheed (Dhivehi: މުހައްމަދު ނަޝީދު; born 17 May 1967), also known as Anni (Dhivehi: އަންނި), is a Maldivian politician and activist who served as the fourth president of the Maldives from 2008 until his controversial resignation in 2012. A founding member of the Maldivian Democratic Party, he subsequently served as the 19th speaker of the People's Majlis from 2019 until his resignation in 2023. He is the first democratically elected president of the Maldives and the only president to resign from office.

Born in Malé, Nasheed was educated overseas before returning to the Maldives and becoming involved in political activism. He was first elected to Parliament in 1999 but was later removed from office, and was arrested and imprisoned several times during his early career. His arrest in 2005 prompted civil unrest. In the first round of the 2008 presidential election, he won 25% of the votes and later defeated incumbent President Maumoon Abdul Gayoom.

As the President, Nasheed played a role in drawing international attention to the threat of climate change to the Maldives. His government focused on anti-corruption measures, free healthcare, political and press freedom.

On 7 February 2012, Nasheed resigned amidst a political crisis. Protests by the opposition began after he allegedly ordered the arrest of Criminal Court Chief Judge Abdulla Mohamed. Nasheed characterised the circumstances of his resignation as a coup d'état. His successor, Mohamed Waheed Hassan, disputed this, saying the process was constitutional, which a Commission of National Inquiry confirmed.

Nasheed unsuccessfully ran for the presidency in 2013. In 2015, Nasheed was convicted under the Anti-Terrorism Act for ordering the arrest of Mohamed and sentenced to 13 years at Maafushi Prison. Nasheed was later granted asylum by the UK government in 2016 after he went there for medical treatment.

In November 2018, the Supreme Court overturned his conviction following Ibrahim Mohamed Solih's win in the 2018 presidential election. Nasheed returned to the Maldives and was elected to the parliament in 2019 for the Central Mahchangolhi constituency, subsequently taking office as the Speaker of the People's Majlis.

On 6 May 2021, an assassination attempt was carried out against Nasheed near his home. He sustained serious injuries after an IED bomb stuffed with bearing balls was detonated as he was getting into his car. He was treated in an intensive care unit in a German military hospital, after undergoing multiple emergency surgeries. Two were convicted for the attack.

== Early life ==
Mohamed Nasheed was born on 17 May 1967 in Malé, Maldives, to a middle-class family. He attended Majeediyya School in the Maldives from 1971 to 1981. He then studied at the Overseas School of Colombo in Sri Lanka from 1981 until 1982, when he moved to England and completed his secondary education at Dauntsey's School. Straight after his GCE A Levels, Nasheed moved north to Liverpool, where he spent the next three years reading maritime studies at Liverpool Polytechnic, before graduating in 1989.

Following his return to the Maldives in the late 1980s, he founded the Sangu magazine, which published a series of investigative reports about President Maumoon Abdul Gayoom's regime. On 24 November 1990, Nasheed was arrested following an article he published in Sangu about the corruption of the Maldivian government and the alleged government interference in the 1989 general election. He was taken to Dhoonidhoo detention centre, where he was held in solitary confinement for eighteen months. He stated that he was tortured while in detention, including being chained to a chair outside for twelve days and forced to eat food containing crushed glass. In 1991, Nasheed was designated as a prisoner of conscience by Amnesty International.

He was sentenced on 8 April 1992 for three years over an alleged conspiracy to explode a device at a South Asian Association for Regional Cooperation (SAARC) conference, which he denied. Additionally, he was sentenced to four months for talking to unauthorized people during his house arrest and six months for endangering the peace and stability of the country. He appealed his sentence in 1993 to the High Court before being rejected. However, he was later released from prison in Gamadhoo in June. Nasheed married Laila Ali Abdulla in 1994, and had two children, Meera Laila Nasheed, and Zaya Laila Nasheed. Nasheed remarried in January 2024 to Yumna Rushdi.

Nasheed was re-arrested on 30 November 1994 and detained for eight days. He was charged with two offences under Sections 88A and 125 of the Maldives Penal Code following accusations that he spread false and derogatory information about the government. The charge was related to an article he published in a Philippine magazine where he criticised election procedures in the 1993 presidential election and the 1994 general election. His passport was confiscated by the authorities. Nasheed was arrested on 27 February 1995 again on charges of contempt of court after he refused to leave court premises unless the judge issued him a passport to leave the country for a short trip abroad. He was sent to Dhoonidhoo detention centre before being transferred to Gaamadhoo Prison. Hearings in his trial were completed in May 1995. He was on house arrest until 3 April 1996 when he was sentenced to two years for sedition and defamation of the state. During his sixteen times in jail, he missed the births of both his daughters and spent significant amounts of time studying, producing three books on Maldivian history.

== Early political career ==
During the 1999 general election, Nasheed was elected as the member of the People's Majlis representing Malé. However, he was stripped of his seat following a theft charge that the BBC described as politically motivated. Six months after Nasheed entered parliament, the government sentenced him to 2 1/2 years exile to Angolhitheemu for taking "government property" from Velaanaage. He sent an appeal to the High Court, which was denied in March 2002 and the conviction was upheld. He was officially expelled from the Majlis on grounds that he had been absent for more than six months. Nasheed was transferred to house arrest in June and was released in August but denied his seat in the Majlis.

In November 2003, Nasheed left the Maldives and helped to establish the Maldivian Democratic Party (MDP) along with Mohamed Latheef, in self-exile, in Sri Lanka. He moved to the UK and was recognised as a political refugee in April 2004 and given indefinite leave to remain there. On 30 April 2005, he ended his self-imposed exile and returned to Malé.

On 12 August 2005, Nasheed was arrested after he was sitting in the centre of the Republic Square along with supporters of the MDP, to mark the anniversary of Black Friday, a crackdown by the National Security Service on a nonviolent anti-government protest. Nasheed's arrest ignited civil unrest in Malé, Gaafu Dhaalu Atoll, and Addu Atoll. Nasheed was taken to Dhoonidhoo Detention Centre and according to eyewitnesses he was beaten badly. After Nasheed was arrested, acting government spokesperson Mohamed Hussain Shareef stated in an interview to Reuters that Nasheed was not arrested and that he would be released soon. On 22 August, Nasheed was charged with terrorism and sedition for "inciting violence against the president" in a speech made in July.

== Presidency ==
=== 2008 presidential election ===
Mohamed Nasheed in 2010

In the 2008 presidential election, Nasheed ran for the post of president on an MDP ticket, with Mohamed Waheed Hassan from Gaumee Itthihaad as the vice presidential candidate; this was the first time the country had held a multiparty presidential election by popular vote. Nasheed's campaign focused on political freedom and rooting out corruption under the Gayoom administration. He also promised greater media freedom and increasing democracy in the country. In the first round, Nasheed and Hassan placed second with 44,293 votes (24.91%), behind President Gayoom of the governing Dhivehi Rayyithunge Party (DRP), who received 71,731 votes (40.34%).

In the second round of elections, Nasheed and Hassan were backed by the unsuccessful first round of candidates. They won with 54.25% of the vote against 45.75% for Gayoom. Following the election, Nasheed and Hassan were sworn in as the President and Vice President of the Maldives on 11 November 2008, in a special session of the People's Majlis at Dharubaaruge.

=== Cabinet ===
President Nasheed's first cabinet included fourteen ministers. Some posts in the cabinet were given to politicians from the "Watan Edhey" coalition, which included the MDP, the Adhaalath Party (AP), and the Jumhooree Party (JP). President Nasheed dissolved the Supreme Council for Islamic Affairs and established the Ministry of Islamic Affairs.

Within four months of the first cabinet being formed, President of the JP, Qasim Ibrahim resigned as the Home Minister. This was subsequently followed by the dismissal of the President of the Dhivehi Qaumee Party, Hassan Saeed, who withdrew support of the government accusing the MDP of irresponsible behaviour and not consulting its allies. The AP, which was the remaining party in the coalition, cut ties with MDP following a resolution passed by the party to annul the agreement. This followed criticism of the government's handling on various issues such as normalising relations with Israel, corruption within the government, and regulations permitting sale of alcohol to non-muslims on inhabited islands. By the end of the first year of his presidency, President Nasheed's cabinet contained only ministers from his own party and Vice President Hassan's Gaumee Itthihaad.

=== Policies ===
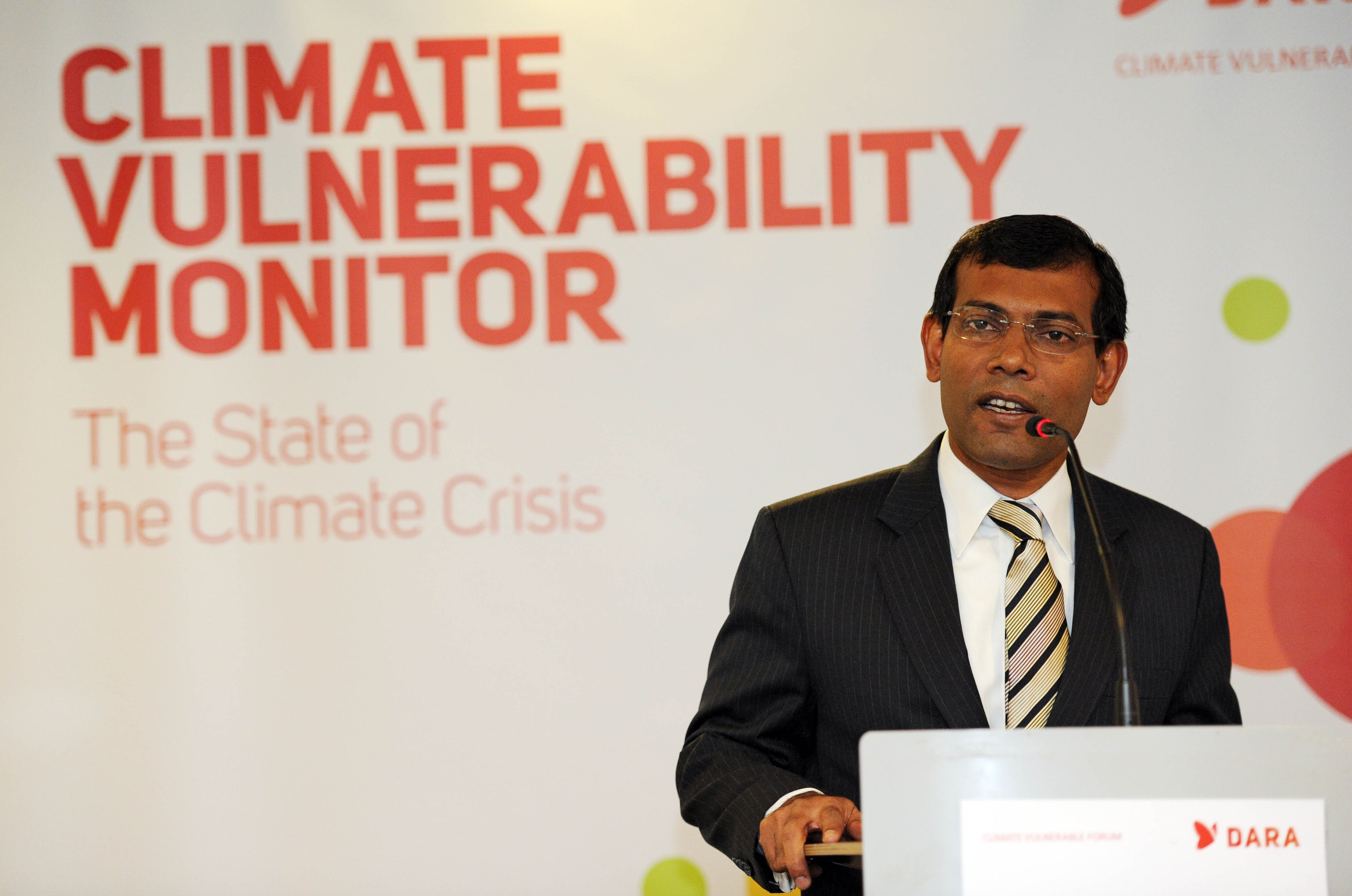
Nasheed at the launch of the Climate Vulnerability Monitor

With regard to the threat posed to the very low-lying islands by changes in sea level caused by global warming, in March 2009 Nasheed pledged to set an example by making the Maldives carbon-neutral within a decade by moving to wind and solar power. He argued that the cost of the change would be no higher than what the Maldives already spends on energy. As of 2024, renewable energy accounts for 6% of total electricity generation in the country. As part of a wider campaign by international environmental NGO 350.org's campaign publicising the threats of climate change and its effects on the Maldives, Nasheed presided over the world's first underwater cabinet meeting on 17 October 2009, off the island of Girifushi with the meeting participants underwater in scuba diving gear. The following month, Nasheed founded the Climate Vulnerable Forum, an association of countries affected disproportionately by climate change. A documentary about Nasheed's efforts to halt climate change, The Island President, was filmed throughout 2008 and 2009.

Nasheed's other priorities were anti-corruption measures, government decentralization, and measures to increase freedom of expression and the press. His government introduced draft bills which guaranteed freedom of expression and the press, which remained under consideration by the Majlis. Nasheed's administration also started the Aasandha health insurance scheme. His government established the Maldives National University, pensions for the elderly, improved transportation among the islands, and social housing. His administration focused on reducing drug users, which saw a decline in the import of hard drugs along with two detoxification centres; reducing cost of living as inflation decreased in 2009 compared to the previous year; affordable housing, with the government planning to construct 10,000 housing units, along with providing clean water, sewerage and electricity.

=== Resignation ===
On 23 December 2011, a coalition formed against Nasheed organised a major protest in Malé against him and his government, calling to defend Islam. The Chief Judge of the Criminal Court Abdulla Mohamed was summoned to the police after he released a protestor from jail. He was later arrested by the Maldives National Defence Force (MNDF) against a court order, which ordered Mohamed not to obey the summon. Opposition parties called for his release and staged protests everyday with judicial and international bodies calling for his release, along with Vice President Mohamed Waheed Hassan. Nasheed alleged that Mohamed was arrested on charges of protecting Gayoom and said that he did not like arresting a judge but could not let him remain on the bench.

The opposition staged protests at the Republic Square, with police officers joining them on 6 February. On 7 February, Nasheed resigned as the President, with his Vice President, Mohamed Waheed Hassan being sworn in as the President. Nasheed stated that he believed if he continued as President, the country would further suffer. However, he later claimed that he was forced to resign at gunpoint and that it was a coup d'état organized by former President Gayoom and his loyalists along with Hassan. A warrant was issued for Nasheed's arrest by the Criminal Court immediately after his resignation, with the charges being hidden. Hassan ordered the warrant to not be carried out unless it was necessary for Nasheed's personal safety. He was surveilled by the police at an undisclosed location after alcohol bottles were found inside a truck removing waste from Muliaage, the presidential residence.

The coup interpretation was also backed by UK MP David Amess, Chairman of the All Party Parliamentary Group to the Maldives, but contradicted by UK Prime Minister David Cameron, who asserted that Nasheed "had resigned". Chief of Defence Force Moosa Ali Jaleel stated that he believed Nasheed had "no choice but to resign", along with MNDF intelligence chief Brigadier General Ahmed Nilam, who stated that the events on 7 February fulfilled all features of a coup. Nasheed's successor and opposition forces claimed that the transfer of power was voluntary. The Indian and U.S. governments recognized Hassan's government as legitimate, which Nasheed found "shocking". The Commonwealth of Nations concluded in a meeting it could not "determine conclusively the constitutionality of the resignation of President Nasheed", but called for an international investigation and early elections.

A Commission of National Inquiry was established by Hassan on 21 February to investigate events that transpired from 14 January–8 February 2012, including the transfer of power. The commission's report on 30 August, ruled that the transfer of power was voluntary and the report was endorsed by many international organizations such as the United Nations and foreign countries like the UK and US. The MDP accused the report of being one-sided and protests followed.

== Post-presidency ==
=== 2013 presidential election ===
Nasheed ran for the presidency again in the 2013 election, which was mired by controversy as voting was delayed three times. Nasheed's manifesto highlighted plans to introduce a saving scheme for higher education, a student loan scheme, accommodation flats, an MVR 20,000 allowance for single parents and persons with special needs, and the elderly, and introducing 50,000 job opportunities. He won the first round with 45.45% of the vote, but fell short of the 50% needed for a majority. A scheduled run-off vote was cancelled after the Supreme Court annulled the results of the first round due to irregularities. In a rescheduled second round vote, Abdulla Yameen secured 51.3% of the vote compared to Nasheed's 48.6%. Nasheed conceded defeat.

=== Trials ===
Nasheed was charged for illegally ordering the arrest of Abdulla Mohamed, although in April 2012, he stated he was unaware of the official charges against him. In September, he was put on trial; however, his trial was cancelled without explanation. Nasheed was again arrested in October for ignoring a court summons and violating a travel ban. He was detained overnight and then released on the condition that he would answer questions about his alleged abuse of presidential powers within 25 days.

Nasheed took refuge in the Indian High Commission office in Malé in February 2013 after a Maldivian court issued an arrest warrant against him. On 5 March 2013, he was arrested on the charges of abuse of the office but was released a day later after his court hearing concluded.

In February 2015, Nasheed was arrested again and ordered to stand trial for his decision to arrest Abdulla Mohamed. The Prosecutor General later withdrew the unlawful arrest charge and added a new charge of terrorism. Nasheed's lawyers quit in protest against what they alleged was a biased trial which was aimed to destroy his political career. The court rejected an objection from Nasheed's lawyers that two of the judges were not suitable to hear the case because they had testified against Nasheed at a police inquiry on the judge's arrest. The court later ruled Nasheed guilty of terrorism and sentenced him to 13 years in Maafushi Prison.

Amnesty International condemned the conviction and called the trial flawed, echoing calls from the International Commission of Jurists, and the UN Human Rights Commissioner Zeid bin Ra'ad. The Indian Ministry of External Affairs stated that they were concerned and were monitoring the situation and the United States Department of State echoed similar concerns over the apparent "lack of appropriate criminal procedure". In October 2015, a UN human rights panel found that Nasheed's detention was arbitrary, which the Maldivian government refused to adhere to the decision.

On 16 January 2016, following foreign pressure, Nasheed was granted permission by the Maldivian government to leave for the UK to undergo spinal surgery. Nasheed's lawyer, Amal Clooney, drew UK Prime Minister David Cameron's attention regarding Maldivian democracy and its shortcomings. The former president requested an additional 60-day leave extension that was temporarily rejected by the Maldivian authorities. In April, the United States Senate adopted a bipartisan resolution calling for the Maldivian government to redress the "injustice of Nasheed's imprisonment". In May, the UK government granted Nasheed political refugee status.

On 5 May, Nasheed announced that he would be leading a "united opposition" partnership in London alongside Mohamed Jameel Ahmed, with the latter being established as the leader. This opposition coalition, named the Maldives United Opposition, included MDP, the AP, Yameen's former deputies Mohamed Jameel Ahmed and Ahmed Adeeb, and his former defence minister Mohamed Nazim. In June, the Supreme Court upheld Nasheed's 13-year sentence following a government appeal saying that Nasheed's lawyers did not have adequate time to prepare.

In 2018, for that year's presidential election, Nasheed ran in the MDP's primary and secured the party's ticket. However, the Elections Commission called the primary unlawful and threatened to dissolve MDP, saying that Nasheed is ineligible due to his 13-year prison sentence. The United Nations Human Rights Committee said that Nasheed should be allowed to run and gave the Maldivian government a deadline. Nasheed later gave up the ticket and was replaced by MP Ibrahim Mohamed Solih. Solih later defeated Yameen in the election and was sworn in as the President on 17 November. In October, the Prosecutor General asked the Supreme Court to review Nasheed's guilty verdict, with a stay order being issued. The court concluded the review on 19 November and determined on 26 November that Nasheed was wrongfully charged and the case should not have gone to trial.

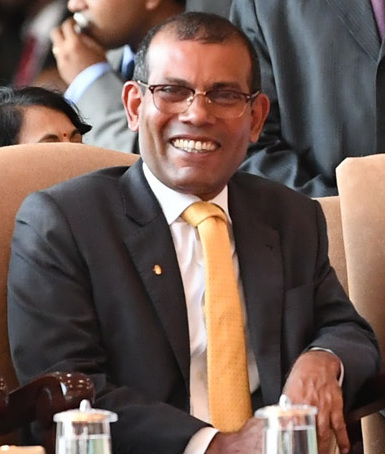
Nasheed in November 2018

=== Speaker of the People's Majlis ===
Nasheed returned to the Maldives on 1 November 2018 and was greeted by supporters wearing his party's yellow colour. He was received by his best friend and colleague President Ibrahim Mohamed Solih.

Nasheed ran in the 2019 parliamentary election for the Central Machchangolhi constituency, where he won with 1136 out 2039 voters. On 28 May, Nasheed was elected as Speaker of the People's Majlis with 67 votes in favour out of 84.

Due to pandemic restrictions in 2020, Nasheed oversaw a transition to online parliamentary sessions from March through May. The "Virtual Chamber" setup allowed all MPs to participate remotely, with parliamentary media staff hosting the livestream.

During Nasheed's time as the Speaker, he campaigned for constitutional reform and the adoption of a federal system, and proposed that the creation of a constitutional monarchy be considered. He also planned to create a super committee to evaluate nominees by the president that require parliamentary approval, which was rejected. He landed in a controversy after he accused China of stealing Maldivian land and putting the country into debt-trap, which Chinese Ambassador Zhang Lizhong denied. In August 2021, Nasheed had called for the Maldives to invest in projects to mitigate coastal erosion. He called for debt restructuring to fund adaption measures, build embankments, and water breakers, saying the country would not be able to afford to protect islands without it.

Nasheed spoke at the 2021 United Nations Climate Change Conference, demanding that world leaders do not compromise on the 1.5 °C climate target. He later criticised China for its role in the conference, saying that the country ignored the planet and the climate. In 2023, Nasheed's attendance of the conference was featured in the BBC documentary series Planet Earth III. In 2024, Nasheed became the Secretary General of the Climate Vulnerable Forum, an organization he helped create, and moved to Ghana to start work. He completed his term in 2026.

In June 2023, the MDP MPs filed a no confidence motion against Nasheed, with members being concerned about how he had been conducting the parliamentary session, like how he handled the no confidence motion against Attorney General Ibrahim Riffath. They later withdrew the motion. In October, a new no confidence motion was filed against him, alleging repeated irregular conduct of meetings. The no confidence vote was later stalled as Deputy Speaker of the Majlis and Nasheed's cousin, Eva Abdulla, called in sick. The MDP accused Nasheed and Abdulla of stalling the vote. The MDP later filed a case at the Supreme Court, which ruled that the motion was halted in violation of the law. Nasheed resigned on 13 November before the vote took place.

=== Assassination attempt ===
On Thursday, 6 May 2021 at 20:39 MVT (UTC+5), Nasheed was the target of an assassination attempt that also wounded three members of his security detail and two bystanders. A device fixed to a motorbike was detonated as Nasheed entered a car outside his home.

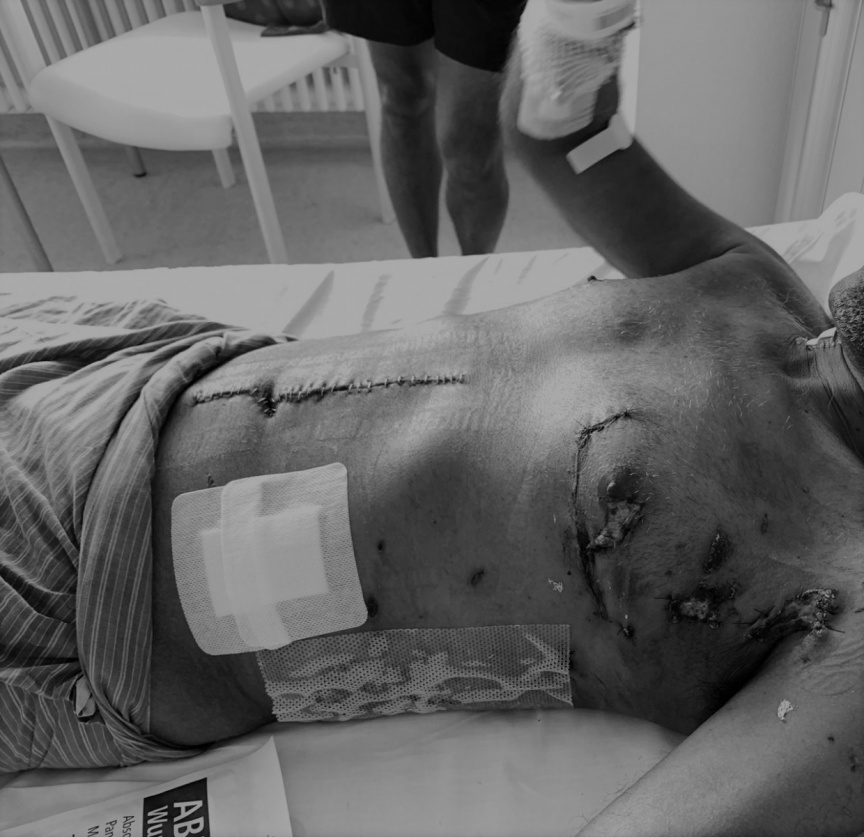
Image of injuries sustained by Nasheed following the assassination attempt

Nasheed underwent sixteen hours of surgery at ADK Hospital for injuries to head, chest, abdomen and limbs. Multiple pieces of shrapnel were removed during surgery, including one lodged a centimetre away from his heart. Agence France-Presse also reported that the bomb was filled with ball bearings to increase the damage caused. By Saturday, 8 May, Nasheed's condition had improved so that he could be taken off life support, although he remained in intensive care. On 13 May, Nasheed was flown to Germany to receive further treatment for his injuries to his head, chest, and abdomen. Nasheed underwent an additional surgery on his leg in a German military hospital and additional treatment and rehabilitation. Local outlets also reported he was required to attend follow-up reviews twice a week. Nasheed would later return to the Maldives on 11 October.

On 9 May, the Maldivian police announced that they had arrested the "prime suspect" (identified from video footage) and two accomplices, and were still searching for others. The police attributed the attack to "religious extremists". The arrested suspects denied being involved; all three of them had prior criminal records. The Criminal Court sentenced Ahmed Adhuham to 23 years for terorrism and supporting a terrorist group, and sentenced Abdulla Ali Manik to five years for supporting a terorrist group. As of 2025, Nasheed's bombing trials had been stalled.

=== MDP and The Democrats ===
In June 2022, Nasheed announced that he would be running for the MDP's 2023 party ticket, contesting incumbent President Solih. Nasheed accused him of enacting policies that contradicted the founding principles and ideology of the party, accusing him of failing to address religious extremism in the country. Nasheed also alleged that Solih removed more than 39,000 members who were less likely to vote for him from the party's membership register, to potentially twist the election in his favor. He lost to President Solih, who won with 61.10% of the vote.

On 21 June 2023, Nasheed resigned from the MDP, saying that he did not think it was the best course of action to remain in the party. He later joined The Democrats—a party which Nasheed's supporters created amidst the deteroriation of relations within him and MDP—on 13 July 2023. During this time, he vowed to "dismantle MDP" in his debut speech after signing with the party; he had participated in campaign rallies for the party, and said he would bring a " revolutionary change". In December 2023, Nasheed announced a hiatus from political works and took up the role as the Secretary General for the Climate Vulnerable Forum.

=== Chairperson of MDP ===
In June 2025, a resolution was submitted at Nasheed's request to The Democrats' National Assembly to rejoin the MDP, The resolution was later passed and Nasheed officially rejoined the MDP a few days later. In April 2026, Nasheed returned to active politics in the country and announced his intention to run in the MDP chairperson election. He won the election with 21,063 votes out of 30,753 voters.

On 7 May 2026, Nasheed was announced as an advisor to Commonwealth Union Blockchain Network, a United Kingdom-registered organisation headed by Sheikh Saoud bin Faisal Al Qassimi. On 8 May, X user Jubraan Shareef published an on-chain analysis finding that approximately 73.13% of the organisation's $CWU token supply was held across 195 wallets exhibiting characteristics consistent with control by a single entity. On 10 May, Nasheed publicly defended the token on X, stating it was not a scam, despite the published on-chain evidence.

On 27 September 2026, Nasheed announced that he would be publishing a book compiling of short stories he wrote during the 1990s. He planned to generate more income from the sales of the book as a portion of the president's pension has been cut and the chairperson role does not have a salary. Additionally, he is building a house in Laamu Atoll. The book was published on 1 November 2026.

== Awards and recognitions ==
In May 2009, Nasheed received the Coral Cultivation Initiative Award which was presented by Huvafen Fushi. Nasheed was given the award as part of his awareness of the impact of climate change in the nation.

One month later, the Anna Lindh Memorial Fund awarded Nasheed the 2009 Anna Lindh Award for the role he played in bringing democracy to the Maldives and in recognition of his efforts "to put people and their human rights at the heart of the debate on climate change".

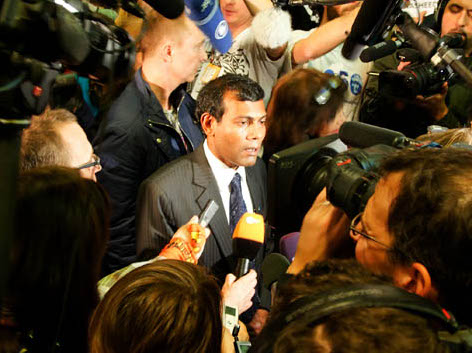
Nasheed during the Copenhagen Climate Change Conference

In September 2009, at the global premiere of the film The Age of Stupid, Nasheed was presented with a "Not Stupid" Award for his efforts to tackle climate change and for the Maldives' announcement to become the first carbon-neutral country in the world. In the same month, Time magazine named Nasheed to its "Leaders & Visionaries" category within its annual list of "Heroes of the Environment".

On Earth Day 2010, Nasheed was awarded the United Nations' Champions of the Earth Award. He received it at a gala event in Seoul, Republic of Korea, in conjunction with the B4E Business for the Environment Global Summit. According to a statement by Achim Steiner, the UN Environment Programme Executive Director, the award was in recognition of Nasheed being a loud voice for the poor suffering from the challenges of global warming and a politician showcasing how to transition to climate neutrality and how everyone can contribute. That year, he was also named by Foreign Policy magazine in its list of top global thinkers.

In March 2011, following his official visit to Mauritius, he was decorated by President Anerood Jugnauth and was awarded the highest distinct order of merit in the country, the Grand Commander of the Star and Key of the Indian Ocean during the official lunch hosted by Jugnauth at the Château of Réduit.

On 28 June 2012, Nasheed received the James Lawson Award from the International Center on Nonviolent Conflict at Tufts University in Massachusetts, US. The award was given to recognize his leadership in opposing the long regime and to recognize his opposition to the armed coup along with his nonviolent action on restoring democracy.

In November 2024, Nasheed was honoured with the Global Citizen Award, jointly presented by Henley & Partners and the Andan Foundation, in recognition of his climate advocacy and human rights activism.

== See also ==
- Mohamed Muizzu
- Maldivian Democratic Party
- Abdulla Yameen

== Bibliography ==
- Nasheed, Mohamed (2019). "Chapter 3: We are not prepared to die". In Extinction Rebellion (ed.). This Is Not a Drill: An Extinction Rebellion Handbook. Penguin Books. pp. 31–34. ISBN 9780141991443.
- Nasheed, Mohamed (2026). ކުރުވާހަކަ - 80 ގެ ކުރީކޮޅު [Short Stories - The Early 80s] (in Divehi). Ocean Publishing.

Political offices
Preceded by Maumoon Abdul Gayoom	President of the Maldives; 2008–2012	Succeeded by Mohamed Waheed Hassan
Diplomatic posts
Preceded by Jigme Thinley	Chairperson of SAARC; 2011	Succeeded by Sushil Koirala
