= Sustainable business =

Minimal negative or positive effect on the environment

Sustainable business refers to business practices that aim to engage in business activities while minimizing negative impacts on the global or local environment, community, and society. Businesses that undertake these practices aim to achieve the triple bottom line: profit, people, and the planet, by integrating environmental, economic, and social considerations when making business decisions. Sustainable businesses often adopt practices that promote environmental protection, and long-term economic growth.

A green business is characterized by several key pillars: First, the business incorporates environmentally friendly products or services that reduce the demand for harmful products and services, and may contribute to conserving natural resources. Second, the business preserves financial capital through responsible and efficient business models. Third, the company focuses on social responsibility by upholding human rights. Finally, it emphasizes cultural sustainability by supporting inclusion and respect for local and global communities.

Sustainable business encompasses a wide variety of practices and strategies implemented across diverse sectors and industries. These approaches may focus on reducing the environmental impact of the company and improving how efficiently the company utilizes its resources. While many of these practices are associated with long-term benefits, adopting them may present challenges and trade-offs.

== Context ==
The concept of sustainable business developed within discussions of sustainable development in the late 20th century. In 1987, the World Commission on Environment and Development published Our Common Future, a report focused primarily on public policy and international development. Ultimately, this publication influenced private-sector perspectives and approaches to environmental management and long-term use of resources.

== Terminology ==
The concept of sustainability refers to the ability to meet the needs without compromising the ability of future generations to meet their own. In business, sustainability includes aligning economic growth with environmental protection. It emphasizes practices that minimize ecological damage, such as the reduction of waste and the limitation of greenhouse gas emissions that contribute to rising atmospheric CO2 levels.

The term sustainable business is related to other concepts such as corporate social responsibility (CSR), corporate citizenship, and responsible business. The triple bottom line, introduced by John Elkington in the 1990s, expands all this idea by evaluating business success across people, planet, and profit dimensions.

In contrast, short-termism refers to the prioritizing short-term financial outcome at the expense of long-term interests. Short-termism discourages investment in sustainable initiatives, contributing to source depletion and increased CO2 emissions. Short-termism has become a relevant theme in sustainability discussions, as balancing financial outcomes with environmental and social considerations is a challenge within modern business practices.

Green businesses are sometimes considered as possible mediators of economic-environmental relations, even if the business has a minimal effect on lowering atmospheric CO_{2} levels. The definition of "green jobs" is ambiguous. Still, it is generally agreed that these jobs, the result of green business, should be linked to sustainable energy and contribute to reducing greenhouse gases. These corporations can be seen as generators of not only "green energy" but as producers of new "materializes" that are the product of the technologies these firms developed and deployed.

== Environmental dimension ==
A major initiative of sustainable businesses is to eliminate or decrease the environmental impact caused by the production and consumption of their goods. The impact of such human activities in terms of the number of greenhouse gases produced can be measured in units of carbon dioxide and is referred to as the carbon footprint. The carbon footprint concept is derived from the ecological footprint analysis, which examines the ecological capacity required to support the consumption of products.

Businesses can adopt a wide range of green initiatives: Tao et al. refer to a variety of "green" business practices including green strategy, green design, green production and green operation. One of the most common examples of a "green" business practice is the act of "going paperless" or sending electronic correspondence in instead of paper when possible. On a higher level, examples of sustainable business practices include: refurbishing used products (e.g., tuning up lightly used commercial fitness equipment for resale); revising production processes to eliminate waste (such as using a more accurate template to cut out designs), and choosing nontoxic raw materials and processes. For example, Canadian farmers have found that hemp is a sustainable alternative to rapeseed in their traditional crop rotation; hemp grown for fiber or seed requires no pesticides or herbicides. Another example is upcycling clothes or textiles, in which businesses can upcycle products to maintain or increase their quality.

Sustainable businesses aim to reduce environmental harm caused by production and consumption. This includes measuring carbon footprints, minimizing greenhouse gas emissions, and adopting practices such as: Refurbishing or upcycling products, Revising production processes to reduce waste, Using nontoxic materials, implementing design for the environment principles.

Examples include using hemp as a crop alternative, adopting paperless practices, and designing products for longer lifespans.

Sustainable business leaders also take into account the life cycle costs for the items they produce. Input costs must be considered regarding regulations, energy use, storage, and disposal. Designing for the environment (DFE) is also an element of sustainable business. This process enables users to consider the potential environmental impacts of a product and the process used to make that product.

The many possibilities for adopting green practices have led to considerable pressure being put upon companies from consumers, employees, government regulators, and other stakeholders. Companies may resort to greenwashing in order to create a more environmentally-friendly image by presenting products or practices as sustainable or environmentally beneficial without implementing corresponding operational changes. For example, various producers in the bamboo fiber industry have been taken to court for advertising their products as "greener" than they are. In their book Corporate Sustainability in International Comparison, Schaltegger et al. (2014) analyze the current state of corporate sustainability management and corporate social responsibility across eleven countries. Their research is based on an extensive survey focusing on the companies’ intention to pursue sustainability management (i.e. motivation; issues), the integration of sustainability in the organization (i.e. connecting sustainability to the core business; involving corporate functions; using drivers of business cases for sustainability) and the actual implementation of sustainability management measures (i.e. stakeholder management; sustainability management tools and standards; measurements). An effective way for businesses to contribute towards waste reduction is to remanufacture products so that the materials used can have a longer lifespan.

=== Examples of sustainable companies ===
The Harvard Business School business historian Geoffrey Jones traces the historical origins of green business back to pioneering start-ups in organic food and wind and solar energy before World War 1. Among large corporations, Ford Motor Company occupies an odd role in the story of sustainability. Ironically, founder Henry Ford was a pioneer in the sustainable business realm, experimenting with plant-based fuels during the days of the Model T. Ford Motor Company also shipped the Model A truck in crates that then became the vehicle floorboards at the factory destination. This was a form of upcycling, retaining high quality in a closed-loop industrial cycle. Furthermore, the original auto body was made of a stronger-than-steel hemp composite. Today, of course, Fords aren't made of hemp, nor do they run on the most sensible fuel. Currently, Ford's claim to eco-friendly fame is the use of seat fabric made from 100% post-industrial materials and renewable soy foam seat bases. Ford executives recently appointed the company’s first senior vice president of sustainability, environment, and safety engineering. This position is responsible for establishing a long-range sustainability strategy and environmental policy, developing the products and processes necessary to satisfy customers and society as a whole while working toward energy independence. It remains to be seen whether Ford will return to its founder's vision of a petroleum-free automobile, a vehicle powered by the remains of plant matter.

The automobile manufacturer Subaru has also made efforts to tackle sustainability. In 2008 a Subaru assembly plant in Lafayette became the first auto manufacturer to achieve zero landfill status when the plant implemented sustainable policies. The company successfully managed to implement a plan that increased refuse recycling to 99.8%. In 2012, the corporation increased the reuse of Styrofoam by 9%. And from the year 2008 to the year 2012, environmental incidents and accidents were reduced from 18 to 4.

Smaller companies such as Nature's Path, an organic cereal and snack-making business, have also made sustainability gains in the 21st century. CEO Arran Stephens and his associates have ensured that the quickly growing company's products are produced without toxic farm chemicals. Furthermore, employees are encouraged to find ways to reduce consumption. Sustainability is an essential part of corporate discussions. Another example comes from Salt Spring Coffee, a company created in 1996 as a certified organic, fair trade, coffee producer. In recent years they have become carbon neutral, lowering emissions by reducing long-range trucking and using bio-diesel in delivery trucks, upgrading to energy-efficient equipment, and purchasing carbon offsets. The company claims to offer the first carbon-neutral coffee sold in Canada. Salt Spring Coffee was recognized by the David Suzuki Foundation in the 2010 report Doing Business in a New Climate. A third example comes from Korea, where rice husks are used as nontoxic packaging for stereo components and other electronics. The same material is later recycled to make bricks.

Some companies in the textile industry have been moving towards more sustainable business practices. Specifically, the clothing company Patagonia has focused on reducing consumption and waste. The company limits its environmental impact by ensuring only recycled and organic materials, repairing damaged clothes, and by complying with strong environmental protection standards for its entire supply chain.

Some companies in the mining and specifically gold mining industries are attempting to move towards more sustainable practices, especially given that the industry is one of the most environmentally destructive. Regarding gold mining, Northwestern University scientists have, in the laboratory, discovered an inexpensive and environmentally sustainable method that uses simple cornstarch—instead of cyanide—to isolate gold from raw materials in a selective manner. Such a method can reduce the amount of cyanide released into the environment during gold extraction from raw ore, with one of the Northwestern University scientists, Sir Fraser Stoddart stating that: “The elimination of cyanide from the gold industry is of the utmost importance environmentally".

Additionally, the retail jewelry industry is now trying to be more sustainable, with companies using green energy providers and recycling more, as well as preventing the use of mined-so called 'virgin gold' by applying re-finishing methods on pieces and re-selling them. Furthermore, the customer may opt for Fairtrade Gold, which gives a better deal to small-scale and artisanal miners, and is an element of sustainable business. However, not everyone thinks that mining can be sustainable and many believe that much more must be done, noting that mining in general requires greater regional and international legislation and regulation, which is a valid point given the huge impact mining has on the planet and the huge number of products and goods that are made wholly or partly from mined materials.

In the luxury sector, in 2012, the group Kering developed the "Environmental Profit & Loss account" (EP&L) accounting method to track the progress of its sustainability goals, a strategy aligned with the UN Sustainable Development Goals. In 2019, on a request from the President Emmanuel Macron, François-Henri Pinault, Chairman and CEO of the luxury group Kering, presented the Fashion Pact during the summit, an initiative signed by 32 fashion firms committing to concrete measures to reduce their environmental impact. By 2020, 60 firms joined the Fashion Pact.

Fair Trade is a form of sustainable business and among the highest forms of CSR (Corporate Social Responsibility). Organizations that participate in Fair Trade typically adhere to the ten principles of the World Fair Trade Organization (WFTO). Moreover, Fair Trade promotes entrepreneurial development among communities in developing countries and it encourages communities to be responsible and accountable for their economic development via market engagement. Fair Trade is a form of marketing with a strong and direct social benefit beyond the economic supply chain.

In Sub-Saharan Africa, Ghanaian micro, small, and medium enterprises (MSMEs) have also engaged in environmentally sustainable business practices despite limited resources. According to a 2023 study, MSMEs across sectors such as plastic recycling, oil marketing, financial services, and consumer goods have adopted strategies that align with environmental stewardship, process efficiency, and sustainability-oriented culture. These include utilizing electronic documentation to minimize paper waste, incorporating renewable energy sources, implementing effective waste disposal systems, and educating staff on sustainability awareness. The study highlights that drivers such as sustainability-focused leadership, eco-preneurship, and resource optimization contribute not only to environmental impact reduction but also to competitive advantage and business longevity in Ghana’s growing informal and formal MSME sectors.

Many studies highlight the long-term benefits of sustainable practices. For instance, a 2026 study of Indian firms, with additional robustness checks using Chinese and U.S. samples, found that continuous improvements in environmental performance were associated with higher financial performance, including sales, profitability, employee productivity, and market valuation (Tobin’s Q). Recent research however suggests that firms may also face short-term trade-offs. A 2023 study of European listed firms found that, contrary to the common assumption of a "win-win," stronger sustainability practices were associated with reduced profitability, indicating that sustainability initiatives can temporarily lower financial performance.

== Social dimension of sustainability ==
Sustainability in the social sphere refers to a business's responsibility to maintain the well-being of their employees, customers and community. Organizations may contribute to sustainability by supporting education, encouraging employee volunteering, and making charitable contributions. Organizations that give back to the community, whether through employees volunteering their time or through charitable donations, are often considered socially sustainable.

Socially sustainable practices can improve the quality of life in local communities and strengthen stakeholder relationship. Social sustainability is often linked to environmental justice, emphasizing that social equity and environmental responsibility are related and one affects the other. For a business to be sustainable, it must sustain not only the necessary environmental resources, but also social resources, including employees, customers, and its reputation.

Nonprofit organizations are recognizing the importance of environmental sustainability, not only in advocacy but in operational practices. Recent research suggests that adopting an environmental culture can mediate and strengthen the relationship between sustainability efforts and organizational performance outcomes in nonprofits. In a 2023 study, Ramdhony and Rajadurai found that nonprofits embedding environmental sustainability into their organizational values experienced improvements in stakeholder trust, funding outcomes, and long-term resilience. These findings highlight the evolving role of nonprofits not just as beneficiaries of sustainable development goals, but as implementers of green operational practices in the broader ecosystem of sustainable business.

== Consumer-producer dynamics ==
Modern sustainability includes social and environmental factors often overlooked in the traditional business models. More consumers are demanding more sustainable goods and services, particularly when they perceive companies neglect their environmental responsibilities. Ecological awareness, sometimes viewed as a personal preference instead of a necessity, is a strategic marketing tool for firms that want to enhance their brand image. However, it is essential that companies re-state their environmental claims, greenwashing leads to consumer distrust and long-term reputational damage.

=== Greenwashing ===
As sustainability has become a significant consideration in the last decade, companies face a greater perusal regarding the credibility of their environmental claims. In the United States, the Federal Trade Commission (FTC) Green guides enforces Green Guides, helping businesses avoid misleading advertising through deceptive environmental statements. Greenwashing refers to the act of presenting false, vague, or exaggerated benefits a company products, policies, or services offer. Greenwashing includes exaggerated claims about sustainability, stating the use of eco-friendly materials, or promoting harmful practices as "green".

When companies do not follow such guides, they may be subject to legal consequences and harmed reputations. Sustainable businesses often invest in experienced legal practitioners who can understand and can provide counsel on the FTC Guides and other such frameworks.

A related example is the 2015 Volkswagen emissions case, in which the company marketed diesel vehicles as environmentally friendly while using software that manipulated emissions test results. Subsequent investigations revealed the vehicles were equipped with "defeat" devices to cheat emission test, producing nitrogen oxide far above legal limits. Specifically, the vehicles emitted nitrogen oxides at levels up to 40 times higher than those approved by the Environmental Protection Agency (EPA) during normal driving conditions.

This incident led to significant fines, charges, and loss of consumer trust. The company agreed to spend approximately $14.7 billion to resolve civil claims in the U.S., which included funds for buybacks, lease terminations, consumer compensation, emission reduction programs, and investment in further norm-compliant vehicle technology.

The following case study illustrates how consumer awareness and behavior influence the sustainability practices adopted by producers, particularly in the fashion industry

=== Case study: consumer attitudes toward sustainable fashion ===
A qualitative study conducted in Lisbon, Portugal, by Leandro Pereira, Rita Carvalho, Alvaro Dias, Renato Costa, and Nelson Antonio examined how sustainability affects consumer choices in the fashion industry. Based on fifty interviews, researchers identified two groups: those who actively practice sustainable habits (60%), and those who are aware of sustainability, but not yet taken concrete action (40%). Active consumers practice recycling, purchasing second-hand garments, and supporting sustainable fashion brands. Less engaged consumers cited barriers including price, limited access, and lack of education. The study concluded that although awareness of sustainability is increasing, widespread change requires more affordable and convenient ecological options, as well as improved consumer education.

== Organizations ==
The European community’s Restriction of Hazardous Substances Directive restricts the use of certain hazardous materials in the production of various electronic and electrical products. Waste Electrical and Electronic Equipment (WEEE) directives provide collection, recycling, and recovery practices for electrical goods. The World Business Council for Sustainable Development and the World Resources Institute are two organizations working together to set a standard for reporting on corporate carbon footprints. From October 2013, all quoted companies in the UK are legally required to report their annual greenhouse gas emissions in their directors’ report, under the Companies Act 2006 (Strategic and Directors’ Reports) Regulations 2013.

Lester Brown’s Plan B 2.0 and Hunter Lovins’s Natural Capitalism provide information on sustainability initiatives.

== Corporate sustainability strategies ==
Corporate sustainability strategies can aim to take advantage of sustainable revenue opportunities, while protecting the value of business against increasing energy costs, the costs of meeting regulatory requirements, changes in the way customers perceive brands and products, the volatile price of resources.

Not all eco-strategies can be incorporated into a company's business immediately. The widely practiced strategies include Innovation, Collaboration, Process Improvement and Sustainability reporting. Some eco-strategies include:

1. Innovation & Technology: This method focuses on a company's ability to change its products and services towards better environmental impacts, for example less waste production.
2. Collaboration: The formation of networks with similar or partner companies facilitates knowledge sharing and propels innovation.
3. Process Improvement: Continuous process surveying and improvement are essential to reduction in negative impacts. Employee awareness of company-wide sustainability plan further aids the integration of new and improved processes.
4. Sustainability Reporting: Periodic reporting of company performance in relation to goals encourages performance monitoring internally and transparency and accountability externally. The goals might then be incorporated into the corporate mission.
5. Greening the Supply Chain: Sustainable procurement is important for any sustainability strategy as a company's impact on the environment is much bigger than the products that they consume. The B Corporation (certification) model is a good example of one that encourages companies to focus on this.
6. Choosing the Right Leaders: Having CEOs informed about the opportunities from sustainability guides companies in the right steps to being eco-friendly. As the world is slowly transitioning to sustainability, it is important for our company leaders to prioritize and have a sense of urgency.

Companies should adopt a sound measurement and management system to collect data on their sustainability impacts and dependencies, as well as a regular forum for all stakeholders to discuss sustainability issues. The Sustainability Balanced Scorecard is a performance measurement and management system aiming at balancing financial and non-financial as well as short and long-term measures. It explicitly integrates strategically relevant environmental, social and ethical goals into the overall performance management system and supports strategic sustainability management.

Noteworthy examples of sustainable business practices that are often part of corporate sustainability strategies can include: transitioning to renewable energy sources, implementing effective recycling programs, minimizing waste generation in industrial processes, developing eco-friendly product designs, prioritizing the adoption of sustainable packaging materials, fostering an ethical and responsible supply chain, partnering with charities, encouraging volunteerism, upholding equitable treatment of employees, and prioritizing their overall welfare, among numerous other initiatives.

=== Implementation in SMEs ===
Small and medium-sized enterprises face distinctive challenges when adopting corporate sustainability strategies. A 2023 Swiss survey of 514 SMEs reported that 89% had never produced a sustainability report, citing limited internal resources and unfamiliarity with international standards as main barriers. Nevertheless, SMEs that embraced systematic sustainability reporting recorded a 25% self-reported improvement in corporate reputation and an 18% improvement in workplace quality, indicating that even partial adoption can yield competitive advantages.

== Standards ==
Enormous economic and population growth worldwide in the second half of the twentieth century aggravated the factors that threaten health and the environment — including ozone depletion, climate change, resource depletion, fouling of natural resources, and extensive loss of biodiversity and habitat. In the past, the standard approaches to environmental problems generated by business and industry have been regulatory-driven "end-of-the-pipe" remediation efforts. In the 1990s, efforts by governments, NGOs, corporations, and investors began to grow to develop awareness and plans for voluntary standards and investment in sustainability by business.

One critical milestone was the establishment of the ISO 14000 standards whose development came as a result of the Rio Summit on the Environment held in 1992. ISO 14001 is the cornerstone standard of the ISO 14000 series. This specifies a framework of control for an Environmental Management System against which an organization can be certified by a third party. Other ISO 14000 Series Standards are actually guidelines, many to help you achieve registration to ISO 14001. They include the following:

- ISO 14004 provides guidance on the development and implementation of environmental management systems.
- ISO 14010 provides general principles of environmental auditing (now superseded by ISO 19011)
- ISO 14011 provides specific guidance on audit an environmental management system (now superseded by ISO 19011)
- ISO 14012 provides guidance on qualification criteria for environmental auditors and lead auditors (now superseded by ISO 19011)
- ISO 14013/5 provides audit program review and assessment material.
- ISO 14020+ labeling issues
- ISO 14030+ provides guidance on performance targets and monitoring within an Environmental Management System
- ISO 14040+ covers life cycle issues

There are now a wide range of sustainability accounting frameworks that organizations use to measure and disclose on their sustainability impacts and dependencies. These have evolved since the 1990s to encompass metrics spanning a wide range of social, environmental, economic and ethical issues.

== Circular business models ==
Early academic, industry, and policy discussions around circularity primarily focused on re-X strategies such as recycling, remanufacturing, reuse, and recovery. However, it became evident that technological capabilities advanced faster than the practical implementation. For a successful transition toward a circular economy, collaboration among stakeholders is required. The business model innovation is a key driver for integrating circular technologies into organizations.

Circular business models aim to reduce resource consumption, minimize waste, and regenerate natural systems by rethinking production and consumption dynamics. Corporations are increasingly implementing circular strategies to achieve both environmental and financial benefits. Circular business can be classified into four main strategies. First, by narrowing resource loops that involves increasing production efficiency, by using fewer materials, often as implementing initiatives that optimize manufacturing processes. For example, in the cosmetics industry, upcycling—the repurposing of byproduct waste materials or useless products—emerges as a powerful strategy to advance circularity, minimize waste, and conserve resources. Second, by slowing resource loops, extending the lifespan of products through repair, reuse, resale, or rental services. Closing resource loops, focusing on reusing or recycling materials to return them into new production cycles. Regenerating natural systems emphasizes restoring resources used for production, for example, through agricultural practices.

These strategies allow companies to reduce costs, create new value propositions, and improve sustainability, though there are still challenges such as technology, consumer adaptation to ecological practices, and profitability considerations.

== Writing and sustainable businesses ==
Writing about and communicating clean initiatives and ways to reduce emissions inspires other businesses and their possibilities of adopting these practices. Since businesses are able to reach groups of people, they have a significant role in the advancement of sustainable practices and environmental protection, by influencing both public policy, their customers, and other businesses. It has been suggested that businesses “take up the rhetorics and literacies necessary to communicate, analyze, organize, and mitigate environmental crises such as climate change”. This task is challenging due to climate change’s innate scientific complexity, abstract nature, and politically polarized character.

However, there are some ways to increase the effectiveness of this communication. By shedding light on local and more immediate issues, people can be more easily influenced to take action. Additionally, bringing attention to how it will impact humans, specifically human health, can help stress the urgency and severity of the situation. Lastly, suggesting action items and ways one can do their part can help make the climate crisis less daunting.

== Challenges and opportunities ==
Implementing sustainable business practices may have an effect on profits and a firm's financial 'bottom line'. However, during a time where environmental awareness is popular, green strategies are likely to be embraced by employees, consumers, and other stakeholders. Many organizations concerned about the environmental impact of their business are taking initiatives to invest in sustainable business practices. In fact, a positive correlation has been reported between environmental performance and economic performance. Businesses trying to implement sustainable business need to have insights on balancing the social equity, economic prosperity and environmental quality elements.

If an organization’s current business model is inherently unsustainable, becoming truly sustainable requires a complete makeover of the business model (e.g. from selling cars to offering car sharing and other mobility services). This can present a major challenge due to the differences between the old and the new model and the respective skills, resources and infrastructure needed. A new business model can offer major opportunities by entering or even creating new markets and reaching new customer groups. The main challenges faced in the sustainable business practices implementation by businesses in developing countries include lack of skilled personnel, technological challenges, socio-economic challenges, organizational challenges and lack of proper policy framework. Skilled personnel plays a crucial role in quality management, enhanced compliance with international quality standards, and preventative and operational maintenance attitude necessary to ensure sustainable business. In the absence of skilled work forces, companies fail to implement a sustainable business model.

Another major challenge to the effective implementation of sustainable business is organizational challenges. Organizational challenges to the implementation of sustainable business activities arise from the difficulties associated with the planning, implementation and evaluation of sustainable business models. Addressing the organizational challenges for the implementation of sustainable business practices need to begin by analyzing the whole value chain of the business rather than focusing solely on the company's internal operations. Another major challenge is the lack of an appropriate policy framework for sustainable business. Companies often comply with the lowest economic, social and environmental sustainability standards, when in fact the true sustainability can be achieved when the business is focused beyond compliance with integrated strategy and purpose.

Companies leading the way in sustainable business practices can take advantage of sustainable revenue opportunities: according to the Department for Business, Innovation and Skills the UK green economy will grow by 4.9 to 5.5 percent a year by 2015, and the average internal rate of return on energy efficiency investments for large businesses is 48%. A 2013 survey suggests that demand for green products appears to be increasing: 27% of respondents said they are more likely to buy a sustainable product and/or service than 5 years ago. Furthermore, sustainable business practices may attract talent and generate tax breaks.

Digitalization can also challenge and enhance the implementation of sustainable business models (SBMs). A systematic review by Broccardo et al. (2023) found that digital technologies, such as big data, blockchain, Internet of Things (IoT), and artificial intelligence (AI), can enable businesses to transform traditional business models toward sustainability. Some transforms include improving efficiency, promoting resource sharing, facilitating recycling and remanufacturing, and fostering stakeholder collaboration. These digital tools can create "virtuous circles," in which investments in digital transformation can generate operational savings and establish new revenue streams that further support sustainable initiatives. However, the study expresses that digitalization is not automatically beneficial; it requires strategic alignment with social, environmental, and economic goals to avoid unintended trade-offs, such as high energy consumption or unequal access to technology.

== Employee engagement and organizational culture in sustainability ==
Sustainable business practices are significantly influenced by the degree of employee engagement and the prevailing organizational culture. Organizations that cultivate a culture oriented toward sustainability frequently demonstrate elevated levels of employee involvement in environmentally focused initiatives, including efforts to reduce energy consumption and participation in community programs. Employee engagement mechanisms, such as the establishment of "green teams" or the implementation of internal sustainability competitions, serve to motivate staff to contribute innovative ideas and assume responsibility for advancing environmental and social objectives.

Empirical research indicates that organizations characterized by a culture emphasizing sustainability tend to report improved employee morale, reduced turnover rates, and increased levels of innovation. Employees are more inclined to propose environmentally sustainable solutions when their contributions are recognized and perceived as aligned with organizational objectives. Leadership is considered instrumental in this context, as leaders who model sustainable behaviors, articulate clear sustainability goals, and acknowledge or reward sustainability-related initiatives contribute to the advancement of environmental and social outcomes within the organization.

The integration of sustainability into organizational culture is associated with the potential to reduce an organization’s ecological footprint, strengthen internal cohesion, foster trust among stakeholders, and enhance its reputation as a socially responsible entity.

== See also ==
- B4E Business for the Environment – International conference for business and environment dialogue
- Green America – US non-profit organization
- B Corporation (certification) – Social and environmental certification of for-profit companies
- Bottom of the pyramid – Socio-economic group
- Carbon Trust – British non-profit climate change consultancy
- Clean Edge – Publisher of thematic stock indexes
- Clean Energy Trends – Energy development
- Clean Tech Nation – 2012 book by Ron Pernick and Clint Wilder
- Cleaner production – Preventive, company-specific environmental protection initiative
- Conscious business – Business concept
- Corporate sustainability – Business strategy that focuses on sustainability as a core aspect of the business
- Externality – Imposed cost or benefit in economics
- Gort cloud – 2009 book and green marketing concept
- Green brands – Potentially sustainable brands
- Green PR
- Sustainable MBA – Academic degree
- Low carbon economy – Climate-friendly economy
- The Natural Step – Foundation
- Net Impact
- Renewable energy commercialization – Deployment of technologies harnessing easily replenished natural resources
- Renewable energy industry – Electric energy utility industry
- Sustainable Business Network – Social enterprise in Auckland, New Zealand
- Sustainable finance – Finance with an environmental objective
- Worldchanging
