= Meekail Ahmed Naseem =

Maldivian politician

- މީކާއީލު އަޙްމަދު ނަސީމް

Member of the People's Majlis
- Incumbent
- Assumed office 28 May 2019
- President: Ibrahim Mohamed Solih; Mohamed Muizzu
- Preceded by: Ahmed Mahloof
- Constituency: South Galolhu

Personal details
- Party: Maldivian Democratic Party
- Education: Magdalene College (BA); University of Bath (MA)

Meekail Ahmed Naseem (Dhivehi: މީކާއީލު އަޙްމަދު ނަސީމް) is a Maldivian politician who served as the Member of the People's Majlis for the South Galolhu constituency since 2019. A member of the Maldivian Democratic Party, he served as the president of the party's youth wing. He is the youngest politician to serve as a member of parliament.

== Early life and education ==
Naseem attended Jamaluddin School and later Dharumavantha School. He received a scholarship from the Maldivian government which was revoked and fully scrapped following Naseem's speech in 2012, where he spoke about the controversial transfer of power. He was expelled from Villa International High School due to conflicting political beliefs with their headmaster. He later received the Cambridge-Commonwealth Scholarship in 2015 where he went to Magdalene College and obtained his bachelor's degree in politics, psychology, and sociology. He also received the Chevening Scholarship and attended the University of Bath where he received his master's degree in international relations.

== Career ==
Naseem was elected as the President of the Maldivian Democratic Party's youth wing in 2017. Naseem spontaneously ran in the 2019 parliamentary election for South Galolhu. He's commented on his difficulties to gather votes as there was stigma around his young age and that he was not "Galolhu enough" to run. He later won with 1115 votes. During his time as an MP in the 19th People's Majlis, he amended the Sexual Offences Act to reduce evidence needed against victimes to reduce chances of rapists avoiding conviction, amended the Maldivian Land Act to award land plots to recipients from the state with a duration of six months, filed an emergency motion regarding the Maldives Correctional Services' decision to allow former vice president Ahmed Adeeb to travel abroad. Naseem was also the Vice Chairperson for the Committee on Independent Institutions, member of the Committee of the Whole House, and the Government Oversight Committee.

In 2024, Naseem ran in that year's parliamentary election for South Galolhu and won with 1092 votes. During his tenure as the South Galolhu MP in the 20th People's Majlis, Naseem submitted a bill banning Israeli passport holders to entering the Maldives due to the genocidal war in Gaza, he submitted a bill to repeal the Freedom of Peaceful Assembly Act as it undermines rights by placing restrictions on gatherings, a resolution submitted against Public Service Media accusing them of discriminating against political parties.

In 2026, he ran for the election of chairperson of the Maldivian Democraitc Party. He lost to Mohamed Nasheed and congratulated him on a phone call.

== Controversies ==
Naseem was kicked out of the parliament building in separate occasions. In February 2025, he was kicked out after protesting not to hold parliamentary elections and presidential elections on the same day. In August, Naseem was kicked out after he accused Foreign minister Abdulla Khaleel of dodging questions, later Majlis speaker Abdul Raheem Abdulla named him and he was forced to leave. In September, MDP MPs staged protests on the Majlis floor during the reading of the Maldives Media and Broadcasting Regulation Bill, many were kicked out including Naseem.

In 2025, Naseem landed in a controversy after a post honouring him by Jamaluddin School was deleted, reportedly on the orders of the Ministry of Education. The school denied the claim and said that the deletion due to Naseem's unacceptable behaviour.

In 2026, Naseem was ejected from the Majlis after he accused housing minister Abdulla Muththalib of bribing ruling party lawmakers to pass the real estate bill proposed by the government. Speaker Abdul Raheem Abdulla warned him not to make unfounded claims and many MDP MPs protested against Abdulla after majority leader Ibrahim Falah made comments against Naseem. Naseem was carried out of the Majlis chamber by security personnel.
