= Bruce Robertson =

Bruce Robertson may refer to:

- Bruce Robertson (judge) (born 1944), New Zealand judge
- Bruce Robertson (swimmer) (born 1953), Canadian Olympic Games swimmer
- Bruce Robertson (rugby union) (1952–2023), New Zealand rugby union player
- Bruce Robertson (rower) (born 1962), Canadian rower
- Bruce Robertson, anti-hero of the novel Filth by Irvine Welsh
- Bruce Robertson, creator of the Bookseller/Diagram Prize for Oddest Title of the Year
