= 2026 Maldivian Democratic Party chair election =

- 12 June 2026
Candidate	Mohamed Nasheed	Meekail Ahmed Naseem	Ibrahim Mohamed
Party	MDP	MDP	MDP
Popular vote	21,063	9,251	169
Percentage	68.98%	30.47%	0.56%
Chair before election
Fayyaz Ismail
Elected Chair
Mohamed Nasheed

The 2026 Maldivian Democratic Party chair election was an election held on 12 June 2026 to elect the chairperson of the Maldivian Democratic Party (MDP). The election triggered after the chairperson Fayyaz Ismail resigned to take part in the 2028 presidential election.

During a session of the party's National Council, Abdul Ghafoor Moosa was elected as the interim chairperson, receiving 65 out of 66 votes.

On 22 April 2026, the party had opened applications and voting is scheduled to be held on 12 June.

On 1 May, the interim chairperson Abdul Ghafoor Moosa proposed delaying the chairperson election until after the presidential primaries, citing the party's lack of funds to conduct elections and may create discord within the party. Meekail Ahmed Naseem opposed the proposed postponent, saying that it must proceed with the timeline announced by the party.

== Candidates ==
- Mohamed Nasheed, previously chairperson from 2005 to 2008 and party president from 2014 to 2023
- Meekail Ahmed Naseem, MP for North Galolhu
- Alhan Fahmy, former MP (dropped)
- Ibrahim Mohamed

== Endorsements ==
=== Meekail Ahmed Naseem ===
- Ibrahim Mohamed Solih, former President of the Maldives (2018–2023)
- Faisal Naseem, former Vice President of the Maldives (2018–2023)
- Abdulla Shahid, President of the Maldivian Democratic Party (2024–present)
- Maldivian Democratic Party's parliamentary group

=== Mohamed Nasheed ===
- Fayyaz Ismail, former chairperson of MDP

== Results ==
Nasheed won by a landslide with 69% of the votes, with the MDP confirming that Nasheed won the election. Naseem congratulated Nasheed on a phone call.
