= Mariya Ahmed Didi =

Maldivian politician (born 1962)

- މާރިޔާ އަހުމަދު ދީދީ
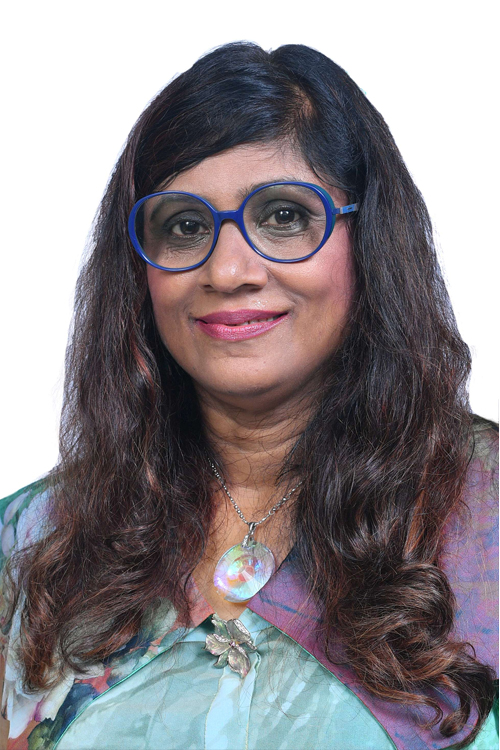
- Official portrait, 2018

Minister of Defence
- In office 17 November 2018 – 17 November 2023
- President: Ibrahim Mohamed Solih
- Preceded by: Adam Shareef
- Succeeded by: Mohamed Ghassan Maumoon

Member of the People's Majlis
- In office 28 May 2009 – 17 November 2018
- President: Abdulla Yameen
- Preceded by: Constituency created
- Succeeded by: Mohamed Rasheed
- Constituency: North Mahchangoalhi
- In office 2005 – 28 May 2009
- President: Maumoon Abdul Gayoom
- Constituency: Kaafu Atoll

Personal details
- Born: Machchangolhi, Malé, Maldives
- Party: Maldivian Democratic Party
- Spouse: Mohamed Amir (m. 1996)
- Children: 3
- Education: Aberystwyth University (LLB) (Hons)

Mariya Ahmed Didi (Dhivehi: މާރިޔާ އަހުމަދު ދީދީ) is a Maldivian barrister and politician who served as the Minister of Defence of the Maldives. After being the campaign manager for president Ibrahim Mohamed Solih during the 2018 elections, she was appointed the nation's first-ever female Minister of Defence.

Didi, in her capacity as Minister of Defence, oversaw a total of 8 critical institutions, namely Maldives National Defence Force (MNDF), National Counter Terrorism Centre (NCTC), National Disaster Management Authority (NDMA), Maldives Customs Service, Maldives Immigration, Aviation Security Command (AVSECOM), Anti-Trafficking in Persons (Anti-TIP), and Maldives Hydrographic Service.

Didi instituted the tradition of engaging regularly with the MNDF leadership and defence sector agencies through weekly plenary meetings and multi-agency sit-downs, where the latest information and updates are exchanged in cross-sector settings.

== Early life and education ==
Didi was the third oldest sibling and had eleven siblings. She studied in Aminiya School before getting in trouble with the authorities which stopped her from studying in the Maldives. She later continued her studies in Bangalore, India in 1976. During her time, she represented the school in various events and was the captain of the basketball team.

She got married in 1981 and had her first child Affaan who was born on 29 November 1981.

In 1984, Didi won the National Badminton Championship.

She started to work in the Ministry of Trade and Industries before later quiting in 1988.

Didi completed her bachelor's degree in law (LLB) (Hons) and a master's degree in law (LLB) (Hons) from Aberystwyth University. She completed her professional qualifications in England and is among the first two Barristers to be called to the Bar of England and Wales, and is a Barrister of Gray's Inn, England, having done her pupillage at Albion Chambers, Bristol.

She later returned to the Maldives and was the first woman to be qualified as a lawyer in the country. In 1998, despite her reluctance, she joined the Attorney General's Office after being convinced to join by then Attorney General Mohamed Munavvar to help make a legal system in the country.

In 1996, Didi got married again to Mohamed Amir and on 5 May 1999, she gave birth to her second son Athfaan.

In 2005, Didi joined the Maldivian Democratic Party (MDP).

In 2007, she was awarded the International Women of Courage Award by the US Secretary of State for her work promoting women's rights. Didi gave birth to her daughter.

== Career ==
Didi was elected as Chairperson of the Maldivian Democratic Party (MDP) and began her tenure on 13 March 2008. Under her chairwomanship, the party won their first multiparty democratic presidential elections held in the Maldives in 2008. The electoral win marked an end to the preceding 30-year-old authoritarian regime and established democracy in the Maldives. She later resigned in June 2011 to stand as a candidate in for the Judicial Service Commission as the member representing the People's Majlis.

On 7 February 2012, then-President Mohamed Nasheed resigned in a self proclaimed "coup d'état". Supporters of MDP were protesting against his resignation including Didi were beaten by police offifcers. The Police Integrity Commission concluded that excessive force was used against Didi but the case was dropped due to lack of evidence to identify the perpretrator.

Didi was appointed to the People's Majlis as the President's Member to the Majlis in 2000. Didi ran in the 2005 parliamentary election for the Kaafu Atoll constituency, which she later won and was elected. She later ran as a member of the Maldivian Democratic Party in the 2009 parliamentary election for the North Machchangolhi constituency which she served until her resignation in 2018 to become the Minister of Defence.

In the 2018 presidential elections, Didi was appointed as the spokesperson for Ibrahim Mohamed Solih's campaign. Solih later won the election against incumbent President Abdulla Yameen. Solih later appointed Didi as the nation's first female defence minister.

=== Minister of Defence (2018–2023) ===
In the first year of her tenure, Didi led an initiative to free the MNDF of any political influence in the country in an effort to raise public trust in the institution. In this regard, some landmark steps include guiding the formulation of MNDF's Capstone Doctrine, designing multiple programmes and endeavours geared towards building MNDF's professionalism, operational capacity and interoperability, and setting up MNDF's first-ever military justice system. Additionally, empowering MNDF's grievance mechanism, launching multiple soldier welfare initiatives, and encouraging forums for democratic debate and dialogue in the armed forces.

Didi is recognized for her role in working closely with the National Security Advisors of fellow member states India and Sri Lanka, to set a Charter for the Colombo Security Conclave, which began as a trilateral security framework with 4 pillars for security cooperation among the 3 countries.

In November 2021, Didi became the first Minister from outside India to officiate the Passing Out Parade (POP) - Autumn Term at the Indian Naval Academy (INA) in Ezhimala - Asia's largest naval academy.

==== Women in the military ====
A recipient of the US State Department's International Women of Courage Award for her commitment to democracy and human rights, Didi is widely celebrated for her work to ensure gender equality in the armed forces. Didi initiated the restructuring of the council to allow membership of Lieutenant Colonels and thereafter appointed 2 female Lieutenant Colonels to the council for the first time. These steps were taken as part of a mission to ensure female representation at the highest level of MNDF's decision-making, following the promotion of 3 female officers to the rank of Lieutenant Colonel.

In August 2021, MNDF appointed its first-ever Female Information Officer. In early 2021, Lieutenant Firushana Thaufeeg, the first-ever female Maldivian officer cadet to have been sent to the prestigious Royal Military Academy Sandhurst in the UK returned, having attained the Best International Student Award from the Short Commissioning Course.

==== Efforts against terrorism and violent extremism ====
Didi was part of the Solih administration's efforts to counter Terrorism and Violent Extremism in the country, through the enforcement of its Zero Tolerance Policy on Terrorism and Violent Extremism. These steps include the formulation of the National Action Plan on Preventing and Countering Violent Extremism. Under Didi's leadership, the National Counter Terrorism Centre played an instrumental role as the Maldives’ national lead agency for coordinating efforts to prevent Terrorism and Violent Extremism through a 'whole-of government' and a 'whole-of-society' approach. The past 3 years, in particular, has seen the centre's national footprint expand and evolve, as evidenced by the many seminars, workshops and mobile intervention programs, in collaboration with local and international partners.

==== Covid-19 pandemic ====
Didi became a leading face of the Maldivian government's COVID-19 containment effort in early 2020. From March 2020 when the State of Public Health Emergency was first declared, Didi chaired hundreds of critical “Emergency Cell” meetings at NEOC and oversaw the setting up of many facilities nationwide to deal with the pandemic.

Despite constraints posed by COVID-19, at least 60 percent of MNDF soldiers were trained, both locally and internationally.

== See also ==
- List of first women lawyers and judges in Asia
