= Commission of National Inquiry =

Maldivian commission (2012)

- Founded: 24 February 2012; 14 years ago
- Founder: Mohamed Waheed Hassan
- Defunct: 30 August 2012
- Headquarters: Muliaage, Malé, Maldives
- Key people: G. P. Selvam – Co-chair; Ismail Shafeeu – Co-chair
- Members: Ibrahim Yasir – Member; Ali Fawaz Shareef – Member; Ahmed Saeed – President Nasheed's member; Sir Bruce Robertson – Legal Adviser; Professor John Packer – Legal Adviser
- Website: www.conireport.org

The Commission of National Inquiry was an independent body established by President Mohamed Waheed Hassan on 21 February 2012 to investigate the events that occurred in the Maldives from 14 January–8 February 2012. This also included the controversial resignation of Mohamed Nasheed which he claims was a coup.

== Members ==
There are five members of the commission as well as two legal advisers nominated by the United Nations Department of Political Affairs and the Commonwealth. Although the Supreme Court of the Maldives formally objected the composition of members claiming a threat to national sovereignty, President Waheed insisted that it was necessary.

- G. P. Selvam – Co-chair
- Ismail Shafeeu – Co-chair
- Ibrahim Yasir – Member
- Ali Fawaz Shareef – Member
- Ahmed Saeed – President Nasheed's member
- Sir Bruce Robertson – Legal Adviser
- Professor John Packer – Legal Adviser

=== Nasheed's members ===
Members appointed by Mohamed Nasheed were given a criterion to meet:

- be a person of integrity with high ethical, moral and professional standards with at least an undergraduate degree from a recognized university
- not have been politically active during the past two years
- not have held a Cabinet post or served as a member of the People's Majlis during the past two years
- not have taken a public stand on the events of 7 February 2012

Past nominees presented by Nasheed didn't meet said criteria. Past nominees were:

- Mohamed Aslam – Housing Minister of Nasheed's government
- Shifa Mohamed – Education Minister of Nasheed's government and MDP activist
- Hassan Latheef – Human Resources, Youth and Sports Minister of Nasheed's government
- Hudha Ahmed – Cousin of Nasheed and MDP activist
- Aishath Velezinee – State Minister of Nasheed's government and MDP activist
- Bandhu Ibrahim Saleem – Married to a close relative of Nasheed
- Fareesha Abdulla – Under Secretary, Legal Affairs, at the President’s Office during Nasheed's administration
- Hisaan Hussain – Legal Affairs Secretary of the Nasheed administration and MDP activist
- Mariya Ahmed Didi – Former MDP Chairperson
- Lieut. Col. Zubair Ahmed Manik – Uncle of Nasheed

Waheed's government had viewed Nasheed's disregard of the criteria as an attempt to stall the CoNI's work.

== Report ==
The deadline for the report was originally set to 31 July 2012, but President Waheed extended it after the commission felt the need for an extension.

A day before the Commission released its report, Ahmed Saeed resigned from the Commission which the government condemned. Saeed said that he resigned due to the report being misleading and incomplete.

CoNI presented its report to President Mohamed Waheed Hassan on 30 August 2012 and soon after dissolved the commission.

=== Endorsements ===
Many International organizations and foreign countries endorsed the CoNI report. UK's Foreign Minister Alistair Burt welcomed the report and commended all the parties for trying to resolve it peacefully. The Secretary-General of the United Nations Ban Ki-moon urged all the parties to accept the findings and begin national dialogue to resolve political issues happening in the country. The Spokesperson of the United States Department of State Victoria Nuland called on all parties to accept the findings, to exercise restraint, obey the rule of law, and continue to express themselves in a peaceful and nonviolent manner.

=== Criticism ===
The Maldivian Democratic Party (MDP) accused the report of being deeply one sided and lacking accountability. Mohamed Nasheed originally accepted the report with limitations but later refuted entirely. ZNetwork questioned the legitimacy of the report as three of the commission members were Gayoom loyalists.

The International Federation for Human Rights had said that systemized omitifications were identified in the report which raises concerns about the accuracy of the report's conclusions.
