= 2011–2013 Maldives political crisis =

2011–2012 Maldives political crisis
- Date: May 2011 – March 2012 (with ongoing unrest and counter-protests) (10 months)
- Location: Maldives
- Caused by: Economic recession, low wages
- Methods: Peaceful protests, civil disobedience
- Result: Resignation of President Mohamed Nasheed; 2013 Maldivian presidential election

Parties
(Maldives) Maldivian opposition: Maldivian Democratic Party	Government of Maldives: Maldives National Defence Force; Maldives Police Service

Lead figures
More than 100 injured, 75 seriously; 350+ arrests	Many injured by the post-coup government's security reactions to the counter-protests

The 2011–2013 Maldives political crisis began as a series of peaceful protests that broke out in the Maldives on 1 May 2011. They would continue, eventually escalating into the resignation of President Mohamed Nasheed in disputed circumstances in February 2012. Demonstrators were protesting what they considered the government's mismanagement of the economy and were calling for the ouster of President Nasheed. The main political opposition party in the country, the Dhivehi Rayyithunge Party (Maldivian People's Party) led by the former president of the country Maumoon Abdul Gayoom (who was in power for over 30 years under an authoritarian system) accused President Nasheed of "talking about democracy but not putting it into practice." The protests occurred during the Arab Spring.

The primary cause for the protests was rising commodity prices and a poor economic situation in the country.

The protests led to a resignation of President Mohamed Nasheed on 7 February 2012, and the Vice President Mohamed Waheed Hassan Manik was sworn as the new President of Maldives. Nasheed stated the following day that he was forced out of office at gunpoint, while Waheed supporters maintained that the transfer of power was voluntary and constitutional. A later British Commonwealth meeting concluded that it could not "determine conclusively the constitutionality of the resignation of President Nasheed", but called for an international investigation. The Maldives' National Commission of Inquiry, appointed to investigate the matter, found that there was no evidence to support Nasheed's version of events.

In April 2012, it was announced that new elections were to be held in July 2013; they eventually took place later in 2013 after several delays.

== Background ==
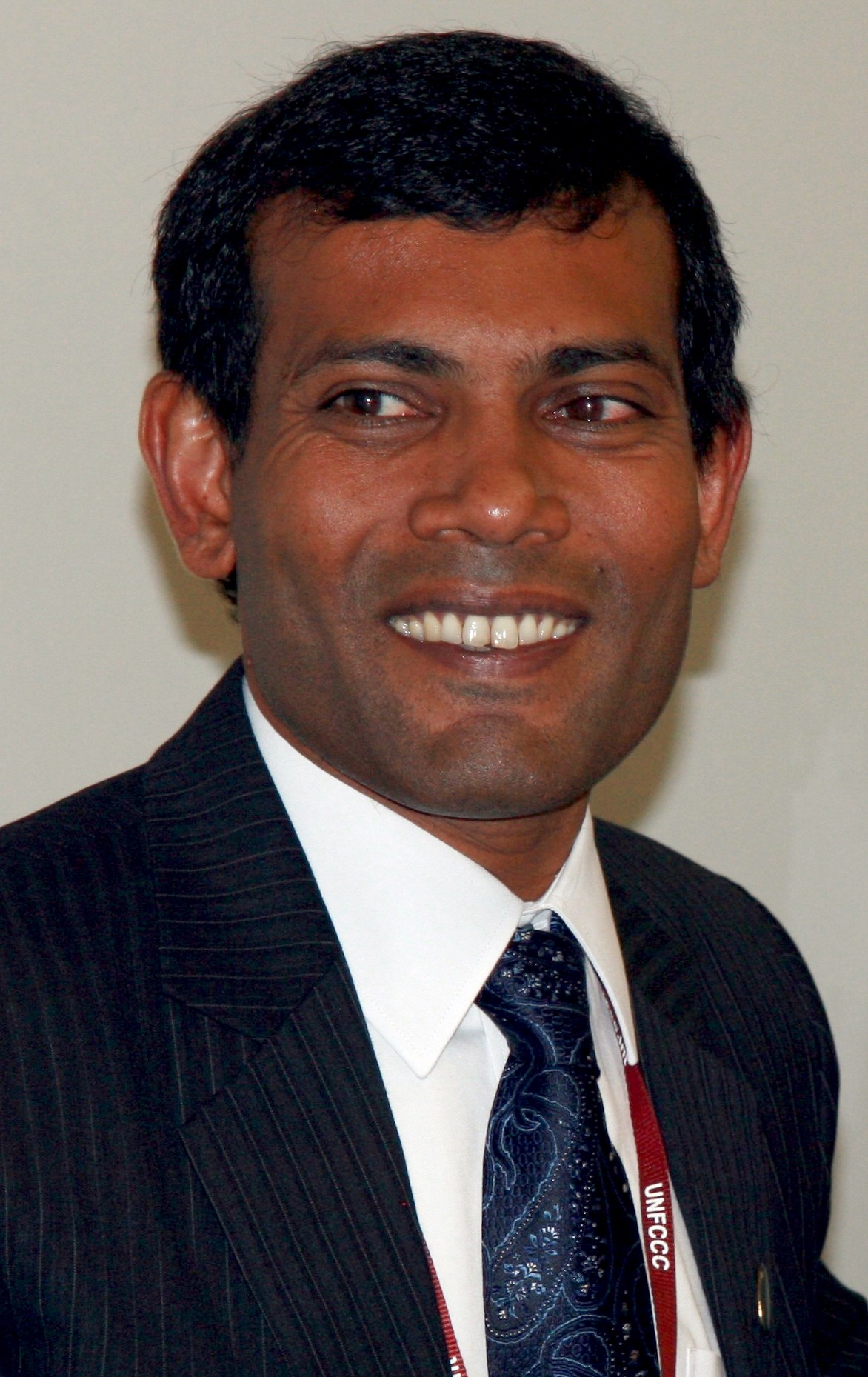
Mohamed Nasheed, the first democratically elected president of the Maldives, whom the protesters were demonstrating against.

Following nearly 30 years of rule by then-President Maumoon Gayoom, marked by allegations of autocratic rule, human rights abuses and corruption, violent protests in 2004 and 2005 led to a series of major reforms to the Maldives. The protests were organized by president Mohamed Nasheed and his party. Internal and international pressure forced then-President Gayoom to legalize political parties and improve the democratic process. Multi-party, multi-candidate elections were held on 9 October 2008, with 5 candidates running against Gayoom. A 28 October runoff election between Gayoom and Nasheed resulted in a 54-percent majority for Nasheed and his vice-president candidate Mohamed Waheed. A former journalist and political prisoner, Nasheed was a staunch critic of the Gayoom regime. In a speech prior to handing over power to his successor on 11 November 2008, Gayoom said: "I deeply regret any actions on my part ... (that) led to unfair treatment, difficulty or injustice for any Maldivian." At the time, Nasheed was detained and imprisoned several times since the age of 20, for heavy criticisms against Gayoom's administration and its officials in relation with election fraud and high-profile corruption. Nasheed was tortured and treated inhumanely in detention. Gayoom was the longest serving leader of any Asian country, serving for 30 years.

Mohamed Nasheed was elected president in 2008, becoming the first president to be elected by a multi-party democracy in the Maldives, and Dr. Waheed was the first elected vice president in the Maldives. Their election victory ended the 30-year dictatorship of President Gayoom. Nasheed and the new government implemented many reforms in the country. In 2009, President Nasheed was awarded the Anna Lindh Award for bringing democracy to the Maldives. He has received many awards and international recognition for his role in bringing democracy to the country.

Despite major political reforms, however, the Maldivian economy continued to suffer. Many factors have created for a poor economic situation in the Maldives, including the 2004 Indian Ocean earthquake and tsunami, which devastated the Maldivian economy and caused serious damage on most of the islands of the Maldives. The 2007–2008 world food price crisis caused major rise in inflation, especially on food prices and the late-2000s recession created a tough economic situation in developing nations. There were improvements in the economy, however, as the Maldives was rated up in 2011 from being considered "least developed country". Furthermore, Nasheed faced issues during mid-2010, when Parliament members began resigning en masse.

The Arab Spring broke out across the Arab world and had worldwide influence, including in the Maldives, which shares historic, cultural, regional and religious connections to the Middle Eastern countries facing protests. A GlobalPost article says that many in the international community consider Mohamed Nasheed the "Godfather of the Arab Spring" for his role in bringing democracy to the Maldives and the peaceful protests which led to his election as president.

== December 2011 demonstration ==
On 23 December 2011, the opposition held a mass symposium with as many as 20,000 people in the name of protecting Islam, which they believed Nasheed's government was unable to maintain in the country. The mass event became the foundation of a campaign that brought about social unrest within the capital city.

== Attempted arrest of Judge Abdulla Mohamed ==
On 16 January 2012, the Maldives military, on orders from the interior ministry, arrested Judge Abdulla Mohamed, the chief justice of the Maldives Criminal Court, on charges he was blocking the prosecution of corruption and human rights cases against allies of former President Gayoom.

Weeks of protests and demonstrations ensued, led by local police dissidents who opposed Nasheed's 16 January arrest order against Chief Justice Abdulla Mohamed.

On 7 February, Nasheed ordered the police and army to subdue the anti-government protesters. Police came out to protest against the government instead.

President Mohamed Nasheed resigned the same day by letter, and followed that with a televised public address. Nasheed later stated that he was forced to resign at gunpoint through a police mutiny and coup led by President Waheed. There have been disputes over exactly what happened that day. Nasheed's vice president, Mohamed Waheed Hassan Manik, was sworn in the same day as president in accordance with the Constitution at the People's Majlis in front of the Chief Justice. Waheed had opposed the arrest order and supported the opposition that forced Mohamed Nasheed to resign, but despite allegations he denied involvement in the coup.

== 2012 protests and resignation ==
Nasheed resigned on 7 February 2012 following weeks of protests after he ordered the military to arrest Abdulla Mohamed, the Chief Justice of the Criminal Court, on 16 January. Maldives police joined the protesters after refusing to use force on them and took over the state-owned television station, Television Maldives (TVM), forcibly switching the broadcast opposition party leader Maumoon Abdul Gayoom's call for people to come out to protest. The Maldives Army then clashed with police and other protesters who were with the police. All this time not one of the protester tried to invade any security facility including headquarters of MNDF. The Chief Justice was released from detention after Nasheed resigned from his post.

Vice President Mohamed Waheed Hassan Manik was sworn as the new president of Maldives. Former President Nasheed's supporters clashed with the security personnel during a rally on 12 July 2012, seeking ouster of President Waheed.

=== Use of force by Nasheed ===
Nasheed notoriously ordered very little use of force against the protests throughout most of the demonstrations.However, it was during his three years as president that the most frequent use of tear gas on public occurred. It was claimed that he ordered the police and security forces to use force against the protests in late January too as the protests were reaching escalating. It is claimed that police mutinied as a result of this.

=== Use of force by the opposition ===
Following the coup, the new government reacted very harshly to the counter-protests. Amnesty International has been very critical of the coup-implanted government's use of force. There have been many injured, many arrested, and at least one death committed by the post-coup government's security reactions to the counter-protests.

== Timeline ==
=== 2011 ===
==== May (initial protests) ====
The first protests occurred on 1 May 2011, with thousands gathering in the capital Malé. Protests continued the following day with thousands gathering in the capital and reported clashes with police and protesters. On 3 May, over 2,000 demonstrators clashed with Maldivian security forces in Male. Riot police reportedly used tear gas to disperse the protesters. Protests again broke out again on 4 May. Police used force to break up demonstrators and eyewitnesses say that police arrested a senior opposition activist. On May 5, protesters began their protests at Artificial Beach. In the fifth night of demonstrations Parliamentarian and DRP Youth Council President Mr. Ahmed Mahloof, Maldives national football team forward Assad Ali and several others was arrested.

==== December (opposition parties alliance) ====
An opposition alliance (Madhanee Ithihaad) was formed in December 2011, including all the parties that supported the President in his 2008 presidential race. Those parties included the Gaumee Party, the Jumhooree Party, and the Adhaalath Party (Islamist party). On 23 December, the capital city saw major opposition protests against Nasheed and his government. Former cabinet minister Mohamed Jameel Ahmed was repeatedly summoned to the police station in connection with the protests, at one point being detained at Dhoonidhoo, a Maldivian prison island.

On 23 December 2011, the opposition held a mass symposium with as many as 20,000 people in the name of protecting Islam, which they believed Nasheed's government was unable to maintain in the country. The mass event became the foundation of a campaign that brought about social unrest within the capital city of Male.

=== 2012 ===
==== January (arrest of Judge Abdulla Mohamed) ====
On 16 January 2012, the Maldives military, on orders from President Nasheed, arrested Judge Abdulla Mohamed, the Chief Justice of the Maldives Criminal Court, on charges he was blocking the prosecution of corruption and human rights cases against allies of former President Gayoom. The opposition claims that the arrest was unconstitutional.

The arrest of Judge Mohamed was the ignition for further protests. Due to the arrest of the judge the opposition parties' protests gained momentum and demanded Judge Abdulla Mohamed's immediate release. During the detention of the judge, the Human Rights Commission of the Maldives (HRCM) was able to visit him in his place of detention, a military training base, and confirm his safety. Opposition leaders also called for an independent investigation into the constitutionality of the arrest, a call echoed by the HRCM, the Judicial Services Commission, the Prosecutor General's Office, the International Commission of Jurists, Amnesty International, and the United Nations Human Rights Commissioner. Military and police rejected the orders by High Court to release Abdulla Mohamed.

The opposition's protest in the Republic Square lasted for 22 days. On 6 February 2012, the Maldives Police Service declined to use force to control or disperse the protests and joined the protest.

==== February ====
There was an escalation in the protests and some protesters attacked the opposition-linked VTV television station. The police began a mutiny in late January. On 7 February, the protests reached their climax, with the military firing tear gas at demonstrators and police who were swarming the National Defence Force headquarters. In early hours of 7 February 2012, President Mohamed Nasheed was seen inside the military headquarters. The Maldives National Defense Force subsequently had a standoff with police who had joined the protesters, in which the MNDF fired rubber bullets into the crowd. (The President's Office, however, denied these reports.) On 7 February, Nasheed ordered the police and army to subdue the anti-government protesters and use force against the public. Police came out to protest against unlawful orders given to them. Amid the chaos the President resigned in front of the media after submitting a hand written resignation letter to the Majlis, as stipulated in the constitution. Following the forced resignation on 7 February 2012, Nasheed immediately informed the international community of the events surrounding his ousting and asked for early elections to preserve the country's fledgling democratic system.

President Nasheed was claimed to have resigned stating that he wanted to stop the violence. Nasheed and his supporters called it a coup d'état (Nasheed claims he was forced out virtually at gunpoint, though this remains disputed). Nasheed's vice president, Mohamed Waheed Hassan Manik, was sworn in as president to replace Nasheed at the People's Majlis in front of the Chief Justice.

On 23 February 2012, the Commonwealth suspended the Maldives from its democracy and human rights watchdog while the ousting was being investigated, and backed Nasheed's call for elections before the end of 2012.

==== February and March (counter protests) ====
Counter protests broke out following the coup, in favor of ousted Nasheed. The protesters demonstrated against the coup and in favor of Nasheed. Supporters of Nasheed's political party, the Maldivian Democratic Party (MDP), led massive demonstrations.

On 8 February, the MDP convened an emergency executive meeting and called for its members to go into streets. President Mohamed Nasheed then attempted to lead the protesters to the Republic Square. Before his march reached the square, however, the Maldives Police Service dispersed the protest with batons and pepper spray.

On 1 March, thousands of protestors who supported Mohamed Nasheed rallied to prevent Mohamed Waheed Hassan Manik from entering Parliament.

Amnesty International has raised concerns of human rights abuses during this round of protests. Amnesty claims that there was excessive use of force by security forces against the protesters backing Nasheed, including sexual harassment of female prisoners. An Amnesty International spokesperson condemned the police tactics as "brutal" and "outright human rights violations".

==== April (parliamentary by-election) ====
On 14 April, parliamentary by-election were held, the first since the protests began, with Mohamed Waheed's party winning.

Mohamed Musthafa, an MDP candidate and former Member of Parliament, said that he refused to accept the result of the by-election, claiming that there were "major issues in Guraidhoo" and other issues (Guraidhoo is an island which reportedly registered abnormally high voter turn-out in the by-elections).

=== 2013 ===
Political instability continued into 2013, with a planned presidential election being delayed three times. Abdulla Yameen won the last run-off vote which was held in November, and Nasheed conceded defeat.

== Nasheed coup allegations ==
Nasheed and his supporters maintained that he was ousted in a coup, but this claim was disputed by Hassan's supporters, the National Commission of Inquiry, and the governments of the US, UK, India, and the Commonwealth of Nations.

Nasheed, in an interview with The Hindu after he was ousted, claimed that there was a plotted coup. He said: "I was given a seven-page letter by the General then in charge of military intelligence warning of a plot, to overthrow my government, by Maumoon Abdul Gayoom. However, the officer concerned was promptly replaced [by the Army]." As for why he resigned, Nasheed said: "I knew this was going to end either with many deaths or with my being lynched. So I agreed to resign". He said it was "shocking" how hastily the governments of India and the US "stepped in to recognise the new regime – the coup."

Nasheed and his foreign minister, Ahmed Naseem, claimed in interviews that Islamic extremists were upset with his rule and were behind the coup. Nasheed also claimed that wealthy resort owners were behind the coup. Nasheed had worked to amend the tax code so that wealthy resort owners paid more taxes. Nasheed said: "The coup was largely financed by resort owners" and that "I suppose they [the resort owners] liked the old order of corruption." The World Socialist Web Site, the online news center of the International Committee of the Fourth International claimed that the coup was backed by the United States and that United States and Indian envoys intervened in the crisis to back the coup.

The coup interpretation was also backed by UK MP David Amess, Chairman of the All Party Parliamentary Group to the Maldives, but contradicted by UK Prime Minister David Cameron, who asserted that Nasheed "had resigned". Nasheed's successor and opposition forces also stated that the transfer of power was voluntary. A later British Commonwealth meeting concluded that it could not "determine conclusively the constitutionality of the resignation of President Nasheed", but called for an international investigation. The Maldives' National Commission of Inquiry, appointed to investigate the matter, found that there was no evidence to support Nasheed's version of events. The US State Department and the Commonwealth of Nations Secretary Kamalesh Sharma welcomed the release of the report, and called on Maldivians to abide by its findings.

== International reactions ==
- The governments of the US and India quickly recognised the new government.
- UN Secretary-General Ban Ki-moon raised concerns and called for quick and fair elections.
- The Commonwealth of Nations urged early elections (by the end of 2012) and immediate dialogue between the parties.
