= 1999 Maldivian parliamentary election =

| ← 1994 | 19 November 1999 | 2005 → |
- All 50 seats in the People's Majlis; 25 seats needed for a majority
| Party | Seats |
|---|---|
| Independents | 42 |
| Presidential appointees | 8 |
This lists parties that won seats. See the complete results below.

Parliamentary elections were held in the Maldives on 19 November 1999. As there were no political parties at the time, all 127 candidates ran as independents. Voter turnout was 77.4%.

== Results ==
| Party | Votes | % | Seats |
|---|---|---|---|
| Independents | | | 42 |
| Presidential appointees | | | 8 |
| Total | | | 50 |
| Registered voters/turnout | 128,000 | 77.4 | |
Source: IPU
