= Abdulla Mohamed =

Former Chief Judge of the Maldivian Criminal Court

Honourable Judge Abdulla Mohamed

Chief Judge of the Maldives Criminal Court
- Incumbent
- Assumed office 21 September 2008
- Preceded by: Abdulla Areef

Personal details
- Born: 27 April 1966 (age 60) Un'gulu, Raa Atoll, Maldives
- Spouse: Aminath Shareef
- Children: 4 children
- Education: Al-Azhar University

Judge Abdulla Mohamed (born 27 April 1966) is the former Chief Judge of the Criminal Court of the Maldives. In January 2012 he was arrested after releasing a government critic. After popular and judicial protests, he was freed and President Mohamed Nasheed resigned.

== Personal life ==
Mohamed holds a BA (Hon.) in Shari'a and Law from Al-Azhar University in Egypt. Before joining the judicial sector he was a teacher at the Institute of Islamic Studies and Center for Higher Secondary Education in Malé. He started as a Judge at the Criminal Court and was promoted to Chief Judge after his predecessor was selected to be a Justice of the Supreme Court.

He is currently married to Aminath Shareef. He has four children.

== Arrest ==
On 16 January 2012, Mohamed was arrested by the Maldives National Defence Force (MNDF) for 14 instances of obstruction of police duty, including "ordering unlawful investigations, withholding warrants for up to four days, limiting the issuance of warrants to himself exclusively at times, disregarding decisions of higher courts, strategically delaying cases involving opposition members, and barring media from corruption trials", according to then Home Minister Hassan Afeef. Afeef further alleged that Mohamed "twisted and interpreted laws so they could not be enforced against certain politicians" and stood accused of "accepting bribes to release convicts". The arrest came after Mohamed had made a ruling to support the release of government critic Mohamed Jameel Ahmed (who had claimed that President Mohamed Nasheed was conspiring against Islam with the help of Christians and Jews) and also after Mohamed had allegedly tried to block a police summons containing allegations that he was corrupt and that his rulings were politically biased. A government statement quoted foreign minister Ahmed Naseem as saying that Mohamed was arrested "for corruption, in particular for allowing his judicial decisions to be determined by political and personal affiliations and interests".

== Aftermath ==
The arrest led to street protests and a boycott of sessions by all the nation's courts. The Prosecutor General's office stated that under the constitution a judge can be arrested only with the consent of the Supreme Court, and the Maldivian Supreme Court, Prosecutor General and Judicial Services Commission (JSC), as well as the office of the United Nations High Commissioner for Human Rights, all declared the arrest illegal and called for Mohamed's release.

The MNDF refused to comply with the High Court and Supreme Court orders to release Mohamed, and ignored a High Court order to produce him issued on 26 January.

President Mohamed Nasheed resigned on 7 February 2012. After the resignation, he claimed that he was forced to resign by a coup d’état. On 30 August, the Maldives' National Commission of Inquiry stated that it had found no evidence to support Nasheed's version of events, a verdict supported by the United States and the Commonwealth of Nations.

Preceded by Abdulla Areef	Chief Judge Criminal Court; 2008–present	Succeeded by Incumbent
