= 2018 Maldivian presidential election =

- 23 September 2018
- Turnout: 89.22%
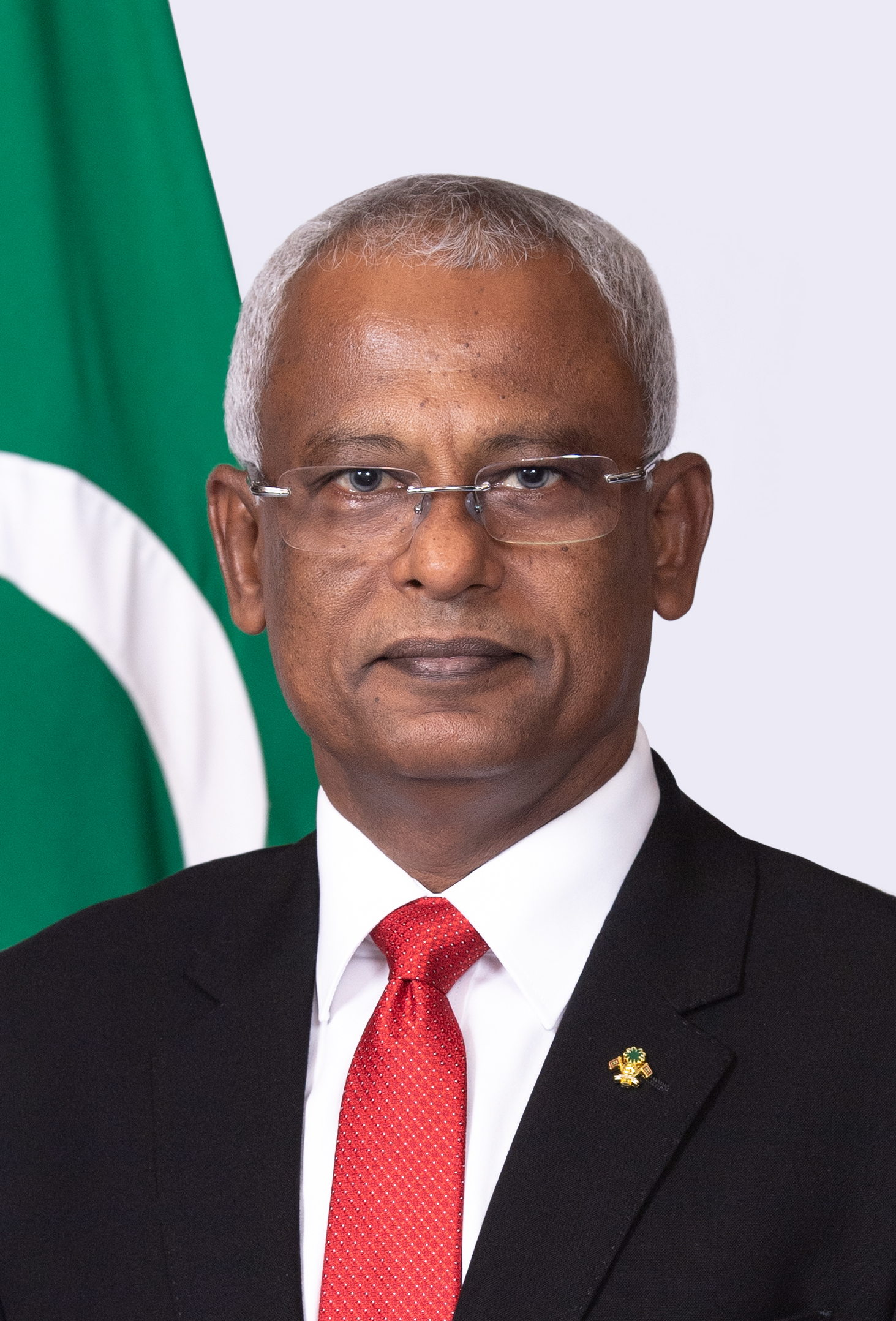

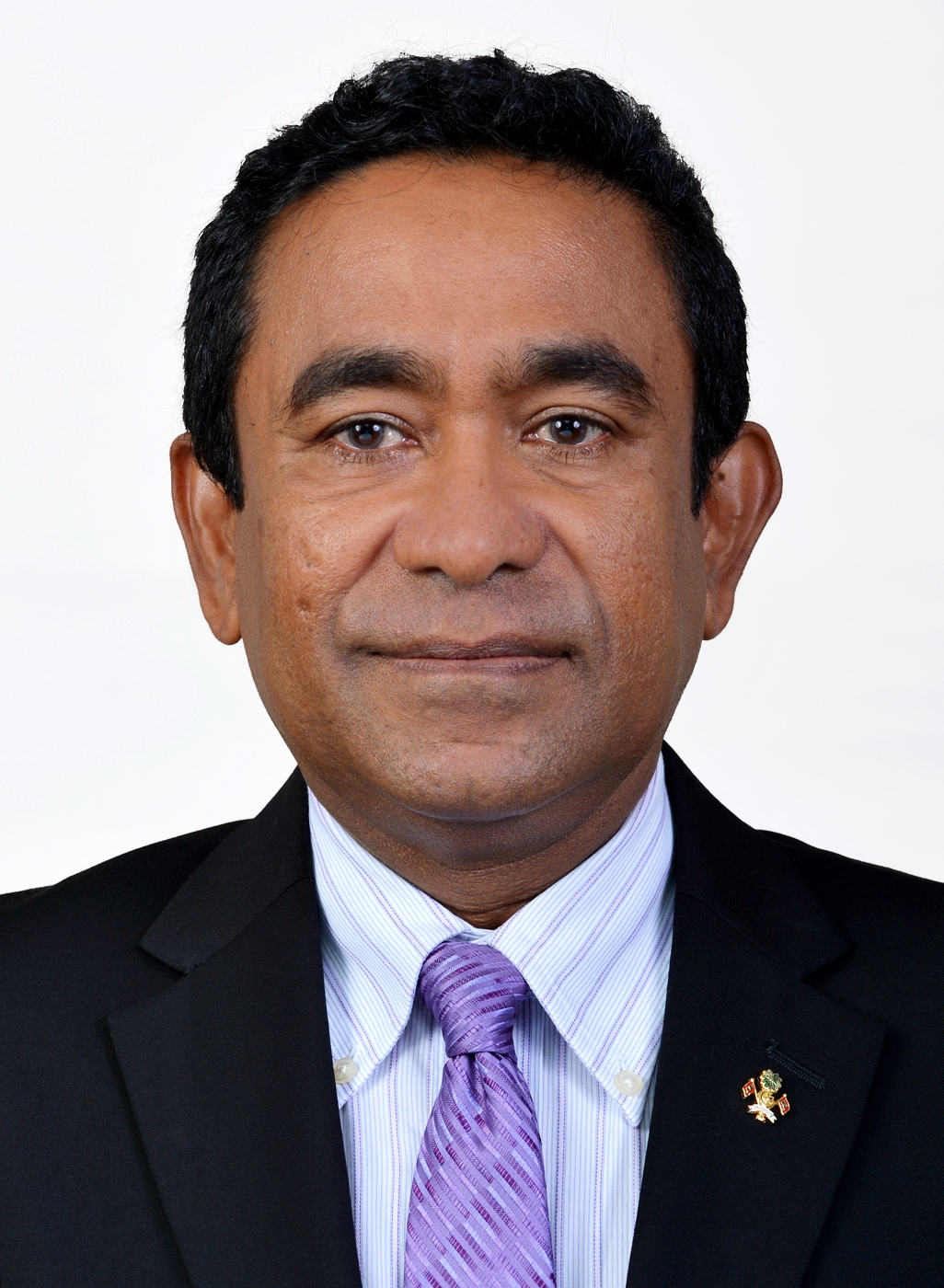
Nominee	Ibrahim Mohamed Solih	Abdulla Yameen
Party	MDP	PPM
Running mate	Faisal Naseem	Mohamed Shaheem
Popular vote	134,705	96,052
Percentage	58.38%	41.62%
- Results by atoll
President before election
Abdulla Yameen
PPM
Elected President
Ibrahim Mohamed Solih
MDP

Presidential elections were held in the Maldives on Sunday, 23 September 2018. Incumbent president Abdulla Yameen of the Progressive Party of Maldives (PPM) was seeking re-election for a second five-year term. His only challenger was Ibrahim Mohamed Solih of the Maldivian Democratic Party (MDP), who was nominated as the joint candidate of a coalition of opposition parties.

The result was a surprise victory for Solih, who received over 58% of the vote and was elected as the seventh President of the Maldives. He assumed office on 17 November 2018. Solih is the country's third democratically elected president since Mohamed Nasheed's victory over Maumoon Abdul Gayoom in the 2008 elections which ended a 30-year incumbency.

Yameen is the fourth consecutive Maldivian president to have at some point lost a bid for re-election. Namely, Yameen himself came to office by defeating former president Mohamed Nasheed, who was running for a second non-consecutive term in 2013, after having resigned in 2012 during the 2011–12 Maldives political crisis. Nasheed's successor in office, his Vice President Mohamed Waheed Hassan also sought re-election in 2013, but decided not to contest the re-run after the initial election was annulled. Finally, Nasheed had been elected in the 2008 election by defeating long-term incumbent Maumoon Abdul Gayoom.

== Electoral system ==
The Maldives has presidential system of governance where the president is both the head of state and head of government. Once in office, they could be re-elected to a second 5-year term, which is the limit allowed by the constitution.

In the Maldives, the president is elected by a simple majority or more than fifty percent (50%) of the votes cast through direct-vote. When no candidate from the list of candidates does not receive a majority of the votes cast, the election then proceeds to a runoff (or second round), which are mandated to be held no less than 21 days following the election between the two candidates who received the most votes in the first round. In a runoff round, the candidates among the two who receive a majority of more than 50% of the valid votes cast, are elected to the office of the President.

The official results of the election are announced by the Elections Commission and published in the Government Gazette within seven days of the voting day of the presidential elections.

== Candidates ==
Incumbent President Abdulla Yameen ran for re-election. In February 2018 former President Mohamed Nasheed announced that he intended to contest the elections as the Maldivian Democratic Party candidate. However, in June 2018 the party and its coalition, the Maldives United Opposition, selected Ibrahim Mohamed Solih as its candidate after Nasheed withdrew his candidacy.

== Campaign ==
President Abdulla Yameen ran on a campaign of economic development and Islamism aimed at "courting religious vote", claiming that the opposition was supported by Christian priests.

During Yameen's tenure, he sought closer ties with the Chinese government, signed a free trade agreement in 2014 and hired Chinese companies to build infrastructure projects funded by loans lent by the Chinese government, allowing them to expand the reach of their controversial Belt and Road Initiative to the Maldives and by extension, the Indian Ocean. Opposition activists and politicians criticized this move, stating that Yameen's government was taking on an increasingly unmanageable amount of debt to the Chinese government, allowing the country to be entangled in its debt-trap, with some estimating that China held 80% of the Maldives’ sovereign debt, accounting for one-fourths of its GDP. There were also major concerns that the government's pursuance of closer relations with China would undermine their historically close relations with India.

A few days before the elections, Yameen promised to build housing for all citizens, as well as scrapping fines for traffic violations and utility bills. Several hundred prisoners were also freed.

== Conduct ==
Prior to the elections, there were concerns about vote rigging by the government as Yameen had appointed one of his supporters, Ahmed Shareef, as head of the Electoral Commission. International observers were banned from monitoring the elections and foreign media was heavily restricted.

The police raided MDP's headquarters on the day before the elections, claiming there was an investigation into "distributing money to buy votes". The raid was condemned by the American and British governments. The European Union had said that it would not send election observers because the Maldives had failed to meet the basic conditions for monitoring, and the U.S. had threatened to sanction Maldivian officials if the elections were not free and fair. President Yameen had previously restricted observers from seeing individual ballots, and had appointed 107 members of the ruling PPM party to administer and count the vote. Some election observers were also denied entry to the country because they were not given a visa, despite being registered with the Electoral Commission. Foreign journalists were also required to have a Maldivian sponsor to participate, and some observers described having their visa applications denied for trivial reasons.

On election day, voting was extended for three hours due to long queues.

=== List of organizations represented by registered observers and monitors ===
Source: Elections Commission

==== International observers ====
- Sri Lanka – Election Commission
- Philippines – Commission on Elections
- Romania – Permanent Electoral Authority
- Organisation of Islamic Cooperation – Delegation from the Organisation of Islamic Cooperation
- Thailand – Election Commission
- Malaysia – Election Commission
- Palestine – Central Elections Commission
- United Kingdom – All-party parliamentary group
- Hungary – Hungarian delegation
- ACRE – Delegation of the Alliance of Conservatives and Reformists in Europe
- ANFREL – The Asian Network for Free Elections delegation (Note: Some, if not all members of the organization reported not receiving a visa, and thus were barred from entering the country)

==== International monitors ====
- United States – The New York Times, The Associated Press, Strategic News International
- Switzerland – Swiss Radio and Television
- India – The Economic Times, The Wire, The Hindu, WION
- France – Le Figaro, AFP
- Japan – Yomiuri Shimbun, Asahi Shimbun, NHK, Kyodo News

==== Rejected international monitors ====
- United Kingdom – The Economist
- Canada – Thomson Reuters
- India – All India Radio & Doordarshan News
- Germany – ARD

== Results ==
Candidate	Running mate	Party	Votes	%
Ibrahim Mohamed Solih	Faisal Naseem	Maldivian Democratic Party	134,705	58.38
Abdulla Yameen	Mohamed Shaheem	Progressive Party of Maldives	96,052	41.62
Total			230,757	100.00
Valid votes			230,757	98.66
Invalid/blank votes			3,132	1.34
Total votes			233,889	100.00
Registered voters/turnout			262,135	89.22
Source: Elections Commission of the Maldives

=== Results by Atoll ===
Results by atoll and geographical area (2018 presidential election)
Atoll / area	Ibrahim Mohamed Solih (MDP)		Abdulla Yameen (PPM)		Total valid votes
Atoll / area	Votes	%	Votes	%	Total valid votes
HA	6,655	54.02%	5,665	45.98%	12,320
HDh	7,572	55.51%	6,069	44.49%	13,641
Sh	5,117	52.05%	4,713	47.95%	9,830
N	5,239	55.81%	4,149	44.19%	9,388
R	6,885	52.17%	6,311	47.83%	13,196
B	5,265	58.02%	3,810	41.98%	9,075
Lh	4,632	57.19%	3,467	42.81%	8,099
K	4,557	51.70%	4,258	48.30%	8,815
AA	3,213	64.12%	1,798	35.88%	5,011
ADh	4,650	65.55%	2,444	34.45%	7,094
V	847	55.76%	672	44.24%	1,519
M	2,170	49.17%	2,243	50.83%	4,413
F	1,719	49.27%	1,770	50.73%	3,489
Dh	2,587	51.78%	2,409	48.22%	4,996
Th	5,151	56.83%	3,913	43.17%	9,064
L	5,792	55.29%	4,684	44.71%	10,476
GA	4,634	56.43%	3,578	43.57%	8,212
GDh	6,591	57.46%	4,880	42.54%	11,471
Gn	3,862	56.45%	2,979	43.55%	6,841
S	12,100	67.76%	5,758	32.24%	17,858
Malé City	26,736	61.44%	16,783	38.56%	43,519
Overseas	3,480	70.12%	1,483	29.88%	4,963
Industrial areas	477	49.02%	496	50.98%	973
Jails	1,175	68.83%	532	31.17%	1,707
Resorts	3,599	75.18%	1,188	24.82%	4,787
National total	134,705	58.38%	96,052	41.62%	230,757

== Aftermath ==
Following the announcement of the results, Yameen challenged the outcome in the Supreme Court in October, claiming that the election had been rigged. He alleged that ballot papers treated to make any votes cast for him vanish and that voters planning on voting for him were given pens with disappearing ink. His appeal was unanimously rejected by the court's judges, who stated that he had failed to prove the claims.

== Geopolitical implications ==
Maldives is of high geo-strategic importance due to its proximity to Indian Ocean sea lines of communication, Indian Navy base in Lakshadweep Islands and US Navy base in Diego Garcia. Abdulla Yameen was seen by India as being too close to regional rival China. India was particularly alarmed about Chinese Belt and Road Initiative projects in the Maldives and Chinese investments in Maldives were seen by India and the United States as a part of China's 'String of Pearls' strategy. On the other hand, Ibrahim Mohamed Solih had made repairing of ties with India as a key election plank. According to The Nikkei, India's Modi administration had "spared no expense supporting local opposition parties by allotting tens of millions of dollars to intelligence agencies".

The Financial Times declared the victory of Solih as a "diplomatic win" for India. Following the declaration of election results, India's Prime Minister Narendra Modi called Ibrahim Mohamed Solih to congratulate him on his victory. Solih reaffirmed commitment towards rebuilding ties with India and declared Maldives to be "India's closest ally". The Observer Research Foundation noted that following the election results, "China will mount a major effort to protect its strategic investments and ongoing projects in Maldives" and that India will have to "use other tools to ensure that Maldives does not cross strategic red lines like allowing China to build military and security facilities on any island."

== Reactions ==
- China – Chinese Foreign Ministry spokesman Geng Shuang congratulated Solih, while calling for "continuity and stability" in the Maldives. He further added that China respected the choice of Maldivian people and wanted to strengthen their traditional friendship.
- India – India's Prime Minister Narendra Modi called Ibrahim Mohamed Solih and conveyed his "good wishes for the strengthening of democracy, peace and prosperity in the country". India's Ministry of External Affairs released a statement congratulating "Ibrahim Mohamed Solih on his victory". The ministry further added, "this election marks not only the triumph of democratic forces in the Maldives, but also reflects the firm commitment to the values of democracy and the rule of law. In keeping with our 'Neighbourhood First' Policy, India looks forward to working closely with the Maldives in further deepening our partnership."
- Pakistan – Foreign Ministry of Pakistan spokesman Dr. Mohammad Faisal tweeted that, "Pakistan fully supports the democratic process in Maldives and will work with the new government to further enhance the partnership between the two countries".
- United States – State Department spokesperson Heather Nauert issued a statement, saying that "the United States congratulates Ibrahim Mohamed Solih on his victory in Maldives' September 23 presidential election. The United States commends the Maldivian people for their commitment to the democratic process and exceptional level of participation in an election that has ushered in a new chapter in their country's history. We expect all parties to respect the will of the Maldivian people and support a peaceful transition of power through the November 17 inauguration."
