= Bruce Robertson (judge) =

New Zealand judge (born 1944)

The Honourable Sir Bruce Robertson KNZM
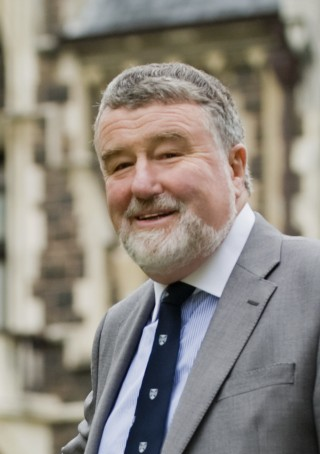
- Robertson in 2010

Justice of the Court of Appeal
- In office 2005–2010

Personal details
- Born: 15 February 1944 (age 82) Dunedin, New Zealand
- Spouse: Lindsay Joyce Radford (m. 1969)
- Children: 3
- Education: Otago Boys' High School
- Alma mater: University of Otago; University of Virginia

Sir James Bruce Robertson KNZM (born 15 February 1944), generally known as Bruce Robertson, is a retired judge of the Court of Appeal of New Zealand, where he was appointed in May 2005.

== Early life and family ==
Born in Dunedin on 15 February 1944, Robertson was educated at Wakari School and Otago Boys' High School. He is a graduate of the University of Otago and the University of Virginia. He holds an honorary LLD from the University of Otago.

In 1969, Robertson married Lindsay Joyce Radford, and the couple went on to have three children.

== Legal career ==
Before becoming a High Court judge in 1987, Robertson was a partner in the law firm Ross, Dowling, Marquet and Griffin. One of his earliest appointments after his appointment to the High Court was to chair the Search and Search Warrants Committee, which published its final report in 1988. From 2001 until his appointment as a member of the Court of Appeal, he was President of the New Zealand Law Commission. Robertson was also a judge on the Court of Appeal of Vanuatu.

Robertson is also the consulting editor for Adams on Criminal Law and Adams on Criminal Law Student Edition.

In 2012, Robertson served as one of the legal advisers of the Commission of National Inquiry.

In 2013, Robertson was appointed as chairperson of the Sports Tribunal of New Zealand.

Robertson was appointed as the New Zealand Commissioner of Security Warrants in July 2013.

He has been an international commercial court judge for the Qatar International Court since 2013.

== Honours ==
In the 2010 New Year Honours, Robertson was appointed a Knight Companion of the New Zealand Order of Merit for services as a judge of the High Court and the Court of Appeal.
