= Alhan Fahmy =

Maldivian politician (born 1980)

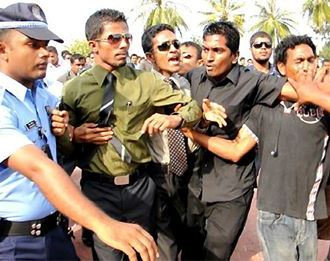

Member of Parliament
- In office 2009–2014
- Constituency: Feydhoo

Personal details
- Born: 2 January 1980 (age 46) Malé, Maldives
- Party: Independent
- Other political affiliations: Jumhooree Party; Maldivian Democratic Party (2010–2012); Dhivehi Rayyithunge Party
- Website: alhanfahmy.com (archived)

Alhan Fahmy (born 2 January 1980) is a Maldivian politician who served as a parliament member of the 17th People's Majlis sitting of Maldives representing the Addu Atoll Feydhoo constituency representing the then opposition party Dhivehi Rayyithunge Party under the leadership of former president Maumoon Abdul Gayoom.

== Political career ==
Alhan was elected as a parliament member, under the flagship of Dhivehi Rayyithunge Party (DRP). He was one of the youngest members elected endorsed by then President Maumoon Abdul Gayoom. Alhan changed his alliance from DRP to the Maldivian Democratic party citing undemocratic sects in the DRP, more controversially following the vote he abstained in no confidence motion against the then foreign Minister Ahmed Shaheed.

Alhan Fahmy was elected as the Vice President of then ruling Party, Maldivian Democratic Party (MDP) on 1 May 2011, beating the former housing Minister of President Mohamed Nasheeds's Cabinet Mr. Mohamed Aslam by 13,598 votes.

On 30 April 2012, along with President of MDP Dr. Ibrahim Didi, Alhan was ousted from his post as the Vice president of the MDP by the party's national council in an emergency sitting. Both the politicians later resigned from MDP and signed to Jumhooree Party.

== Stabbing ==
On 1 February 2014, Alhan fahmy was stabbed while in a meeting with an opposition parliament member in an open restaurant. He was rushed to ADK Hospital and later transferred under emergency to Sri Lanka for further treatment.

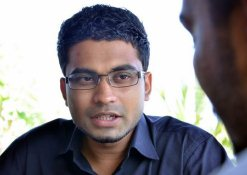
Dr. Wisham in an interview with the media

In his briefing to media, the treating doctor in Maldives, Dr. Mohamed Wisham stated that Alhan was stabbed in his back in the thoracic spine, and that he was not initially able to move his right leg at all immediately after the stabbing. Dr. Wisham also stated that since the injury has been sustained to the spinal cord itself, Alhan has a 50/50 percent chance for a full recovery and to be able to walk without aid.

== Supreme Court Judge Scandal ==
In July 2013, an alleged videotape of Supreme court Judge Ali Hameed was leaked online. In the investigation of the case, Alhan was summoned to the Maldives Police Service on 15 August 2013, along with then chairman of Maldives National Broadcasting Commission (MNBC) Mr. Ahmed Faiz.

== Controversies ==
In May 2022, the Financial Intelligence Unit (FIU) of the Maldives Monetary Authority (MMA), filed a police case against Fahmy in connection with an alleged Ponzi scheme carried out by his company, King's Forex Trading Company. The investigation aimed to determine if there were any instances of money laundering linked to the scheme. Mr Fahmy, facing legal challenges, decided to sue the MMA over the losses his company incurred. His lawyers argued that since Maldivian legislation and regulations did not explicitly criminalize forex trading, it could not be deemed illegal. The situation highlighted the seriousness of the alleged Ponzi scheme and the potential financial repercussions for the investors, a great majority of whom did not receive their returns or money back.
