= Salt Spring Coffee =

Canadian coffee company

Salt Spring Coffee is a business that produces roasted coffee beans and operates a coffee kiosk.

Headquartered in Richmond, British Columbia, the company attempts to differentiate itself in the market by following sustainability values in their corporate vision statement. The Salt Spring Coffee Company operates a kiosk at the Tsawwassen Ferry Terminal. Their coffees are marketed as by being Fair to Farmer Direct, certified organic, fair trade, shade grown, and carbon neutral. They maintain organic certification through the Pacific Agricultural Certification Society.

== History ==
The company was founded in 1996 by Mickey McLeod and his wife Robbyn Scott who operated an organic market garden on the island. They had been roasting coffee beans for their own consumption but eventually added their coffee to their product line.

To become carbon neutral, the company audited their energy consumption, took measures to reduce their emissions, and purchased carbon offsets. Their audit found they produce 263 tonnes of carbon dioxide equivalent in 2007, half of which came from roasting their beans. They purchase their offsets from the Carbonfund Foundation and Offsetters. The company claims to the first carbon neutral coffee sold in Canada. Salt Spring Coffee was recognized by the David Suzuki Foundation in their 2010 report Doing Business in a New Climate. The report outlines Salt Springs Coffee's Carbon Cool initiative, which set out in 2007 with the goal of offering one of the world’s first carbon neutral cups of coffee.

== Locations ==
Salt Spring Coffee owns and operates a kiosk at Tsawwassen Ferry Terminal. The Ganges location on Salt Spring Island closed in September 2017. A third cafe was previously located on Vancouver's Main Street.

== Move from Salt Spring ==
Salt Spring Coffee applied for rezoning of a residential lot on Salt Spring Island in the summer of 2008. The company wanted to relocate its offices and roasting facility into a new 1,115-square-metre building. Residents of the rural neighbourhood, including artist Robert Bateman, expressed concerns about the introduction of industrial zoning (a half-kilometre from Ford Lake) including: commercial and industrial sprawl along the main road, odour concerns, and emissions effecting a nearby protected wetland. An Islands Trustee has "cited outstanding odour concerns, the large number of [proposed] covenants, and the threat of commercial and industrial sprawl in the rural neighbourhood as her main reasons for opposing the application." The company was seeking to build the world's first LEED certified coffee roasting facility, however the application for rezoning was denied Following the refusal, the company sought alternative locations in the Victoria and Vancouver areas.

In January 2009 the company began roasting production in a Richmond distribution warehouse, as they searched for an appropriate permanent location. Shortly after employees of a neighbouring business, International Cosmeticare, complained of symptoms including "nausea, eye and skin irritation, headaches, coughing, sneezing and breathing difficulties" which they blamed on the roasting. Salt Spring Coffee had been using a thermal oxidizer, which is supposed to control air pollution, but Metro Vancouver (the agency which regulates air emissions) had not yet approved the company's permit and it was speculated that the thermal oxidizer was not installed correctly or it was not being maintained. WorkSafe BC ordered the company to make changes to the exhaust system so that the air is not recirculated into the building and to not roast during weekday business hours.
