= B4E Business for the Environment =

International conference for business and environment dialogue

The B4E Business for the Environment Summit (commonly abbreviated as B4E or B4E Summit) is an international platform for dialogue and partnership for the environment.

Issues addressed at these summits include energy, natural resource security, climate change, water management, and biodiversity conservation, among others.

Past speakers at Summits include international luminaries like Ban Ki-moon, Al Gore, Helen Clark, and Göran Persson, the current Presidents of South Korea, Indonesia and Guyana, business leaders such as Nam Yong, Ben Verwaayen, Jochen Zeitz, Sir Richard Branson, Barbara Kux and renowned experts like David Suzuki, Janine Benyus and Amory Lovins representing civil society. The Summits also involve international NGOs and agencies like WWF, Greenpeace, the Rocky Mountain Institute, the World Food Programme, and UNDP in their inclusive dialogues.

Official outcome declarations from the Summit discussions reflect commitments from stakeholders on the need to embrace innovative solutions for environmental issues and are used to provide input to the UN Climate Change Conferences and the United Nations Conference on Sustainable Development.

== Discussion points ==
- Climate action and corporate responsibility Reasons for discussion: As the urgency of the climate crisis grows, companies are playing an increasingly important role in reducing greenhouse gas emissions. This topic examines how companies can take concrete steps to achieve net zero emissions in line with global climate change goals such as the Paris Agreement. Discussions may include strategies to reduce carbon emissions, implementation of renewable energy sources, and the role of corporate leadership in driving change.
- Sustainable supply chain Reasons for discussion: From resource extraction to production and distribution, the environmental impact of supply chains is significant. This topic focuses on how companies can build more sustainable supply chains by adopting circular economy principles, reducing waste, and ensuring ethical sourcing. Addressing this issue is critical to reducing the overall environmental impact of global trade.
- Biodiversity and ecosystem services Reasons for discussion: Loss of biodiversity poses a threat to ecosystems and the services they provide, including pollination, water purification, and climate regulation. This topic explores how businesses can contribute to biodiversity conservation through responsible land use, habitat restoration, and sustainable agriculture. The discussion is important as businesses seek to mitigate their impacts on natural ecosystems and comply with new regulations.
- Green Innovation and Technology Reason for discussion: Innovation in green technologies is essential to achieving sustainable development. This topic explores the latest advances in renewable energy, energy efficiency, sustainable materials, and waste reduction technologies. Businesses must take the lead in adopting these innovations to remain competitive and reduce their environmental impact.
- Sustainable Finance and Investment Why this is happening: The financial sector has a key role to play in achieving sustainable development by channeling capital into green projects and companies. This topic explores the growth of sustainable finance, including green bonds, ESG (environmental, social, governance) investing, and impact investing. This discussion is important for understanding how financial markets can support the transition to a low-carbon economy.

== History ==
Past B4E Summits were convened for the last five years in Singapore, Paris, Copenhagen during the COP 15, Seoul, Mexico City, Cancún during the COP 16 and Jakarta in partnership with the United Nations, WWF, Global Initiatives and host Governments where the summits took place.

B4E Global Summit 2007 and 2008 Singapore
The first and second B4E Summits were held in Singapore. The guest of honour at the event was Singapore's then-Minister for National Development, Mah Bow Tan, and distinguished speakers included Achim Steiner, Georg Kell, David Suzuki, H.E. Maumoon Abdul Gayoom, Adam Werbach and Zhang Yue.

B4E Global Summit 2009 Paris
Titled “The Green Imperative: Leadership, Innovation and Technology”, B4E Global Summit 2009 took place in Paris, France. Notable speakers at the 2009 summit included Joseph Alcamo, Pavan Sukdev and Prince Hassan bin Talal, as well as repeated appearances by Achim Steiner and Georg Kell.

B4E Global Summit 2010 Seoul
The B4E Global Summit returned to the Asian continent in 2010, and was held in Seoul, Republic of Korea. With addresses and presentations from Lee Myung-bak, Al Gore, Ban Ki-moon, James Leape and numerous other dignitaries, international attention from the media, policy makers and industry was drawn to the event.

B4E Climate Summit 2010 Cancún
The Climate Summit at Cancún saw a greater and growing partnership between the Summit and international organisations such as WWF and various UN agencies. The outcome statements were favourably viewed upon by industry and non-governmental observers as a feasible avenue for business, government and civil society to gather and discuss business-led targets and solutions for climate change.

B4E Global Summit 2011 Jakarta
Recently concluded in Jakarta, Indonesia, the Global Summit in 2011 took ownership of its location in Jakarta to shift focus to forestry and agriculture, in conjunction with the UN International Year of Forests. A steering committee of business, governmental and civil representatives was formed and gathered first in January to engineer focused discussion panels for the actual Summit in April. The Jakarta Summit included notable speakers such as Susilo Bambang Yudhoyono, Helen Clark and Andrew Steer.

The summit once again featured a recurring Youth Dialogue component to encourage students to engage in local environmental projects, with a separate workshop conducted by National Geographic wildlife presenter Hayden Turner.
