= 1994 Maldivian parliamentary election =

Parliamentary elections were held in the Maldives on 2 December 1994. As there were no political parties at the time, all candidates ran as independents.

== Results ==
Party	Votes	%	Seats
Independents			48
Total			48
Registered voters/turnout	109,072	–	
Source: IPU
