= Criminal Court of the Maldives =

Maldivian court of justice

- ދިވެހިރާއްޖޭގެ ކްރިމިނަލް ކޯޓު
- Established: 2 January 1980
- Jurisdiction: Maldives
- Location: City courthouse, Maafannu, Malé, Maldives
- Authorised by: Judiciary Act Section 53 (b) (2)
- Appeals to: High Court
- Appeals from: None
- Judge term length: Life tenure
- Annual budget: MVR 406K
- Language: Dhivehi
- Website: criminalcourt.gov.mv

Chief Justice of the Maldives
- Currently: Abdul Ghanee Mohamed
- Since: 6 August 2025

The Criminal Court of the Maldives (Dhivehi: ދިވެހިރާއްޖޭގެ ކްރިމިނަލް ކޯޓު, (previously known as the Jinaaee Court) is a Maldivian court of justice of first instance responsible for the practice of Criminal law.

== History ==
Although the date on which the establishment of the court is based is not clear from the court documents, the establishment of this court is based on the date of the establishment of the Mahkamat-e-Sharia. Because during the time when the government was legally run as two separate parts, this court was included as part of the Mahkamat-e-Sharia.

Thus, a separate office called the Mahkamat-e-Sharia was established in 1372 AH to establish justice in Dhvehirajje. After some time, an amendment was brought to the Mahkamat-e-Sharia from the month of Dhul-Hijjah 1372 AH to the month of Muharram 1374 AH He began.

During 1966, the work of the Mahkamat Shariyya was divided into separate tables and a letter was assigned to each table.

On 11 November 1968, the name of the Mahkamat-e-Sharia was changed to the Ministry of Justice. The letters of the Mahkamat-e-Sharia were transferred to the divisions of the Ministry of Justice. In December this year, 08 divisions were created under the Ministry of Justice. These divisions are, Breach of Law and Political Trials Division, Property and Ownership Division, Criminal Trials Division, Debts Division, Marriage Registration Division, Property Claims Division, Theft Trials Division and Mercantile Division.

With the establishment of the Courts of the Ministry of Justice on 02 January 1980, the aforementioned 8 Divisions were abolished and converted into 8 Courts. They are Court No. 1 to No. 8 of the Ministry of Justice. Of these eight courts, criminal cases are heard by Court Nos. 06, 07 and

The 08 courts established on 02 January 1980 were converted to 04 courts in November Of these 04 courts, criminal cases were heard by Court No. 01 and Court No. 3.

Until November 11, 1992, the court was located at the Haa Alif Atoll Store. The courts moved to the Justice Building on November 11, 1992, and the court has been operated in the Justice Building until 27th July 2025 where the president of Maldives Dr. Mohamed Muizzu inaugurated "Justice Building Annex" in Hulhumale' and this court moved to the newly inaugurated building along with Drug court and has been operating there ever since.

On 11 November 1993, the Ministry of Justice was renamed the Ministry of Justice and Islamic Affairs. The Court was known as Court No. 3 of the Ministry of Justice and Islamic Affairs. On 11 November 1996, the name of the Ministry of Justice and Islamic Affairs was changed to the Ministry of Justice.

Court No. 3 of the Ministry of Justice was abolished, and the name of this court was changed to Criminal Court on 01 August

Following the ratification of the Constitution of the Republic of Maldives on August 08, 2008, Article 7 of the Constitution empowered the courts to administer justice. Since this power is vested in the Supreme Court of India, the High Court of Maldives and the lower courts designated by law, the Court operated under the name of "Jinaaee Court" until the passing and ratification of the "Courts of Maldives Act" on 21 October 2010

Article 141(h) of the Constitution of the Republic of Maldives provides that all powers of administration of justice shall be vested in the Supreme Court of Maldives, the High Court of Maldives, and the lower courts designated by law The "Courts of Maldives Bill" was approved by the President on Thursday, October 21, 2010, in accordance with Article 92 of the Constitution.

== Judges of the Court ==
There have been many judges in the past, although, as of 13th August 2026, there are 15 judges including the Chief Judge of the Criminal Court sitting in the court. Here is a list of all the 15 Judges:

- Chief Judge Al-Ustadh Adam Mohamed
- Judge Al-Ustadh Ali Adam
- Judge Al-Ustadh Mohamed Misbah
- Judge Al-Ustadh 'Saf'ath Habeeb
- Judge Al-Ustadh Ali Nadheem
- Judge Al-Ustadh' Ibrahim Ihsaan
- Judge Al-Ustadha Aminath Azleefa
- Judge Al-Ustadh Ibrahim Zihunee
- Judge Al-Ustadha Aishath Nuzuha
- Judge Al-Ustadh Ahmed Niyaz
- Judge Al-Ustadh Ahmed Shafee'u
- Judge Al-Ustadh Muzammil Naasir
- Judge Al-Ustadh Sulaiman Mohamed
- Judge Al-Ustadh Ahmed Thaufeeq
- Judge Al-Ustadh Mohamed Abdullah

== Notable rulings ==
- Former President Abdulla Yameen Abdul Gayoom was sentenced to 11 years in jail for money laundering and bribery charges but was overturned by the High Court.
- The court charged Ahmed "Ahandhu" Ismail in connection with murdering human right activists and news journalists.

== See also ==
- Judiciary of the Maldives
