= Dunya Maumoon =

Maldivian politician (born 1970)

- ދުންޔާ މައުމޫން
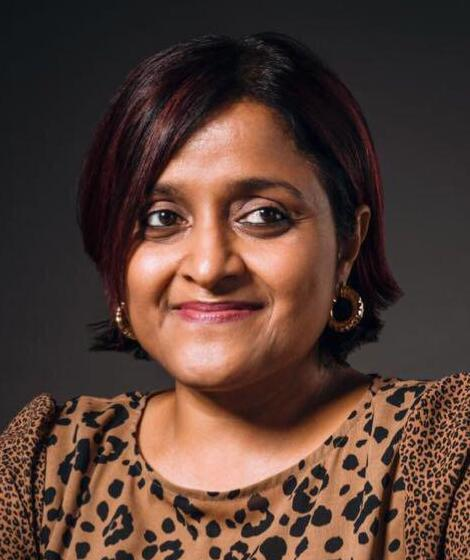
- Maumoon in 2019

Minister of State for Health
- In office 05 January 2017 – 27 February 2018
- President: Abdulla Yameen

Minister of Foreign Affairs
- In office 17 November 2013 – 05 July 2016
- President: Abdulla Yameen
- Preceded by: Mariyam Shakeela (acting)
- Succeeded by: Mohamed Asim

Minister of State for Foreign Affairs
- In office 19 February 2012 – 17 November 2013
- President: Mohamed Waheed Hassan

Personal details
- Born: 20 March 1970 (age 56) Zaria, Nigeria
- Party: Independent (2023–present)
- Other political affiliations: Dhivehi Rayyithunge Party (2005–2011); Progressive Party of Maldives (2011–2019; 2023–2023); Maldives Reform Movement (2019–2021); Maldives National Party (2021–2023)
- Relations: Gayoom family
- Parent(s): Maumoon Abdul Gayoom; Nasreena Ibrahim

Dunya Maumoon (Dhivehi: ދުންޔާ މައުމޫން; born 20 March 1970) is a Maldivian politician who served as the Minister of Foreign Affairs from 2013 to 2016 of the Maldives.

== Personal life ==
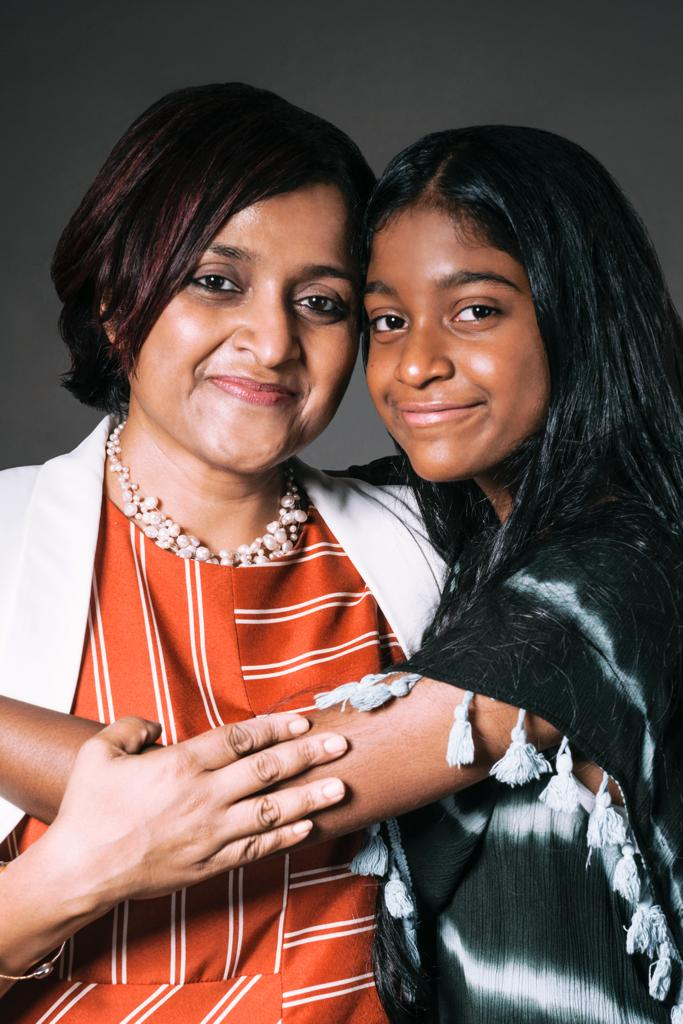
Dunya Maumoon with her daughter Sarraa Shah

Dunya Maumoon was the Minister of Foreign Affairs of Maldives from 2013 to 2016. She is the eldest daughter of former president of Maldives Maumoon Abdul Gayoom and the sister to Ahmed Faris Maumoon

== Political career ==
From 2009 to 2012, Maumoon was involved in both the Dhivehi Rayyithunge Party and later in the Progressive Party of Maldives (PPM) as Council Member and had a role in the Women's Movements.

=== Deputy Minister and Minister of State for Foreign Affairs ===
After her tenure with the UNFPA, in January 2007, Maumoon took up the position of Deputy Minister at the Ministry of Foreign Affairs. Maumoon was appointed Minister of State for Foreign Affairs, by President Dr. Mohamed Waheed Hassan, in February 2012.

=== Minister for Foreign Affairs (Nov 2013 – July 2016) ===
Maumoon served as the Foreign Minister of the Maldives from November 2013 until July 2016. Maumoon was the first female Foreign Minister of the Maldives.

Maumoon played a key role in establishing and re‐energising close ties with traditional friends such as India, Sri Lanka and Pakistan.

Maumoon provided leadership for the Maldivians in its second term serving on the UN's Human Rights Council.

=== State Minister for Health ===
Maumoon later rejoined the government as the Minister of State for Health. Her rejoining her uncle Abdulla Yameen's government was denounced by her father, Maumoon Abdul Gayoom. Maumoon later resigned in 2018 amid the political crisis.

During the 2024 Maldivian parliamentary election, Maumoon ran for the South Hulhumalé constituency.

== Education ==
She obtained a B.A.(Honors) degree in Social Anthropology at the University of Cambridge in England in 1992. She went on to complete a MPhil Degree at the London School of Economic & Political Science (LSE) in 1996, where the focus of her research was.
