= Ahmed Faris Maumoon =

Maldivian politician (born 1971)

- އަޙްމަދު ފާރިސް މައުމޫން
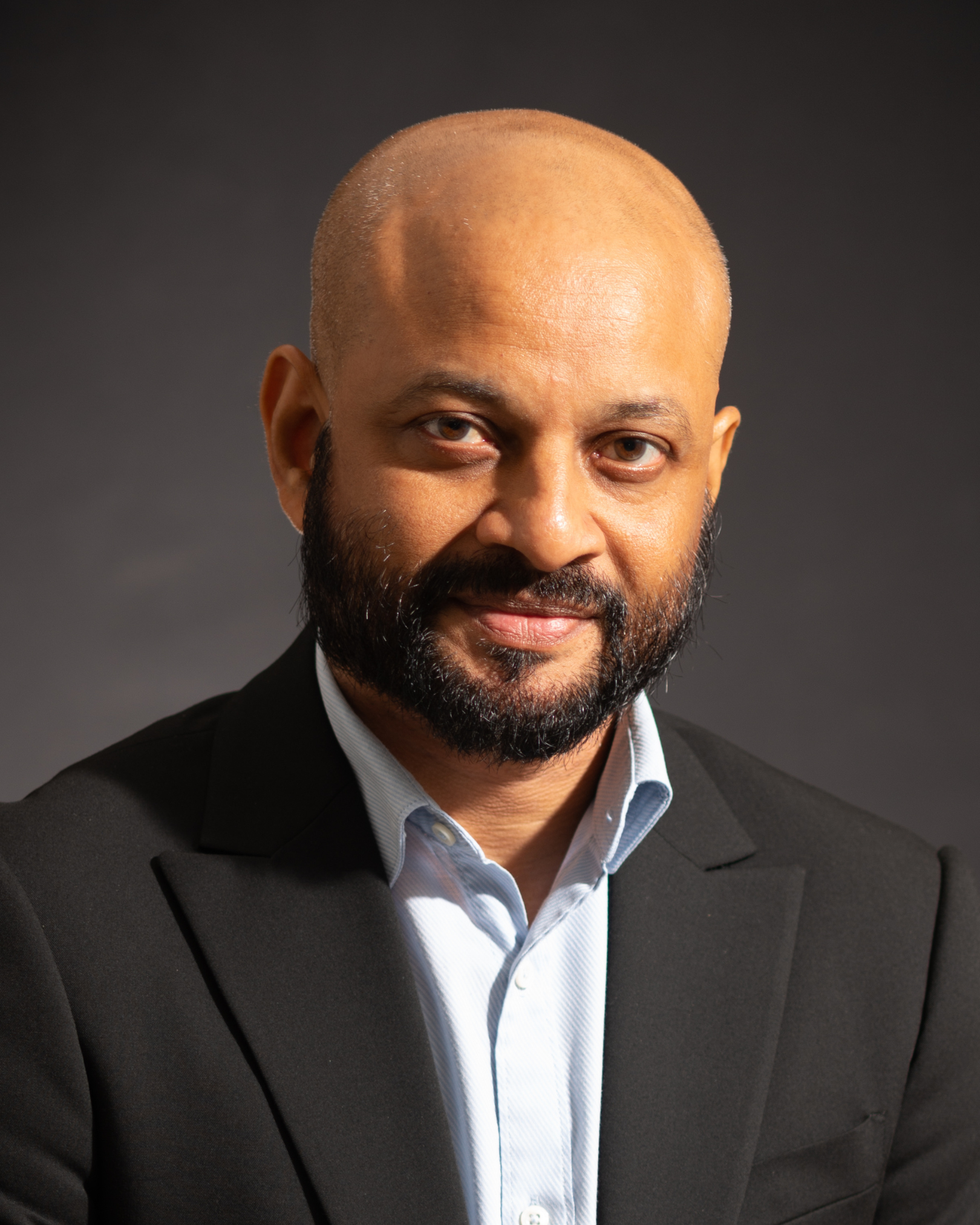
- Faris in 2024

Member of the 18th People's Majlis
- In office 9 June 2015 – 9 May 2019
- President: Abdulla Yameen; Ibrahim Mohamed Solih
- Preceded by: Ahmed Nazim
- Succeeded by: Mohamed Rasheed
- Constituency: Dhiggaru

Minister of State for Economic Development
- In office 25 November 2013 – 9 June 2015
- President: Abdulla Yameen

Personal details
- Born: 31 March 1971 (age 55) Malé, Maldives
- Party: Independent (2025–present)
- Other political affiliations: Dhivehi Rayyithunge Party (2005–2011); Progressive Party of Maldives (2011–2019); Maldives Reform Movement (2019–2023; 2023–2025)
- Relations: Gayoom family
- Children: 1
- Parent(s): Maumoon Abdul Gayoom; Nasreena Ibrahim
- Education: Majeediyya School
- Alma mater: University of Durham; University of New South Wales

Ahmed Faris Maumoon (Dhivehi: އަޙްމަދު ފާރިސް މައުމޫން; born 31 March 1971), commonly known as Faris, is a Maldivian politician who previously served as the President of the Maldives Reform Movement (MRM), a political party established in 2019 by his father and former president, Maumoon Abdul Gayoom. He has served as Minister of State for Economic Development from November 2013 to June 2015. He was also elected as a Member of Parliament (People's Majlis) from June 2015 to May 2019 for Dhiggaru constituency.

== Personal ==
He is one of four siblings, the others being Dunya Maumoon, Yumna Maumoon, and Ghassan Maumoon, Faris was born and raised in Malé, Maldives. He is the son of former president, Maumoon Abdul Gayoom and former first lady, Nasreena Ibrahim.

== Education ==
Following his GCE O Levels from Majeediyya School in Malé, Faris sat for his GCE A levels in England. Since then, he has completed his BA (Hons) in Combined Social Sciences from the University of Durham, England and completed his MA in International Relations from the University of New South Wales in Australia.

== Politics ==
=== Dhivehi Rayyithunge Party (DRP) ===
In 2005, Faris was one of the first 50 signatories requesting the formation of Dhivehi Rayyithunge Party (DRP), which went on to be one of the first few political parties to be registered in Maldives. In 2008, with then President Maumoon Abdul Gayoom running for the presidential elections, Faris stepped in as DRP's campaign manager.

=== Progressive Party of Maldives (PPM) ===
Following disputes about the party's political direction, President Gayoom left DRP to establish the Progressive Party of Maldives (PPM) in October 2011. Faris, also having left DRP, contributed as the founder of PPM and served as chair of the working group in setting up the party, and was elected Interim Council Member and was elected Council Member.

=== Independent ===
Faris ran for President during the 2023 Maldivian presidential election with his running mate, Abdul Sattar. He intended to run as the presidential candidate for the Maldives Reform Movement (MRM), but the Elections Commission (EC) dissolved the party due to not meeting the required number of members. Although the party was later reinstated after a ruling by the Civil Court. He got 2979 votes. Faris also ran for the North Machangoalhi constituency.

== Trial and arrest ==
Faris was one of the many unlawfully detained political opposition members during former President Yameen Abdul Gayoom’s term. He was arrested and detained for six months, without a trial, for alleged bribery of Members of Parliament. This was amidst calls for reform, resignation, and a motion of no-confidence, initiated and led by Faris, against former Speaker of the Parliament, Abdulla Maseeh Mohamed from the joint coalition of opposition parties. Faris led a breakaway segment of 14 MPs from PPM, effectively taking away the government's parliamentary majority.

Held without trial for several months, Faris was also recognized as a Prisoner of Conscience by Amnesty International.

Faris, along with Former President Gayoom, Qasim Ibrahim and Sheikh Imran Abdulla – opposition leaders that were unduly imprisoned before the 2018 Presidential election, were released after the 2018 Presidential Elections was succeeded by the-then President, Ibrahim Mohamed Solih of the Maldivian Democratic Party (MDP).
