= Abbas Ibrahim (politician) =

Maldivian politician (born 1941)

Abbas Ibrahim NIIV
- ޢައްބާސް އިބްރާހީމް
- Portrait, 2026

Member of the People's Majlis
- In office 2009–2000
- Constituency: Noonu Atoll
- In office 1995–2000
- Constituency: Faafu Atoll
- In office 1981–1985
- Constituency: Fuvahmulah

President's Member of the People's Majlis
- In office 1985–1995

Personal details
- Born: 13 August 1941 (age 85)
- Relations: Nasreena Ibrahim (sister)
- Education: Majeediyya School
- Awards: See list

Abbas Ibrahim, NIIV (born 13 August 1941) is a Maldivian politician who served as the member of the People's Majlis from 1981 to 2000, representing different atolls of the country. He also served as the minister of transport and shipping, and minister of fisheries and agriculture during the presidency of Maumoon Abdul Gayoom.

== Early life ==
Abbas Ibrahim was born on 13 August 1941. He studied in Majeediyya School. He has one sister, Nasreena Ibrahim.

== Career ==
Ibrahim joined government service on 18 June 1955 as a clerk at the Ministry of Interior after his graduation from Majeediyya School. In 1959, he started to write articles for the newspaper Malé Times. By the following year, Abbas became an editor for the Fathis newspaper. He had also written for other newspapers such as Moonlight, Cinema, Vaguthu, and Recent Times. He wrote under the name "BBC News Abbas". Following the creation of the Cineco Radio in 1964, he served as an announcer and reporter there. He then became the secretary of the radio until the government took over and was changed to Maldives Islands Broadcasting Service.

After rejoining Radio Maldives on 27 November 1978, he increased news and information programs. Afterwards, he served as Deputy Executive Secretary to the President and Executive Secretary to the President. He then served as the Minister of State for Presidential Affairs, during which he kept an eye on various measures taken by the President's Office. In 1979, Ibrahim launched his own newspaper, Aafathis, in which he conducted various courses to promote journalism.

From 1979 to 1992, he served as the President of the Maafannu Ward's Executive Committee, during which he helped build a preschool in the ward. Ibrahim later served as the Minister of Transport and Shipping and the Minister of Fisheries and Agriculture. He was removed from the latter post after his brother, Ilyas Ibrahim was tried in absentia in 1993.

Ibrahim also served as a member of the People's Majlis and the People's Special Majlis, which he served as the secretary and as the speaker for the latter. He served as the Member of the People's Majlis representing Fuvahmulah from 1981 to 1985, as the President's Member of the Majlis from 1985 to 1995, representing Faafu Atoll from 1995 to 2000, and representing Noonu Atoll from 2000 to 2009.

On 22 December 1996, he was appointed as the president of the National Centre for Linguistic and Historical Research. During his time, he helped digitise the Dhivehi dictionary in 2000, reviewed the Dhivehi translation of the Quran. As of November 2026, he serves as the chair of the Dhivehi Language Academy's Language Rules Committee and as an advisor to the Ministry of Arts, Culture and Heritage, which he was appointed to the latter in 2019. On 11 November 2026, President Mohamed Muizzu appointed Ibrahim to the Advisory Council of National Honourees to consult and advise the President on improving government affairs and regarding various issues facing the nation.

== Awards ==
In 1985, Ibrahim received the Government Award of Encouragement for Information and News. In 1990, he received the Special Award for the 25th anniversary of Maldivian independence. In 2004, he was presented with the National Award of Honour in journalism. Ibrahim was also awarded the "golden pen" of journalism to mark 50 years, and he received the "diamond pen" to mark 75 years of journalism. He also received the Lifetime Achievement Award by the Maldives Media Council. In 2013, Ibrahim was awarded the Order of Izzuddin by President Mohamed Waheed Hassan. In 2026, he received the Highest Honour for Dhivehi Language and Literature by President Mohamed Muizzu.

== Personal life ==
Ibrahim is the brother-in-law of Maumoon Abdul Gayoom. On 1 November 2022, Ibrahim's son, Ziyad Abbas, 53, died.
