= 2018 Maldives political crisis =

- Date: 1 February 2018 – 24 September 2018
- Location: Maldives
- Caused by: Supreme Court order on 1 February to release nine political prisoners and reinstate twelve parliament members; Corruption; Money laundering
- Goals: Resignation of President Abdulla Yameen; To implement the 1 February Supreme Court order
- Methods: Protests; Civil disobedience
- Result: Abdulla Yameen losing the 2018 presidential elections

Parties
Government of the Maldives; Presidency of the Maldives; Progressive Party of Maldives; Maldives Development Alliance; Maldivian People's Party; Maldives Police Service; Maldives National Defence Force	Opposition; Maldivian Democratic Party; Adhaalath Party; Jumhooree Party; Maldives Reform Movement; Supreme Court of the Maldives; Journalists; Amnesty International; European Parliament; United States; India

Lead figures
Abdulla Yameen; Abdulla Maseeh Mohamed; Adam Shareef	Mohamed Nasheed; Ibrahim Mohamed Solih; Maumoon Abdul Gayoom; Qasim Ibrahim; Imran Abdulla

A political crisis in the Maldives intensified on after President Abdulla Yameen decided to disobey the Supreme Court order to release 9 political prisoners and reinstating 12 parliament members which would give the opposition (MDP) control of the chamber and potentially paving the way for Yameen's impeachment.

On 5 February 2018 president Abdulla Yameen declared a state of emergency and ordered the arrest of two judges of the Supreme Court of the Maldives, including Chief Justice of the Maldives Abdulla Saeed and Justice Ali Hameed Mohamed and former President (also his half-brother) Maumoon Abdul Gayoom.

== Events ==
=== February ===
==== 1 February ====
After a few hours after the Supreme Court released the court order on its website. The state-owned TV channel Television Maldives and Channel 13 owned by president Abdulla Yameen went to discredit the order by saying the Supreme Court website was hacked. The Supreme Court immediately responded by tweeting the website is not hacked.

The Supreme Court ordered the release of nine political prisoners: Mohamed Nasheed, Mohamed Nazim, Imran Abdulla, Ahmed Adeeb, Muhthaaz Muhsin, Qasim Ibrahim, Ahmed Faris Maumoon, Ahmed Nihan, and Hamid Ismail. It also ordered the release of twelve MPs: Dhangethi MP Ilham Ahmed, Machangolhi South MP Abdulla Sinan, Dhidhdhoo MP Abdul Latheef Mohamed, Hanimaadhoo MP Hussain Shahudhy, Ihavandhoo MP Mohamed Abdulla, Thinadhoo North MP Saudullah Hilmy, Thinadhoo South MP Abdulla Ahmed, Thimarafushi MP Mohamed Musthafa, Fuvahmulah North MP Ali Shah, Thulusdhoo MP Mohamed Waheed, Villingili MP Saud Hussain, and Maduvvari MP Mohamed Ameeth.

Maldivian Democratic Party was already holding a small peaceful gathering in front of their campaign headquarters who heard the news and many broke into tears including some members of the People's Majlis. They announced a gathering to be held on 2 February 2018, that night at 2:00 a.m.

Cabinet ministers question authenticity of the court order and said that they have not been able to be in contact with the Supreme Court and they are trying to get direct communication with the justices.

President Abdulla Yameen fired the Commissioner of Police Ahmed Areef and replaced by Ahmed Saudhee, claiming that Areef was not attending his phone calls. Ahmed Saudhee also fired back by saying that he was trying to follow the court orders and president Yameen did not allow him to do his job.

The opposition held a peaceful rally. Maldives Police Service an hour after the rally started used tear gas and pepper spray to disperse the crowd and leaving many affected.

==== 3 February ====
The opening of People's Majlis was cancelled for security reasons and was being rescheduled as soon as it was possible.

President Abdulla Yameen fires Acting-Commissioner of Police Ahmed Saudhee, and gave no clear reason why he fired Saudhee. President's Office's staff released a small statement only saying:

"By the power bestowed upon the President under Article 54 (b) of the Police Act (Act No: 5/2008), President Abdulla Yameen Abdul Gayoom has today dismissed Ahmed Saudhee from the post of Deputy Commissioner of Police,"

President Abdulla Yameen hold a rally and officially announce his re-election and say he was not expecting the Supreme Court ruling, the state and all relevant authorities have to do a lot of work to see how to implement it.

Special Operations Police were posted outside the Chief Justice, Abdulla Saeed's house. Upon hearing rumours he was about to be arrested the public gathered and had clashes with Special Operations Police the people who gathered were backed off successfully and Special Operations Police Maldives Police Service released the statement they were not going to be arresting Justice Abdulla Saeed.

==== 4 February ====
Attorney General alongside acting-police commissioner Abdulla Nawaz and Chief of Defence Force Ahmed Shiyam holds press conference saying they will not obey any order to impeach President Abdulla Yameen.

Secretary General of the Parliament Ahmed Mohamed resigns citing "personal reasons."

Opposition lawmakers submit no-confidence motion against Prosecutor General, Aishath Bisham, Attorney General, Mohamed Anil, Home Minister, Azleen Ahmed, and Defence Minister, Adam Shareef for their refusal to comply with the Supreme Court order.

==== 5 February ====
Criminal Court orders the immediate release of Faris Maumoon from detention.

President Abdulla Yameen declares a state of emergency for 15 days, suspension of 20 constitutional rights, and the Criminal Procedures Act and parts of the Judges Act.

Maldivian military forces gather around the Supreme Court and try to break into the court by forcing the gate open.

Former president Maumoon Abdul Gayoom and his son-in-law Mohamed Nadheem got arrested on charges of trying to overthrow the government.

==== 6 February ====
After multiple attempts to break into the Supreme Court special operations climbed up the roof of the High Court (same building) and broke the windows of the Supreme Court and forced Justice Ali Hameed and dragged Chief Justice Abdulla Saeed on the floor out of the Supreme Court.

Former president Mohamed Nasheed requests India's intervention.

State of emergency amended to suspend more legal rights, including the right to remain silent and be brought before a judge within 24 hours.

Ibrahim Siyad Qasim, son of opposition leader Qasim Ibrahim arrested.

==== 7 February ====
Judge Ali Hameed was admitted to Indira Gandhi Memorial Hospital. President Yameen said that the Supreme Court was at the centre of a "judicial coup" and that the only way to investigate it is by declaring a state of emergency.

==== 8 February ====
The Maldivian government issued a statement saying that the Supreme Court order 2018/SC-SJ/01 was legally problematic as well as inviting all the political parties in the country to resume All-Party talks to help resolve the crisis.

The United Nations High Commissioner for Human Rights Zeid Ra’ad al-Hussein condemned the state of emergency as an ‘all-out assault on democracy’.

==== 9 February ====
Raajje TV—a popular opposition television—was forced to suspend its broadcast fearing crackdown following a warning from the Ministry of Defence and National Security and the withdrawal of security provided by Maldives Police Service.

The United Nations Security Council met behind closed doors where a UN official warned that the situation in the Maldives may deteriorate further.

==== 10 February ====
Youth protestors took to the streets calling for the implementation of the 1 February Supreme Court ruling. They were later arrested and detained, among those arrested were part of the Maldivian Democratic Party (MDP)'s youth wing.

==== 12 February ====
Maldives police launches a probe into a "coup attempt" after alleged bribes were exchanged to overthrow President Abdulla Yameen.

==== 15 February ====
The International Federation of Journalists, Reporters Without Borders, and the Committee to Protect Journalists raised concerns about press freedom in the Maldives and called on the authorities to allow the media to do their work without any fear of reprisal.

Four members of the MDP National Council were arrested on suspicion they were planning to be involved in a mass rally.

==== 16 February ====
Protests were held in Malé, Addu City, and in several islands, calling on the government to implement the 1 February Supreme Court ruling. Police had used pepper spray and tear gas on protesters, journalists, and members of the People's Majlis gathered there.

==== 17 February ====
According to a senior diplomat, the Maldives sought international help to investigate Chief Justice Abdulla Saeed and Ali Hameed.

==== 18 February ====
President Abdulla Yameen submitted a request to the People's Majlis for an extension of the state of emergency by thirty days. He submitted it on the basis that the crisis hasn't been resolved and that the National Security Council advised a continued state of emergency.

==== 20 February ====
Ahmed Zalif, the lawyer representing Ilham Ahmed, was arbitrarily arrested and detained and was accused of "obstruction of justice and enforcement of the law for not revealing the whereabouts of his clients’ mobile phone".

The Supreme Court later back pedalled and resuspended the twelve MPs before the voting of the extension of the state of emergency.

The Majlis approved the extension of the state of emergency with 38 votes despite 41 in attendance. The opposition boycotted the vote to ensure that the extension wouldn't happen although it did. It was deemed "unconstitutional" by the Prosecutor General Aishath Bisam, since it was forced through parliament without a quorum.

==== 21 February ====
The Maldives United Opposition said in a statement that the emergency decree passed by the Majlis is illegal and that the Majlis speaker Abdulla Maseeh Mohamed bypassed the constitution to pass it. The Supreme Court issued a temporary order which ordered the parliament and relevant authorities to act upon the parliamentary approval of the state of emergency including its amendments.

=== March ===
==== 3 March ====
Maldives police arrested seventeen protesters including three MDP MPs. Mohamed Nasheed and MDP both called for the detainees to be released.

==== 14 March ====
Protesters gathered on Majeedhee Magu—the main road of Malé—which blocked all transport and attacked a police officer using crude oil. The police seized 105 packets of chilli water from the protest.

==== 15 March ====
Police arrested three MPs—Mariya Ahmed Didi, Mohamed Ameeth and Ali Hussain—along with ten other protesters which included former environment minister Mohamed Aslam as part of "illegal demonstrations and violent riots" to overthrow the government. Police had also confiscated 76 packets of pepper water and 24 iron rods from the protest site and believed it was to be used against police officers handling the crowd.

==== 16–17 March ====
The government condemned the attacks on police officers on the previous two days.

Thousands of protesters gathered on the streets of Malé and held their rally until early morning on 17 March. The police and the army had used pepper spray and tear gas on the protesters. Police had also arrested 140+ protesters.

Raajje TV reporter Mohamed Wisam and programme head Amir Saleem were arrested and accused of "making a video showing masked men in police uniforms threatening to join anti-government demonstration" and were remanded for ten days. Mohamed Fazeen, another Raajje TV journalist, was arrested for "defying police orders" and was arrested the following day.

==== 20 March ====
The Prosecutor General's Office (PGO) brought politically motivated charges against judges, former police commissioners, lawmakers, and former president Maumoon Abdul Gayoom under the Anti-Terrorism Act, along with accepting bribes and obstructing justice.

==== 22 March ====
President Abdulla Yameen lifted the state of emergency.

==== 23 March ====
During an opposition protest, police pepper sprayed a man in close proximity, which led to him being unconscious and in a coma at Indira Gandhi Memorial Hospital.

==== 24 March ====
Friends and family of murdered blogger Yameen Rasheed held a march and was blocked by police officers while Special Ops officers tried to disperse the crowd.

== Response ==
Former President Mohamed Nasheed, in exile in the UK, called for India to send a military-backed diplomatic mission to compel the release of political detainees, and for the US and UK to freeze the financial transaction of Maldivian government officials. The Indian government stated that they regard the situation as "disturbing". The Times of India reported that the Indian Armed Forces were on standby for "deployment at short notice" on potential operations in Maldives, ranging from the evacuation of nationals to a military intervention akin to that in the 1988 Operation Cactus.

South Asian Speakers and Parliamentarians called on Majlis speaker Abdulla Maseeh Mohamed to ensure the rule of law. The UN Human Rights Commissioner had also called the crisis an "an all-out assault on democracy".

The Chairman of the Association of SAARC Speakers and Parliamentarians had also appealed to the Majlis speaker Abdulla Maseeh Mohamed to find peaceful resolutions through dialogue. Amnesty International called on the government to halt crackdowns on freedom of expression and to hold those accountable.

China expression opposition to any UN intervention in the Maldives and has said that "current situation and dispute in the Maldives are its internal affairs".

The Indian Ministry of External Affairs said in a statement that they are "deeply dismayed" that the Maldivian government extended the state of emergency by another thirty days. In response, the Maldivian government said that the Indian government's statement is a distortion of facts. The United States Department of State along with the International Democracy Union called for the state of emergency to end and to follow the 1 February Supreme Court order.

The Foreign Affairs Council of the European Union called for the lifting of the state of emergency, restoration of constitutionally guaranteed rights, release of political prisoners, and an end of interference with the Supreme Court.

The International Federation for Human Rights and the Maldivian Democracy Network called for the government to end mass arrests of protesters following the 16–17 March arrests.

The European Parliament passed a resolution to urge the government to lift the state of emergency, release all persons arbitrarily detained and ensure the proper functioning of Parliament and judiciary. They also called upon the government of China and India to work with countries within the EU to help restore democracy in the country.

The Inter-Parliamentary Union had raised concerns over the wave of arrests of parliament members and terrorism charges being brought against them. The Parliamentarians for Global Action condemned the Maldives for its repeated violations of human rights against parliamentarians.

== See also ==
- 2011–2013 Maldives political crisis
- 2003 Maldives civil unrest
