= Ilyas Ibrahim =

Maldivian parliamentarian (born 1945)

Ilyas Ibrahim NIIV
- އިލްޔާސް އިބްރާހިމް

Member of the Special Majlis
- In office 2003–2008
- Constituency: Laamu Atoll

Member of the People's Majlis
- In office 1980–1995
- Constituency: Malé

Personal details
- Born: 9 September 1945 (age 80) Malé, Maldives
- Other political affiliations: Dhivehi Rayyithunge Party
- Relations: Nasreena Ibrahim (sister); Maumoon Abdul Gayoom (brother-in-law)

Ilyas Ibrahim, NIIV (Dhivehi: އިލްޔާސް އިބްރާހިމް) (born December 18, 1945) is the brother-in-law of the former President of the Maldives Maumoon Abdul Gayyoom. He was a minister in Maumoon's cabinet for a long time and served as an MP for the capital city Malé from 1980 to 1995. He also served as the MP for Laamu Atoll, & a member of People's Special Majilis, from 2003 to 2008.

He was also the Minister of State for Defence, Minister of Home Affairs of Maldives and the head of State Trading Organization (STO) & Airports Company of the Maldives. The Maldives Airports Company was later dissolved due to bankruptcy and Maldivian was commissioned.

== Background ==
His sister Nasreena Ibrahim was the First Lady of the Maldives from 1978 to 2008. His brother Abbas Ibrahim was the speaker of the People's Majlis.

== Presidential bid ==
In 1993 when Ilyas Ibrahim became Gayoom's only principal rival for the 1993 presidential election, he was subsequently tried in absentia for violation of the constitution, found guilty of treason and sentenced to more than 15 years banishment.

Many high-ranking officials of the Government were retired or sacked, including the regional Governors (Atoll Chiefs) who were close to him. The most prominent among was the Suvadive Islands Governor and Atoll Chief Hon. Mohamed Waheed, who was retired as a State Dignitary by the President Maumoon Abdul Gayoom. Except for Governor Mohamed Waheed, remaining Governors were incarcerated. He later returned and resumed his portfolio as a Minister as the Health Minister of Maldives.
