= Maldives political crisis =

Maldives political crisis may refer to:

- 2011–12 Maldives political crisis
- 2018 Maldives political crisis
