= Yumna Maumoon =

Maldivian politician (born 1970)

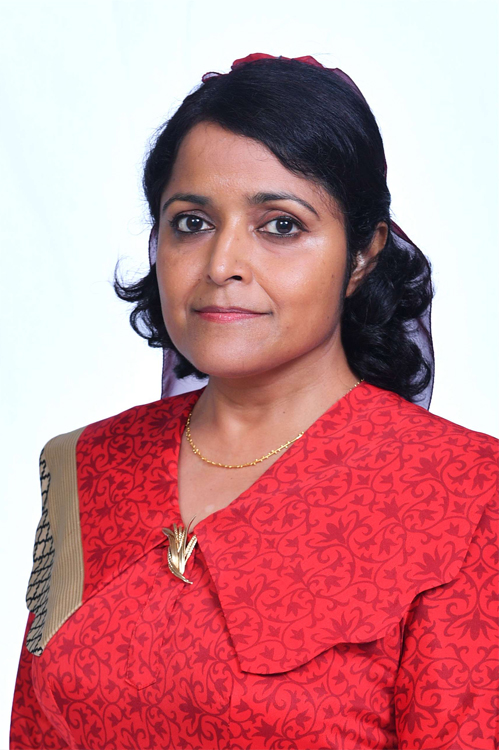
- Official portrait, 2018

Minister of Arts, Culture, and Heritage
- In office 17 November 2018 – 17 November 2023
- President: Ibrahim Mohamed Solih
- Succeeded by: Adam Naseer Ibrahim

Personal details
- Born: 20 March 1970 (age 56) Zaria, Nigeria
- Party: Maldives Reform Movement
- Spouse: Mohamed Nadheem
- Relations: Gayoom family
- Parent(s): Maumoon Abdul Gayoom; Nasreena Ibrahim
- Education: Bachelor of Arts; Master of Arts

Yumna Maumoon (born 20 March 1970) is a Maldivian politician who served as Minister of Arts, Culture, and Heritage from 17 November 2018 to 17 November 2023 under the administration of Ibrahim Mohamed Solih.

Yumna is the younger daughter of president Maumoon Abdul Gayoom, who served as the president of the Maldives from 1978 to 2008. She also served as assistant director at National Centre for Linguistic and Historical Research.

== Personal life ==
Yumna Maumoon was born on 20 March 1970 as the younger twin–sister of Dunya Maumoon and daughter of Maumoon Abdul Gayoom and Nasreena Ibrahim.

She is married to Mohamed Nadheem.
