= Maldives Reform Movement =

Political party in the Maldives from 2019 to 2025

Maldives Reform Movement މޯލްޑިވްސް ރިފޯމް މޫވްމެންޓް
- Abbreviation: MRM
- President: Ahmed Faris Maumoon
- Spokesperson: Ismail Naail Nasheed
- Deputies: Aiminath Nadira, Shazail Shiyam
- Founder: Yumna Maumoon & Maumoon Abdul Gayoom
- Founded: 20 November 2019
- Dissolved: 29 January 2025
- Split from: Progressive Party of Maldives
- Headquarters: 2nd Floor, 2A, Maaraadha Aage, Dhanburuh Magu (Abaage Magu) Machchangolhi, Male', Maldives
- Membership: 2,231
- Ideology: Political Islam; Social conservatism Nationalism; Presidentialism
- Political position: Right-wing
- Religion: Sunni Islam
- Colors: Gold; Green

Website
- www.mrm.mv
- Politics of Maldives; Political parties; Elections; Membership updated as of 19 September 2024

The Maldives Reform Movement (Dhivehi: މޯލްޑިވްސް ރިފޯމް މޫވްމެންޓް) was a political party in the Maldives officially founded on 20 November 2019. The Elections Commission (EC) authorized the formation on 2 October 2019. The party was registered by Yumna Maumoon but was founded by former president Maumoon Abdul Gayoom after disagreements with Abdulla Yameen about the direction of the Progressive Party of Maldives. It was dissolved on 29 January 2025.

== History ==
MRM was the political party established by Maumoon Abdul Gayoom, who as of the party's founding was Asia's longest-serving president by time in office. He established the Dhivehi Rayyithunge Party (DRP) in 2005 after giving his consent legalizing political parties in Maldives. His disputes with the party leader at the time, Ahmed Thasmeen Ali, led to him leaving and establishing the Progressive Party of Maldives (PPM) in October 2011. Nonetheless, Maumoon left the PPM in 2017 over a dispute over its leadership with his estranged half-brother, former president Abdulla Yameen.

The function to form the party was held on 7 November 2019 where the former president, Maumoon was appointed as the President of the party. Maldives Reform Movement (MRM) has received the official certificate of registration with the Elections Commission on 20 November 2019.

On 2 October 2021, MRM held its congress and former MP Ahmed Faris Maumoon was elected as its president while Aiminath Nadira and Shazail Shiyam was elected as the deputies.

On 24 May 2023, the Election Commission issued a decision to dissolve the MRM, as the party failed to maintain a minimum of 3,000 members as mandated by law. It was later found out that the Election Commission didn't count some membership forms that were not processed at that time and the Supreme Court revoked the dissolvement letter.

In 2024, the EC decided to dissolve the MRM after once again failing to reach a minimum of 3000 members. On 16 October 2024, it resumed efforts on dissolving the MRM.

On 29 January 2025, the EC officially dissolved the party.
