= Society for Health Education =

Non-governmental organization in the Maldives

- ސޮސަޔަޓީ ފޮރ ހެލްތް އެޑިއުކޭޝަން
- Abbreviation: SHE
- Formation: 1988
- Founder: Nasreena Ibrahim; Dr. Naila Firdous; Naila Ibrahim Kaleyfaanu; Nasheeda Ahmed Riza
- Headquarters: M. Kulunu Vehi, Buruzu Magu
- Location: Malé, Maldives
- Region served: Maldives
- Members: 3
- Chairperson: Ibrahim Firushan
- Website: https://www.she.org.mv/

The Society for Health Education (Dhivehi: ސޮސަޔަޓީ ފޮރ ހެލްތް އެޑިއުކޭޝަން, abbreviation: SHE) is a non-governmental organization (NGO) based in the Republic of Maldives. It focuses on addressing issues like Thalassemia, Counselling and Psychological Support, Sexual and Reproductive Health, and Health Education.

== Ethos ==
The vision of SHE is;

An organization that is proactive in identifying and addressing crucial health and social concerns of the Maldives.

The mandate of SHE is;

- Strive to improve the quality of life of the Maldivian people.
- Harness the expertise of national professionals, on a voluntary basis for development programmes.
- Endeavour to raise awareness of health and social issues.

== Programs ==
SHE offers 3 programs:

- Thalassemia Laboratory & Diagnostic Services
- Counselling & Psychosocial Services
- Sexual and Reproductive Health Services

== Structure ==
Governance of SHE is implemented at the board level and led by the executive board. The Executive Committee Board consists of the Chairperson, VIce Chairperson, General Secretary, Treasurer, Youth Members and General Members. They are elected by the general members for a term of 3 years during the Annual General Meeting.

== Membership ==
SHE is a fully fledged member of the International Planned Parenthood Federation (IPPF), the Thalassemia International Federation, & The Asian-Pacific Resource & Research Centre for Women (ARROW). SHE is also supported by the United Nations Population Fund (UNFP).
