= Israel–Maldives relations =

- Israel: Maldives

Israel and the Maldives maintained diplomatic relations from 1965 to 1974. From 2012 to 2017, they maintained cooperation agreements, but did not restore full diplomatic relations.

In 2025, the Maldivian government banned Israeli passport holders from entering the country, in response to the Gaza war.

== History ==
The Maldives established diplomatic relations with Israel in 1965, when Israel was the third state to recognize Maldives, and the Israeli ambassador was the first to present his credentials to the President of the Maldives. The Maldives suspended them in 1974.

In 2009, under president Mohamed Nasheed, the Maldives signed cooperation agreements with Israel on tourism, health, education, and culture. In 2010, the Israeli government sent a team of eye doctors to treat patients and train local medical personnel in the Maldives.

In May 2011, the Maldives’s then-foreign minister, Ahmed Naseem, became the first top official from the Maldives to visit Israel, which he did on a four-day trip. However, the renewed relationship did not develop into full diplomatic relations.

In July 2018, under president Abdulla Yameen, the Maldives terminated the cooperation agreements with Israel and in 2014 announced a boycott of Israeli products, as Israel launched a military operation in Gaza. The then-Foreign Minister Dunya Maumoon also announced that the Maldives would fully support Palestinians at international forums such as the United Nations Human Rights Council and offer them humanitarian aid.

In 2020, after UAE and Bahrain recognized Israel and a local media outlet reported the government had discussed establishing ties with Israel, the then-Maldivian foreign minister, Abdulla Shahid, denied having initiated discussions regarding establishing ties with Israel.

In 2021, Israeli travel company Caminos announced it would offer direct flights from the Maldives to Israel from 6 September to 4 October 2021. The Maldives are popular among Israeli tourists. However, the rumors of offering direct flights were denied by the Maldivian transport ministry.

=== Gaza war ===
In October 2023, following the start of the Gaza war, Maldivians began holding protests to stop Israeli tourism in the Maldives. Maldivian MP Saud Hussain submitted a resolution to parliament to ban Israeli passport holders from coming to the country. In the same year, the Israeli Foreign Affairs Ministry issued a travel warning for the Maldives due to the "anti-Israel" atmosphere, while Maldivians concurrently for a boycott of companies associated with Israel.

The Maldives condemned Israel's Israeli offensive attacks on Rafah in May 2024, and called on Israel to abide by the International Court of Justice's ruling to halt the offensive.

In 2024, Maldivian MP Meekail Ahmed Naseem submitted a bill to the parliament calling for a ban on entry for Israeli passport holders. It was promptly accepted and was sent to the Security Services Committee (241 Committee). After months of being stalled in the committee, on 14 April 2025, the ban was approved with some modifications. The ban came into immediate effect after it was approved by parliament the following day.

== See also ==
- Foreign relations of Israel
- Foreign relations of the Maldives
- International recognition of Israel
