= Maumoon Abdul Gayoom =

President of the Maldives from 1978 to 2008

Maumoon Abdul Gayoom NGIV GCMG GOM
- މައުމޫން ޢަބްދުލް ޤައްޔޫމް
- Formal portrait, 2008

3rd President of the Maldives
- In office 11 November 1978 – 11 November 2008
- Vice President: None
- Preceded by: Ibrahim Nasir
- Succeeded by: Mohamed Nasheed

Minister of Finance and Treasury
- In office 5 January 1989 – 1 September 2004 (Note: The ministry was previously known as the Ministry of Finance from 5 January 1989 to 11 November 1993.)
- President: Himself
- Preceded by: Mohamed Nooraddin
- Succeeded by: Ismail Fathhy

Governor of the Maldives Monetary Authority
- In office 1 July 1981 – 31 August 2004
- President: Himself
- Preceded by: office established
- Succeeded by: Mohamed Jaleel

Minister of Defence and National Security
- In office 11 November 1978 – 11 November 1993 (Note: The ministry was previously known as the Ministry of Public Safety from 11 November 1978 to 11 November 1982. As Gayoom assumed the role of Minister of Defence since 1978, Ilyas Ibrahim played a significant role in overseeing the Ministry of Defence, serving as Deputy Minister of Defence and Deputy Chief of Defence Force from 22 February to 30 May 1990.)
- President: Himself
- Deputy: Ilyas Ibrahim
- Preceded by: Abdul Hannan Haleem
- Succeeded by: Abdul Sattar Adam

Minister of Transport
- In office 29 March 1977 – 11 November 1978
- President: Ibrahim Nasir
- Preceded by: Hassan Zareer
- Succeeded by: Hassan Zareer

Permanent Representative of the Maldives to the United Nations
- In office 24 September 1976 – 28 March 1977
- President: Ibrahim Nasir
- Preceded by: Abdul Sattar Moosa Didi
- Succeeded by: Fathulla Jameel

Personal details
- Born: Abdulla Maumoon Khairi; 29 December 1937 (age 88) Malé, Maldive Islands
- Party: Independent (1978–2005, 2017–2019, 2025–present)
- Other political affiliations: Rayyithunge (2005–2011); Progressive (2011–2017); Reform (2019–2025)
- Spouse: Nasreena Ibrahim (m. 1969)
- Relations: Gayoom family
- Children: Dunya; Yumna; Faris; Ghassan
- Parent: Abdul Gayoom Ibrahim (father)
- Education: Al-Azhar University; American University in Cairo
- Maumoon Abdul Gayoom's voice Gayoom speaks on the 58th World Health Assembly; Recorded 16 May 2005

Maumoon Abdul Gayoom (/ɡaɪˈjuːm/ gah-YOOM; born Abdulla Maumoon Khairi; 29 December 1937) is a Maldivian politician, statesman and diplomat who served as the 3rd president of the Maldives from 1978 to 2008. He previously served as the Minister of Transport from 1977 to 1978, and as the Permanent Representative of the Maldives to the United Nations from 1976 to 1977. Gayoom is the longest-serving president in Maldivian history.

Gayoom was born and raised in Malé. After serving as a lecturer at the Ahmadu Bello University in Nigeria, he returned to the Maldives in 1971 and worked as a teacher at Aminiya School. He was later appointed the manager of the government shipping department. Gayoom was placed under house arrest in 1973 for criticising the policies of the then-president Nasir. He was later banished to Makunudhoo for four years but was released five months later as part of an amnesty following President Nasir's re-election for a second term. In 1974, he was arrested again for his continued criticism of Nasir's policies, but after 50 days in jail, he was freed and, in 1975 appointed as Special Undersecretary in the Prime Minister's Office. Gayoom later served as the deputy ambassador of the Maldives to Sri Lanka and was appointed deputy minister of transport under minister Hassan Zareer. After serving as deputy minister, he was appointed Permanent Representative of the Maldives to the United Nations in 1976. Following a vacancy at the ministery of transport, Gayoom was appointed to the position. As president Nasir chose not to seek re-election, a vote in the Citizen's Majlis selected Gayoom as the candidate. In July 1978, Gayoom won the presidential referendum with 92.96% of the vote.

During his administration, economic policies prioritised infrastructure development and tourism, which significantly boosted the nation's economic growth. He introduced educational reforms that expanded access to primary and secondary education and improved healthcare by establishing new health facilities. In response to political unrest and calls for greater democracy, Gayoom initiated constitutional reforms, transitioning from a presidential to a semi-presidential system, intending to increase political participation and transparency. However, his presidency faced criticism for restricting political freedoms and suppressing opposition. The 1988 coup attempt prompted a focus on strengthening the armed forces. The 2004 tsunami had a profound impact on his administration, leading to the loss of 62% of GDP and nearly two decades of development, which reshaped his policies and necessitated extensive reconstruction efforts. Despite challenges, Gayoom's long tenure, strict policies, and human rights violations, earned him a reputation as a dictator.

Following his defeat in the 2008 presidential election to Mohamed Nasheed, which marked the Maldives's first multi-party elections, Gayoom adopted a low public profile. In 2018, Gayoom was arrested on charges of conspiring to overthrow the government as a part of the 2018 political crisis, and was sentenced to 19 months in prison for obstructing justice after refusing to cooperate with the police and judiciary. He was placed under house arrest in September 2018 due to health concerns and was released on bail later that month. He was acquitted of all charges in October 2018.

== Early life ==
Maumoon Abdul Gayoom was born Abdulla Maumoon Khairi on 29 December 1937, at his father's home in Machangoalhi, Malé. He was the first child of Abdul Gayoom Ibrahim and Khadheeja Moosa and the tenth child of Abdul Gayoom. His father was a lawyer and the 7th Attorney General of the Maldives from 1950 to 1951. Gayoom is a descendant of the Hilaalee and Dhiyamigili dynasties, with Arab and African ancestry.

Gayoom spent his early years under the care of his parents at Kaamineege, their family residence. His birth name was Abdulla Maumoon Khairi, he was familiarly known as Lhaseedi at home, while in school, he was called Abdulla Maumoon. His name was changed to Maumoon Abdul Gayoom due to a clerical mistake during the issuance of his passport for overseas education in 1947. When completing the passport form, an assistant mistakenly combined his commonly used name, "Maumoon", with his father's name, resulting in the name Maumoon Abdul Gayoom.

=== Education ===
Gayoom received his early education through homeschooling, taught by his father, a teacher and scholar. He later attended the then-Saniyya School, studying religion, the Dhivehi language, mathematics, and Maldivian history. In 1947, he received a government scholarship to study abroad. He traveled to Ceylon intending to continue to Egypt but stayed due to the outbreak of the 1948 Arab–Israeli war. While in Colombo, he continued homeschooling with a private tutor who taught him English.

Gayoom then attended Al Bahjathul Ibraheemiyyah Arabic College in Galle, and later transferred to Royal College, Colombo. After two years in Ceylon, he traveled in March 1950 to Cairo, Kingdom of Egypt, where he studied at Al-Azhar University. He spent six months learning Arabic in the university and later earned bachelor's and master's degrees in Islamic Sharia and Law. He also obtained a Master's of Arts in Shariah and Law and later began preparing a thesis for a PhD in Sharia and Law. However, his plans were interrupted when the Egyptian government ceased financial aid to Maldivian students after the Maldives established diplomatic relations with Israel. Gayoom protested by sending a letter to prime minister Ibrahim Nasir—an act that led to blacklisting and a ban on entering to the Maldives. The ban was later lifted. During the 1956 Suez Crisis, Gayoom was volunteered to defend Palestine during the Israeli attack on Egypt. He graduated from the Al-Azhar University in 1966.

Gayoom also attended the American University in Cairo, where he furthered his studies in Islamic Sharia and Law and later obtained a secondary-level certificate in English.

=== Marriage and children ===
In 1965, the 27-year old Gayoom met 15-year old Nasreena Ibrahim in Cairo while she was there to study. Four years later, on 20 July 1969, the couple married in Cairo, before moving to Nigeria for Gayoom to work at Ahmadu Bello University.

A year after their marriage, Maumoon Abdul Gayoom and Nasreena welcomed their first children, twin daughters Dunya and Yumna, on 20 March 1970. Their first son, Ahmed Faris, was born in Malé on 31 March 1971, followed by their second son, Mohamed Ghassan, who was born on 12 June 1980 during Gayoom's presidential administration.

== Early career ==
=== Career ===
From 1969 to 1971, Gayoom was a lecturer in Islamic studies at Abdullahi Bayero College, then part of Ahmadu Bello University in Kano State, Nigeria. After serving at the Ahmadu Bello University, Gayoom returned to the Maldives in early 1971. From 1971 to 1972, he taught English, arithmetic, and Islam at Aminiya School in Malé, where he gained popularity among parents. In 1972, he was transferred to the government shipping department, where he served as manager.

In 1974, Gayoom was appointed undersecretary and later became director of the government telecommunications department. Later that year, he was appointed special undersecretary in the office of prime minister Ahmed Zaki. The position ended in March 1975 when Zaki was removed from office, and the prime minister's role was abolished. Gayoom then spent time in Colombo before returning to the Maldives, where he was appointed deputy ambassador to Sri Lanka. In 1975, he became undersecretary at the Department of External Affairs.

In 1976, Gayoom was appointed deputy minister of transport and, on 24 September, became the Permanent Representative of the Maldives to the United Nations. He returned to the Maldives in March 1977 and served as minister of transport until November 1978.

==== Minister of Transport (1977–1978) ====
Soon after returning from the United States after serving at the United Nations, Gayoom accepted President Nasir's request to serve as Minister of transport. At the time, the position was vacant; Nasir appointed Gayoom as the minister of transport in March 1977. During his tenure, Gayoom focused on improving the country's transportation infrastructure.

During his tenure as minister, Gayoom oversaw developments in transportation and aviation in the Maldives. He encouraged the use of engine-powered boats, which were not widely popular among the population at the time. He also contributed to the improvement of Hulhulé Airport by upgrading its systems. Gayoom worked on expanding the aviation sector by increasing flights between the Maldives and international destinations, supporting the growth of the tourism industry and improving travel options for Maldivians. His tenure ended upon his inauguration as president of the Maldives in November 1978.

=== Imprisonments ===
During the early 1970s, efforts were underway to expand the tourism industry in the Maldives, led by President Ibrahim Nasir. Tensions between Gayoom and the authorities — arising from earlier disputes during his time in Egypt — continued to grow. His remarks on alcohol and drugs drew widespread attention and sparked discussions across Malé. The government investigated the matter, placing him under house arrest on 12 March 1973. After a trial, Gayoom was sentenced to four years of banishment on 14 May 1973 and transferred to Makunudhoo Island in Haa Dhaalu Atoll on 21 May. He was released on 13 October 1973 under an amnesty following Nasir's re-election, having served five months.

On 28 July 1974, Gayoom was arrested again for continuing to criticise government policies and held in solitary confinement in a Malé prison. After 50 days, he was released in September 1974 and ceased further public criticism.

== Presidential elections ==
=== 1978 presidential election ===
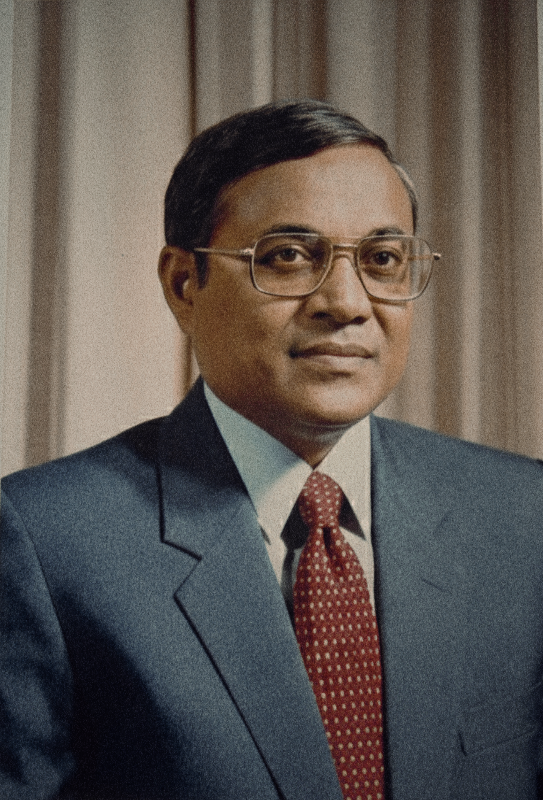
Portrait, 1985

Gayoom was nominated for the presidential election in 1978 by his two brothers-in-law, who proposed his name to parliament. Both then-President Ibrahim Nasir and Gayoom were put forward as candidates to be selected as the sole presidential candidate, with Nasir receiving 41 votes and Gayoom securing 5 votes. However, Nasir decided not to seek a third term due to health concerns. The Citizen's Majlis nominated three candidates for the presidency: the Minister of Education and former Vice President Abdul Sattar Moosa Didi, the Minister of Health Moomina Haleem, and the Minister of Transport, Gayoom. In July 1978, the Majlis selected Gayoom as the sole candidate for the election—as required by the constitution.

During his campaign, Gayoom pledged to visit every inhabited island in the Maldives within his first five years in office, if elected. He also promised to develop the tourism sector and improve education across the country.

On 28 July 1978, a public referendum was held, in which Gayoom received 92.96% of the vote, making him president-elect. Following his election, Gayoom faced criticism from the public opposition, who argued he was unfit for the presidency.

=== 1983–1998 presidential elections ===
In the 1983 presidential election, Gayoom was chosen as the sole candidate and was re-elected president on 30 September 1983, receiving 57,913 votes, or 95.62%.

In the 1988 Maldivian presidential election, Gayoom received 69,373 votes and 96.47%. There were 2,537 votes against him.

In the 1993 election, Gayoom and his brother-in-law Ilyas Ibrahim ran for presidency; Gayoom was chosen by the People's Majlis as the sole candidate. He received 92.8% of the votes and was elected for a fourth term on 1 October 1993. Gayoom was elected for a fifth term of office on 16 October 1998, receiving 86,504 votes, or 90.90%.

=== 2003 presidential election ===
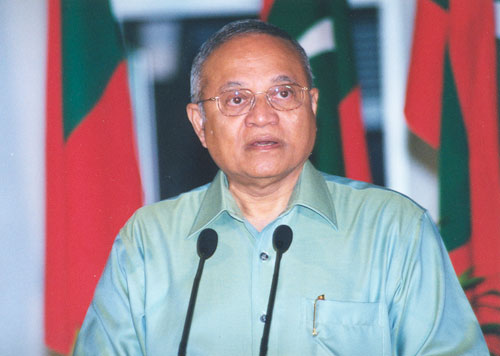
Gayoom speaking during his campaign, in Malé, October 2003

Gayoom was selected as the candidate for the presidential referendum with the votes of all 50 members of the People's Majlis. He secured a sixth term with 90.28% of the vote, amounting to 102,909 ballots in the election. Even with high protests against Gayoom, his victory was widely expected, with the government presenting the outcome as evidence of strong public backing. However, concerns were raised regarding the fairness of the process, as only a single candidate was allowed to seek a popular mandate, and political parties had been banned.

Following the election, it was anticipated by the media, that Gayoom's sixth term would be difficult, as there was growing public pressure for a more open and democratic political system.

=== 2008 presidential election ===
In August 2007, Gayoom, during a trip to Laamu Atoll, announced his candidacy for the 2008 presidential election from the Dhivehi Rayyithunge Party. Although according to DRP's regulations, he was already the official candidate, as the party's leader was automatically nominated for presidential elections. His candidacy was challenged in the Supreme Court of the Maldives, as the new constitution stated that a president could serve only two terms, while Gayoom was seeking a seventh term. He contended that his previous terms should not be counted, as they were served under the old constitution. The Supreme Court of the Maldives agreed, stating that the term limits applied only to terms served "under the new constitution," thus allowing Gayoom to contest the election.

On 5 August 2008, Gayoom chose atoll minister Ahmed Thasmeen Ali as his running mate. Three days afterwards, the presidential campaign began. During the campaign, Gayoom focused on his presidency's reforms in education and healthcare, portraying them as key pillars of national progress under his leadership. He pledged to drive further developments in economic and social development to elevate the Maldives. In his criticism of Mohamed Nasheed, his main opposition, Gayoom questioned Nasheed's capacity to govern, warning that his policies could undermine the Islamic values that form the foundation of Maldivian society and governance.

Gayoom's age concerns also arose during the campaign. During the campaign, the Maldivian Democratic Party accused him of attempting to rig the election and achieve a first-round victory. Several news outlets reported that Gayoom and Nasheed would face each other in a run-off. The election was the first time Gayoom was facing opposition candidates, and the first multi-party elections. Gayoom won the first round of the 2008 Maldivian presidential election with 40.63% of the vote. However, in the second round, he lost to his opponent, Mohamed Nasheed. Gayoom conceded the election the following day in a speech, expressing acceptance of the results and pledging a peaceful transfer of power.

== Presidency (1978–2008) ==
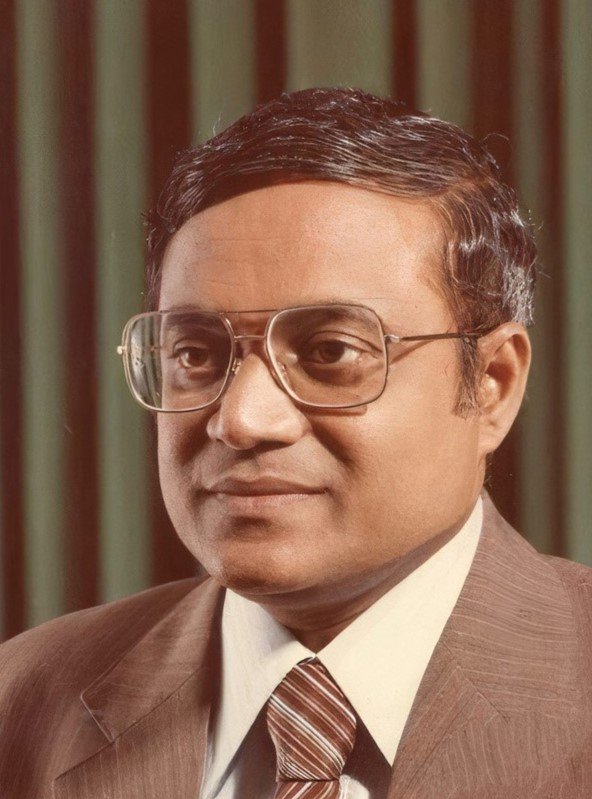
Portrait, c. 1980s

Gayoom was inaugurated as the 3rd President of the Republic of Maldives on 11 November 1978 at 12:00 AM. His oath was administered by judge Moosa Fathhy. One of the first things Gayoom did at the beginning of his administration was upgrading the education and healthcare system in the Maldives.

=== First and second terms (1978–1988) ===
==== 1980 assassination attempt ====
In February 1980, Former president Ibrahim Nasir, along with his brother-in-law Ahmed Naseem, Health Minister Mohamed Musthafa Hussain, and businessman Mohamed Yusuf, hired nine former members of the British Special Air Service (SAS) to carry out an assassination and coup attempt against Gayoom. The mercenaries reportedly operated from a base in Sri Lanka, conducting several reconnaissance trips in preparation for the mission. They were provided with arms and promised a payment of US$60,000 each for their services. However, the assassination attempt was ultimately called off by the SAS operatives due to emerging doubts about the operation.

==== 1987 Great wave ====
On 11 April 1987, a devastating tidal wave, often referred to as the "Great Wave", struck Malé, leaving 16 islands across 13 atolls severely affected and causing damages estimated at MVR 90 million. The disaster is considered one of the most catastrophic natural disasters in Maldivian history.

In an interview during the early 2000s, Gayoom said:

I was driving around Malé, looking around various sites where damage had been done, and all of a sudden there was a very high wave which came into Malé, and it dragged the vehicle I was driving. And the people there, they held onto the vehicle, and in fact, they saved me. Otherwise, I would have been dragged into the sea.

The wave caused remarkable damage to both the outer and inner seawalls of Malé. In response, the Maldivian government sought assistance from Japan, which sent a team of scientists to assess the situation. The Japanese government later supported the reconstruction of the damaged seawalls, helping the country recover from the disaster.

The event drew international attention to the vulnerabilities of small island nations. Gayoom addressed this issue at the 1987 Commonwealth Heads of Government Meeting, proposing the formation of a group of experts to study the impacts of climate change on small island states and low-lying nations. His proposal was adopted at the meeting. He also brought the issue to the United Nations General Assembly, becoming the first world leader to speak about climate change on a global stage.

==== 1988 coup attempt ====
On 3 November 1988, an attempted coup d'état was launched against Gayoom by a group of Maldivians, along with armed mercenaries from the Sri Lankan Tamil militant organisation, the People's Liberation Organisation of Tamil Eelam (PLOTE). The coup was arranged by Abdullah Luthufi, a Maldivian businessman, who sought to overthrow Gayoom's government.

Gayoom's presidency faced weighty opposition, with key figures like Luthufi determined to remove him from power due to dissatisfaction with the political landscape and the perceived lack of opportunities for dissent. Luthufi believed that an outside force was necessary to facilitate this change, as local electoral processes were deemed ineffective. His close association with the People's Liberation Organisation of Tamil Eelam (PLOTE) allowed him to negotiate for military support in the form of an 80-member raiding party. Strategic discussions regarding a sea-borne raid began in 1987, influenced by the deployment of the Indian Peace Keeping Force in Sri Lanka. Additionally, Luthufi secured support from sympathetic members of the Maldivian military, highlighting the complexities of the political situation during Gayoom's rule.

Gayoom reached out to neighbouring and other countries for assistance, contacting India, United Kingdom, United States and Singapore for military aid. Indian prime minister Rajiv Gandhi responded promptly, and within hours, India launched Operation Cactus. Indian paratroopers were airlifted to the Maldives and landed in Malé on the same day, securing key locations and restoring order. The Indian intervention was decisive, with the coup leaders unable to mount resistance once foreign troops arrived. Many of the PLOTE mercenaries were captured, while others fled the country, but were later caught.

The coup attempt was effectively quashed within hours of the Indian military's arrival. The quick resolution of the coup attempt strengthened Gayoom's position, and he publicly expressed gratitude towards the Indian government for its timely intervention.

Following the coup attempt, planner Abdulla Lutfi and his assistant Sagar Nasir were sentenced to death. However, according to Gayoom, the sentences were reduced to a life sentence of 25 years. Following the coup attempt, a small number of Indian soldiers remained in Malé for a year to protect Gayoom from further threats.

=== Other terms (1988–2008) ===
==== 2004 tsunami ====
Address to the nation
Gayoom addressing the nation following the tsunami, 26 December 2004

The 2004 Indian Ocean tsunami was a major turning point in Gayoom's presidential administration. In response to the 2004 Indian Ocean tsunami, President Gayoom addressed the nation on the evening of the disaster, stating that citizens should work together with the government to recover from the losses.

The tsunami caused extensive devastation, resulting in the loss of more than three decades of development and an estimated 62% of the country's GDP and a damage cost of approximately US$460 million. According to World Bank estimates, the Maldives experienced a GDP growth rate of 13.75% in 2003; however, this plummeted to -11.223% in 2004 as a direct consequence of the tsunami. Regardless of various recovery efforts, many damages remained unresolved by the end of Gayoom's presidency.

Gayoom declared a state of emergency following the national disaster on the same day, and a special task force was established to deliver aid and supplies. Rescue efforts were hindered by the loss of communication with the nation's over 1,000 islands, as well as the lack of sufficient disaster planning.

==== Malé bombing ====
Following the first bomb explosion in Malé on 29 September 2007, which targeted foreign tourists, the government, under the presidency of Gayoom, expressed serious concern over the rising threat of Islamic extremism. In response, the government initiated measures to address religious fundamentalism and militancy; the authorities declared that clerics or mullahs with beards would be prohibited from entering the country unless specifically invited by the government.

==== 2008 assassination attempt ====
On 8 January 2008, Gayoom was visiting Hoarafushi in Haa Alif Atoll. Mohamed Murshid attempted to stab Gayoom in the stomach with a kitchen knife; however, the attack was thwarted by Mohamed Jaisham Ibrahim, a 16-year-old boy scout from Kudahuvadhoo, who intervened and blocked the attack with his own hands. Jaisham sustained injuries during this act and required medical treatment, later being treated at Indira Gandhi Memorial Hospital. Following the incident, Gayoom stated, "By the grace of Almighty Allah, I am well and safe, but severe injuries have been inflicted on this brave young man from this island, Mohamed Jaisham. He is a true hero. I sincerely thank him and his family, and I pray to Almighty Allah for his speedy recovery."

=== Foreign policy ===
==== Palestine and Israel ====
During his presidency, Gayoom took a firm stance on the Israeli–Palestinian conflict, which was a defining feature of his foreign policy. Within a week of taking office in 1978, Gayoom severed diplomatic relations with Israel that had been established under the previous administration of Ibrahim Nasir. Gayoom supported for an independent Palestinian state with East Jerusalem as its capital. He argued that this move was necessary to align with the Maldives' broader support for Palestinian self-determination. In 1984, Gayoom invited Palestinian leader Yasser Arafat to the Maldives, and he undertook a state visit in July the same year.

Gayoom also attempted economic partnerships to strengthen ties with Palestine. His administration launched "Maldives Airways" in collaboration with the Palestinian government, with a fleet of four airplanes. However, the airline faced financial challenges, attributed to international sanctions and economic pressure, which led to its bankruptcy by 1984. Due to the airline's failure, Gayoom's administration continued efforts to support Palestine through other means, such as organising nationwide fundraising campaigns, with donation boxes set up throughout the Maldives.

==== South and East Asia ====
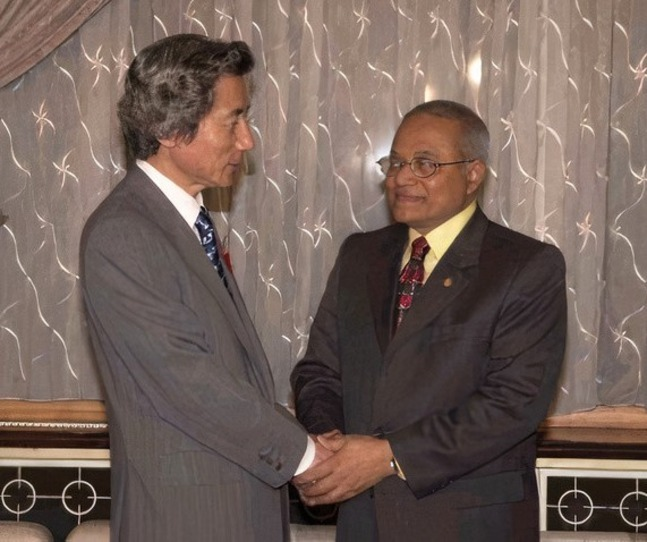
Gayoom with Japanese prime minister Junichiro Koizumi, 2001 in Japan

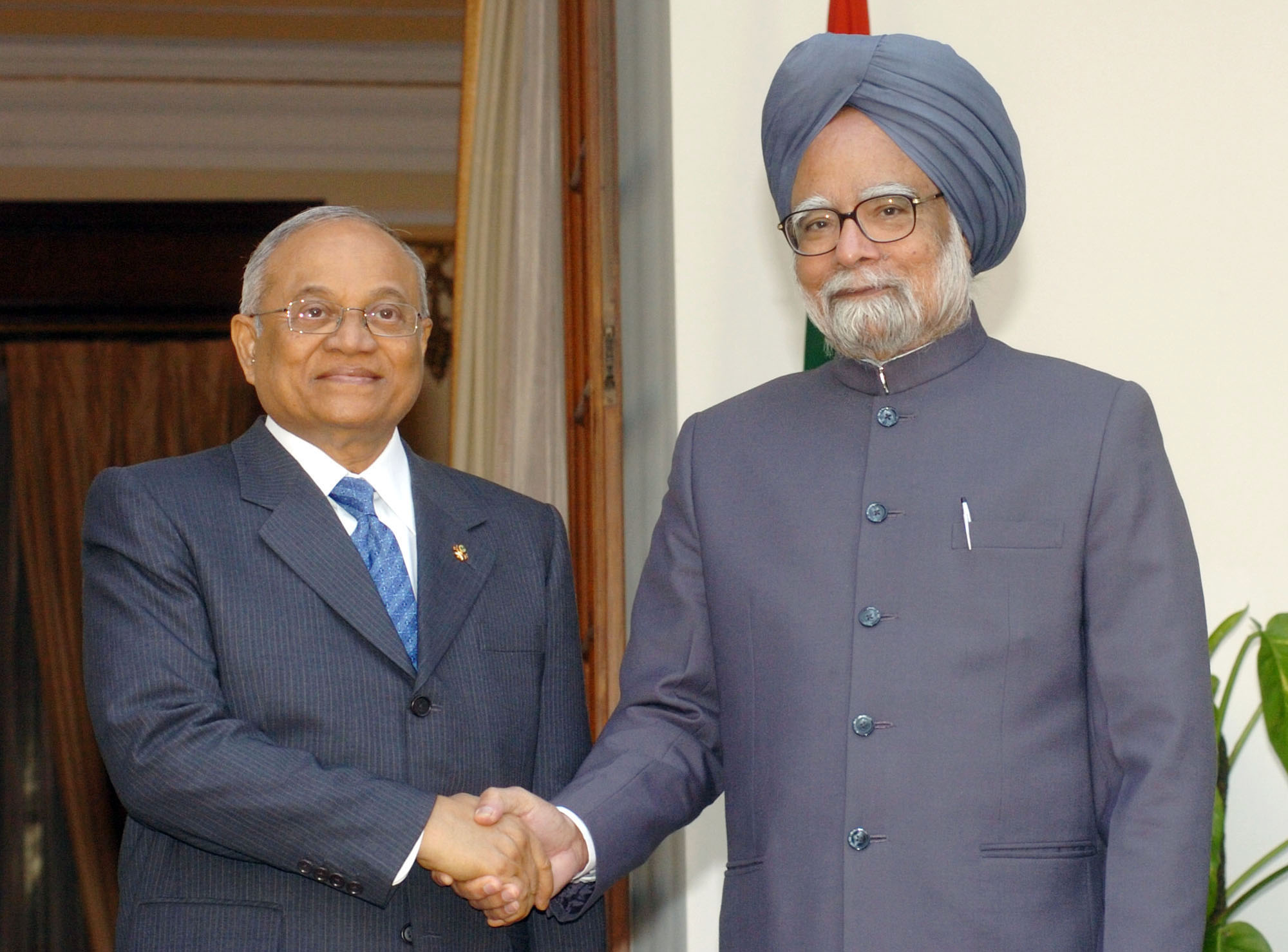
Gayoom with the Indian prime minister Manmohan Singh in 2008

During Gayoom's presidency, his foreign policy towards South and East Asia was centered on strengthening ties with key regional players, particularly India, China, and Japan.

Gayoom maintained a close relationship with India, which was pivotal during the 1988 coup attempt when India responded with "Operation Cactus" to retain his government. Gayoom sought to balance the Maldives' foreign policy by establishing ties with China, especially as China's influence in the Indian Ocean grew through infrastructure investments and the Belt and Road Initiative (BRI). Relationships demonstrated Gayoom's pragmatic approach to foreign policy, ensuring the Maldives benefitted from both regional powers without becoming overly dependent on one. China's growing presence was evident in infrastructure projects such as airports and bridges, but the administration was careful to avoid granting military footholds to Beijing, which would have alarmed India.

In October 1984, Gayoom made the first visit to China by a Maldivian head of state since the establishment of diplomatic relations between the two countries in 1972. The visit was made at the invitation of Chinese president. Upon touching down, Gayoom was greeted by Chinese president Li Xiannian. During the trip, an agreement on economic and technical cooperation was signed between the governments of China and the Maldives.

==== Africa and the Middle East ====
Gayoom's tenure as president saw the Maldives strengthening ties with African nations, particularly through multilateral organisations such as the Commonwealth of Nations and the United Nations, where he sought cooperation on shared challenges, such as climate change and development initiatives. He established relations with more than 25 countries in the African continent, during his presidential administration. He strongly advocated for the complete and rapid eradication of apartheid and supported the South African people's right to self-determination. His vocal opposition to apartheid strengthened the Maldives' standing in international forums, where he consistently called for the end of racial oppression and supported liberation movements in Africa.

The situation in southern Africa continues to constitute a threat to the peace and security of the region. We in the Maldives strongly object to the policy of apartheid and racial discrimination since it violates all fundamental human values. We emphasise the need for the total and speedy eradication of apartheid and for the exercise, by the South African people, of their legitimate right to self-determination.

— Statement by Gayoom to the UNGA

In the Middle East, Gayoom prioritised relations with Saudi Arabia and other Gulf states. Saudi Arabia was a crucial ally, providing financial aid, religious scholarships, and investments that supported the Maldives's development. Diplomatic exchanges between the two nations were frequent, and the relationship was anchored in Islamic solidarity. Gayoom's government also sought to deepen ties with other Gulf countries like Kuwait and the United Arab Emirates. These partnerships focused on economic cooperation, with the Gulf states contributing to various infrastructure projects in the Maldives. In 1981, Gayoom established diplomatic relations between Saudi Arabia and the Maldives in history.

==== United States and Europe ====
In the realm of security, the Maldives sought to strengthen ties with the United States to enhance its own national security and regional stability. Given its strategic location in the Indian Ocean, the Maldives was seen as an important partner in U.S. efforts to combat piracy and terrorism in the region. Gayoom's government actively cooperated with the U.S. on maritime security initiatives and participated in international discussions concerning security challenges. This cooperation was mutually beneficial, as it provided the Maldives with increased visibility on the global stage while aligning with U.S. interests in ensuring a secure maritime environment. During the aftermath of the 2004 Indian Ocean tsunami, as part of their tour to affected countries due to the tsunami in 2005, former U.S. presidents Bill Clinton and George H. W. Bush travelled to the Maldives and met Gayoom.

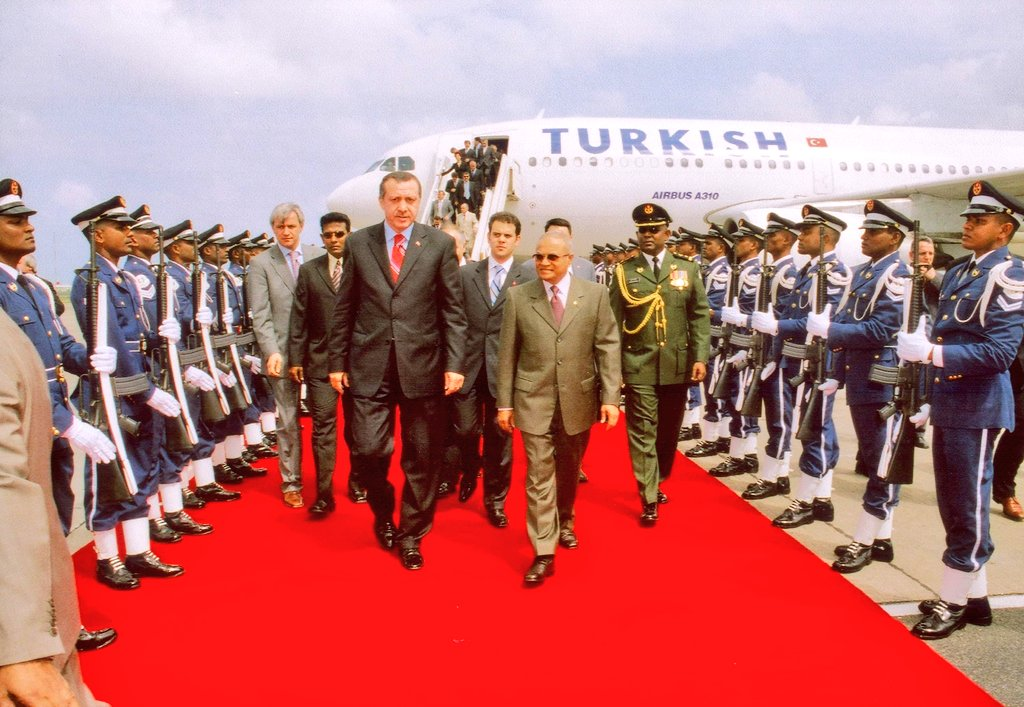
Gayoom receives Turkish prime minister Recep Tayyip Erdoğan at Velana International Airport in 2005

During the presidency of Gayoom, relations between the Maldives and the United States were marked by cooperation and economic support. The U.S. contributed to the Maldives's economic development mainly through international organisation programmes. Following the December 2004 Indian Ocean tsunami, the two countries signed a bilateral assistance agreement, providing $8.6 million for reconstruction efforts. This aid was directed towards rebuilding harbours, sewage systems, and electrical generation facilities, while also helping the Ministry of Finance improve its capacity to manage and absorb international assistance.

During his presidency, the Maldives established and nurtured strong relations with various European countries, particularly in the areas of trade, tourism, and development cooperation. The Maldives became an attractive destination for European tourists, which boosted its economy and helped the nation diversify its income sources. European nations, particularly the United Kingdom, Germany, and Italy, played a crucial role in promoting Maldivian tourism, contributing to the growth of the hospitality industry and infrastructure development.

==== International trips ====
Countries visited by Gayoom during his presidency in dark blue; Maldives in Red

Gayoom made a number of visits to more than 35 countries during his 30 years of presidency. His first visit following first inauguration, was to Libya to attend 1 September revolution celebrations in the country. He became the first Maldivian president to visit Libya, Senegal and South Africa. At the end of his presidency, Gayoom had visited India over sixteen times in various capacities, making him the Maldivian president with the most visits to India.

=== Domestic policy ===
==== Health and education policy ====
Education and healthcare policies were one of the most important–focused subjects during the presidential administration of Gayoom.

When Gayoom became president in 1978, the Maldives lacked a formal education system beyond the capital Malé, although two secondary schools and basic educational infrastructure existed there. In early 1979, his government conducted a study that revealed 24.77% of the population was illiterate. In response, the government launched the "Basic Education Project" in January 1980, aimed at eradicating illiteracy. The project began the following month, with the start of teaching basic education classes. Over time, the initiative reduced the illiteracy rate, bringing it down to 1.06% by 1999. Gayoom made education a key priority, aiming to expand access across the country. His government began by establishing primary schools in the atolls, with Gayoom personally inaugurating the first in South Miladhunmadulu Atoll in March 1979, months after assuming office.

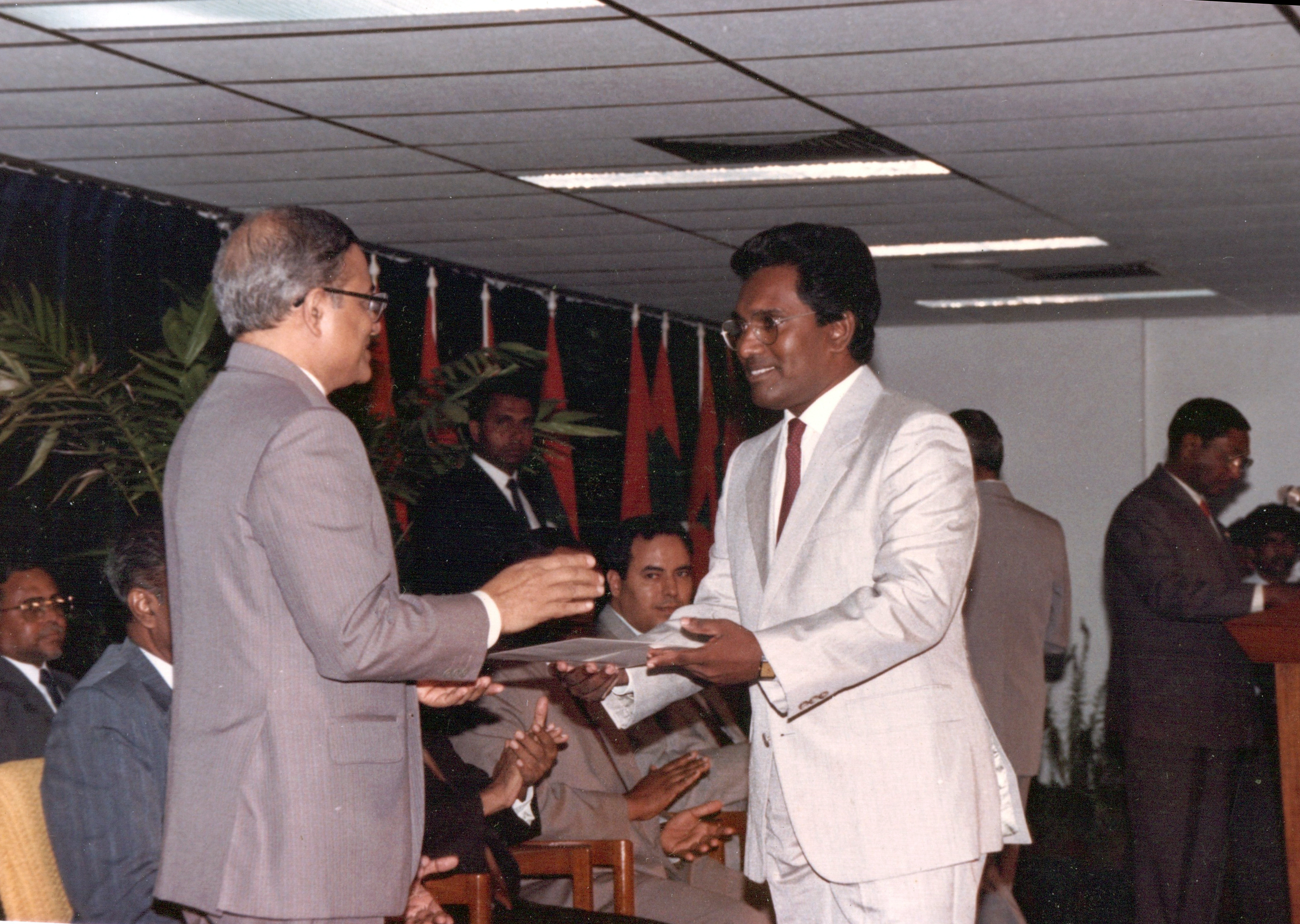
Gayoom awarding the future president Mohamed Waheed Hassan in 1989

A national curriculum was introduced, and efforts were made to provide seven years of primary education to Maldivian children. Additionally, two secondary schools were established in the atolls, reducing the need for students to move to Malé for higher education. The number of students sitting for the GCE ordinary Level examinations grew from 102 in 1978 to 6,495 in 2002. Total student enrolment increased from around 15,000 in 1978 to 97,323 in 1998, and the literacy rate improved from 70% to 98.82% by the same year. By 1999, 254 schools with 2,646 teachers were providing education up to Grade 10.

Gayoom's administration introduced many healthcare reforms in the late 1970s, when the Maldives had limited medical facilities, including just one small hospital and basic health services. His government prioritised improving maternal and child health, contributing to an increase in life expectancy from 48 years in 1978 to 71 years by 1998. Universal immunisation was achieved by 1990, and the government implemented measures to combat communicable diseases. Gayoom's administration also launched public health campaigns promoting healthy living, balanced diets, and the risks of tobacco consumption.

By 1998, the physician to population ratio had improved from one per 20,700 people in 1978 to one per 1,300, and hospital bed capacity increased nearly tenfold.

==== Human rights policy ====
Gayoom's presidency was marked by controversy, particularly regarding human rights issues. International human rights organisations and foreign governments have accused his administration of employing tactics against dissidents, including arbitrary arrest and detention, torture, forced confessions, and politically motivated killings. Reports indicated that security forces were sometimes used to intimidate opposition figures.

Criticism of Gayoom's governance came from various quarters, including foreign nations such as those within the European Union and the Commonwealth of Nations, which expressed concerns over his long-term rule and described it as autocratic. Critics highlighted issues related to the abuse of power, and some characterised his leadership style as dictatorial, pointing to limitations on political freedoms. The complex nature of his legacy continues to be a topic of discussion, with supporters citing developmental achievements while critics emphasise human rights violations.

Towards the end of his presidency, Gayoom apologised for his actions, saying:

If any Maldivian citizen has had to endure undeserved hardship or distress due to a policy I implemented, a decision I made, or due to my failure to give proper attention where it was needed, I sincerely regret it. And if any citizen has experienced such a situation, I humbly ask for generous forgiveness from that citizen.

==== Economic policy ====
The contribution of the tourism and fisheries industries to the GDP of the Maldives between 1980 and 2002

During the Gayoom's administration, tourism became the largest industry in the Maldives, a status it continues to hold. By the 1980s, tourism accounted for 28% of the nation's GDP and more than 60% of its foreign exchange receipts. This sector played a critical role in driving economic growth, with GDP per capita expanding by 265% during the 1980s and a further 115% in the 1990s. The tourism industry's rapid development underpinned the Maldives' economic success, and this expansion provided a steady source of income and foreign currency, which helped to stabilise the economy during Gayoom's rule.

Under Gayoom's leadership, the tourism industry was restructured in 1979 with the introduction of the Tourism Act, which established regulations to manage entry into the sector through capacity control. These measures improved standards in existing resorts and increased profitability. By the end of the 20th century, tourism became a vital part of the Maldivian economy, contributing to GDP and providing a crucial source of foreign currency.

Gayoom's government initiated economic reforms in 1989, aimed at liberalising the economy. These reforms included lifting import quotas and opening certain sectors for export to private enterprises. The liberalisation also extended to foreign investment regulations, encouraging more international involvement in the Maldivian economy. The nation's GDP grew rapidly, with the gross domestic product rising from MVR 440 million in 1980 to MVR 10,458 million by 2005, according to International Monetary Fund estimates.

Throughout the 1980s, the Maldivian economy experienced relatively low inflation, with real GDP growth averaging around 10%. The year 1990 saw an exceptional GDP growth rate of 16.2%, although this figure declined to 4% by 1993. Due to slowdown, the economy continued to perform strongly, with an average real GDP growth of over 7.5% per year from 1995 to 2004. The sustained growth during this period was largely driven by a combination of tourism, fishing, and increased foreign investment, which helped the country weather regional economic challenges.

The Indian Ocean tsunami of 2004, however, caused a sharp contraction in the economy, with the GDP loss of approximately 62%; the Maldivian economy demonstrated resilience, rebounding strongly with a 13% growth rate in 2006. The recovery was driven by a revival in tourism and infrastructure development efforts, supported by international aid and investments. Under Gayoom's administration, the Maldives managed to maintain steady economic growth, regardless of external shocks, while fostering a more open and diversified economy.

==== Environmental policies ====
Gayoom awards Ibrahim Shihab in 1979

During his presidency, Gayoom was a strong advocate for environmental protection and climate diplomacy, both nationally and internationally. His administration became one of the first to bring international attention to the potential consequences of climate change for low-lying nations. In 1987, following severe flooding that inundated much of the capital, Malé, Gayoom recognised the looming threat posed by rising sea levels and environmental degradation. He became the first-ever world leader to address the United Nations General Assembly on the dangers of climate change, urging urgent global action on what was, at the time, still a relatively unknown issue.

Gayoom's landmark "Death of a Nation" speech at the UNGA is often credited as one of the earliest and most influential calls for global cooperation in combating climate change. His warnings about the vulnerability of small island nations like the Maldives highlighted the risks posed by global warming and sea level rise, issues that were not widely recognised at the time. This intervention marked the beginning of the Maldives' active participation in global climate diplomacy, reinforcing the nation's commitment to advocating for the protection of environmentally fragile states on the international stage.

In addition to his efforts within the Maldives, Gayoom also spearheaded regional environmental cooperation. Under his leadership, the Maldives played an important role in the South Asian Association for Regional Cooperation (SAARC) Study on causes and consequences of natural disasters and the Protection and Preservation of the Environment. It helped build regional awareness of environmental risks, particularly in relation to natural disasters and the long-term impacts of environmental degradation. Gayoom's focus on regional cooperation helped to enhance the Maldives' preparedness for climate-related challenges. In 1989, the Maldives hosted the first Small States Conference on Sea Level Rise, signing the "Malé Declaration on Global Warming and Sea Level Rise", a treaty urging nations to recognise sea level rise as a global security threat and take urgent action to mitigate its impacts. In 2007, representatives of Small Island Developing States signed the "Malé Declaration on the Human Dimension of Global Climate Change", a treaty signed by representatives of Small Island Developing States to highlight the critical links between climate change and human rights.

Furthermore, Gayoom's government initiated the SAARC Study on the Greenhouse effect and its impact on the region. In 1989, Gayoom initiated the Commonwealth Study on Climate Change, which focused on the effects of global warming on Commonwealth nations, particularly small island states. The study, reviewed in 1991, highlighted the pressing need for international cooperation in addressing the challenges posed by rising sea levels and other environmental threats. Gayoom's proactive approach in commissioning and participating of climate-change and environmental topics helped establish the Maldives as a global leader in climate diplomacy and advocacy for small island states.

==== Political reforms ====
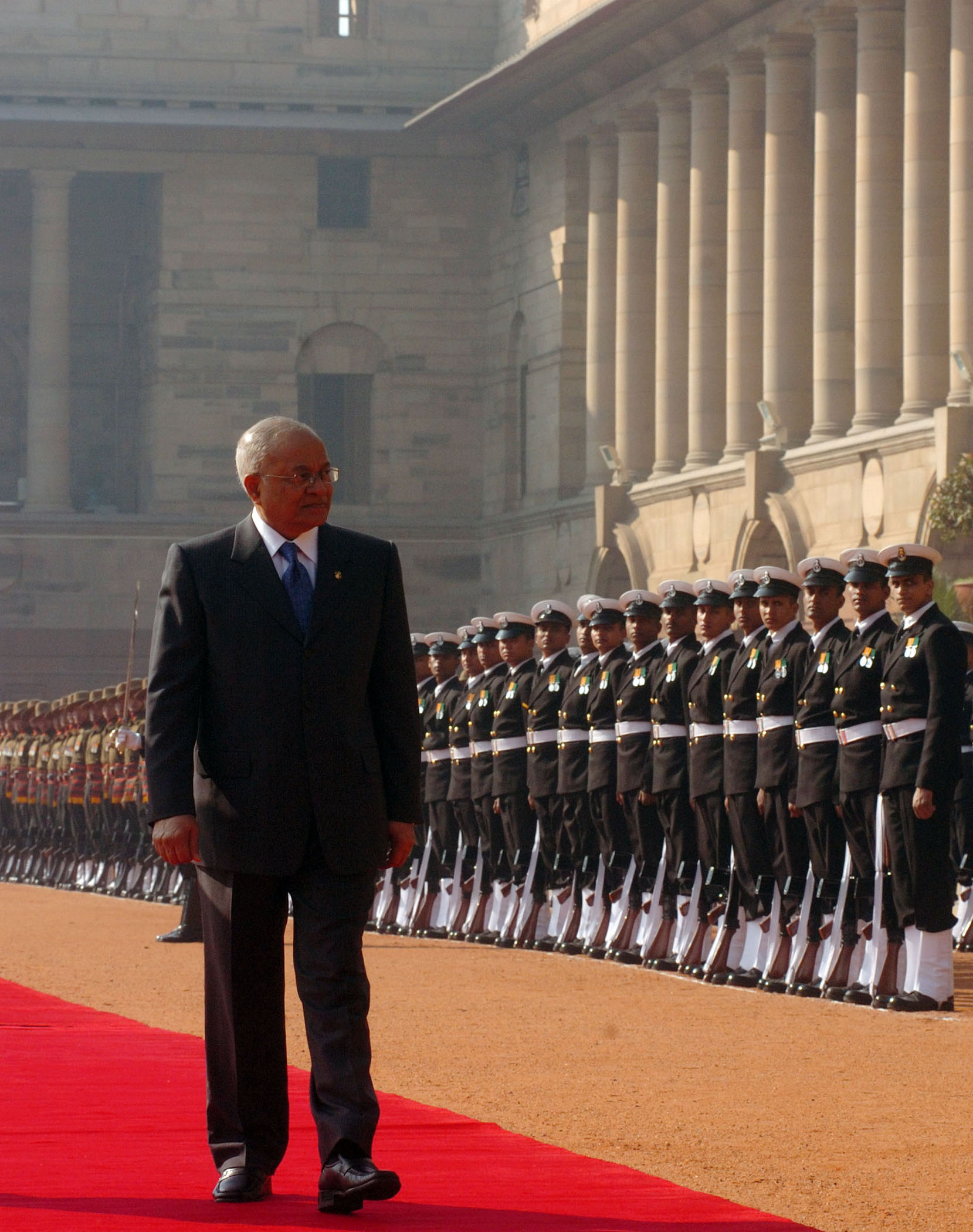
State visit to India, 2008

A month after Gayoom assumed the presidency, the Citizen's Majlis passed the bill to amend the constitution. By 1980, Gayoom declared to form a special constitutional assembly, consisting of cabinet members and parliamentarians, to amend the constitution. After an 18-year process, the amended constitution was finalised, and by November 1997, Gayoom ratified the constitution. In 1998, the new constitution came info effect—declaring the Maldives a democratic republic (though it did not fully follow democratic principles). In June 2004, Gayoom launched the "democratic reform agenda" in response to growing calls for political liberalisation and greater civil liberties. Over the following years, notable progress was made — a National Human Rights Commission adhering to international standards was established, political parties were introduced for the first time in 2005, media freedom was granted, and the criminal justice system was modernised.

In 2007, after several rounds of negotiations with opposition parties, particularly the Maldivian Democratic Party (MDP), an agreement was reached. The MDP pledged not to engage in violence, while the government committed to releasing political detainees and accelerating the reform process. Concerns over the pace of reforms remained, with some doubting the government's full commitment to change.

By 2008, Gayoom emphasised the progress achieved through his reform agenda. The drafting of a new constitution was nearing completion, aimed at facilitating the transition to a fully liberal democracy. The new constitution introduced a clearer separation of powers, stronger human rights protections, and established independent institutions, including an autonomous Elections Commission and a Supreme Court.

This constitution, finalised later 2008, marked a turning point in Maldivian political history. It introduced a multi-party system, limited the presidency to two five-year terms, and created the framework for greater transparency and accountability. Gayoom's administration also prepared for the country's first multi-party presidential election, proposing legislative reforms to guarantee the elections met international standards.

== Post-presidency (2008–present) ==
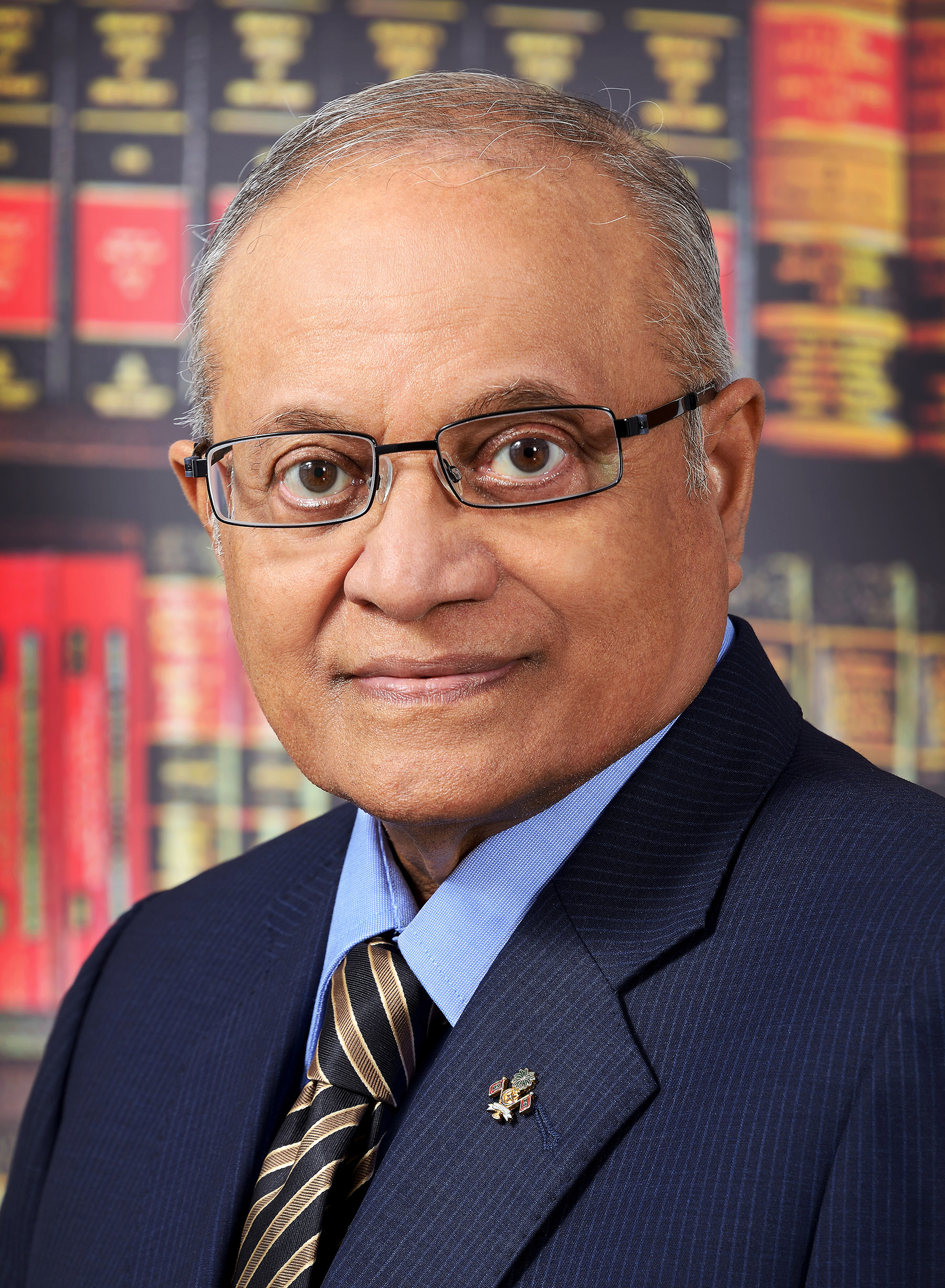
Gayoom's Award winner portrait, 2013

Following the inauguration of Mohamed Nasheed on 11 November 2008, Gayoom moved to his private residence in Malé. Gayoom made regular appearances at various events throughout the Malé city, until his imprisonment in 2018, and remained low public profile ever since.

In 2010, Gayoom established his non-profit organisation, "the Maumoon Foundation", to support initiatives aimed at improving the livelihoods of the Maldivian people, utilising his resources, contacts, and experience.

In January 2010, Gayoom announced he would be retiring from Maldivian politics. Gayoom returned to politics in 2011 after resigning from the Dhivehi Rayyithunge Party, which he had established. He cited corruption within the party's leadership as his primary reason for leaving, following disputes with the then party leader, Ahmed Thasmeen Ali. In early 2011, Gayoom formed a political faction within the DRP known as the Z-DRP, reflecting growing dissent over the party's direction. On 4 September 2011, Gayoom officially announced his resignation from the DRP, declaring that the Z-DRP would evolve into a new party that prioritised integrity and was independent of the DRP's influences. In September 2011, plans were revealed by Gayoom, for the Progressive Party of Maldives (PPM). The PPM received formal approval from the Elections Commission in October 2011.

In 2016, a leadership dispute emerged between Abdulla Yameen and Gayoom, leading to rapid changes within the Progressive Party of Maldives. Tensions escalated when Gayoom faced challenges to his authority within the party. In 2017, PPM members voted to remove Gayoom as the party leader. Legal actions were initiated by two Members of Parliament, Ahmed Shiyam and Mohamed Shahid, who filed a case in the Civil Court to formally oust Gayoom from his leadership position.

In 2019, Gayoom announced his intention to establish a new political party, the Maldives Reform Movement. Following its establishment, he was appointed the interim president. Gayoom's son, Ahmed Faris Maumoon was later elected as the president and leader of the Maldives Reform Movement. During the 2021 MRM primaries, Gayoom ran for the party's leader position. He was elected by acclamation as the leader of the party.

=== Views on later presidents and diplomacy ===
Gayoom made a number of visits to countries as a special envoy of the president of the Maldives. After his half-brother Abdulla Yameen won the 2013 election, they had a good relationship at the time, where Yameen sent Gayoom to represent him in different meetings and conferences. One month after Yameen assumed presidency, Gayoom presented a letter from Yameen to the then-former Malaysian prime minister Mahathir Mohamad. In 2014, Gayoom undertook an official visit to Samoa as a special envoy of the president at the Third International Conference on Small Island Developing States.

During the Chinese Communist Party leader and Chinese president Xi Jinping's state visit to the Maldives in 2014, Gayoom held a meeting with him. Gayoom also sent condolences to former Singaporean prime minister Lee Kuan Yew, representing Yameen in 2015. In July that year, he undertook an official visit to Oman as special envoy of the president and met with officials to discuss on improving bilateral relations between Oman and the Maldives.

==== Views on presidents ====
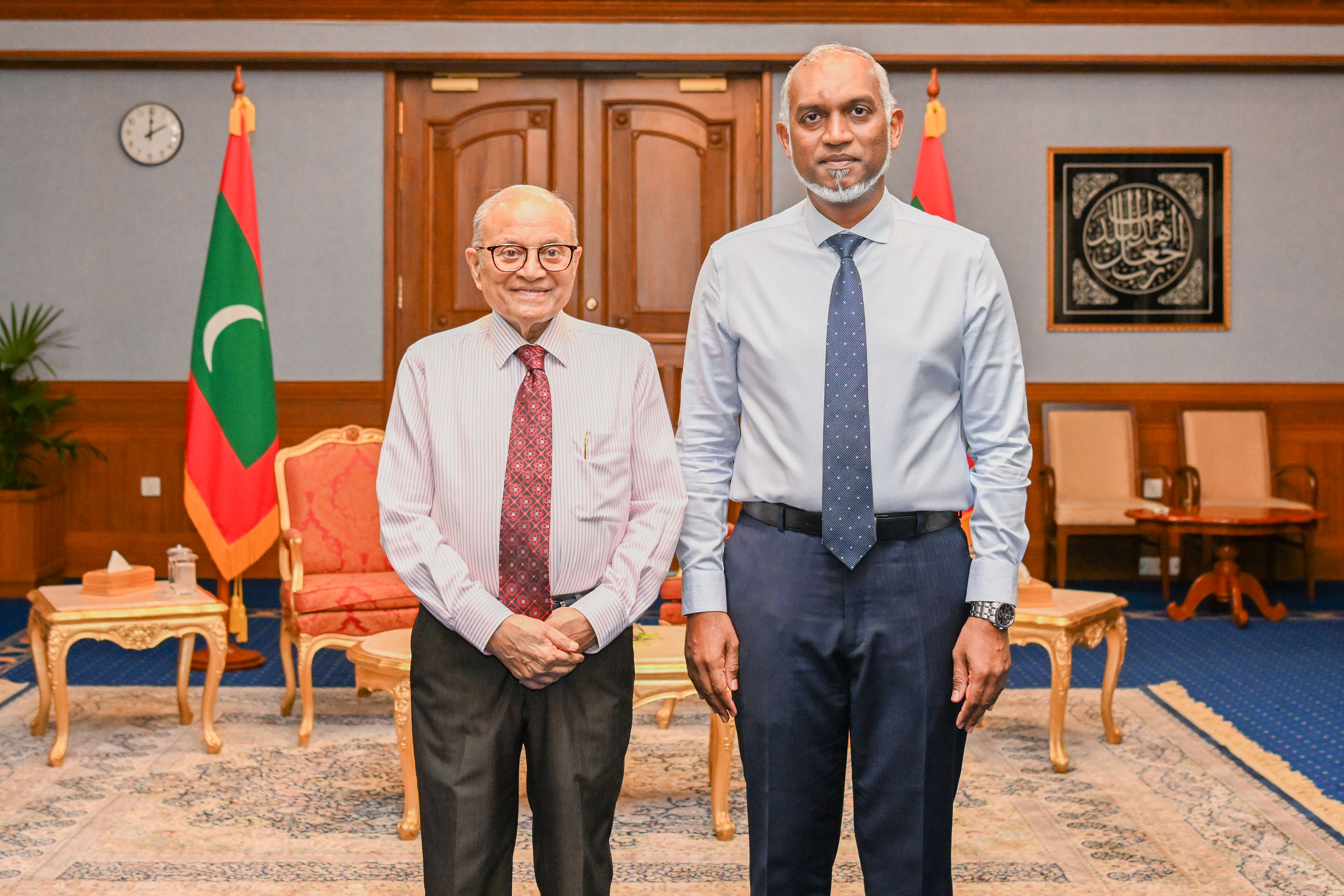
Gayoom meets president Mohamed Muizzu in December 2023

Gayoom was a vocal critic of the Mohamed Nasheed administration, often opposing its policies and governance style. He and his supporters accused Nasheed's government of economic mismanagement. Gayoom also raised concerns about Nasheed's approach to religion and democracy, arguing that it risked undermining traditional values. During 2011–12, Gayoom and supporters protested, which president Nasheed and the government described as "violent" and a "coup". Later the protests became an unrest, leading to the resignation of president Mohamed Nasheed.

Though he praised President Yameen in the early part of his tenure, after 2015, relations between Gayoom and his half-brother Abdulla Yameen began to deteriorate, with the two ceasing communication following political disagreements and a leadership dispute within Gayoom's Progressive Party of Maldives. In 2017, Gayoom apologised for supporting Abdulla Yameen in the 2013 presidential election, expressing regret for his role in Yameen's rise to power.

During the Ibrahim Mohamed Solih administration, Gayoom did not majorly critique the administration but commented on specific issues, expressing dissatisfaction with certain aspects.

=== Presidential politics ===
After Gayoom lost the 2008 presidential election and the inauguration of Mohamed Nasheed, Gayoom did not majorly react to Nasheed administration in the first years. In the 2013 presidential election, many Maldivian citizens gave the opinion for Gayoom to run in the elections, however he declared in February 2013 that he would not run any further presidential elections. Later then Progressive Party of Maldives held its primary elections and was won by Gayoom's half-brother Abdulla Yameen, in which he endorsed Yameen.

In the 2018 presidential elections, Gayoom endorsed Ibrahim Mohamed Solih, while Yameen was running; the decision was made following the imprisonment of Gayoom by Yameen in 2018.

During the 2023 presidential election, Gayoom's elder son Ahmed Faris Maumoon was running as an independent candidate after Elections Commission rejected his candidacy as a Maldives Reform Movement candidate due to lack of members in the party. Gayoom endorsed Faris and his running mate Abdul Sattar Yoosuf in the elections.

=== Arrest and imprisonment ===
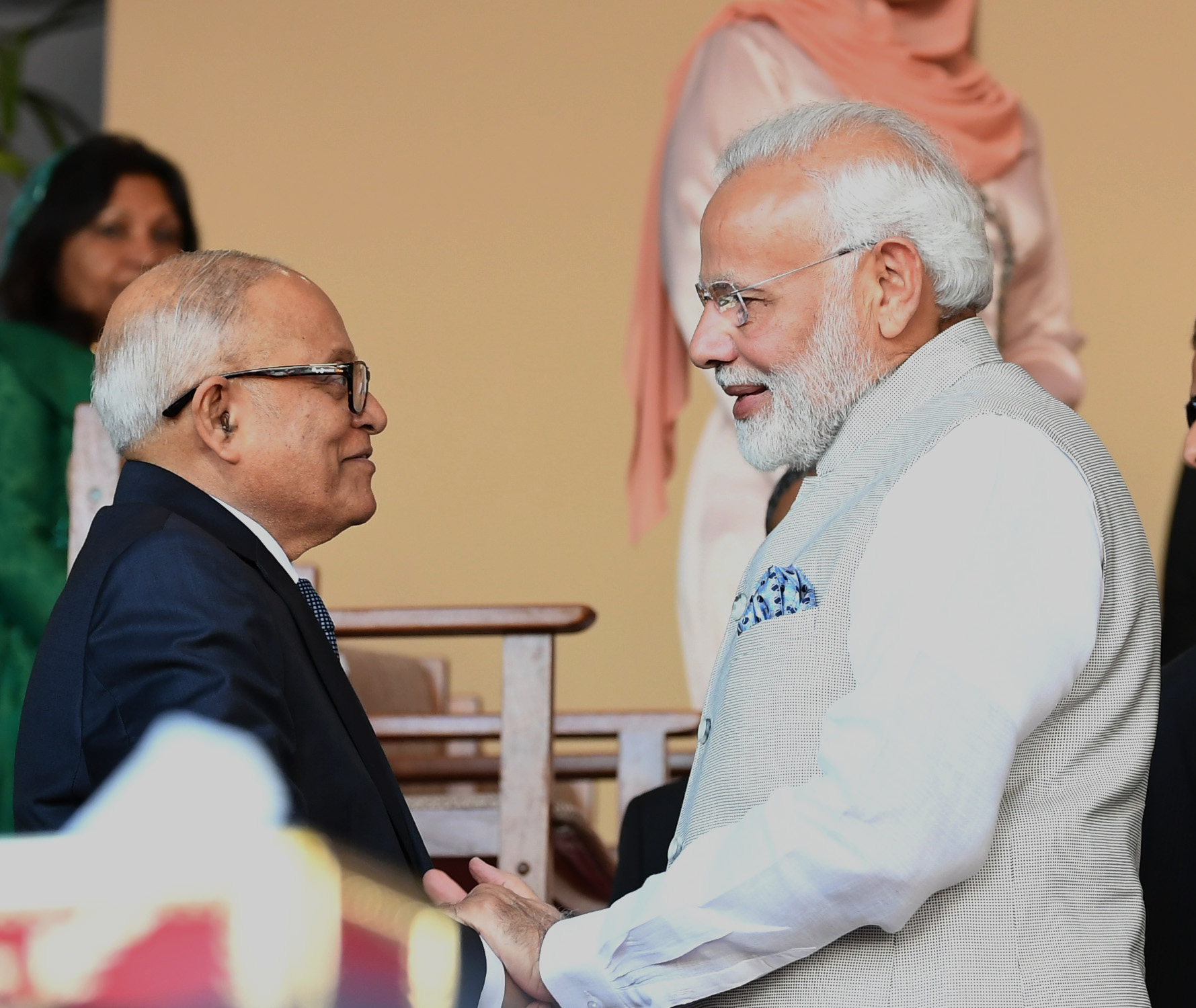
Gayoom with Indian prime minister Narendra Modi in November 2018

On 5 February 2018, Gayoom was arrested for planning to overthrow his half-brother Abdulla Yameen Abdul Gayoom's government, along with his son-in-law, Mohamed Nadheem. His arrest occurred amid an emergency martial law declared by then-President Abdulla Yameen, who justified the actions by alleging a conspiracy and coup attempt. International and nationwide reactions came quickly; Maldivians started protesting the following day as the government declared state emergency.

Shortly before his arrest, Gayoom posted a video message on Twitter, stating, "I have not done anything to be arrested. I urge you to remain steadfast in your resolve too. We will not give up on the reform work we are doing". Media reported that Gayoom and his son Faris were being tortured by not being allowed medical treatment.

On 13 June 2018, Gayoom was sentenced to 19 months in prison for "obstructing justice" after refusing to cooperate with the Maldives police and the judiciary following his arrest. In September 2018, he was placed under house arrest due to health concerns. Gayoom was released on bail on 30 September 2018 and was acquitted on 18 October 2018.

==== Reactions ====
International organisations, including the United Nations, expressed concern over the political situation, condemning the arrest as part of a broader "attack on democracy" in the Maldives. The UN urged the Maldivian government to respect judicial independence and fundamental freedoms, criticising the suppression of dissent and the crackdown on political opponents. Human rights groups also voiced their opposition to Gayoom's detention, calling for his immediate release and for the government to uphold democratic norms.

Domestically, Gayoom's arrest deepened the political divide in the country. Opposition leaders, including former President Mohamed Nasheed, condemned the arrest and called for international intervention. Nasheed appealed to India and the United States to step in, asserting that Yameen's actions threatened the rule of law and democratic governance in the Maldives. It is widely believed that the crisis resulted to Yameen's defeat in the 2018 presidential election.

== Public image ==
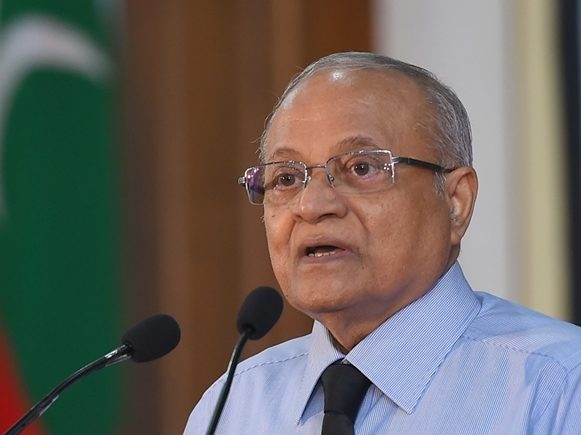
Gayoom speaking in a podium in 2015

Gayoom is regarded as one of the most influential figures in Maldivian history. At 88 years old, he is the oldest living former president and is the earliest-serving living former president since the death of Ibrahim Nasir in 2008. Gayoom's leadership has left an important mark on the country's political landscape.

Gayoom was seen as a moderniser and a stabilising force in the Maldives. His leadership brought remarkable advancements in infrastructure, education, and healthcare, earning him substantial support among Maldivians. Many viewed him as a visionary leader who played a crucial role in bringing the Maldives into the modern era and fostering economic growth. His tenure is often credited with elevating the country's global standing and improving the quality of life for its citizens. His presidency is also often referred to as "Golden 30 years".

However, Gayoom's long rule also attracted considerable criticism, particularly regarding his administration's handling of political dissent and human rights. Critics accused his government of authoritarian practices, including suppressing opposition voices and restricting freedoms of expression. Allegations contributed to a divided view of his leadership, with some seeing him as a benevolent ruler who maintained stability, while others viewed him as an autocratic leader resistant to democratic reforms.

Although facing accusations of authoritarianism, Gayoom hinted that he was not an authoritarian, stating:

I am not someone who wants to remain in power in the Maldives through force, nor am I someone who wants to hold any position through force. Therefore, I am here as someone who did not come to the position of president through force, and I am also not someone who wants to remain in this position using brute force. I am always ready to do things as the people wish. Even today, if the people say they want me to give up this position, I will give it up immediately. However, I will fight against anyone who tries to remove me from this position illegally, using weapons, or by force.

— Gayoom's address to the nation following coup attempt, 5 November 1988,

A 2024 poll by the organisation Maahdhaa4 ranks him as a top-performing president. In the years following his presidency, Gayoom's role in politics has continued to shape his public perception. He is often regarded as a senior statesman, maintaining remarkable influence in the political sphere. While his supporters continue to view him as the "father of the modern Maldives", Gayoom has been described by journalists, politicians, and organisations as a dictator, autocrat, an authoritarian, and a strongman. During his presidency, the opposition referred to him as "Golhaaboa" to criticise his leadership, while his supporters called him "Zaeem", meaning "leader".

=== Health ===
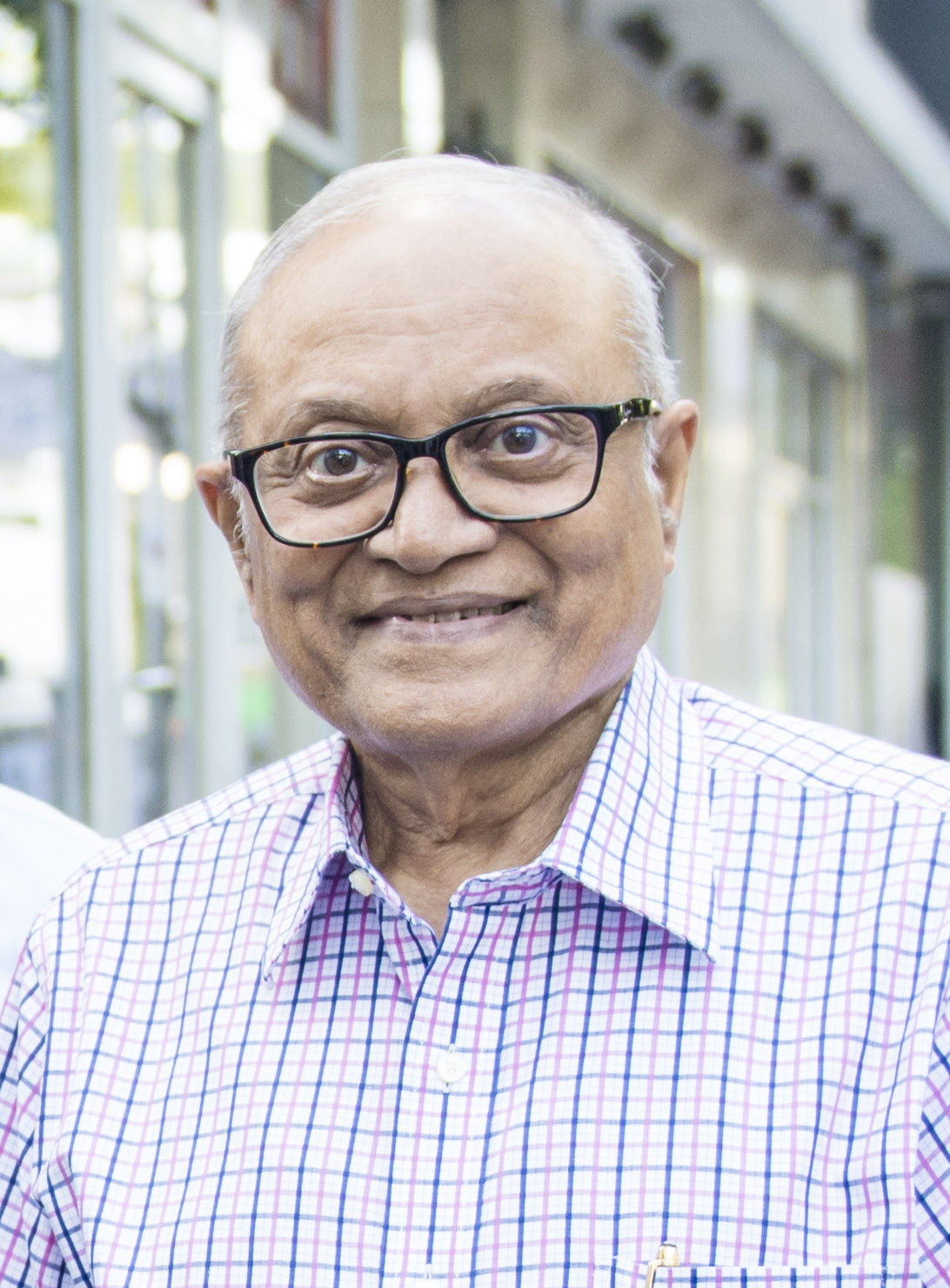
Gayoom in 2019

Gayoom's health has been a concern in recent years, particularly during his time in jail. He had been diagnosed with Benign Paroxysmal Positional Vertigo (BPPV). On 13 September 2018, his health deteriorated while he was incarcerated, leading to a visit to the doctor at Maafushi Jail for treatment. The attending physician recommended that Gayoom be placed under house arrest due to difficulties in performing essential activities. An ENT doctor advised him to avoid moving his head to prevent further complications due to BPPV. Medical professionals indicated that his health could worsen at any moment, underscoring the seriousness of his condition during his imprisonment. In August 2020, Gayoom tested positive for COVID-19. He has remained in good health thereafter.

=== Other activities ===
An avid reader, Gayoom is known for his deep engagement with literature, particularly in the areas of religion, science, and history during his post-presidency. His fascination with astronomy has been a notable aspect of his personal interests, and he has spent remarkable time studying the moon and celestial bodies. His passion for photography and calligraphy also stands out, with Gayoom being a skilled calligrapher known for his work in Arabic script. His calligraphic works has been displayed at the Islamic Centre since 1984. Gayoom is also a poet and writer.

Gayoom is an enthusiastic sportsman, with a particular interest in badminton and cricket. He actively played both sports during his presidency and beyond, maintaining a strong connection to physical activity. His role as an Islamic scholar further complements his diverse range of interests, as he often engages in discussions and lectures on religious matters during his free time.

Gayoom's interest in astronomy began during his time teaching in Nigeria in 1969. The clear night skies allowed him to notice that the moon's setting direction shifted over the course of the month, contrary to his assumption that it followed a constant path. This observation led him to consult small astronomy books, which provided a basic understanding but left him aware of the limitations of the information available.

=== Religion ===
I speak today as a Muslim, and as the leader of a Muslim country, I am deeply concerned, as I am sure all of you are, over the state of world affairs and the increasing polarisation between Islam and the West. A growing number of people in the West believe, quite wrongly, that Islam is inherently a religion of violence, misogyny and tyranny, and that Muslims are out to subvert their way of life. Equally, a rising number of Muslims believe, also quite wrongly, that Islam justifies violence, misogyny and tyranny, and that the West is out to destroy the very religion of Islam. Both groups view each other with deep suspicion and fear, and with contempt and hatred as well. But, one thing is common to all caught up in this vicious cycle: ignorance of each other. And that, I think, is the biggest tragedy.

— Maumoon Abdul Gayoom, 2007

Gayoom is a Sunni Muslim. The constitution of the Maldives states all Maldivian citizens shall be Sunni Muslim. Many people accuse Gayoom of not being a Sunni Muslim, but rather a Shia Muslim, or of not being a Muslim by faith.

During the 2008 Maldivian presidential election, the Adhaalath Party challenged Gayoom in the Supreme Court as a constitutional matter, citing his past statements that could suggest he was not a Sunni Muslim, which would disqualify him from running for president under the constitutional requirement that the president must be a Sunni Muslim. The Supreme Court, upon dismissing the case, stated that the Adhaalath Party had failed to provide sufficient evidence to determine that Gayoom was not a Sunni Muslim.

== Awards and honours ==
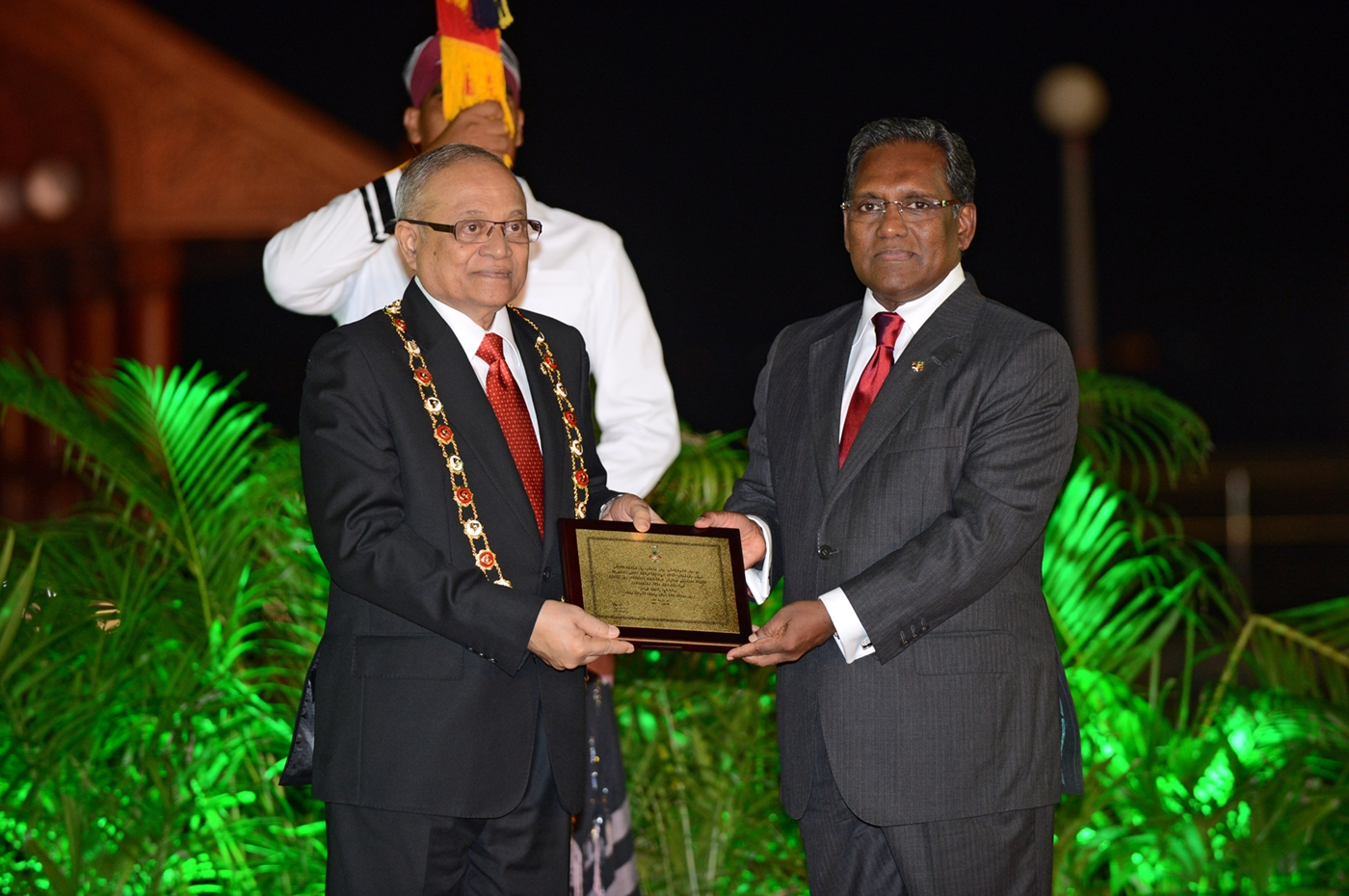
Gayoom receiving the Order of the Rule of Ghazi from Mohamed Waheed Hassan, 2013

Gayoom received several notable awards and honours throughout his career. In 1988, he was included in the Global 500 Roll of Honour by the United Nations Environment Programme. He was presented with the Man of the Sea Award for 1990 by the Lega Navale Italiana in 1991 and the International Environment Award by Deutsche Gesellschaft für Internationale Zusammenarbeit in 1998. Gayoom also received The Energy and Resources Institute's Sustainable Development Leadership Award in 2008.

In recognition of his contributions to international relations, Gayoom was awarded the Grand Order of Mugunghwa by South Korean president Chun Doo-hwan in 1984, and in 1997, Queen Elizabeth II conferred upon him the title of Knight Grand Cross of St Michael and St George. His efforts in public health were acknowledged with the WHO Health-for-All Gold Medal in 1998.

Other notable accolades include the Shield of Al-Azhar University in 2002, the Sri Lanka Mitra Vibhushana in 2008, and the Order of the Distinguished Rule of Ghazi, the highest state honour awarded by the Maldives, awarded to him in 2013. In 2015, Gayoom was awarded the Golden Jubilee Shield of Honour by the State for his exceptional national service in safeguarding, defending, and strengthening the full independence of the Maldives over the preceding 50 years. In 2022, Gayoom was awarded the President's Tourism Gold Award. He received lifetime achievement the same year. In 2025, Gayoom received a special commemorative shield in recognition of his "commendable work" to prevent the 1988 attack to overthrow his government, which was acknowledged at the national level.

== See also ==
- Mohamed Amin Didi
- Fathulla Jameel
- List of presidents of the Maldives
- Vice President of the Maldives
- Cabinet of the Maldives

== Works cited ==
- Ellis, Royston (1998). A Man for All Islands – President Gayoom of the Maldives. Times Editions. p. 256. ISBN 9812048529.
- Riyaz, Ibrahim (2018). "Ancestor Report – Maumoon Abdul Qayyoom". Feydhoo Roots. Archived from the original on 26 November 2024.
- Murithi, Tim (2013). Handbook of Africa's International Relations. Taylor & Francis. p. 512. ISBN 9781136636967.
- Pence, Romney (2020). "Presidential Electoral history of President Maumoon Abdul Gayoom". Maldives Archives.
- Shafeeu, Ali (2021). The Rise and Fall of Maumoon Abdul Gayoom, the most famous person in history of the Maldives. p. 101.
- A. Mihdha (2008). "The political economy of development: The case of the tourism industry in the Maldives" (PDF). maldivesresearch.org. Archived (PDF) from the original on 23 December 2015.
- Shiraz, Ahmed (May 2014). "Protests, crises & coups against Maumoon A. Gayoom". Maldives Archives.
- Töpfer, Klaus (2005). Maldives Post-Tsunami Environmental Assessment. United Nations Environment Programme. ISBN 9280725793.
- Ibrahim, Shihad (2014). "Invaluable Servant of the Century: Maumoon Abdul Gayoom". shihadibrahim.com (in Divehi). Archived from the original on 22 April 2017.
- Adam, Ibrahim (30 March 2020). "Do you know President Maumoon's real name?". Dhiyares (in Divehi).
- Shareef, Shaniha (24 January 2025). "Maumoon explains why the planets lined up after hundreds of years". Sun.mv.
- Abdul Gayoom, Maumoon (16 November 2000). "Interview with the president". Adduvas Magazine (Interview).

Political offices
Preceded by Ibrahim Nasir	President of the Maldives; 1978–2008	Succeeded by Mohamed Nasheed
Preceded by Hassan Zareer	Minister of Transport; 1977–1979	Succeeded by Hassan Zareer
Preceded by Hassan Zareer	Deputy Minister of Transport; 1976	Succeeded by Hassan Zareer
Preceded by Mohamed Nooraddin	Minister of Finance; 1989–1993	Succeeded by Himself as minister of finance and treasury
Preceded by Himself	Minister of Finance and Treasury; 1993–2004	Succeeded by Arif Hilmy
Preceded by Office established	Minister of Defence; 1993–2004	Succeeded by Ismail Shafeeu
Preceded by Office established	Governor of the Maldives Monetary Authority; 1981–2004	Succeeded by Mohamed Jaleel
Diplomatic posts
Preceded by	Deputy Ambassador of the Maldives to Sri Lanka; 1975–1976	Succeeded by
Preceded by Abdul Sattar Moosa Didi	Permanent Representative of the Maldives to the United Nations; 1976–1977	Succeeded by Fathulla Jameel
Preceded by Benazir Bhutto	Chairperson of SAARC; 1990	Succeeded by Ranasinghe Premadasa
Preceded by P V Narasimha Rao	Chairperson of SAARC; 1997	Succeeded by Chandrika Kumaratunga
