= Mohamed Ghassan Maumoon =

Maldivian politician (born 1980)

- މުޙައްމަދު ޣައްސާން މައުމޫން
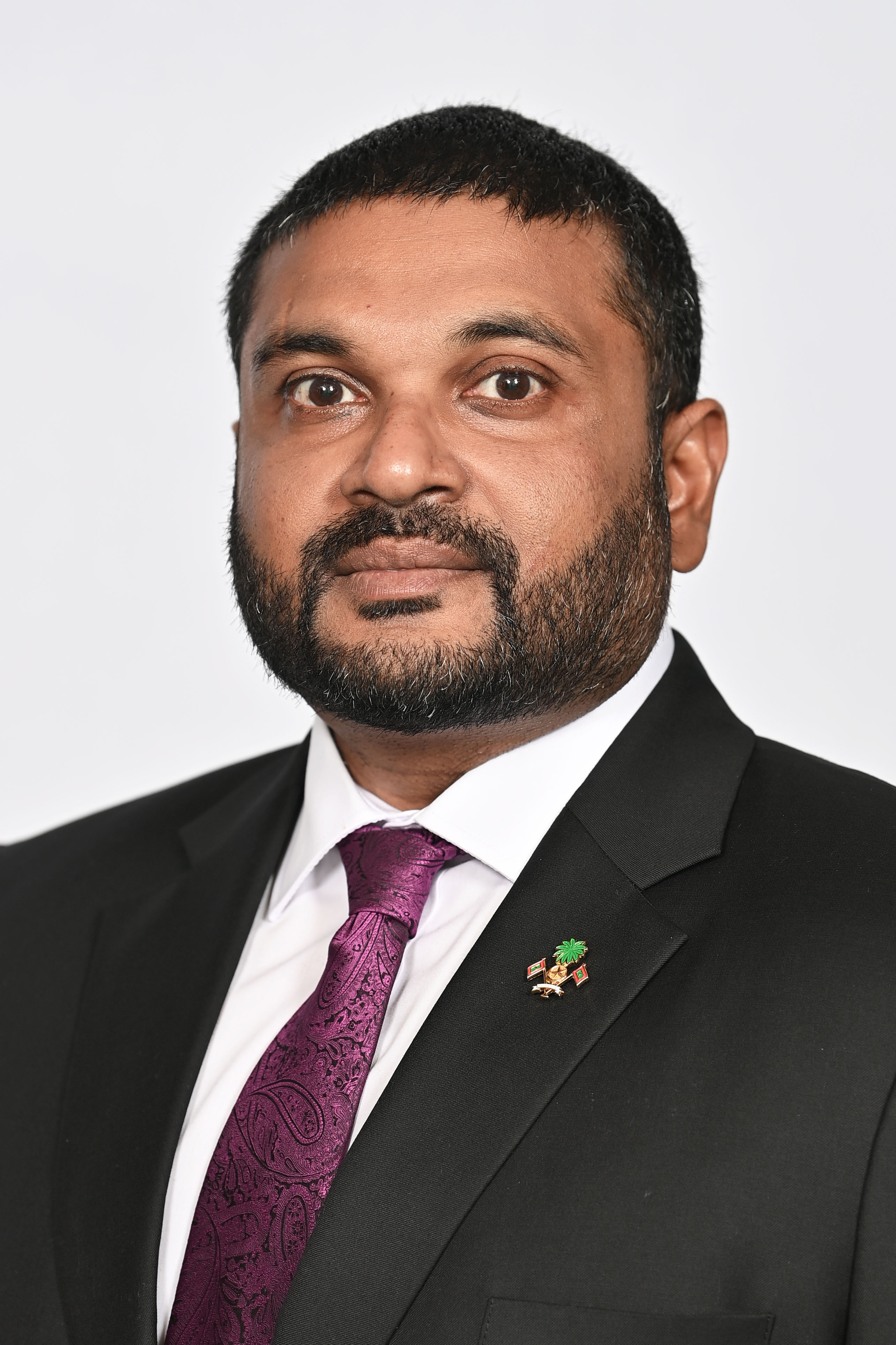

Minister of Defence
- In office 17 November 2023 – 14 April 2026
- President: Mohamed Muizzu
- Preceded by: Mariya Ahmed Didi

Member of the People's Majlis
- In office 29 May 2019 – 17 November 2023
- Preceded by: Ibrahim Riza
- Succeeded by: Hanan Mohamed Rasheed
- Constituency: Guraidhoo

Minister of State for Social Affairs
- In office 10 January 2016 – 2018
- President: Abdulla Yameen
- Preceded by: Position created
- Succeeded by: Position abolished

State Minister at The President's Office
- In office 2015 – 10 January 2016
- President: Abdulla Yameen
- Preceded by: Position created
- Succeeded by: Position abolished

Minister of State for Youth and Sports
- In office January 2014 – 2015
- President: Abdulla Yameen
- Preceded by: Position created
- Succeeded by: Position abolished

Minister of State for Human Resources, Youth and Sports
- In office 2012 – January 2014
- President: Mohamed Waheed Hassan
- Preceded by: Position created
- Succeeded by: Himself as Minister of State for Youth and Sports

Personal details
- Born: 20 June 1980 (age 46) Machchangolhi, Malé, Maldives
- Party: People's National Congress (2025–present)
- Other political affiliations: Progressive Party of Maldives (until 2025)
- Relations: Gayoom family
- Parent(s): Maumoon Abdul Gayoom; Nasreena Ibrahim
- Education: King's College London

Mohamed Ghassan Maumoon (Dhivehi: މުޙައްމަދު ޣައްސާން މައުމޫން; born 20 June 1980) is a Maldivian politician who served as the Minister of Defence of the Maldives from 2023 to 2026. He has held many ministerial positions in past administrations of the Maldivian government. He was a Member of the People's Majlis for the Guraidhoo constituency. He served as vice president of the Progressive Party of Maldives from 2019 until its dissolution in 2025. He's been serving as the vice president of the People's National Congress since 2025.

== Education ==
Ghassan studied Molecular Biology & Biomedical Sciences Research at King's College London.

== Career ==
Ghassan has held many positions in the government. His first ministerial position was as State Minister for Human Resources, Youth and Sports during the presidency of Mohamed Waheed Hassan Manik. Later during the presidency of his uncle, Abdulla Yameen Abdul Gayoom, he was the State Minister for Youth and Sports. He was then later the State Minister at The President's Office and then the Minister of State for Social Affairs. He was also the Member of parliament of the 19th Session of the People's Majlis for the Guraidhoo Constituency.

He was appointed as the Minister of Defence in November 2023 by President Mohamed Muizzu. On 14 April 2026, he resigned en masse with other ministers.

== Personal life ==
Ghassan is the son and youngest child of the former president, Maumoon Abdul Gayoom and former first lady, Nasreena Ibrahim. His father was the longest serving president of the Maldives. Nasreena Ibrahim was the only first lady to give birth while in post. He was born in Machchangolhi, in Malé.
