= Nasreena Ibrahim =

First Lady of the Maldives from 1978 to 2008

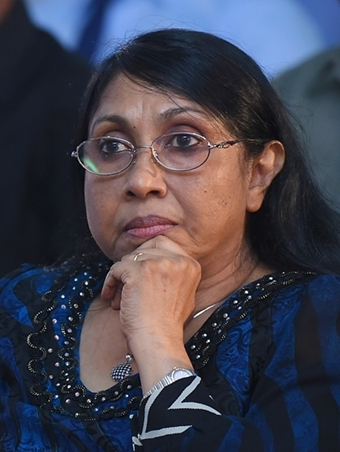
- Ibrahim in 2015

4th First Lady of the Maldives
- In role 11 November 1978 – 11 November 2008
- President: Maumoon Abdul Gayoom
- Preceded by: Naseema Mohamed
- Succeeded by: Laila Ali Abdulla

Personal details
- Born: 20 December 1950 (age 75) Malé, Maldive Islands
- Party: Independent
- Spouse: Maumoon Abdul Gayoom (m. 1969)
- Children: Dunya; Yumna; Faris; Ghassan

Nasreena Ibrahim (born 20 December 1950) is a Maldivian activist who was the first lady of the Maldives from 1978 to 2008, as the wife of president Maumoon Abdul Gayoom. She is the longest tenured first lady in history of the Maldives.

Raised in Malé, Nasreena studied from Cairo, Egypt, where she also met her future husband Maumoon Abdul Gayoom, and married in Cairo. The following year, she gave birth to twins, Dunya and Yumna, followed by Faris, and Ghassan, who was born during her tenure as first lady.

During her time as First Lady, Nasreena made public appearances but remained uninvolved in politics and never gave a speech or interview. Her only public statement was during an interview with Royston Ellis, where she discussed her husband Abdul Gayoom's life for his biography, A Man for All Islands. Ibrahim was one of the founding members of the Society for Health Education.

== Early life ==
Nasreena Ibrahim was born in 1950 in Malé, Maldive Islands (present-day Maldives).
