= Progressive Party of Maldives =

Political party in the Maldives from 2011 to 2025

Progressive Party of Maldives ޕްރޮގްރެސިވް ޕާރޓީ އޮފް މޯލްޑިވްސް
- Abbreviation: PPM
- President: Mohamed Muizzu
- Secretary-General: Ibrahim Abdul Razzaq
- Vice presidents: Abdulla Khaleel; Ahmed Shiyam; Mohamed Ghassan Maumoon
- Founder: Maumoon Abdul Gayoom and Ahmed Faris Maumoon
- Founded: 27 October 2011
- Dissolved: 30 January 2025
- Split from: Dhivehi Rayyithunge Party
- Merged into: People's National Congress
- Headquarters: Maafannu, Seatrack Building, 7th Floor, Malé, Maldives
- Membership (December 2024): 12,174
- Ideology: Islamism; Social conservatism Maldivian nationalism Right-wing populism
- Political position: Centre-right to right-wing
- Religion: Sunni Islam
- European affiliation: European Conservatives and Reformists Party (regional partner, until 2022)
- Colors: Pink

Website
- www.ppm.mv

The Progressive Party of Maldives (Dhivehi: ޕްރޮގްރެސިވް ޕާރޓީ އޮފް މޯލްޑިވްސް, PPM), was a political party in the Maldives. The stated goal of the party was driving Maldives towards an independent and democratic, safe and secure, high income, high human capital, developed nation state with a diversified and robust economy whilst preserving its Islamic heritage.

== History ==
=== 2011–2012 ===
The party was formed by Maumoon Abdul Gayoom in 2011 after resigning from his first party, Dhivehi Rayyithunge Party (DRP), citing corruption of views after new leadership. The political party first emerged from a faction of DRP, named Z-DRP, which was formed by Gayyoom in early 2011. This occurred after in-party disputes between Gayyoom, who was serving as the party's retired "Supreme Leader", and the then leader, Ahmed Thasmeen Ali.

On 4 September 2011, Gayyoom handed in his resignation from the DRP announcing that the Z-DRP faction of the party, would become a new party independent from the DRP. The very next day, he unveiled the plans for the "Progressive Party of Maldives".

On 8 October 2011, the proposed party was granted license from the Elections Commission to go ahead; giving the party a time frame of 9 months to register itself with the government.

In August 2012, PPM accused the Maldivian Democratic Party (MDP, the main opposition party) of pressuring the United Nations Human Rights Committee, and called the 2012 Maldives report of the UN organ "serious and concerning", alleging that the UN called to allow same-sex rights and religious freedom in the Maldives.

=== 2013–2018 (ruling party) ===
On 17 November 2013, PPM became the ruling party of Maldives after its candidate Abdulla Yameen (Maumoon's half-brother) won the 2013 Maldivian Presidential Election, defeating MDP Candidate Mohamed Nasheed in the runoff.

In 2014, PPM took majority of the People's Majlis after winning 33 seats in the parliamentary election of 2014, while coalition partners Jumhooree Party (JP) won 15 seats and Maldives Development Alliance (MDA) taking 5 seats.

In 2015, both JP and religiously conservative Adhaalath Party had left the Government coalition.

In 2018, incumbent President Abdulla Yameen lost the elections to opposition candidate Ibrahim Mohamed Solih.

=== 2018–2025 ===
==== Party split and coalition with PNC ====
Due to a leadership dispute between former President Abdulla Yameen, and Maumoon Abdul Gayoom, and due to fears of loss of leadership, the party leadership split the party into two separate parties, a new party called People's National Congress (PNC), and PPM. The party won the case. PPM and PNC formed an opposition alliance called the Progressive Congress Coalition.

In the April 2019 parliamentary election PPM lost heavily. The Maldivian Democratic Party (MDP) of president Ibrahim Mohamed Solih won a landslide victory. It took 65 of 87 seats of the parliament.

Former president and leader of the party Abdulla Yameen was sentenced to five years in prison in November 2019 for money laundering. The High Court upheld the jail sentence in January 2021. The case was overturned by the Supreme Court of Maldives on 30 November 2021. However, the Maldives Criminal Court sentenced 11 years in prison and fined him $5 million for terrorism financing and the Supreme Court denied and rejected the decision to compete Abdulla Yameen to the elections.

Dr. Mohamed Muizzu, mayor of Malé City, decided to compete to the Elections on the behalf of People's National Congress. On 30 September 2023, Muizzu won the second-round runoff of the Maldives presidential election, beating incumbent president, Ibrahim Mohamed Solih, with 54% of the vote.

==== Yameen-Muizzu Conflict ====
The internal strife within the PPM-PNC coalition reached a breaking point on Thursday, barely a week into incumbent President Mohamed Muizzu’s term. The faction aligned with former President Abdulla Yameen Abdul Gayoom is now calling for the incumbent's resignation. On Thursday night, Yameen stepped down from his role as the leader of the PPM and revealed intentions to exit the party, signaling his intention to establish a new political entity named "People's National Front".

The proprietor of the building that presently accommodates the primary political hub of PPM has instructed the party to evacuate the premises. The PPM conducted its political activities at H. Hurafa. This directive comes at a juncture when both the party leadership and its former head, Former President Abdulla Yameen, have parted ways with the party.

Incumbent Vice President Hussain Mohamed Latheef reiterated his steadfast support for President Dr. Mohamed Muizzu on Saturday, underscoring his commitment to stand alongside the President in ensuring that the new presidential term yields benefits for the Maldivian people.

==== Dissolution ====
On 2 December 2024, PPM's Senate passed a resolution in an emergency meeting to dissolve the party. During the senate meeting, all 42 members unanimously agreed to dissolve the party. There also had been many attempts to dissolve PPM and change all members to PNC. The Elections Commission later began the process of dissolving the party on 19 December. On 30 January 2025, the Elections Commission officially dissolved the party.

== Electoral history ==
=== President elections ===
Election	Party candidate	Running mate	Votes	%	Votes	%	Result
Election	Party candidate	Running mate	First Round		Second Round		Result
2013	Abdulla Yameen	Mohamed Jameel Ahmed	53,099	25.35%	—N/a		Annulled ✗
2013	Abdulla Yameen	Mohamed Jameel Ahmed	61,278	29.72%	111,203	51.39%	Elected ✓
2018	Abdulla Yameen	Mohamed Shaheem	96,132	41.62%	—N/a		Lost ✗
2023	Mohamed Muizzu	Hussain Mohamed Latheef	101,635	46.06	129,159	54.04	Elected ✓

=== People's Majlis elections ===
Election	Party Leader	Votes	%	Seats	+/–	Position
2014	Maumoon Abdul Gayoom	51,424	27.72%	33 / 85	New	1st
2019	Abdulla Yameen	19,176	9.12%	5 / 87	▼28	▼3rd
2024	Mohamed Muizzu	0	0	0 / 93	▼5	▼ Didn't contest

== See also ==
- List of Islamic political parties
