= Dhivehi Rayyithunge Party =

Political party in the Maldives from 2005 to 2023

Dhivehi Rayyithunge Party ދިވެހި ރައްޔިތުންގެ ޕާޓީ
- Leader: Abdulla Jabir
- Founded: 21 July 2005
- Dissolved: 15 March 2023
- Headquarters: Malé, Maldives
- Ideology: Conservatism; Populism; Islamic democracy Nationalism; Reformism
- Political position: Centre-right to right-wing

Website
- drp.mv (archived)

The Dhivehi Rayyithunge Party (Dhivehi: ދިވެހި ރައްޔިތުންގެ ޕާޓީ, lit. 'Maldivian People's Party'; DRP) was a political party of the Maldives. On 2 June 2005, the nation's 50-member parliament voted unanimously to allow and operate political parties in Maldives. DRP subsequently submitted its registration on 21 July 2005 and was the second registered political party in the Republic of Maldives.

In early 2023, the Elections Commission (EC) issued a decision to dissolve the DRP, as the party failed to maintain a minimum of 3,000 members as mandated by law.

== History ==
=== Maumoon Abdul Gayoom (2005–2010) ===
On 2 June 2005, the nation's 50-member parliament voted unanimously to allow and operate political parties in the Maldives. DRP subsequently submitted its registration on 21 July 2005 and was the second registered political party in the Second Republic of Maldives.

At the first multi-party parliamentary elections in the Maldives on 9 May 2009, the DRP won 36% of the seats (28 out of 77 seats) in the parliament, becoming the party to win the most seats. However, DRP gained the second most votes with 27.5% of the votes (39,399 votes) compared with the 35.3% of votes (50,562 votes) gained by the Maldivian Democratic Party (MDP).

=== Ahmed Thasmeen Ali (2010–2013) ===
In 2011, the first leader of the party, former president Maumoon Abdul Gayoom removed himself from the party amid contentious conflicts of interest within the party and political competitiveness. He formed a new political party called the Progressive Party of Maldives (PPM). It was a point where DRP had a huge debt following the defeat in the 2008 Presidential Elections with Ahmed Thasmeen Ali as the running mate of Gayoom. Once Gayoom left, the party was led by Ahmed Thasmeen Ali who had to face the inherited debt of Rf. 32,000,000. This was the biggest challenge for him as the leader of the party. Following the defeat in the first round of Presidential Elections 2013, Thasmeen Ali being the running mate of former president Mohamed Waheed Hassan, DRP decided to support MDP in the second round of the elections, disappointing a lot of members of the party. MDP was defeated in the second round by PPM. Ahmed Thasmeen Ali then decided to join MDP, leaving DRP in the hands of the current leader Mohamed Nasheed (Colonel), who courageously took up the place of duty, when two leaders on two occasions, had left the party to perish. Taking up the leadership, Mohamed Nasheed promised reform and recovery in many aspects of the party. He had stated that the party was in ICU at the moment, as audited and unaudited debt of the party would round up to a figure as big as 10 Million Rufiyaa.

=== Mohamed Nasheed (Colonel) (2013–2019) ===
New proposed logo of DRP

The then leader of DRP was Abdulla Jabir. He became the leader of the Party on 18 November 2013, after receiving a majority of the votes at the 142nd council meeting. After Jabir was elected leader, Nasheed became the deputy leader.

Soon after taking up the leadership, Mohamed Nasheed, as a determined leader, announced a logo contest open for all, to change the logo of the party. It was part of the re-branding and reforming of DRP. The logo to win the 1st place was “Rising Star” designed by Modern Arts. The logo was inspired from a verse of a poem by Mohamed Jameel Didi who was a famous poet and a political figure of the Maldives.

== Party objectives ==
According to the party's literature, the objectives of DRP are:

- Strengthening and protecting the existing bonds of Islamic unity.
- Grooming a new generation of well-disciplined and talented youths who will carry the mantle of national progress, in the years ahead.
- Upholding justice.
- Modeling the Maldivian society to reflect the aspirations of the people.
- Protecting the Maldives from detrimental external influences.
- Facilitating easy access to basic services such as housing, education and healthcare for every citizen.
- Introducing a new generation of youthful leaders with the vision to fashion domestic affairs in an atmosphere of peace and harmony.
- Creating a service-oriented population working steadfastly to promote the well being of the people.

== Election results ==
=== President ===
Year	Candidate		1st Round		2nd Round		Result
Year	President	Vice President	Votes	Vote %	Votes	Vote %	Result
2008	Maumoon Abdul Gayoom	Ahmed Thasmeen Ali	71,779	40.34	82,121	45.32	Lost
2013	Mohamed Waheed Hassan	Ahmed Thasmeen Ali	10,750	5.13	N/A		Annulled
2013	Did not contest in re-run						
2018	Did not contest						

=== People's Majlis ===
Year	Party Leader	Votes	Vote %	Seats	Notes
2005	none	71,558	32.29	20 / 42	Ran as independents supporting DRP
2009	Maumoon Abdul Gayoom	40,886	24.62	26 / 77	
2014	Colonel Mohamed Nasheed	549	0.30	0 / 85	

== See also ==
- List of Islamic political parties
