= Abdul Raheem Abdul Latheef =

Maldivian soldier (born 1964)

Lieutenant General (Rtd) Abdul Raheem Abdul Latheef
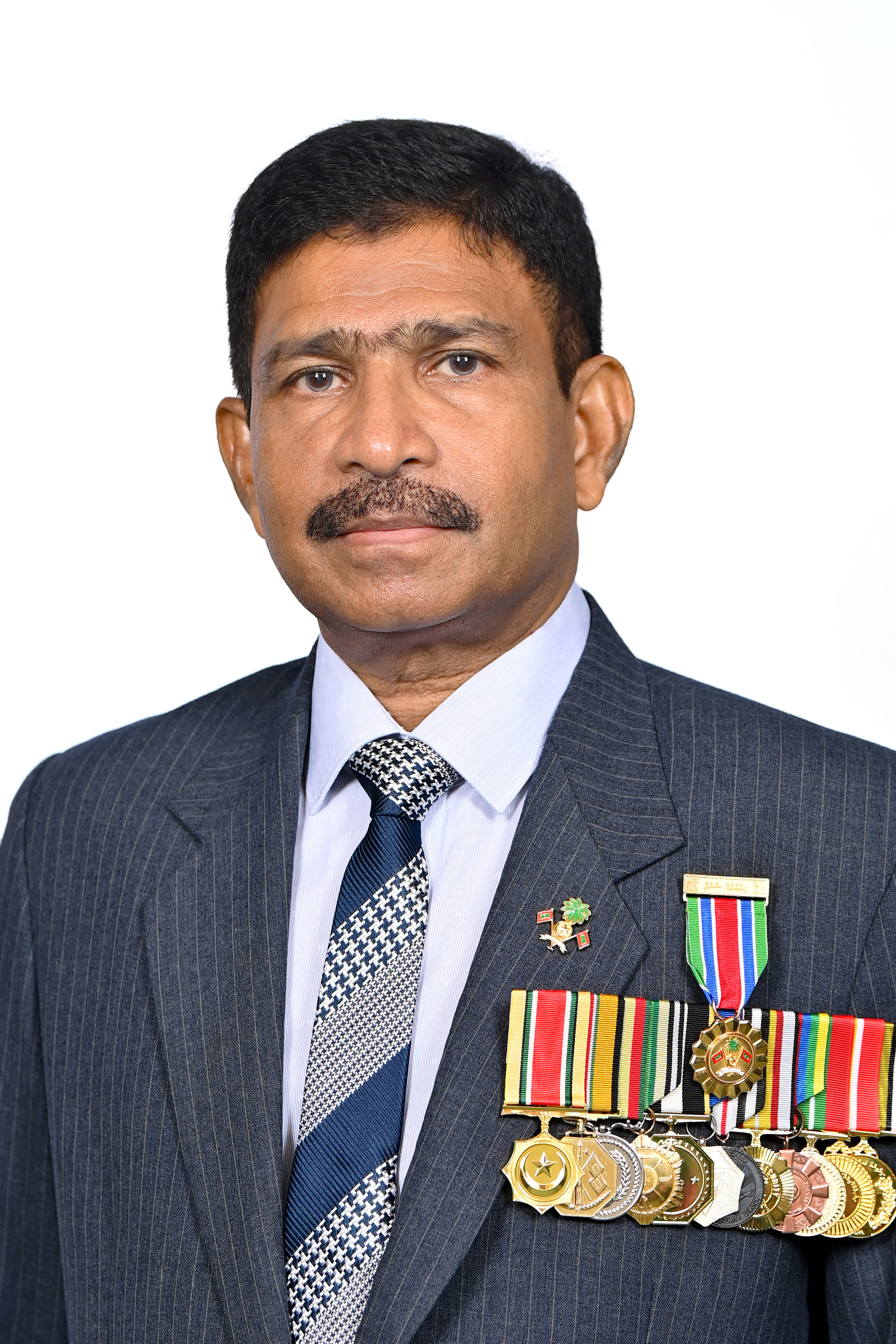
- Official portrait, 2024

Ambassador of the Maldives to Turkey
- Incumbent
- Assumed office 3 July 2024
- Appointed by: Mohamed Muizzu

Chief of Defence Force
- In office 17 November 2023 – 17 April 2024
- Appointed by: Mohamed Muizzu
- Deputy: Ibrahim Hilmy
- Preceded by: Abdulla Shamaal
- Succeeded by: Ibrahim Hilmy

Vice Chief of Defence Force
- In office 12 December 2018 – 17 November 2023
- Appointed by: Ibrahim Mohamed Solih
- Preceded by: Ahmed Shahid
- Succeeded by: Ibrahim Hilmy

Personal details
- Born: 17 April 1964 (age 62) Galolhu, Malé, Maldives
- Children: 1
- Education: Asia-Pacific Center for Security Studies; Majeediyya School

Military service
- Allegiance: Maldives
- Branch/service: Maldives National Defence Force
- Years of service: 39
- Battles/wars: 1988 Maldives coup attempt

Lieutenant General (Rtd) Abdul Raheem Abdul Latheef (born 17 April 1964) is a Maldivian diplomat and retired officer of the Maldives National Defence Force (MNDF) who served as the Chief of Defence Force (CDF). He retired on 17 April 2024.

== Career ==
He has had many appointments during his time in the MNDF. Notables include Acting Commandant of Service Corps, Spokesperson for Maldives National Defence Force, Vice Chairperson of MNDF Welfare Governing Board, Chairperson of the Grievance Board, etc.

He was serving as vice chief of the MNDF since 11 December 2018. Latheef was appointed as the Chief of Defence Force, of Maldives National Defence Force (MNDF) on 17 November 2023. He later had to retire on 17 April 2024 as he reached the age of retirement according to the military act.

After he retired he later became the Minister of State of Foreign Affairs.

On 3 July 2024, he was appointed by Maldivian President Mohamed Muizzu as the first Ambassador of the Maldives to Turkey.

On 24 February 2025, president Mohamed Muizzu sought approval from the People's Majlis to appoint Latheef as the non-resident ambassador of Maldives to Russia. On 3 March 2025, the People's Majlis later approved it.

== Awards ==
He had received the following awards:

- Presidential Medal
- Distinguished Service Medal
- Dedicated Service Medal
- Defence Force Service Medal
- Good Conduct Medal
- 3rd November Medal
- Centenary Medal
- Ribbon for Skill
- Achievement Ribbon
- Special Service Ribbon
- Good Conduct Ribbon
- Defence Force Service Ribbon
- Dedicated Service Ribbon
- Long Service Ribbon
- Presidential Ribbon

== Early life ==
Latheef was born on 17 April 1964 in Galolhu, Malé, Maldives. He graduated from Majeediyya School. He was a prefect, a house captain at the school as well as a Regimental Sergeant Major of the School Cadet Corps.

== Education ==
He is an alumnus of the Asia-Pacific Center for Security Studies where he completed the Advanced Security Cooperation course.

== Family life ==
He is currently married and has one son from the marriage.
