= Ahmed Shiyam (major general) =

Maldivian Army general

Major General Ahmed Shiyam
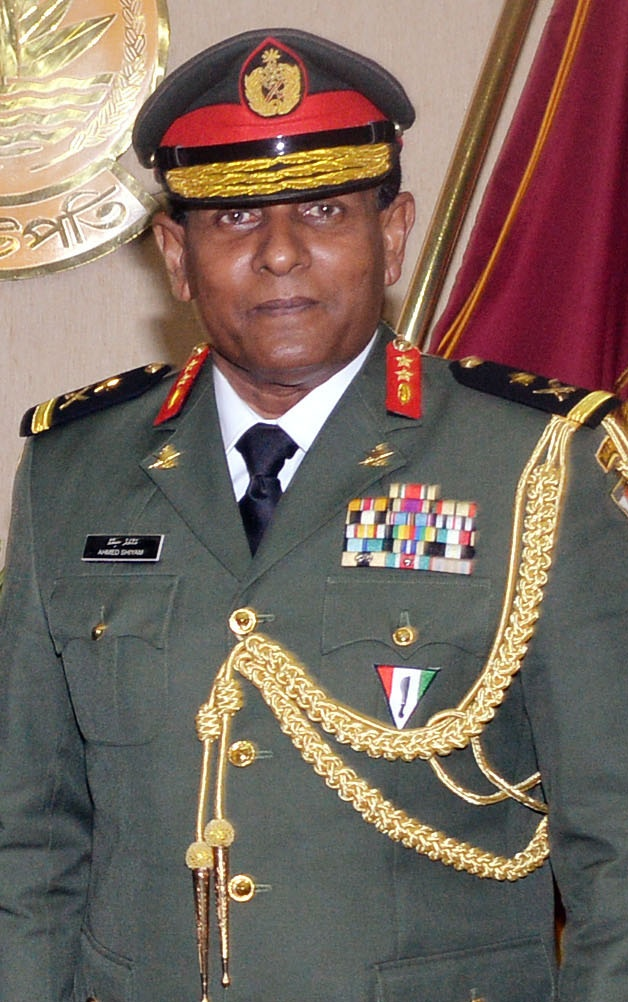
- Major General Ahmed Shiyam in 2015
- Born: Malé, Maldives
- Military career
- Allegiance: Maldives
- Branch: Maldives National Defence Force
- Rank: Major General
- Commands: Chief of Defence Force; Commandant Coast Guard; Commandant Central Area; Commandant Marine Corps; Commandant Training Facility; Commandant Defence Institute for Training and Education; Commanding Officer - Northern Regional HQ; Commanding Officer - Southern Regional HQ; Commanding Officer - Regional HQ Hulhule'; Commanding Officer - Electrical and Mechanical Engineers; Commanding Officer Support Battalion II; Commanding Officer Rapid Reaction Forces
- Conflicts: 1988 Maldives coup attempt
- Awards: Distinguished Service Medal; Presidential Medal; 3 November Medal; Defence Force Service Medal; Dedicated Service Medal; Good Conduct Medal; Centenary Medal

Major General (Retd) Ahmed Shiyam was serving as the Chief of Defence Force of the Maldives National Defence Force. He was appointed to this post on 9 February 2012.

== Military career and training ==
Shiyam joined the Maldivian National Defence Force on 16 September 1986 and is a graduate of the Royal Military Academy, Sandhurst, UK. After graduating from Royal Military Academy, General Shiyam began his career as an instructor in the Girifushi Training Center. General Shiyam was instrumental in bringing about a major change in the training philosophy of the MNDF, and is responsible for most of the present day institutional training of the MNDF. He spent most of his early career in the Training Unit of the MNDF, eventually being promoted to Commanding Officer of the Unit and Commandant of the training facility.

He is a graduate of the prestigious National Defence College of India, and completed his Infantry Officer Advance Course at Fort Benning, USA and is the first Maldivian graduate from the Command and Staff College in Quetta, Pakistan. General Shiyam has also completed many executive level courses such as the Executive Course from Asia-Pacific Center for Security Studies and Near East South Asia Center for Strategic Studies. He has also actively participated in senior leadership level seminars and workshops like PASOLS and PASOC, while facilitating and hosting many joint training exercises of MNDF with foreign militaries.

== Commands held ==
Prior to being appointed as the Chief of Defence force, Major General Shiyam was appointed as the 2nd Commandant of MNDF Coast Guard on 1 September 2011. Prior to this, General Shiyam held the appointment of Commander of MNDF Central Area. General Shiyam has the honour of being the first Commandant of the MNDF Marine Corps on its inception on 15 March 2009. His previous other Command and Staff appointments include Commandant, Training Facility and Commanding Officer - Defence Institute for Training and Education, Commanding Officer - Northern Regional Headquarters, Commanding Officer – Southern Regional Headquarters, Commanding Officer - Regional Headquarters Hulhule’, Executive Officer for both the Chief of Defence Force and the Minister of Defence, Commanding Officer - Electrical and Mechanical Engineers, Commanding Officer - Support Battalion II and Commander - Rapid Reaction Forces.

== Military decorations ==
Service Medal decorations

- The Distinguished Service Medal
- The Presidential Medal
- The 3 November Medal
- The Defence Force Service Medal
- The Dedicated Service Medal
- The Good Conduct Medal
- The Centenary Medal

== Family ==
Major General Shiyam is married and has two daughters and two sons.

Preceded by Moosa Ali Jaleel	Chief of Defence Force (Maldives); 2012- 2019	Succeeded by Abdulla Shamaal
