= Ministry of Defence and National Service (Maldives) =

Government ministry of the Maldives

- ދިފާޢީ އަދި ވަޠަނީ ޚިދުމަތާ ބެހޭ ވުޒާރާ Dhifaa’ee adhi Vathanee Khidhumathaa Behey Vuzaaraa

Agency overview
- Formed: 1932
- Jurisdiction: Government of the Maldives
- Headquarters: Ministry of Defence
- Annual budget: $369K (MVR 5.7 Million) (2024)
- Minister responsible: Hassan Rasheed
- Deputy Ministers responsible: Fathimath Mizna Ali, Deputy Minister of Defence; Wais Waheed, MG (Retd), Director General of National Counter Terrorism Centre
- Agency executives: Major Gen. Ibrahim Hilmy, Chief of Defence Force; Muaz Haleem, Minister of State for Defence; Brig. Gen. Ahmed Ghiyas, Vice Chief of Defence Force; Command Sergeant Major Adnan Ali, Sergeant Major of MNDF
- Child agencies: Maldives National Defence Force; Aviation and Port Security Command; National Disaster Management Authority; Maldives Hydrographic Service; Department of Aviation Security Authority; National Counter Terrorism Centre
- Website: defence.gov.mv

The Ministry of Defence and National Security (Dhivehi: ދިފާޢީ އަދި ވަޠަނީ ޚިދުމަތާ ބެހޭ ވުޒާރާ, romanized: Dhifaa’ee adhi Vathanee Khidhumathaa Behey Vuzaaraa) is the Maldivian government agency responsible for protecting the independence and the integrity of the Maldivian citizenry.

The Maldivian Constitution says:

The primary object of the Military Service is to defend and protect the Republic, its territorial integrity, its Exclusive Economic Zone and the people.

ސިފައިންގެ ޚިދުމަތުގެ މައިގަނޑު މަޤްޞަދަކީ ދިވެހިރާއްޖޭގެ ޖުމްހޫރިއްޔާއާއި، ދިވެހިރާއްޖޭގެ ސަރަޙައްދާއި، ދިވެހިރާއްޖޭގެ ޚާއްޞަ އިޤްތިޞާދީ ސަރަޙައްދާއި، ރައްޔިތުން ރައްކާތެރިކޮށް ޙިމާޔަތް ކުރުމެވެ.

== Founding ==
In 1932, Muhammad Fareed Didi established the Maldives - Ministry of Defence during his first imperial rule.

The origin of the current security force can be traced from the initiatives of Sultan Ibrahim Nooraddeen Iskandhar who reigned from 1888 to 1892. The sultan was impressed by a group of young men practicing marching in step while they were at his palace to learn a traditional form of martial arts. The sultan gave his blessings to their new drill and facilitated their training. The group of men thereafter began to accompany the sultan on his ceremonial processions.

== Ministers ==
| No. | Portrait | Name (born-died) | Term | | | Political party | Government | Ref. |
| No. | Portrait | Name (born-died) | Took office | Left office | Time in office | Political party | Government | Ref. |
Minister of Defence and National Security
| 1 | Ismail Shafeeu | Ismail Shafeeu (born 1956) | 1 September 2004 | 12 November 2008 | 4 years, 72 days | ? | Maumoon | |
| 2 | Ameen Faisal | Ameen Faisal (born 1963) | 12 November 2008 | 29 June 2010 | 1 year, 229 days | MDP | Nasheed | |
| 2 | Ameen Faisal | Ameen Faisal (born 1963) | 7 July 2010 | 10 December 2010 | 156 days | MDP | Nasheed | |
| – | Uz. Mohamed Muizzu Adnan | Uz. Mohamed Muizzu Adnan; Acting | 10 December 2010 | 30 June 2011 | 202 days | ? | Nasheed | – |
| 3 | Thalhath Ibrahim Kaleyfaanu | Thalhath Ibrahim Kaleyfaanu | 30 June 2011 | 7 February 2012 | 222 days | ? | Nasheed | – |
| 4 | Mohamed Nazim | Colonel (Rtd.); Mohamed Nazim | 8 February 2012 | 20 January 2015 | 2 years, 347 days | ? | Waheed; Gayoom | – |
| 5 | Moosa Ali Jaleel | Major General (Rtd.); Moosa Ali Jaleel (born 1960) | 20 January 2015 | 14 October 2015 | 267 days | ? | Gayoom | – |
| 6 | Adam Shareef | Adam Shareef (born 1960) | 28 October 2015 | 17 November 2018 | 3 years, 20 days | PNC | Gayoom | |
Minister of Defence
| 7 | Mariya Ahmed Didi | Mariya Ahmed Didi (born 1962) | 17 November 2018 | 17 November 2023 | 5 years, 0 days | MDP | Solih | |
| 8 | Mohamed Ghassan Maumoon | Mohamed Ghassan Maumoon (born 1980) | 17 November 2023 | 14 April 2026 | 2 years, 148 days | PNC | Muizzu | |
Minister of Defence and National Service
| 9 | Hassan Rasheed | Hassan Rasheed | 15 April 2026 | Incumbent | 104 days | ? | Muizzu | |

== Agencies ==
=== Maldives Customs Service ===
Maldives Customs Service (MSC) was established as a separate legal entity independent of the civil service under the Maldives Customs Act, which was confirmed on 11 May 2011. The main responsibility of the organization is to carry out all necessary activities related to customs in relation to the import and export of goods from Maldives and maintain all related accounts.

== See also ==
- Cabinet of the Maldives
- Maldives National Defence Force
- Ministry of Homeland Security and Technology
- MNDF Coast Guard
- MNDF Marine Corps
- MNDF Special Forces
