= Mohamed Nazim =

Maldivian politician (born 1969)

- މުޙައްމަދު ނާޡިމް
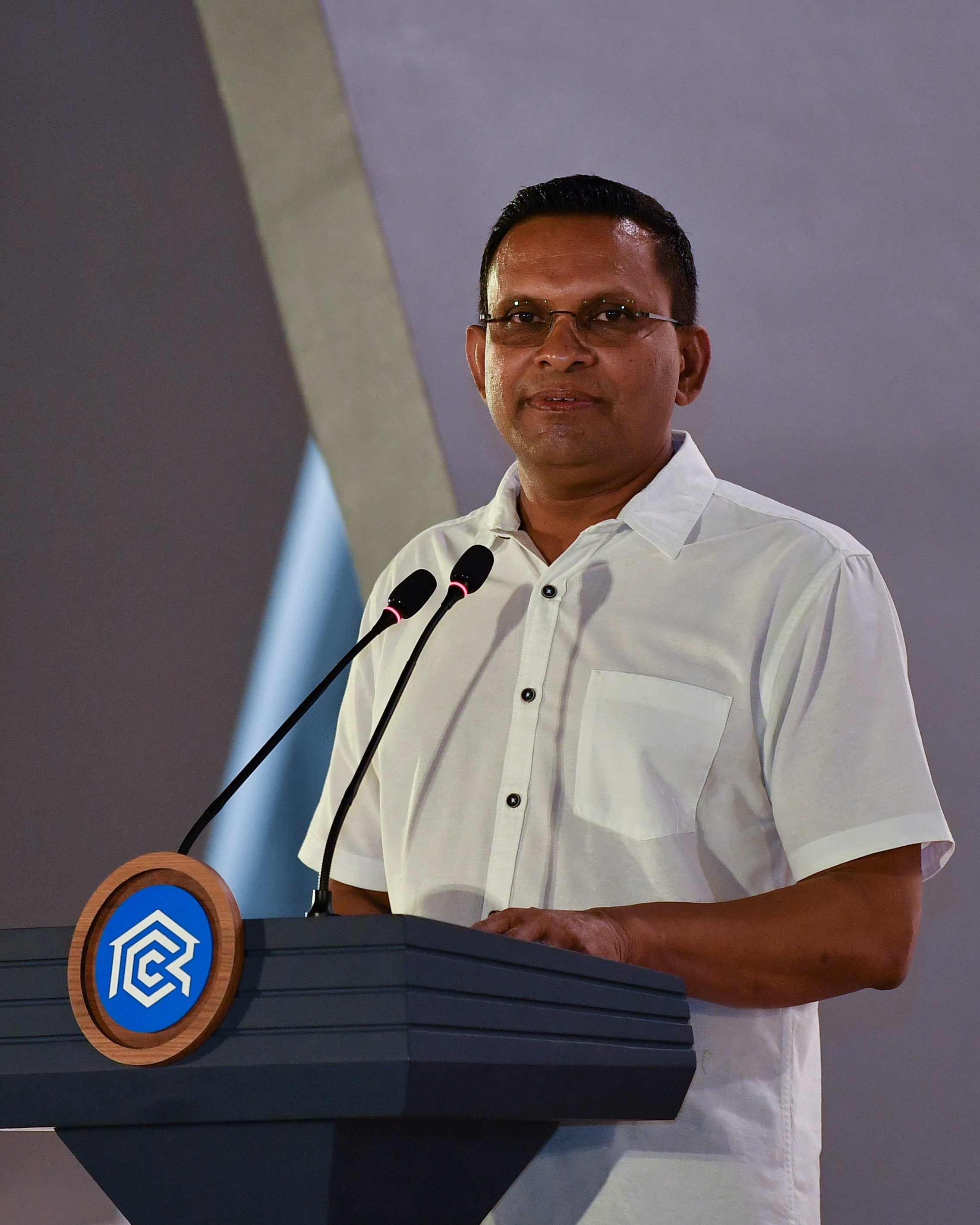

Minister of Defence and National Security
- In office 8 February 2012 – 20 January 2015
- President: Dr. Mohamed Waheed Hassan Manik; Abdulla Yameen Abdul Gayoom
- Preceded by: Thalhath Ibrahim Kaleyfaanu
- Succeeded by: Moosa Ali Jaleel

Personal details
- Born: 21 March 1969 Malé, Maldives
- Spouse: Afaaf Abdul Majeed
- Relations: Adam Azim (brother)
- Education: School of Infantry and Tactic, Quetta, Pakistan; Infantry School, Fort Benning, Georgia, USA; Mubarak Al Abdullah Command and Staff College, Kuwait
- Awards: Presidential Medal; Dedicated Service Medal; Distinguished Service Medal; 3rd November Medal

Military service
- Branch/service: Maldives National Defence Force
- Years of service: 1987–2011
- Rank: Colonel
- Unit: Integrated Headquarters of Maldives National Defence Force
- Commands: Commandant Training Unit; Commanding Officer Quick Reaction Forces II; Commanding Officer Regional Headquarters Seenu Gan; Commanding Officer Maldives National Cadet Corps
- Battles/wars: 1988 Maldives Coup

Colonel (Rtd.) Mohamed Nazim (MSc, psc) (Dhivehi: މުޙައްމަދު ނާޡިމް; born 21 March 1969) is a Maldivian politician who is currently serving as the Member of the People's Majlis for North Maafannu constituency since 2024. He is also the former Minister of Defence and National Security of the Republic of Maldives. He is a founding member of Maldives National Party and currently the serving as the President of the party. He first became the Defense Minister on 8 February 2012 under the presidency of Dr. Mohamed Waheed Hassan Manik. He last served as the Administrative Officer of the Integrated Headquarters of Maldives National Defense Force. He retired from active service on 15 January 2011.

== Biography ==
Born in Malé, Maldives, Nazim graduated from Majeediyya School prior to his enlistment on 11 March 1987. Upon graduation, Nazim was called in by the government to put his compulsory service to the nation as a soldier. He is fondly referred to as Seeney, the name derived from his native place of residence. Nazim was implicated in the coup d'état which occurred on 7 February 2012 in the Maldives. Nazim and his former colleague from the National Security Forces Mr. Abdulla Riyaz seemed to have joined hands in bringing about the apparent coup. The allegation was later rubbished by a report commissioned by the Committee on National Inquiry (CONI), instituted by the then President of Maldives, headed by a former Supreme Court Judge of Singapore. The original report known as the CONI Report seems to have now disappeared since a lot of recommendations made in the Report were not implemented by the subsequent governments of the Maldives.

He commanded the Quick Reaction Force 2 now inducted to the Marine Corps and the Regional Headquarters Seenu Gan now inducted to the Southern Area Command. He was the Commanding Officer of the MNDF squad deployed in dismantling the then major opposition party Maldivian Democratic Party's (MDP) camp or locally known as 'Haruge' at Ma Dhunfunige, Male' in 2005. In addition, he was also the Commanding Officer of the Maldives National Cadet Corps and the President of the Dhivehi Sifainge Club. He held the post of Deputy Commanding Officer of Maldives National Cadet Corps for 6 consecutive years.

Nazim is also involved in his family business, Rasheed Carpentry, which is a construction company. He also runs H78, a small boutique hotel in the island of Hulhumale'. But the hotel is now being run under his daughter's name, Ms. Vulau Nazim. In order to basically promote his party and himself, he has now invested in a TV station named N TV, where 'N' is presumed to represent the first letter of his name Nazim. Apparently, his family business now maintains the Clock Tower monument inaugurated by President Dr Muizzu in early 2024.

== Military career and training ==
He completed all the local military trainings that a soldier would undergo in the Maldives before undergoing the advance trainings in School of Infantry and Tactics, Quetta, Pakistan and in Infantry School, Fort Benning, Georgia, USA. Nazim was initially sent to Royal British Military Academy Sandhurst (RMAS), UK for Officer training, but he was dismissed by RMAS for misbehaviour that is in misalignment with a Military Officer's values and dispositions. Nazim is also a graduate of the Mubarak Al Abdullah Command and Staff College, Kuwait, earning excellence in the Master of Military Science Degree program.

== Family ==
Col (Rtd) Mohamed Nazim is married to Afaaf Abdul Majeed. He has a daughter, Aiminath Vulau and a son, Ahmed Looth. Mr Nazim's younger brother Mr Adam Azim is currently the Mayor of Male', who is also aspiring to run in the upcoming MDP Primary Elections for Presidency. At the same time, Mr Nazim is also expected to run in the 2028 Maldives' Presidential elections.
