= Hussain Adam =

Maldivian soldier (1968–1988)

Shaheed Hussain Adam
- ހުސައިން އާދަމް
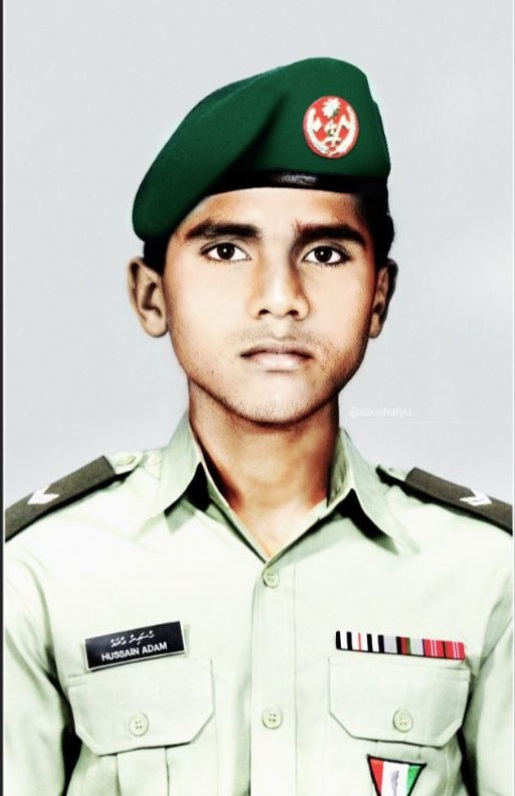
- Born: 28 February 1968; Kulhudhuffushi, Haa Dhaalu Atoll, Maldives
- Died: 3 November 1988 (aged 20); Ban’daara Koshi, Malé
- Cause of death: Multiple gunshot wounds
- Resting place: Henveyru Cemetery (Martyr's Shrine), Henveiru, Malé, Maldives
- Monuments: See list
- Education: Ameeru Ameen School
- Height: 5 ft 8 in (173 cm)
- Military career
- Allegiance: Maldives
- Branch: Maldives National Defence Force
- Rank: Corporal
- Service number: 856
- Known for: National hero for defending Maldives
- Conflicts: 1988 Maldives coup attempt
- Awards: Medal for Exceptional Bravery; 3rd November Medal; Purple Heart Medal

Shaheed (Martyr) Corporal Hussain Adam (28 February 1968 – 3 November 1988), was a Maldivian soldier who died while defending the Maldives National Defence Force headquarters (bandaara koshi), during the coup d'état attempt on 3 November 1988. His heroic actions that day was one of the key reasons why the insurgents failed to breach the main gate of MNDF. His immediate response and actions that day, played a pivotal role in defending the Headquarters from a surprising attack at the dawn.

== Early life ==
Hussain Adam was born on 28 February 1968 to Aishath Hassan and Adam Mohamed in Kulhudhuffushi, Haa Dhaalu Atoll, Maldives. He had 13 siblings. He was educated at Ameeru Ameen School.

== 1988 coup attempt ==
At the early dawn of 3 November 1988, Corporal Hussain Adam was posted to one of the two outdoor security posts responsible for the security of the main gate of MNDF Headquarters. When the insurgents approached to take over the building, he immediately responded shooting at the insurgents who had planned for a surprise attack at dawn. His response was the initial counterattack from the Headquarters. He held them back until he succumbed to the firing after his bullets ran empty. This gave the soldiers inside the Headquarters sufficient time to prepare for a counterattack. He eventually ran out of bullets, but kept demanding for extra magazines till his death.

Today, Martyr Hussain Adam is considered one of the national heroes of Maldives, for his presence of mind and his courage during the terrorist attacks of 3 November 1988.

== Monuments ==
The current Maldives Police Service headquarters is named after him, the building is named "Shaheed Hussain Adam Building", which was officially opened by president Maumoon Abdul Gayoom on 21 April 1999.

Another monument is currently being built for him in his home island, Kulhudhuffushi.
