= Maldives National Cadet Corps =

Military youth organization

- ދިވެހިރާއްޖޭ ޤައުމީ ކެޑޭޓް ކޯ
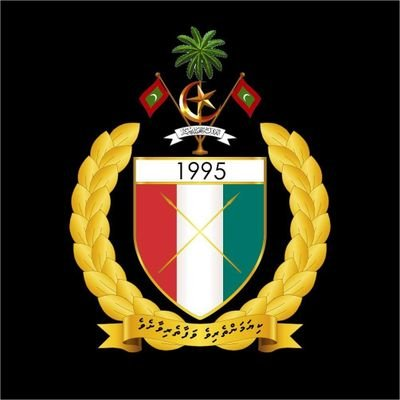
- Emblem of the National Cadet Corps
- Active: 30 years
- Country: Maldives
- Allegiance: Maldivian Army
- Type: Civilian auxiliary
- Role: Uniformed student group
- Mottos: To obey and to be loyal
- Colors: Red and Green
- Website: https://nccmaldives.org.mv

Commanders
- Supreme Commander: Mohamed Muizzu
- Deputy Supreme Commander: ismail shafeeu
- Commanding Officer: Brig. Gen. Abdulla Ibrahim
- Adjutant: Lt. Col. Yoosuf Rasheed
- Director of MNCC: Col. Mohamed Ashraf
- Deputy Director of MNCC: Lt. Col. Yasir Mohamed

The Maldives National Cadet Corps (Dhivehi: ދިވެހިރާއްޖޭ ޤައުމީ ކެޑޭޓް ކޯ, MNCC) is the youth wing of the Maldivian Defence Force with its headquarters being located in the capital of Maldives, Malé. It is the largest youth organization in the Maldives, which functions under the Ministry of Education with logistic assistance from the MNDF. It consists of cadets and bandmates of schools nationwide who are above the age of 11.

== History in brief ==
- Started on 19 March 1945 under the name "Khaassa Party".
- 60 students were selected from Majeediyya School with the founder being Mohamed Amin Didi.
- They wore Khaki uniforms with side pocketed shorts and decorated with a cloth belt called the "soaru fothikolhu".
- The movement was modernised when the school was implemented with English-medium education in 1960.
- Mr. JV Hill (the principal at the time) renamed the movement to the Majeediyya Cadet Corps (MCC).
- The cadets had their first oath taking ceremony in 1963 and were given arms.
- Mr. Amarasena was appointed cadet master at the MCC
- Officially inaugurated on 25 July 1995 with the name "Maldives National Cadet Corps" by president Gayoom with the motto "To be loyal and to obey". It was inaugurated to celebrate the 50th anniversary, Golden jubilee of cadetting in Maldives.
- To mark the 15th anniversary, 3 wings of NCC was inaugurated and wing commanders were appointed. The wings were Police, Army, and Sea.
- In 1966, 23 cadets from the Maldives attended the Diyatalawa Cadet Camp in Sri Lanka.

== Organization ==
The organization is headed by the Supreme Commander and President, Dr. Mohamed Muizzu, and assisted by the Deputy Supreme Commander and Minister of Education, Ismail Shafeeu.

== Schools ==
Regiment	School Name	Island/District
Northern Area Regiment	Haa Alifu Atoll Education Centre	Baarah
Northern Area Regiment	Ihavandhoo School	Ihavandhoo
Northern Area Regiment	Afeefuddin School	Kulhudhuffushi
Northern Area Regiment	Haa Dhaalu Atoll Education Centre	Kulhudhuffushi
Northern Area Regiment	Nolhivaram School	Nolhivaram
Northern Area Regiment	Funadhoo School	Funadhoo
Northern Area Regiment	Noonu Atoll Education Centre	Velidhoo
Northern Area Regiment	Ungoofaaru School	Ungoofaaru
Northern Area Regiment	Madhrasathul Ifthithaah	Naifaru
Male' Area Regiment	Majeediyya School	Male'
Male' Area Regiment	Dharumavantha School	Male'
Male' Area Regiment	Imaduddin School	Male'
Male' Area Regiment	Kalaafaanu School	Male'
Male' Area Regiment	Aminiya School	Male'
Male' Area Regiment	Muhyiddiin School	Vilimale'
Male' Area Regiment	Jamaluddiin School	Male'
Male' Area Regiment	Ahmadhiyya International School	Male'
Male' Area Regiment	Maafushi School	Maafushi
Male' Area Regiment	Thaajuddeen School	Male'
Male' Area Regiment	Iskandhar School	Male'
Male' Area Regiment	Hiriya School	Male'
Male' Area Regiment	Huravee School	Hulhumale'
Male' Area Regiment	Ghaazee School	Hulhumale'
Male' Area Regiment	Rehendhi School	Hulhumale'
Male' Area Regiment	S'alaah'udhdheen School	Hulhumale'
Male' Area Regiment	Shaheed Ali School	Hulhumale'
Central Area Regiment	Mathiveri School	Mathiveri
Central Area Regiment	Dhiggaru School	Dhiggaru
Southern Area Regiment	Fuvahmulaku School	Fuvahmulah
Southern Area Regiment	Gnaviyani Atoll Education Centre	Fuvahmulah
Southern Area Regiment	Hafiz Ahmed School	Fuvahmulah
Southern Area Regiment	Mohamed Jamaaludheen School	Fuvahmulah
Southern Area Regiment	Nooraanee School	Addu Hithadhoo
Southern Area Regiment	Feydhoo School	Addu Feydhoo
Southern Area Regiment	Hithadhoo School	Addu Hithadhoo
Southern Area Regiment	Maradhoo School	Addu Maradhoo
Southern Area Regiment	Sharafuddin School	Addu Hithadhoo
Southern Area Regiment	Irushadhiyya School	Addu Maradhoofeydhoo
Southern Area Regiment	Seenu Atoll School	Hulhumeedhoo
