= Ahmed Shiyam =

Ahmed Shiyam may refer to:

- Ahmed Shiyam (major general) Major General
- Ahmed Shiyam (minister) Fisheries Minister of the Maldives
