= Ibrahim Hilmy =

Chief of Defence Force of the Maldives since 2024

- އިބްރާހީމް ޙިލްމީ
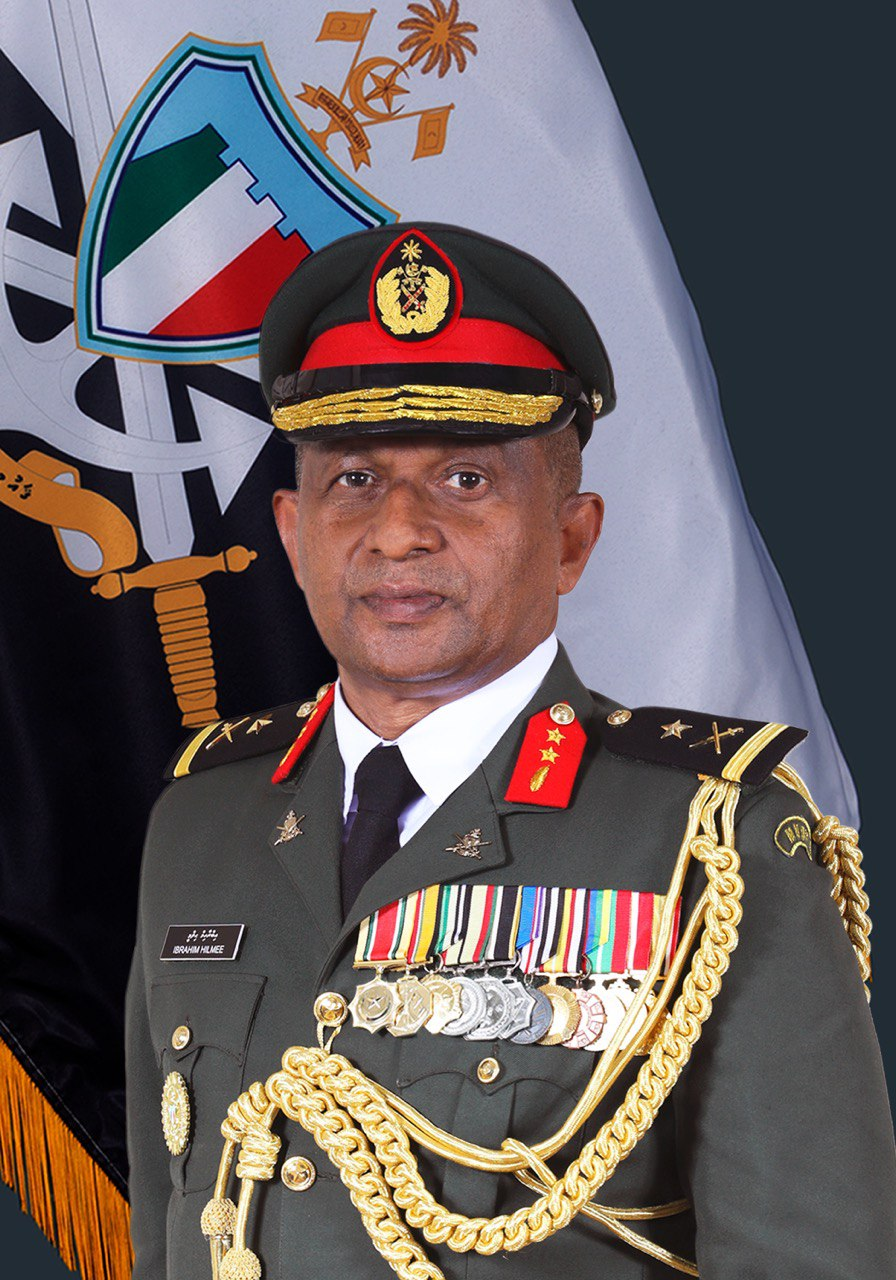
- Official portrait, 2024

Chief of Defence Force
- Incumbent
- Assumed office 18 April 2024
- Appointed by: Mohamed Muizzu
- Deputy: Ahmed Ghiyas
- Preceded by: Abdul Raheem Abdul Latheef

Vice Chief of Defence Force
- In office 17 December 2023 – 17 April 2024
- Appointed by: Mohamed Muizzu
- Preceded by: Abdul Raheem Abdul Latheef
- Succeeded by: Ahmed Ghiyas

Personal details
- Born: 1969 (age 56–57) Malé, Maldives
- Children: 4

Military service
- Allegiance: Maldives
- Branch/service: Maldives National Defence Force
- Years of service: 25 April 1988; 38 years ago
- Battles/wars: 1988 Maldives coup attempt

Ibrahim Hilmy (Dhivehi: އިބްރާހީމް ޙިލްމީ; born 1969) is a Maldivian military officer who is currently serving as the Chief of Maldives National Defence Force since April 2024. He previously served as Vice Chief of Defence Force, under Abdul Raheem Abdul Latheef.

== Military career ==
Ibrahim Hilmy joined the military on 25 April 1988 as a Private. He later fulfilled the ranks of Lance Corporal, Corporal, Sergeant, Staff Sergeant, and Warrant Officer. After years of service and experience, Hilmy was commissioned as an officer on 21 April 2002, rising through the ranks of Lieutenant, First Lieutenant, and Captain. His growing responsibilities saw him promoted to Major, Lieutenant Colonel, and Colonel. In May 2023, Hilmy reached the rank of Brigadier General. In December 2023, he was appointed Vice Chief of Defence Force. On 18 April 2024, he was appointed Chief of Defence Force.

In June 2020, Hilmy was appointed Central Area Commander of the Maldives National Defence Force. On 6 February 2022, Hilmy was appointed Commander of the MNDF Coast Guard. His career also includes key roles in the Maldivian Army, such as Commanding Officer of the Defence Institute for Training and Education (DIT) and Principal Director of Plans, Policy, and Resource Management (J5/J8). From 2016 to 2019, he served as Defence Advisor to Pakistan. He also commanded the Aviation Security Command and MNDF Central Area Command from 2020 to 2022.

=== Training ===
Hilmy participated in the Marine Accident and Incident Investigation Course by the International Maritime Organization in India, the Junior Staff Officers Course in Bangladesh, the Law of Armed Conflict Instructors Course in Malaysia, and the Joint Warfare Course Officers Course in Singapore. Additionally, Hilmy received On-Job-Training aboard Indian Naval Ship INS Beas French Naval Ship FNS Floréal, and British Royal Navy ship HMS Chatham.

== Awards ==
Hilmy has been awarded 12 medals and 10 ribbons, including the November 3 Medal, Presidential Medal, Distinguished Service Medal, Long Service Medal, and Army Service Medal. In 2024, he received State Service Award. His decorations also include the 17th SAARC Summit Medallion and the Republic 50's Medal.

- 3rd November Medal
- Presidential Medal
- Distinguished Service Medal
- Long Service Medal
- State Service Award

== See also ==
- Abdulla Shamaal
