= Mohamed Zahir =

Chief of Defence Force from 1996 to 2008

- މުޙައްމަދު ޒާހިރު
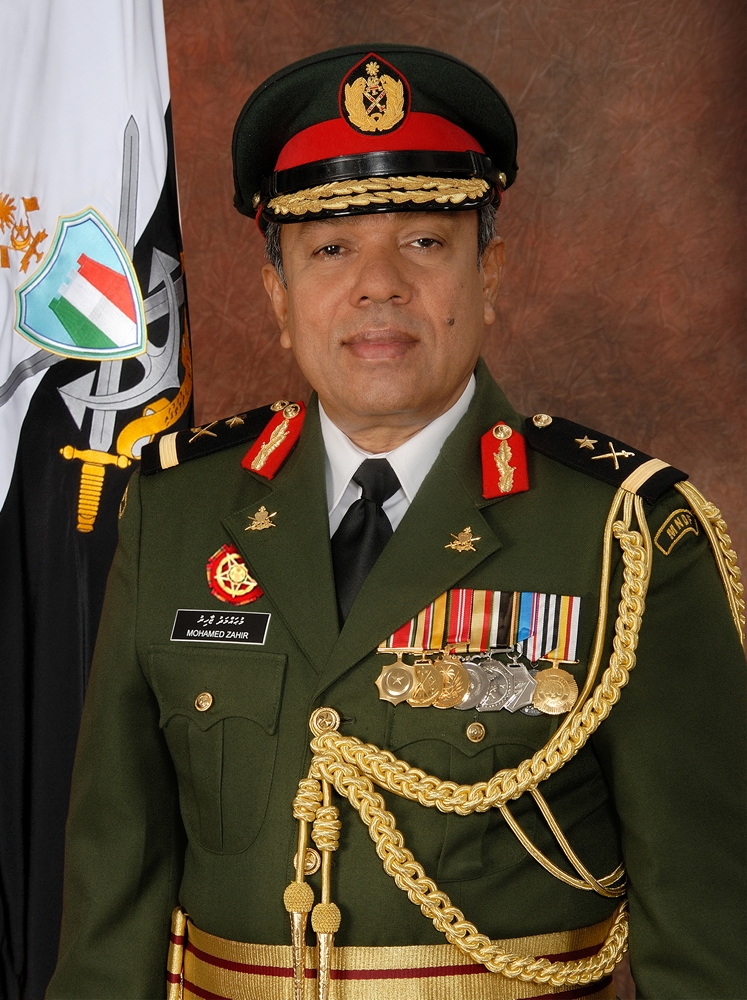
- Official portrait, 2013

National Security Advisor
- In office 18 November 2008 – 10 December 2010
- President: Mohamed Nasheed
- Preceded by: Created
- Succeeded by: Ameen Faisal

Chief of Defence Force
- In office 11 November 1996 – 18 November 2008
- President: Maumoon Abdul Gayoom
- Preceded by: Abdul Sattar Adam
- Succeeded by: Moosa Ali Jaleel

Personal details
- Education: Majeediyya School
- Alma mater: Hendon Police College; Naval Postgraduate School; Harvard Kennedy School; College of Defence and Security Studies
- Nickname: 22 Zahir
- Military career
- Allegiance: Maldives
- Branch: Maldives National Defence Force
- Service years: 1972–2013
- Rank: Major general
- Conflicts: 1988 Maldives coup attempt
- Awards: Medal for Exceptional Bravery; Order of Distinguished Army Service; Distinguished Service Medal; Presidential Medal; Dedicated Service Medal

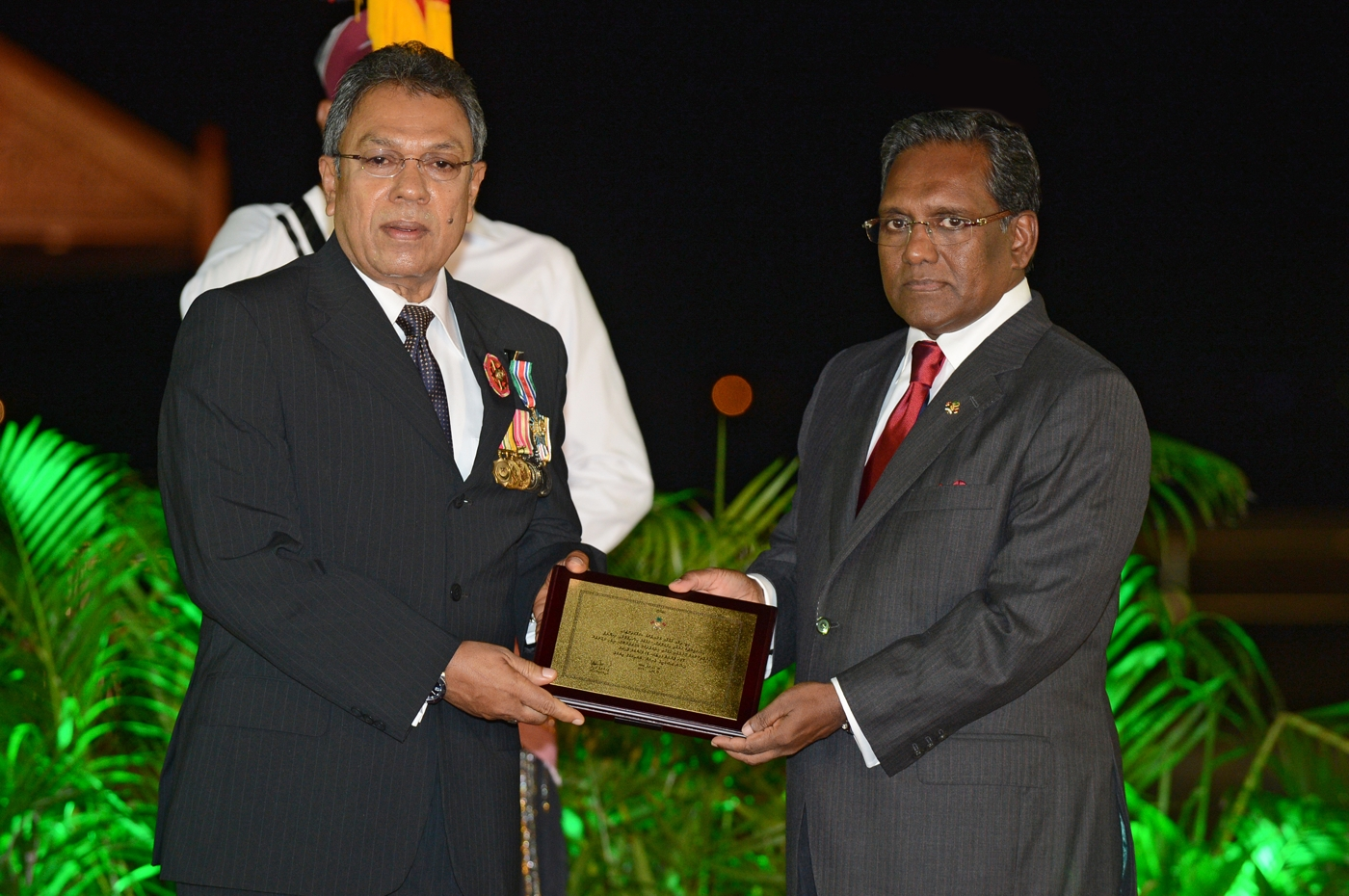
Zahir receiving the Order of Distinguished Army Service from president Mohamed Waheed Hassan in 2013.

Major General (Retired) Mohamed Zahir (Dhivehi: މުހައްމަދު ޒާހިރު) is a former Chief of Defence Force of the Maldives National Defence Force (MNDF) and the National Security Advisor of the Maldives.

== Education ==
Zahir had his secondary education in Majeediyya School. Zahir is a graduate of Hendon Police College, London, United Kingdom, and the Naval Postgraduate School, Monterey, United States. He also attended the John F. Kennedy School of Government, United States, in a program for Senior Executives in National and International Security. He was also awarded an honorary master's degree from the College of Defence and Security Studies (CDSS) of MNDF on 6 November 2017.

== Career ==
In 1972, Zahir joined the civil service and worked in various government departments before enlisting in the Maldives National Defense Force in 1978 to the rank of sergeant and was commissioned as an officer two years later.

He assumed command as Chief of Defence Force (CDF) of MNDF, formerly known as the National Security Service (NSS), on 11 November 1996, as a brigadier. He was promoted to the rank of major general on 21 April 2004. He was also the chairman of the MNDF Advisory Council, the highest forum of senior serving officers. Zahir is also known to many Maldivians by the nickname "two two Zahir" (22 Zahir). He held the post of CDF until 18 November 2008. He was then appointed as the national security advisor on 18 November 2008 and remained in the appointment until 2010.

During his past years of service, he has undertaken various command positions within different units of the MNDF. Before assuming the duties as the chief of staff of MNDF, he was also the deputy chief of staff of MNDF. During this tenure, he played an integral role in conceptualising and doctrinally developing the operational functioning of all the arms and services of the MNDF. He has also commanded the NSS Training Unit, now re-established as the Defence Institute for Training and Education, whereby laying the groundwork for restructure and streamlining overall training policies. Zahir's dedicated effort in the development of the military has been highly appreciated by all ranks of the Maldives National Defence Force.

In 2008, he was appointed as the National Security Advisor to the President of the Maldives until 2010, where his successor was Ameen Faisal.

== Family life ==
Zahir is married to Fathimath Amira, a former principal of the Centre for Higher Secondary Education. Zahir has four sons and one daughter. His second son, Colonel Hussain Fairoosh, is currently serving in the Maldives National Defence Force.

== Awards ==
On 3 November 2008, for his gallant actions in the incidents of 1988, when a group of PLOTE mercenaries from Sri Lanka attacked the capital Malé, he was awarded the second highest gallantry award (Dhivehi: ޣާޒީގެ އެންމެ މަތިވެރި ޢަސްކަރީ ޝަރަފު), the Medal for Exceptional Bravery, by President Maumoon Abdul Gayoom. In addition, he is also decorated with the Presidential Medal, Distinguished Service Medal and the Dedicated Service Medal. On 26 July 2013, he was awarded the then highest honour of the state for Distinguished Army Service named "Nishan Askareege Verikan" (Dhivehi: ނިޝާން ޢަސްކަރީގެ ވެރިކަން(ނ.އ.ވ)) in recognition of his military service to the security of the nation and its people and his invaluable contribution towards maintaining peace and tranquillity in the country.

| Preceded by Ambaree Abdul Sattar | Chief of Defence Force (Maldives); 1996–2008 | Succeeded by Moosa Ali Jaleel |
| Preceded by None | National Security Advisor; 2008–2010 | Succeeded by Ameen Faisal |
