= Ahmed Mohamed (general) =

Maldivian military officer

Brigadier General Ahmed Mohamed
- Military career
- Allegiance: Maldives
- Branch: Maldives National Defence Force
- Rank: Brigadier General
- Commands: Vice Chief of Defence Force; Commander Northern Area; Commanding Officer Engineering Service; Commanding Officer Supply Unit; Commanding Officer Regional Headquarters S.Gan; Commanding Officer Regional Headquarters L.Kadhdhoo; Commanding Officer Quick Reaction Force II; Commanding Officer Planning and Research Development Wing
- Conflicts: 1988 Maldives Coup
- Awards: Presidential Medal; Distinguished Service Medal; Dedicated Service Medal; Defence Force Service Medal; 3 November Medal; Good Conduct Medal

Brigadier General Ahmed Mohamed was the Vice Chief of Defence Force of the Maldives National Defence Force. He was appointed to this post on 4 March 2012. Brigadier General Ahmed Mohamed was born on 9 July 1964 in the island of Maroshi, Shaviyani Atoll.

== Military career and training ==
After completion of secondary school in 1983 at Majeedhiyya School, Mohamed enlisted in Maldives National Defence Force (MNDF) on 13 March 1984 as a Lance Corporal and was commissioned eight years later on 21 April 1992. He was promoted to the current rank of Brigadier General on 8 February 2009.

Mohamed is a graduate of the Command and Staff College, Quetta, Pakistan. He is a fellow of Asia Pacific Center for Security Studies (APCSS), Hawaii and an alumnus of Near East South Asia Center for Strategic Studies, Washington DC, and Marshall European Center for Security Studies, Germany. He has also completed the Governance and Management of Defence Course held by the Royal Military College of Science, Cranfield University.

== Commands held ==
Mohamed was appointed as the Vice Chief of Defence Force on 4 March 2012. He had served as the Commander of MNDF Northern Area. The General has also held various other command and staff appointments including executive officer of MNDF headquarters, commanding officer of MNDF engineering service, commanding officer of supply unit, executive officer of Ministry of Defence and National Security, commanding officer of both regional headquarters S.Gan and L.Kadhdhoo, commanding officer of quick reaction force II, commanding officer of planning and research development wing, managing director of Sifainge Ekuveri Kunfuni (SEK) and president of MNDF sports and recreation club.

== Military decorations ==
Service Medal decorations

- The Presidential Medal
- The Distinguished Service Medal
- The Dedicated Service Medal
- The Defence Force Service Medal
- The 3 November Medal
- The Good Conduct Medal

== Family ==
Mohamed is married to Selvia Hameed and has a daughter and a son.

Preceded by Farhath Shaheer	Vice Chief of Defence Force (Maldives); 2012- Present	Succeeded by _
