= Thalhath Ibrahim Kaleyfaanu =

Maldivian military officer

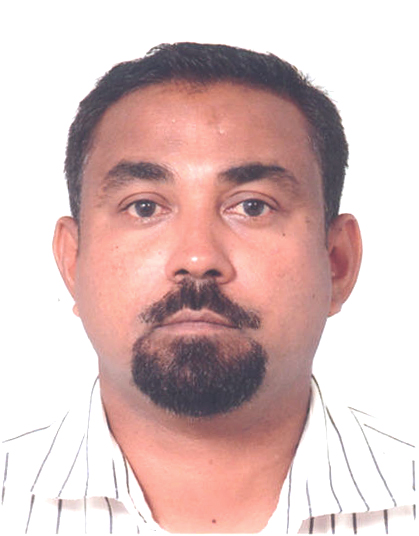

Minister of Defence and National Security
- In office 30 June 2011 – 7 February 2012
- President: Mohamed Nasheed
- Preceded by: Uz. Mohamed Muizzu Adnan
- Succeeded by: Colonel (Rtd.) Mohamed Nazim

Thalhath Ibrahim Kaleyfaanu is a Maldivian military officer and former Minister of Defence and National Security (2011-2012).

== Biography ==
Kaleyfaanu joined the National Security Service in 1989. At the time of joining, he was enlisted in national security with a rank of private, and then lance corporal, corporal, and sergeant until he was promoted to the rank of staff sergeant and warrant officer in grade 1. Prior to his retirement in 2006 from the service as a lieutenant, he was the first lieutenant at the National Security Service as well as the Maldives National Defence Force.

== Arrest ==
Kaleyfaanu was charged in 2015–2016 by the Criminal Court of Maldives for his alleged role in terrorism and arbitrary arrest of Criminal Court Chief Justice Abdulla Mohamed in 2012. The Supreme Court of the Maldives issued a 10-year jail sentence for Kaleyfaanu, however Kaleyfaanu filed a review request for his conviction, which later in 2018 was provisionally accepted by the Supreme Court.
