= Moosa Ali Jaleel =

Maldivian military officer (born 1960)

- މޫސާ ޢަލީ ޖަލީލް
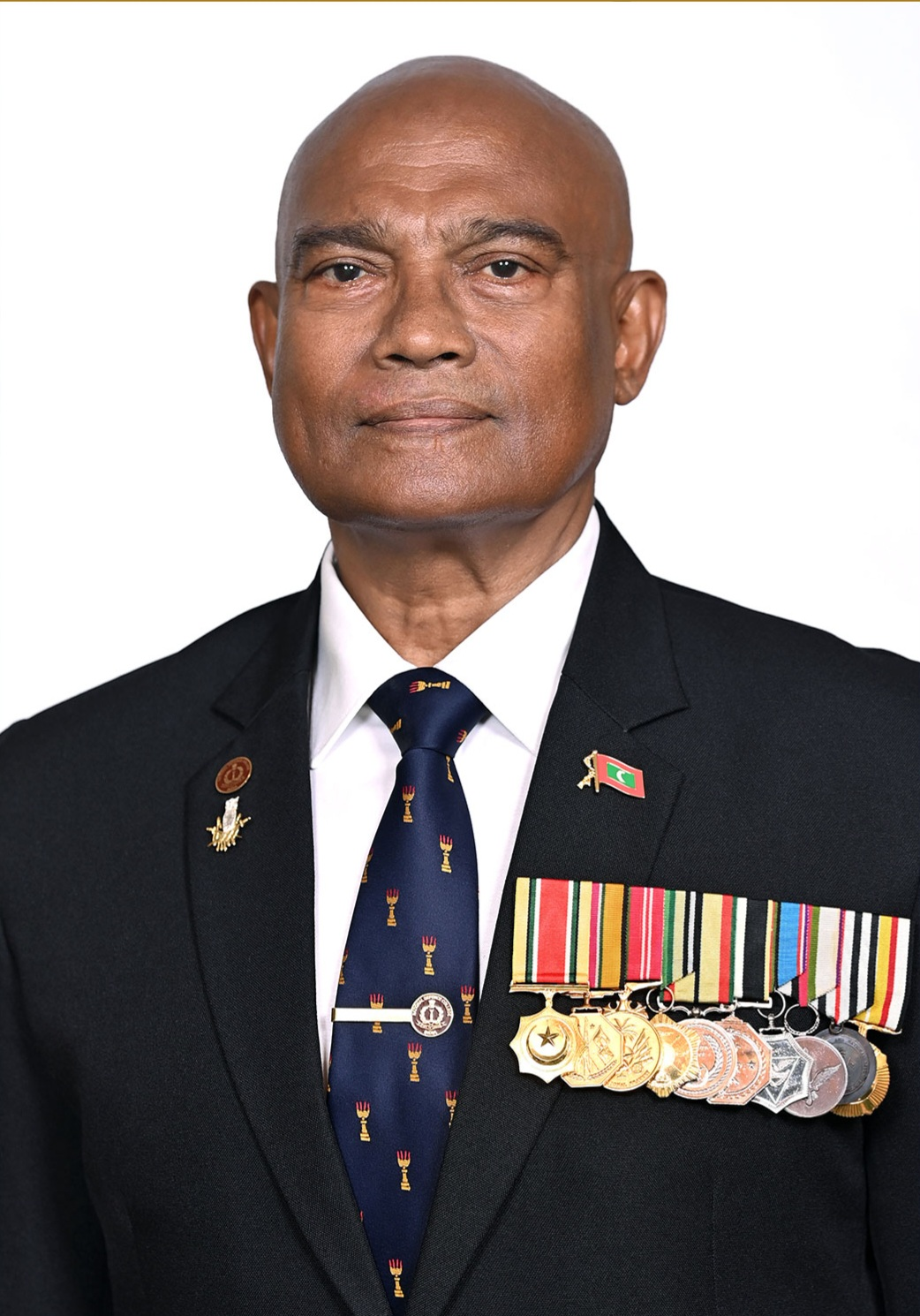
- Official portrait, 2024

Minister of Defence and National Security
- In office 20 January 2015 – 14 October 2015
- President: Abdulla Yameen
- Preceded by: Mohamed Nazim
- Succeeded by: Adam Shareef

High Commissioner of the Maldives to Pakistan
- In office 5 June 2014 – 19 January 2015
- President: Abdulla Yameen
- Preceded by: Aishath Shehenaz Adam
- Succeeded by: Ahmed Saleem

3rd Chief of Defence Force
- In office 18 November 2008 – 7 February 2012
- President: Mohamed Nasheed
- Preceded by: Mohamed Zahir
- Succeeded by: Ahmed Shiyam

Personal details
- Born: 26 June 1960 (age 66) Malé, Maldive Islands
- Party: People's National Congress
- Other political affiliations: Progressive Party of Maldives
- Education: SAFTI Military Institute; United States Army Infantry School; Commando Training Centre Royal Marines; Defence Services Staff College; Naval Postgraduate School; University of Madras
- Awards: Full list

Military service
- Allegiance: Maldives
- Branch/service: Maldives National Defence Force
- Years of service: 1980–2012
- Rank: Major General
- Battles/wars: 1988 Maldives coup attempt

Major General (Retired) Moosa Ali Jaleel (Dhivehi: މޫސާ ޢަލީ ޖަލީލް; born 26 June 1960) is a Maldivian retired military officer who served as the 3rd Chief of Defence Force of the Maldives National Defence Force from 18 November 2008 to 7 February 2012. Jaleel also held office as the Minister of Defence and National Security from January to October 2015 during the presidency of Abdulla Yameen Abdul Gayoom. He was also the High Commissioner of the Maldives to Pakistan from 2014 to 2015.

== Early life and education ==
Moosa Ali Jaleel was born on 26 June 1960 in Malé, Maldives.

He completed his secondary schooling at Majeediyya School. After signing up for enlistment on 3 July 1980, he had completed extensive military service training. He had taken an officer cadet course at the SAFTI Military Institute, a nofficer basic course and an infantry officer advance course at the United States Army Infantry School at Fort Benning, an all arms commando course at the Commando Training Centre Royal Marines, studied at the Defence Services Staff College and the National Defence College, completed an executive course at the Asia-Pacific Center for Security Studies and at the Near East South Asia Center for Strategic Studies, a defence resource management course at the Naval Postgraduate School, a senior officer logistic course in Bangladesh.

In 2005, Jaleel completed his Master of Philosophy and Master of Science in Defence and Strategic Studies at the University of Madras.

== Career ==
During the 1988 coup attempt, PLOTE mercenaries attacked the Bandaara Koshi (army headquarters). At the time, Jaleel was the commander of the infantry unit task force. He was injured in the leg after the mercenaries shot the police station. Jaleel helped to defend the army headquarters and volunteered to monitor the enemy movements. He had been called one of the greatest helpers during that battle.

Jaleel was appointed as the Chief of Defence Force by President Mohamed Nasheed on 18 November 2008 until 7 February 2012.

Jaleel retired from the Maldives National Defence Force on 9 February 2012.

On 3 April 2014, President Abdulla Yameen nominated Jaleel as the High Commissioner of the Maldives to Pakistan. He was later subsequently appointed as the Ambassador in May. He presented his letter of credence to President of Pakistan Mamnoon Hussain on 5 June 2014. He served until 19 January 2015.

On 20 January 2015, President Abdulla Yameen appointed Jaleel as the Minister of Defence and National Security.

Jaleel was charged with terrorism for the detention of Judge Abdulla Mohamed and was later acquitted.

Jaleel was dismissed as the Minister of Defence and National Security amid the 2015 Finifenmaa boat explosion.

In March 2023, the Anti-Corruption Commission sought to charge Jaleel for his alleged involvement in the Maldives Marketing and Public Relations Corporation scandal. Jaleel denied any involvement in the scandal.

In November 2024, President Mohamed Muizzu announced his intention to award Jaleel with the Grand Order of Military Honour. The honour acknowledges Jaleel's coverage and bravery shown in the 1988 coup attempt. President Muizzu later conferred it at a ceremony on Victory Day.

In December 2025, Jaleel was confirmed as a candidate for the People's National Congress in the Malé Mayoral elections. He was criticised by former president Abdulla Yameen, who called him a "sacrificial lamb" and that he's already failed if he follows President Muizzu's footsteps. He later lost to Adam Azim.

== Military decorations ==
Major General Jaleel is one of the most decorated officers within the Maldives National Defence Force, with 10 service medals and 9 service ribbons for his leadership and service in the defence force.

National Honours

- Grand Order of Military Honour (GOMH)

Service Medal decorations

- The Presidential Medal
- The Defence Force Service Medal
- The Distinguished Service Medal
- The Good Conduct Medal
- The Medal for Exceptional Bravery (Huravee Ran Medal)
- The Dedicated Service Medal
- The Purple Heart (Jihaadhuge Raiy Medal)
- The Long Service Medal
- 3 November Medal
- The Centenary Medal

Service Ribbon decorations

- Presidential Ribbon
- Defence Force Service Ribbon
- Long Service Ribbon
- Dedicated Service Ribbon
- Special Duty Ribbon
- Achievement Ribbon (Twice)
- Good Conduct Ribbon (Twice)

Preceded by Adam Zahir	Vice Chief of Defence Force; 2004–2008	Succeeded by Farhath Shaheer
Preceded by Mohamed Zahir	Chief of Defence Force; 2008–2012	Succeeded by Ahmed Shiyam
Preceded by Mohamed Nazim	Minister of Defence and National Security; 2015–2015	Succeeded by Adam Shareef
