= MNDF Air Corps =

Air Corps
- MNDF Air Corps flag
- Founded: 2024
- Country: Maldives
- Type: Air force
- Part of: Maldives National Defence Force

Commanders
- Commander-In-Chief: President Mohamed Muizzu
- Commandant: Brigadier General Abdul Rauf

Insignia
- Roundel

Aircraft flown
- Attack: Baykar Bayraktar TB2
- Utility helicopter: HAL Dhruv
- Transport: Dornier 228, ATR 72

The MNDF Air Corps is the air arm of the Maldives National Defence Force.

== History ==
On 15 March 2024, President Mohamed Muizzu inaugurated the MNDF Air Corps to protect the Maldives' exclusive economic zone (EEZ) and the airspace of the country.

The Maldives National Defence Force (MNDF) recently acquired the Baykar Bayraktar TB2 UAV (Unmanned Aerial Vehicle), a widely used drone originally developed by the Turkish defense company Baykar. The Bayraktar TB2 is a medium-altitude, long-endurance (MALE) UAV renowned for its versatility, particularly in intelligence, surveillance, and reconnaissance (ISR) roles, as well as its ability to conduct precision strikes.

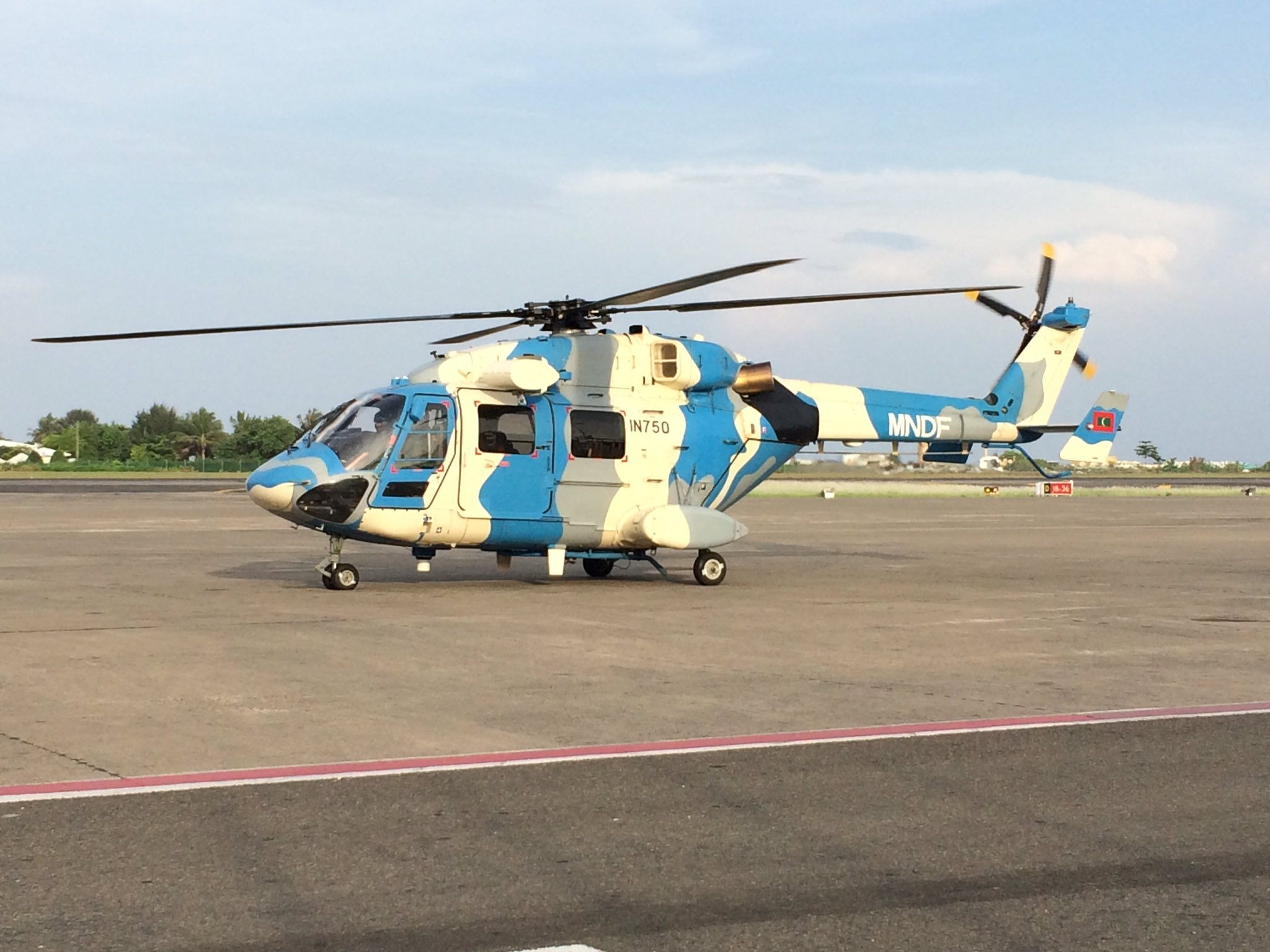
HAL Dhruv ALH gifted by India to Maldives

== Aircraft ==
Aircraft	Origin	Type	Variant	In service	Notes
UAVs
Bayraktar TB2	Turkey	UCAV		6	Bought from Turkey.
Transport
Dornier 228	Germany / India	Maritime patrol		1	Gifted and operated by India
ATR 72MP	France	Maritime patrol	ATR 72-600	1	Bought by ATR and modified by Italy
Helicopters
HAL Dhruv	India	SAR / Utility	Mk.3	2	Gifted and operated by India

=== Radars ===
Name	Origin	Type	Notes
Selex RAT-31DL	Italy	AESA Air Search Radar	2 installations
1L-117	Russia	Air Search Radar	2 installations
AN/TPS-43	United States	3D Air Search Radar	4 installations
JH-16	China	Air Search Radar	
JY-11B	China	3D Air Search Radar	
KRONOS LAND	Italy	AESA Air Search Radar	1 installation
YLC-6	China	Air Search Radar	
Plessey AR15	United Kingdom	Air Search Radar	
RL-64I	Czech Republic	S-Band Airport Surveillance Radar(ASR)	

=== Air defence ===
Name	Origin	Type	Notes
SAM
FM-90	China	SAM	14 batteries received
FN-6	China	MANPADS	15
QW-2 Vanguard 2	China	MANPADS	5
