= Majeediyya School =

Primary and secondary school in Malé, Maldives

Coordinates: 4.177631°N 73.514917°E

- މަޖީދިއްޔާ ސުކޫލް
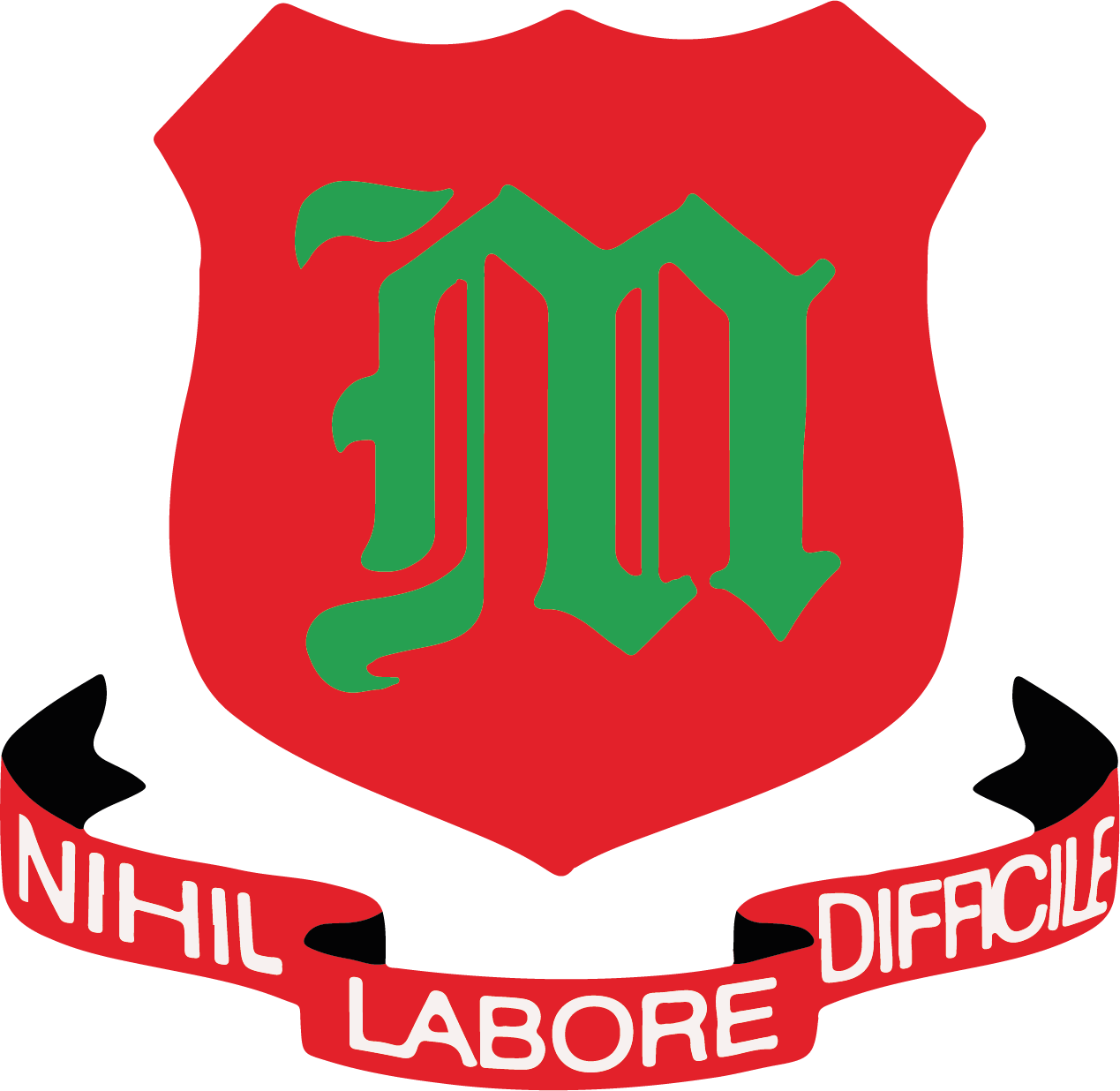

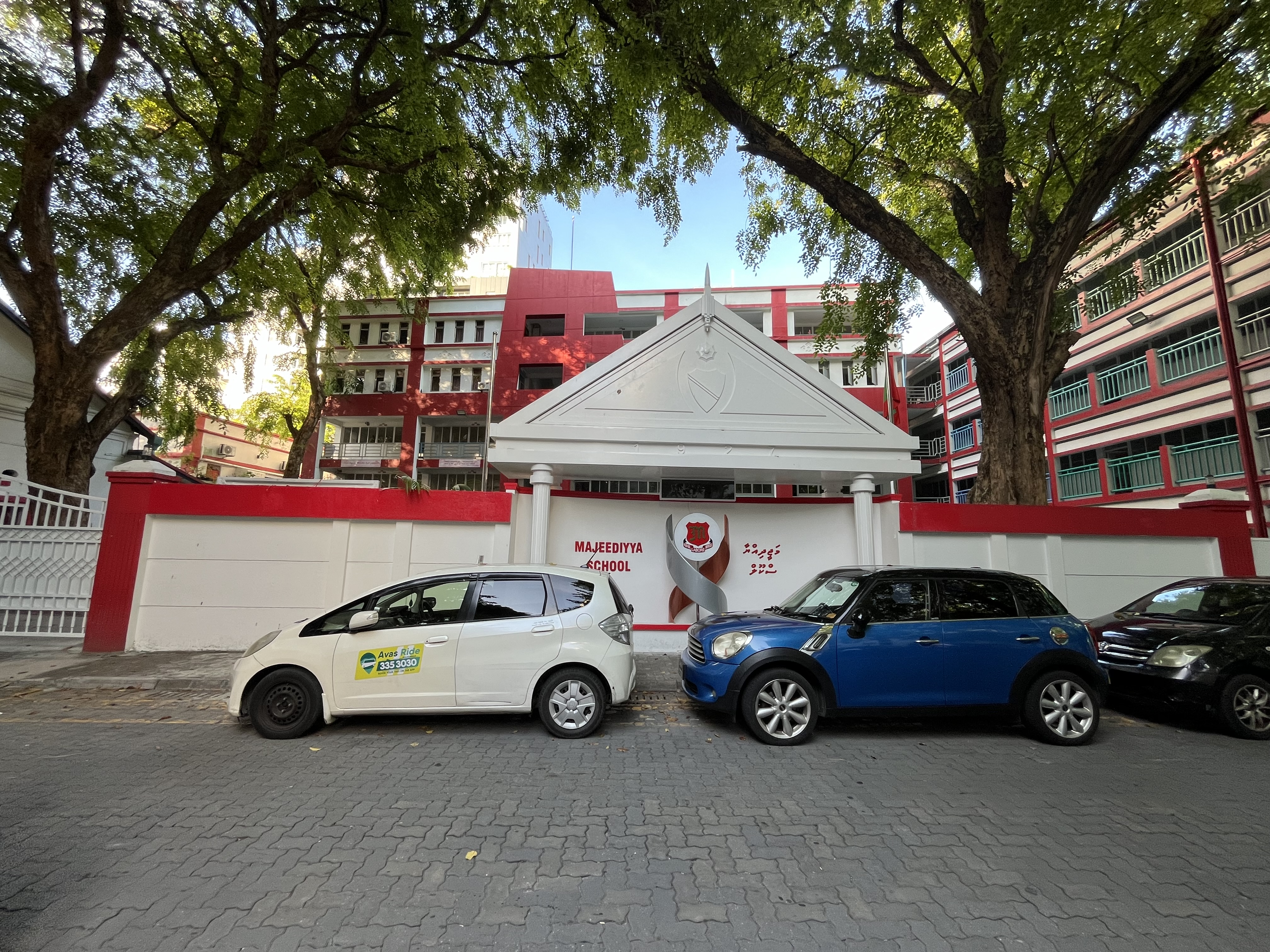

Location
- Medhuziyaarai Magu; Henveiru; Malé, Kaafu Atoll 20087; Maldives

Information
- School type: Primary and Secondary
- Motto: “Nihil Labore Difficile” (Latin) (“Nothing is impossible with hard work”)
- Founded: April 19, 1927
- Administrator: Fathimath Suzana
- Principal: Ahmed Mujahid
- Deputy Principal (Morning): Sharuneela Zuhair
- Deputy Principal (Afternoon): Rifga Rashid
- Houses: 4
- Colour: Green Red
- Website: majeediyya.edu.mv
- Last updated: 24 February 2025

Majeediyya School (Dhivehi: މަޖީދިއްޔާ ސުކޫލް) is the first Maldivian government school, located in Malé, Maldives. It only accepted boys until the introduction of Primary Education in 2010, which allowed girls to attend the school as well. The English medium is followed throughout all subjects, with the exception of Dhivehi and Islam.

== History ==
Majeediyya School was founded in April 19, 1927, under the name Madhrasathul Salaahiyyaa. The school name was changed to Madhrasathul Saniyyathul Hukoomathul Mahaldheebiyya in 1928. The first principal of the school was Husain Salahuddin. Mohamed Amin Didi was Principal from 1946 to 1953 and it was during this time that the school was renamed Madhrasathul Majeediyya. The first GCE O Level started in 1962. The school started providing coeducation in 2011 and had its second enrollment of grade 1 students. There has been some concerns over conditions of the school in the years such as in 2018, where teachers protested over altercations, as well as recently in 2024, where the bridge connecting the old building and the new building has seen cracks come up.

There are two songs associated with the school.

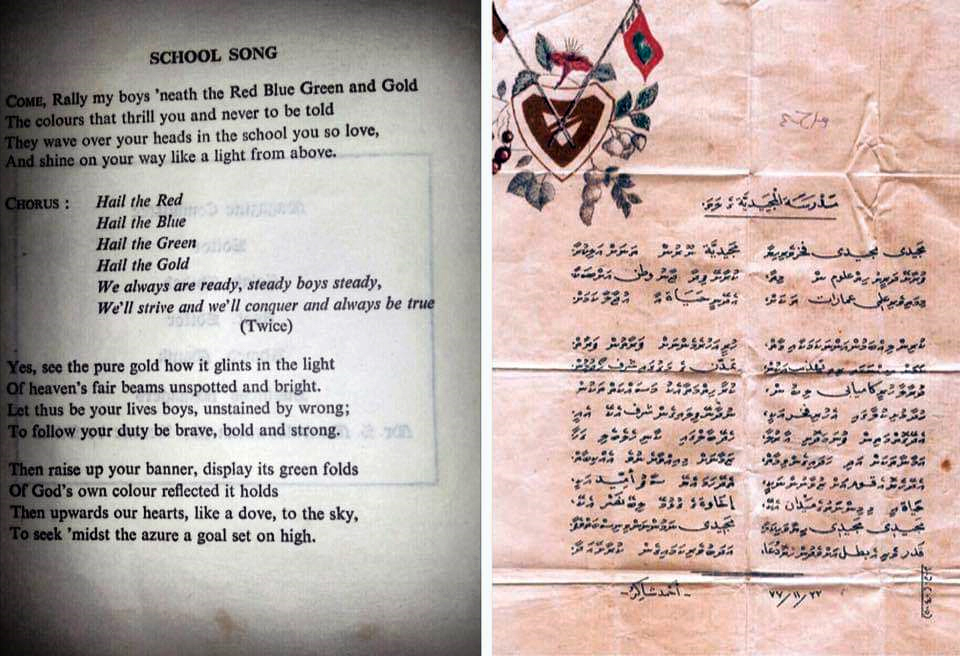
The old English school song and the new Dhivehi one of Majeediyya School.

== Extracurriculars ==
=== Band ===
On July 1, 1965, the first Bandmaster of Majeediyya School, Lieutenant A. A. Semidone, began music theory class. He founded the Marching Band of Majeediyya School. In 1979, the band became a fully functional brass band. Woodwind instruments were introduced in 1997.

=== Cadet ===
The Majeediyya Cadet Corps started as the "Khassa Party" on March 19, 1945 which was founded by Mohamed Amin Didi. It was later developed and modernized in 1960. It was later renamed to the Majeediyya Cadet Corps sometimes referred as the Maldives Cadet Corps.

=== Scout ===
In May 1961, it was founded as the First Male’ Scout Group and was registered at the Imperial Scout Headquarters in London by Mr. C. Dymoke Green. The First Male' Scout Group holds the record of having the most number of President Scouts and Baden Powell Awardees. It's sometimes called the Majeediyya Scouts.

== Notable alumni ==
Majeediyya school has produced 8 Presidents of the Maldives and various other well-known figures in the country. Some notable alumni include:

=== Presidents ===
- Mohamed Amin Didi - 1st President of the Maldives from January 1, 1953 to August 21, 1953. The principal of Majeediyya School from 1946 to 1953. (Never attended Majeediyya School).
- Ibrahim Nasir - 2nd President of the Maldives from 1968 to 1978. Prime Minister of the Maldives from 1957 to 1968.
- Maumoon Abdul Gayoom - 3rd President of the Maldives from 1978 to 2008.
- Mohamed Nasheed - 4th President of the Maldives from 2008 to 2012. First democratically elected president.
- Mohamed Waheed Hassan Manik - 5th President of the Maldives from 2012 to 2013. Taught Dhivehi at the school. (Never attended Majeediyya School)
- Abdulla Yameen - 6th President of the Maldives from 2013 to 2018.
- Ibrahim Mohamed Solih - 7th President of the Maldives from 2018 to 2023.
- Mohamed Muizzu - 8th President of the Maldives from 2023 to present.

=== Military ===
- Major General (Rtd) Moosa Ali Jaleel - Former Chief of Defence Force of the Maldives from 2008 to 2012, who played an important role in the victory against terrorists attack on 3 November 1988.
- Mohamed Nazim - Former Colonel and the Defence Minister of Maldives from 2012.

=== Diplomats ===
- Ahmed Khaleel - Former Minister of State for Foreign Affairs, Former Permanent Representative of Maldives to the United Nations, Ambassador to Japan concurrently accredited to South Korea
- Mohamed Khaleel - Former High Commissioner to Singapore, Ambassador to Saudi Arabia concurrently accredited to other Arab countries.

=== Athletes ===
- Ali Ashfaq - football player. Also the captain of the Maldives national football team.
- Ibrahim Fazeel - football player in Maldives national football team
