= Military ranks of Maldives =

The Military ranks of the Maldives are the ranks used by the Maldives National Defence Force. The ranks are based on a combination of the traditional British military system and the U.S. military system.

== Commissioned officer ranks ==
The rank insignia of commissioned officers.

Rank group	General / flag officers				Senior officers			Junior officers
Maldives National Defence Force
Dhivehi	ޖެނެރަލް	ލެފްޓިނަންޓް ޖެނެރަލް	މޭޖަރ ޖެނެރަލް	ބްރިގޭޑިއަރ ޖެނެރަލް	ކާނަލް	ލެފްޓިނަންޓް ކާނަލް	މޭޖަރ	ކެޕްޓަން	ފަސްޓް ލެފްޓިނަންޓް	ލެފްޓިނަންޓް
Malé	Jeneral	Leftinant jeneral	Meyjar jeneral	Brigeydiar jeneral	Kaanal	Leftinant kaanal	Meyjar	Keptan	Fast leftinant	Leftinant
English translation	General	Lieutenant general	Major general	Brigadier general	Colonel	Lieutenant colonel	Major	Captain	First lieutenant	Lieutenant

=== Student officer ranks ===
Rank group	Student officer
Maldives National Defence Force

== Warrant officers ==
Rank group	Warrant officers
Maldives National Defence Force
Dhivehi	ޗީފް ވޮރަންޓް އޮފިސަރ	ވޮރަންޓް އޮފިސަރ 4	ވޮރަންޓް އޮފިސަރ 3	ވޮރަންޓް އޮފިސަރ2	ވޮރަންޓް އޮފިސަރ1
Malé	Cheef vorant ofisar	Vorant ofisar 4	Vorant ofisar 3	Vorant ofisar 2	Vorant ofisar 1
English translation	Chief warrant officer	Warrant officer-4	Warrant officer-3	Warrant officer-2	Warrant officer-1

Prior to 2024, on rank slides, the insignia for warrant officers were displayed horizontally.

== Other ranks ==
The rank insignia of non-commissioned officers and enlisted personnel.

Rank group	Senior NCOs							Junior NCOs		Enlisted
Maldives National Defence Force										No insignia
Dhivehi	ސާރޖަންޓް މޭޖަރ އޮފް އެމްއެންޑީއެފް	ކޮމާންޑް ސާރޖަންޓް މޭޖަރ	ސާރޖަންޓް މޭޖަރ	ފަސްޓް ސާރޖަންޓް	ސާރޖަންޓް ފަސްޓް ކްލާސް	ސްޓާފް ސާރޖަންޓް	ސާރޖަންޓް	ކޯޕްރަލް	ލާންސް ކޯޕްރަލް	ޕްރައިވެޓް
Malé	Saarjant meyjar of emendeeef	Komaand saarjant meyjar	Saarjant meyjar	Fast saarjant	Saarjant fast klaas	Staaf saarjant	Saarjant	Koapral	Laans koapral	Praivet
English translation	Sergeant major of MNDF	Command sergeant major	Sergeant major	First sergeant	Sergeant first class	Staff sergeant	Sergeant	Corporal	Lance corporal	Private
