= Mohamed Khaleel =

Maldivian diplomat

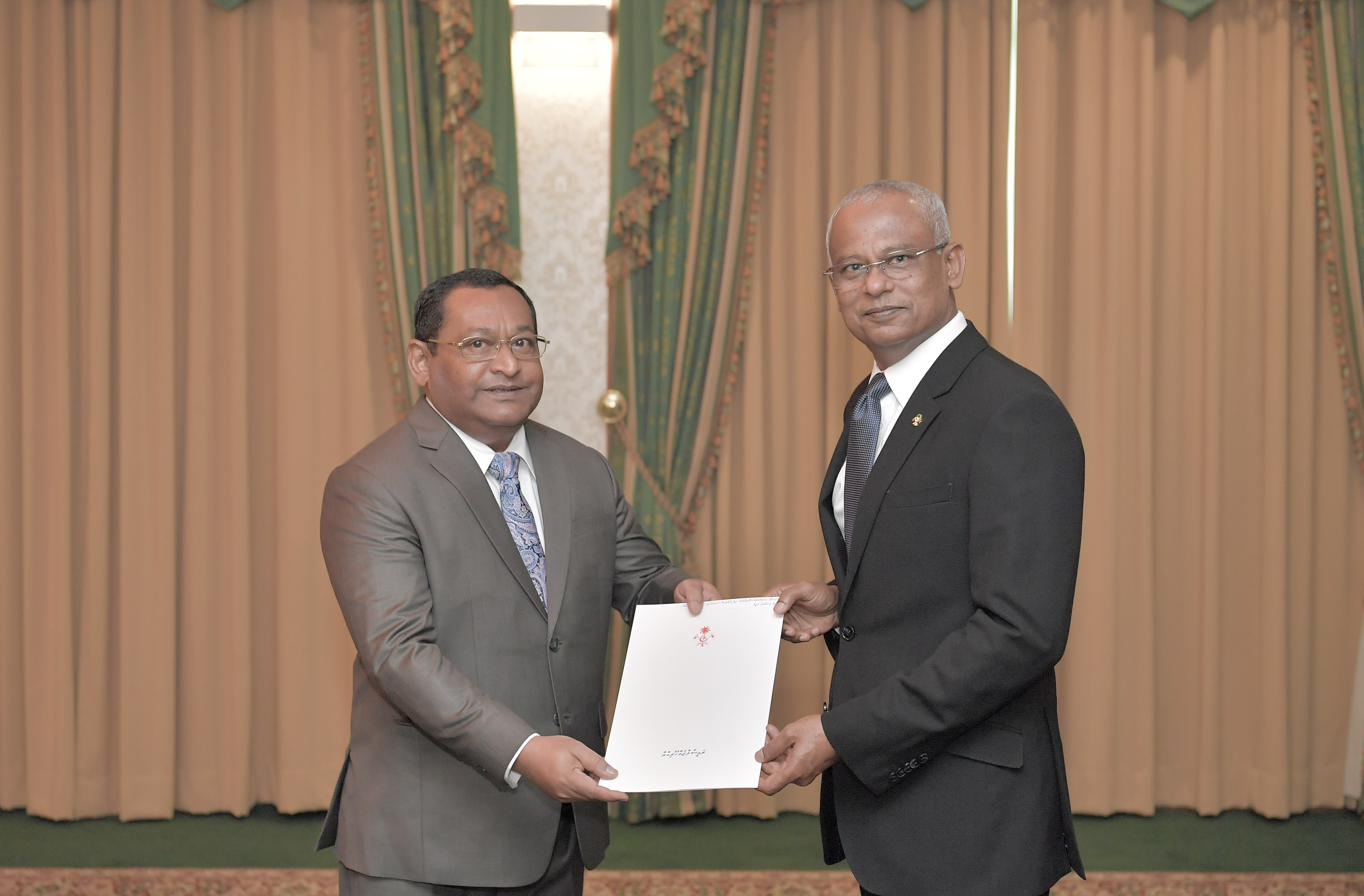
Ambassador-elect Mohamed Khaleel (left) receives the letter of credentials addressed to the King of Saudi Arabia from President Ibrahim Mohamed Solih (right) (June 2019)

Mohamed Khaleel (Dhivehi: މުޙައްމަދު ޚަލީލް, Arabic: محمد خليل born 29 October 1965) is a Maldivian diplomat.

== Career ==
In 1983, after completing his secondary education at Majeediyya School in his hometown of Malé, he became a government official.

In 1994, he received a degree in Environmental Law and Political Science from Jawaharlal Nehru University, where he studied abroad. In 1995, he received training in Environmental Management in Japan.

From 2002 to 2008, he served as Director of the Singapore Office and deputy director of the Maldivian Office at the Maldivian Government Trade Center.

He was a high commissioner to Singapore (Ambassador level) from 2008 to 2014.

On 16 June 2019, he was appointed Ambassador to Saudi Arabia by President Ibrahim Mohamed Solih. On October 23 of the same year, he presented his credentials to King Salman of Saudi Arabia.

On 10 July 2019, he was appointed non-resident Ambassador to Kuwait and Ambassador to Jordan. On 5 December 2021, he presented his credentials to King Abdullah II of Jordan.

On 27 November 2019, he was appointed as a non-resident Ambassador to Oman. On February 18, 2021, he presented his credentials to Sultan Haitham of Oman.

On 17 August 2020, he was appointed as a non-resident ambassador to Bahrain. On August 25, 2021, he presented his credentials to King Hamad of Bahrain.

On February 15, 2021, he was appointed as the first non-resident ambassador to Palestine.

Political offices
Preceded by Abdullah Hameed	Ambassador of the Maldives in Saudi Arabia; 2019-	Succeeded by Incumbent
Preceded by Abdullah Hameed	Ambassador of Maldives to Kuwait; 2019-	Succeeded by Incumbent
Preceded by First	Ambassador of Maldives to Jordan; 2019-	Succeeded by Incumbent
Preceded by First	Ambassador of Maldives to Oman; 2019-	Succeeded by Incumbent
Preceded by First	Ambassador of the Maldives to Bahrain; 2020-	Succeeded by Incumbent
Preceded by First	Ambassador of Maldives to Palestine; 2021-	Succeeded by Incumbent
Preceded by Hassan Sobir	High Commissioner of the Maldives in Singapore; 2008-2014	Succeeded by Fatimath Inaya
