= Victory Day (Maldives) =

National holiday in the Maldives

Victory Day ނަޞްރުގެ ދުވަސް
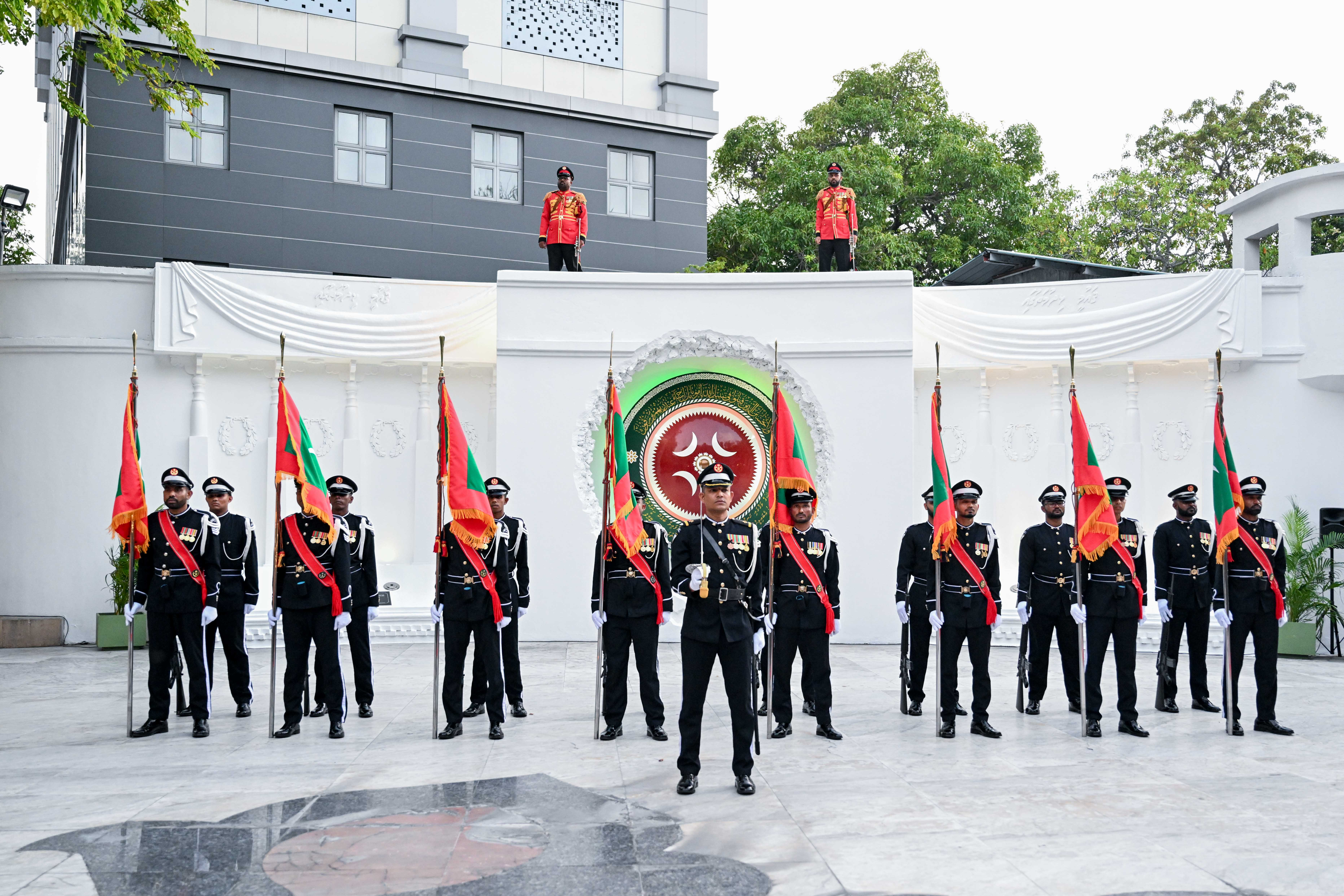
- Flag hoisting at 1988 November 3 National Monument in Maldives held on Victory Day 2025
- Observed by: Maldives
- Type: National
- Celebrations: Flag hoisting, parades, speeches by the president
- Date: 3 November
- Next time: 3 November 2026
- Frequency: Annual
- Started by: Maumoon Abdul Gayoom
- Related to: 1988 Maldives coup attempt

Victory Day (Dhivehi: ނަޞްރުގެ ދުވަސް) is a public holiday in the Republic of Maldives held annually on November 3. It commemorates the failure of a coup attempt in 1988, when a group of Maldivian rebels, supported by Tamil mercenaries from the People's Liberation Organization of Tamil Eelam (PLOTE), attempted to overthrow the government of then-president Maumoon Abdul Gayoom.

== History ==
On 3 November 1988, an attempted coup was launched against the Maldivian government, then headed by President Maumoon Abdul Gayoom. The coup involved Maldivian dissidents working with the People's Liberation Organization of Tamil Eelam (PLOTE), a Tamil militant group from Sri Lanka. Early in the morning, around 80 mercenaries infiltrated Malé, the capital of the Maldives, seizing strategic government buildings and communication centers in an attempt to capture President Gayoom, assassinate him and overthrow his administration.

President Gayoom, evading capture, reached out to nearby countries for assistance. India responded promptly by initiating Operation Cactus, deploying its military forces to the Maldives. Indian troops arrived in Malé within hours, successfully overpowering the mercenaries and reestablishing control, bringing the coup attempt to a swift end.

Victory Day was subsequently designated on November 3 to commemorate the defence of Maldivian sovereignty. The day honors those who safeguarded the nation's independence and underscores the importance of unity and security in the face of external threats.

== Celebrations ==
- The president of the Maldives addresses the nation
- Flag hoisting
- Awarding ceremonies
- Military display activities
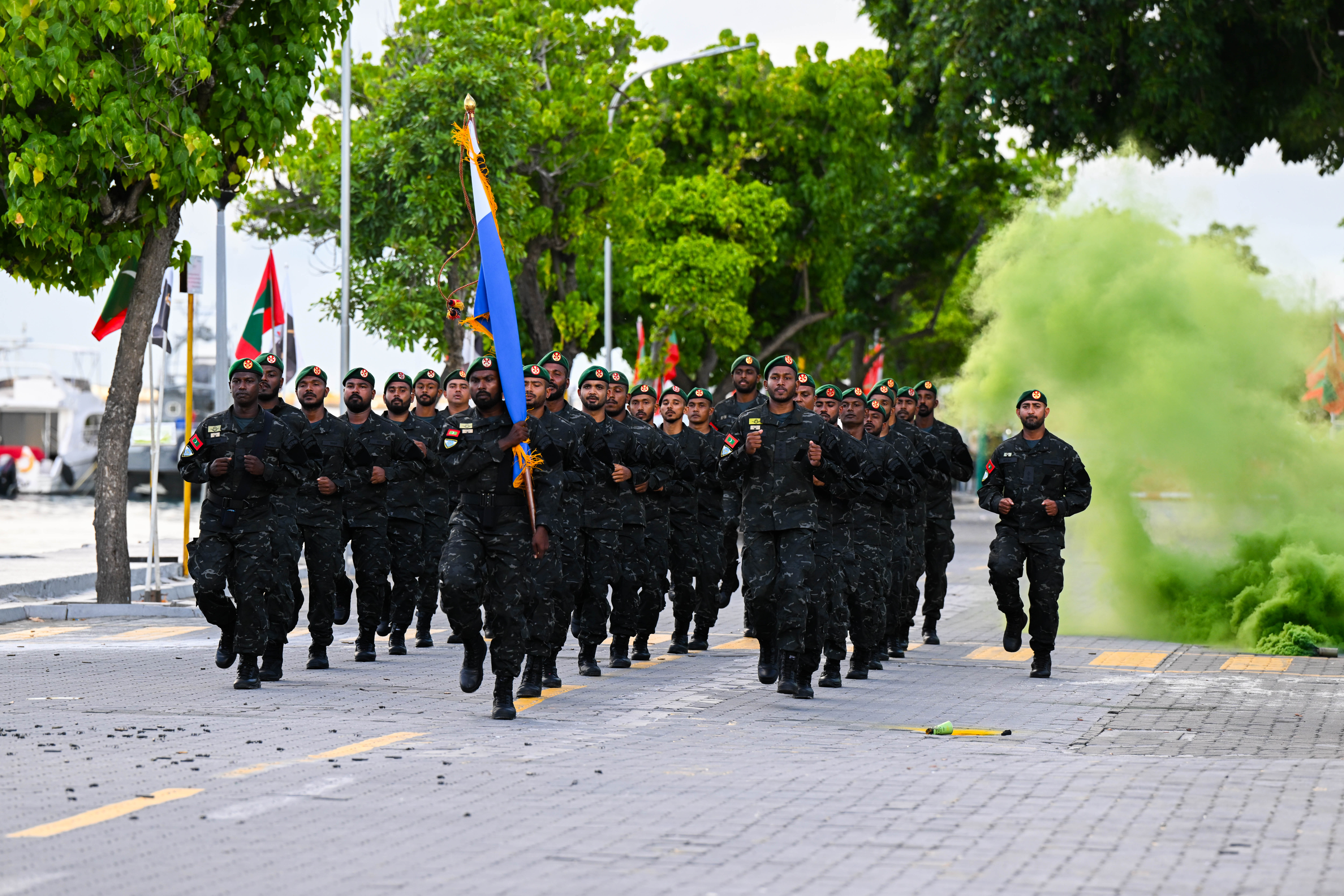
  MNDF military display to celebrate Victory Day in the Maldives in 2024
