= 3rd November Medal =

Award from the 1988 Maldives coup attempt

3rd November medal
- Medal
- Type: Medal with ribbon
- Awarded for: Battling against insurgents during the 3 November 1988 terrorist attack
- Country: Maldives
- Presented by: The president of the Maldives
- First award: 1988

The 3rd November Medal is a medal given to those who have shown bravery and excellence during the 1988 Maldives coup attempt.

== Recipients ==
Name	Ref
Hussain Adam	
Moosa Ali Jaleel	
Abdul Raheem Abdul Latheef	
Mohamed Nazim	
Ibrahim Hilmy	
Ibrahim Ali	
Umar Mohamed	
Mohamed Ali	
Qasim Moosa	
Mohamed Haneef	
