= Hassan Rasheed (politician) =

Maldivian government official

- ޙަސަން ރަޝީދު
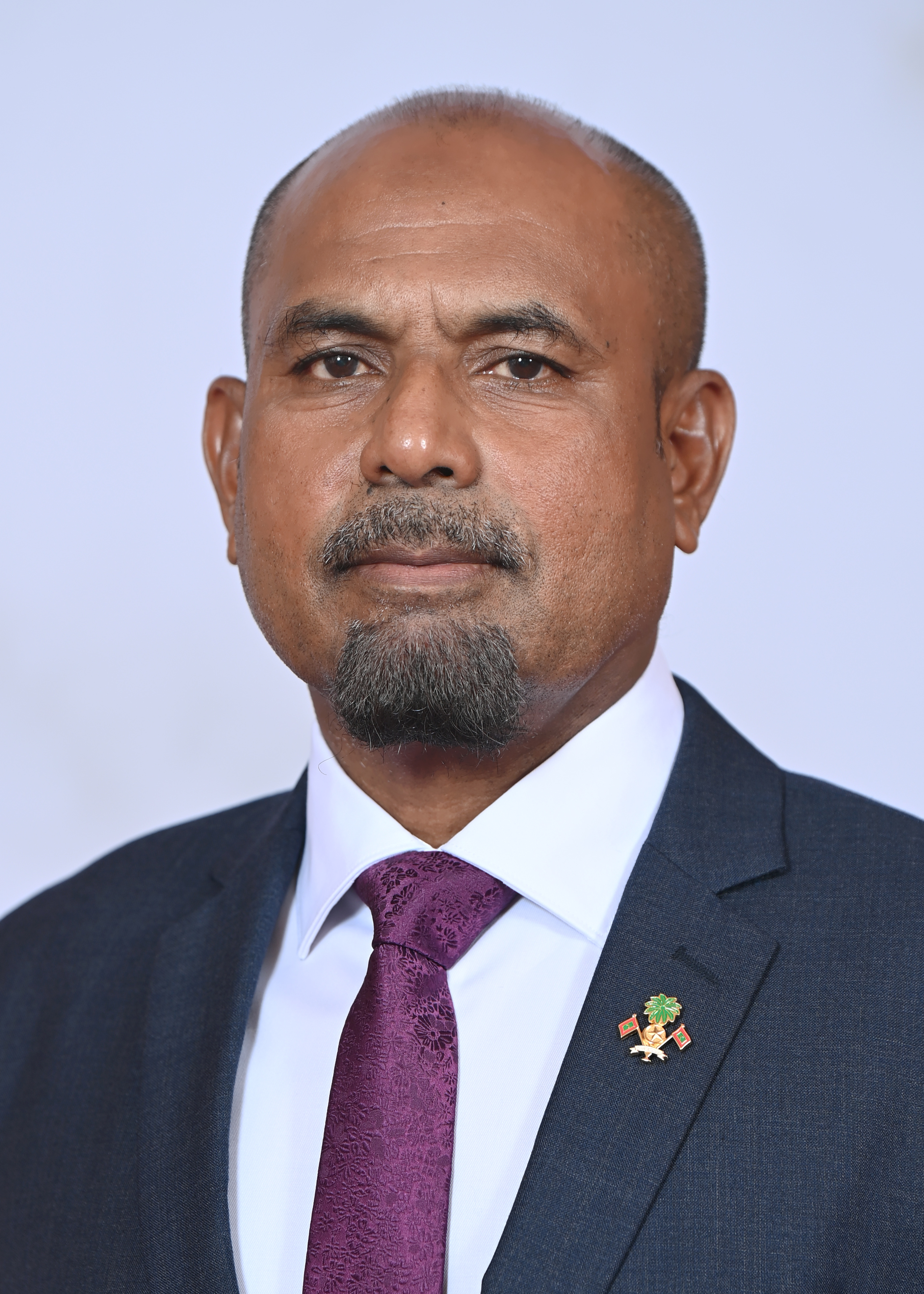
- Official portrait, 2026

Minister of Defence and National Service
- Incumbent
- Assumed office 14 April 2026
- President: Mohamed Muizzu
- Preceded by: Mohamed Ghassan Maumoon

Hassan Rasheed (Dhivehi: ޙަސަން ރަޝީދު) is a Maldivian politician who served as Minister of Defence and National Service of the Maldives since 2026.

== Career ==
Rasheed served as the Minister of State at the Ministry of Housing from 21 November 2023 until his appointment as the Minister of Defence and National Service in 2026.
