= Special Forces (Maldives) =

MNDF Special Forces
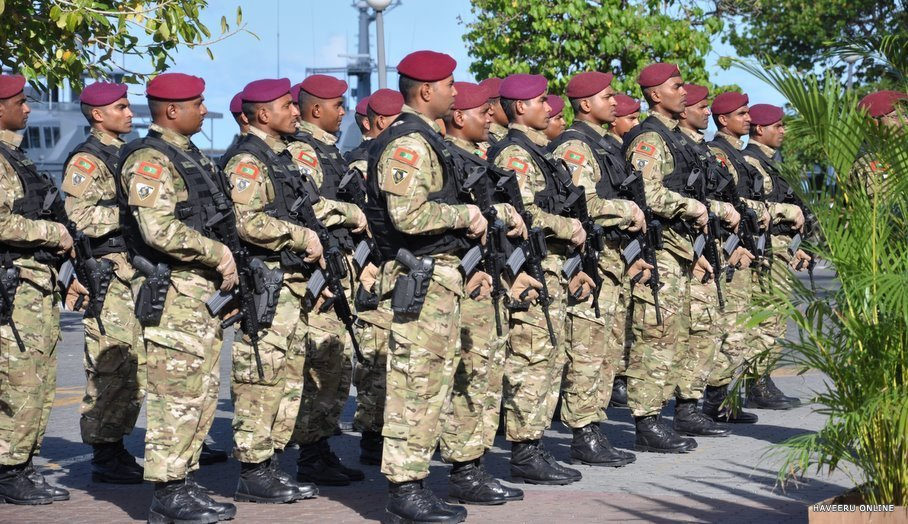
- Special Forces of the Maldives National Defence Force
- Founded: 2008
- Country: Maldives
- Type: Special forces
- Part of: Maldives National Defence Force
- Motto: The Few The Brave
- Colours: Multicam or Black

Commanders
- Commander: Lieutenant Colonel Ahmed Rasheed

Insignia
- Identification symbol: Maroon beret and regimental badge

The Special Forces (SF) branch of the Maldives National Defence Force is the elite Special Forces unit which is capable of planning and conducting a broad range of special operations.

== History ==
The MNDF Special forces was inaugurated on October 27, 2009 after the realization of the requirement of the need of an extremely specialized and well trained group of elite soldiers were necessitated to combat and defend against all internal and external threats to national security and implement the national interests of the Government of Maldives within and abroad the territory of Maldives. The SF unit is equipped with the latest and the most modern military technology and trained consistently as a significant amount of money is invested in keeping this lethal unit most effective while performing their functions.

=== Operation Dolphin ===
"Operation Dolphin" was the first major operation carried out by the Special Forces since it was founded. A combat team travelled to Gan. The primary task of the operation was to handle the security of all VIPs who would attend the 17th SAARC summit in Addu and also to carry out counter-terrorism operations.

In order to prepare for this operation, the Special Forces carried out joint training programmes in the Maldives and abroad with US Army Special Forces.

== Selection and training ==
The Special Force have a wide variety of unique special operations skills, attained through a high level of training. All the SF operatives are carefully handpicked from other branches of Maldives National Defence Force through a series of excruciating and vigorous qualification process. The SF undergoes an intense yearlong calendar cycle of scrupulous special forces training which demands stringent physical agility, psychological well-being, intelligence and exemplary military discipline. They also take pride in frequent cross training with foreign elite forces such as the US Army Special Forces, the US Navy Seals, the Special Service Group of Pakistan, the British SAS, the Para sf of Indian army and, the Army Commandos and Special Force Regiment of Sri Lanka. All SF operatives are mandated to master High-altitude military parachuting, demolition, endurance training, para training and advanced weapons skills. SF also specializes on marksmanship, slithering, diving and other special ops tactical skills. On the whole, a profound emphasis is placed on physical fitness and skill training so that the each member will be able to withstand the rigors of real time tactical operations.

Very little is known of the exact process and components of the strenuous year long training which takes part in different military bases in Maldives for the SF. The training of the SF remains top secret and almost all the processes involved in SF training remains confidential.

== Firearms ==
- Belgium: Browning Hi-Power
- USA: M1911 pistol
- Germany: Heckler & Koch MP5
- USA: M4 carbine
- Sweden: Carl Gustaf 8.4cm recoilless rifle
- Soviet Union: RPG-7
- Russia: AK-103
- Switzerland: SIG Sauer P226
- United Arab Emirates: CMP 9
- United Arab Emirates: CSR 817
- Soviet Union: AK-47
- Soviet Union: PK machine gun
- USA: M2 Browning
- United Arab Emirates: CSR 50
- Belgium: FN MAG
- USA: Barrett MRAD
- USA: M24 Sniper Weapon System
- Russia: PKP machine gun
- United States Serbu Super-Shorty

== See also ==
- MNDF Marine Corps Special Operations Group
- MNDF Coast Guard Special Boat Squadron
