= Chief of Defence Force (Maldives) =

Chief of the Defence Force
- ޗީފް އޮފް ޑިފެންސް ފޯސް
- Emblem of the MNDF

- Flag of the MNDF

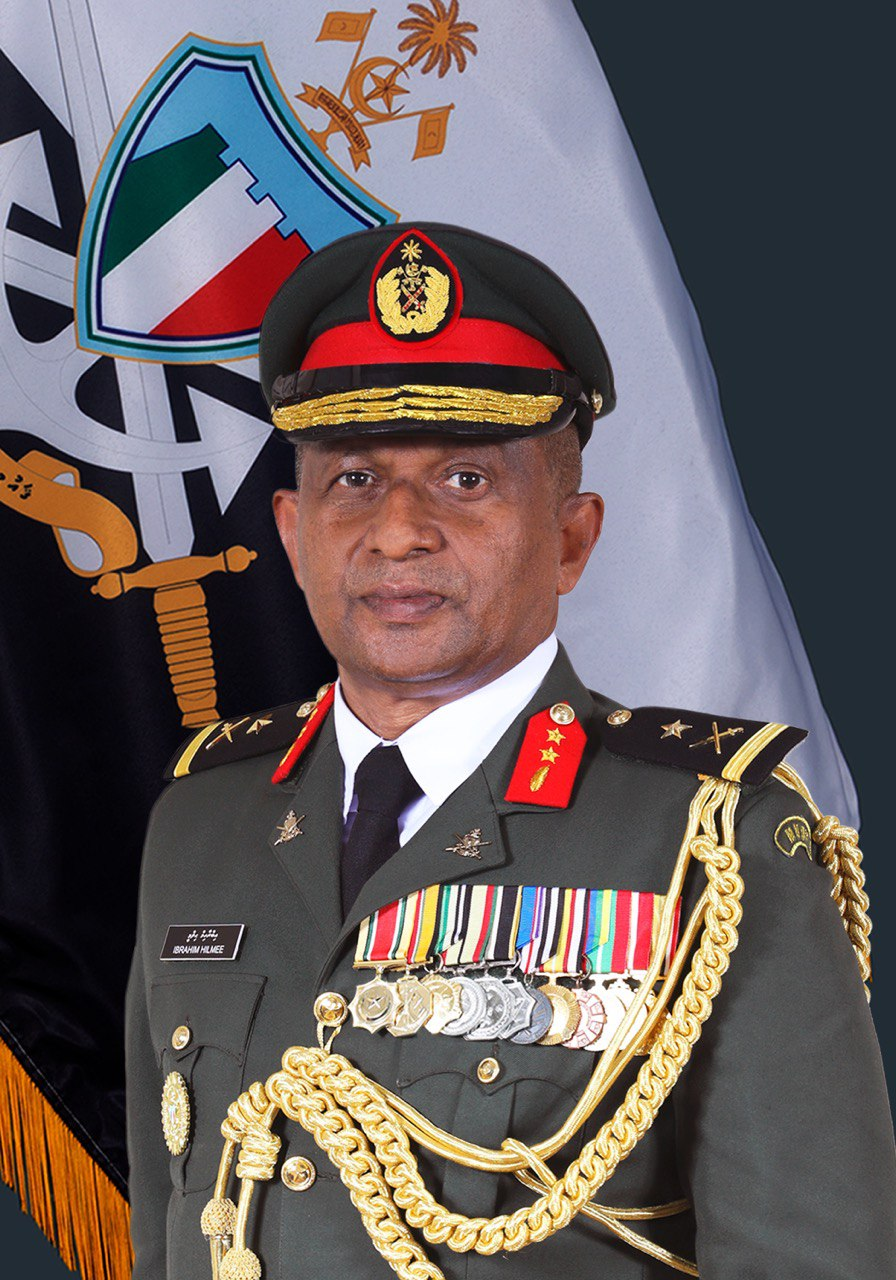
- Incumbent; Major General Ibrahim Hilmy since 17 April 2024
- Maldives National Defence Force
- Reports to: Minister of Defence
- Appointer: President of the Maldives
- Formation: 21 April 1992
- First holder: Lieutenant General Abdul Sattar Adam
- Deputy: Vice Chief of Defense Force
- Website: mndf.gov.mv

The Chief of Defence Force (Dhivehi: ޗީފް އޮފް ޑިފެންސް ފޯސް) is the highest-ranking military officer of in the Maldives National Defence Force, who is responsible for maintaining the operational command of the military.

== List of chiefs ==
No.	Portrait	Chief of the Defence Force	Took office	Left office	Time in office	Ref.
1	Abdul Sattar Adam	Lieutenant General; Abdul Sattar Adam	21 April 1992	1 January 1996	3 years, 255 days	.
2	Mohamed Zahir	Major General; Mohamed Zahir	1 January 1996	18 November 2008	12 years, 322 days	
3	Moosa Ali Jaleel	Major General; Moosa Ali Jaleel (born 1960)	18 November 2008	7 February 2012	3 years, 81 days	
4	Ahmed Shiyam	Major General; Ahmed Shiyam	9 February 2012	11 December 2018	6 years, 305 days	
5	Abdulla Shamaal	Lieutenant General; Abdulla Shamaal (born 1969)	11 December 2018	17 November 2023	4 years, 341 days	
6	Abdul Raheem	Lieutenant General; Abdul Raheem (born 1964)	17 November 2023	17 April 2024	152 days	
7	Ibrahim Hilmy	Major General; Ibrahim Hilmy (born 1969)	18 April 2024	Incumbent	2 years, 186 days	
