= Abdulla Shamaal =

Maldives brigadier general (born 1969)

Lieutenant General Abdulla Shamaal
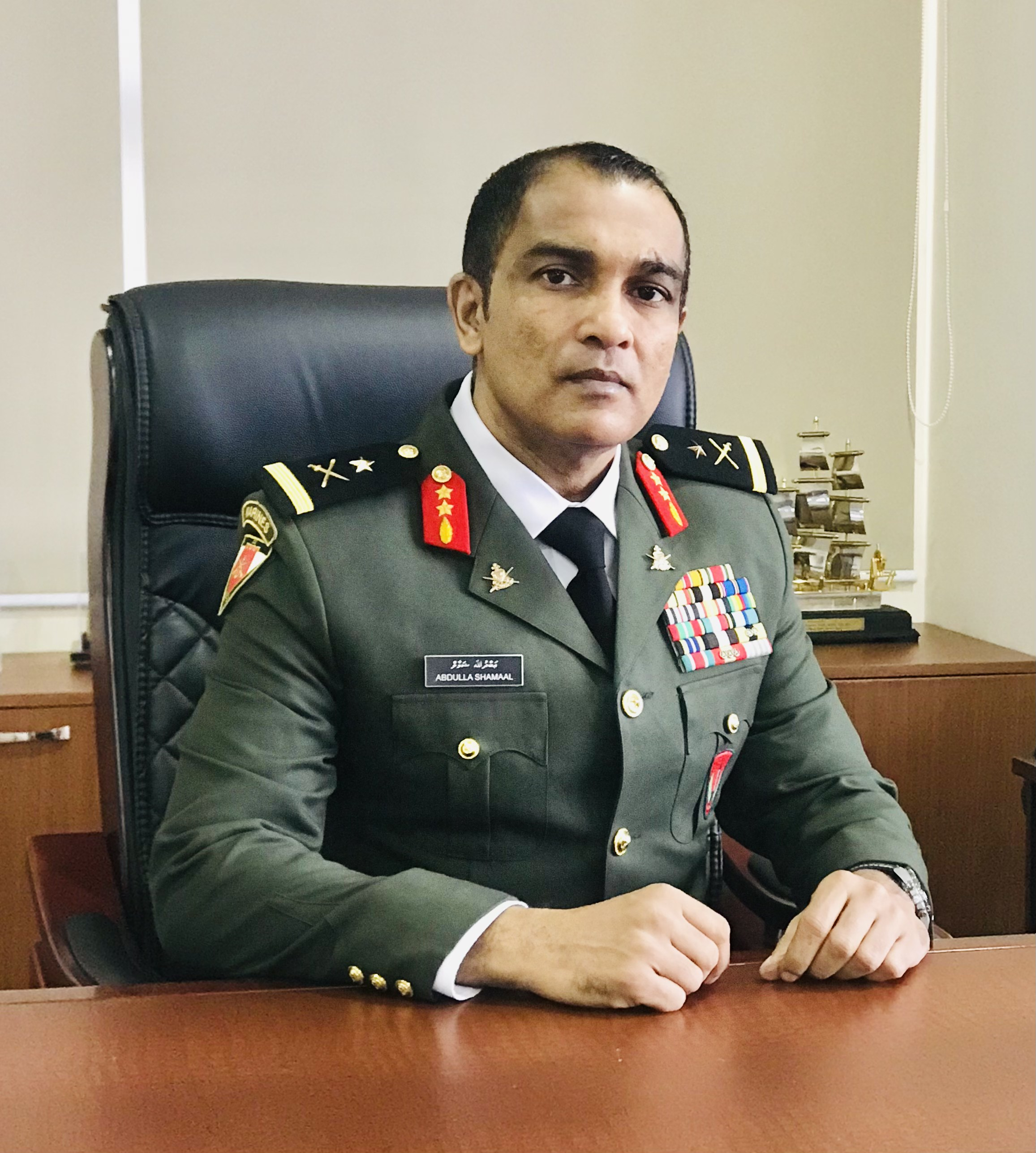
- Born: 5 July 1969 (age 57)
- Military career
- Allegiance: Maldives
- Branch: Maldives National Defence Force
- Rank: Lieutenant General
- Commands: Chief of Defence Force

Lieutenant General (retd) Abdulla Shamaal MA MSc ndu psc (born 5 July 1969) is the former Chief of Defence Force (CDF) of Maldives National Defence Force (MNDF). General Shamaal was appointed to the post of Chief of Defence Force on 11 December 2018 by President Ibrahim Mohamed Solih and served until 17 November 2023. Shamaal was trained in various military institutions such as the United States Army Infantry School in Fort Benning, the Pakistan Military Academy and the Defence Services Staff College in India. Shamaal was previously discharged from service in November 2013 but was reinstated in December 2018 following High Court verdict that his discharge was unlawful. He has also held various Senior Command, Staff and Instructional appointments during his career.

== Academic qualifications ==
- Master of Arts Degree (MA) in Defence and Security Analysis (1999), University of Lancaster, UK
- Master of Science Degree (MSc) in Defence and Strategic Studies (2003), University of Madras, India
- Master of Arts Degree (MA) in Strategic Security Studies (2012), Distinguished Honor Graduate, National Defense University, Washington DC, US

== Military training ==
- Military Officers Cadet Training at the Pakistan Military Academy (1992 -1994)
- Infantry Officers Basic Training (1996) and Infantry Officers Advance Course (2000) at the US Army Infantry School, Fort Benning, Georgia
- Graduate of Defence Services Staff College, India (2003)
- Graduate of Asia Pacific Center for Security Studies, Hawaii, USA (2009)
- Completed Special Task Force Training (1991)
- Completed NCO Cadre Training (1992)

== Achievements ==
- In June 2012, Gen. Shamaal graduated from the Counter Terrorism Fellowship post graduate program at the National Defence University (NDU) in Washington DC, obtaining a Master of Arts Degree in Strategic Security Studies – his third master's degree. He had the privilege of graduating as a Distinguished Honor Graduate of the course, receiving distinctions in all the electives, with a GPA of 4.0, and his thesis was nominated as an honour thesis at NDU.
- Gen. Shamaal had the privilege of serving as the country's first Military Attaché in a diplomatic mission abroad. He served as a Defence Adviser in the Maldives High Commission in New Delhi from March 2005 to December 2008, and set up the first DA's office in India.
- Gen. Shamaal was awarded the Best Allied Cadet at the Pakistan Military Academy, and was the first Maldivian Officer to be trained in Pakistan Military Academy.
- In March 2012, Gen. Shamaal had the privilege of being the first Maldivian to be inducted to the United Nations Roster of Senior Experts on Security Sector Reform (SSR).

== Decorations ==
Shamaal has been decorated with the Distinguished Service Medal, Presidential Medal, Dedicated Service Medal, Defence Force Service Medal, Good Conduct Medal, three November Medals and Centenary Medal.

== Family ==
He is married to Fathimath Firasha, and has three daughters, Fathmath Yasmeen Shamaal, Aishath Yara Shamaal and Aminath Emma Shamaal.

== Other work highlights ==
In the period of 2009 to 2010, Gen. Shamaal also had the opportunity to take the initiative and play a key role in drafting and educating political leaders and security managers on the National Security Framework envisioned in the Strategic Action Plan of the President's Office of the Maldives.

With the transformation to a multi -party democracy in the Maldives in 2008, with the aim of aligning the armed forces with a democratic system, Shamaal helped the Ministry of Defence draft the new strategic vision for the armed forces – the Strategic Defence Directive (SDD) in May 2009. The aim of the SDD was to conceptualise the national security related policy and the defence structure of the country. It was the first explicit defence policy document written in the country's history which gave policy, strategic and doctrinal guidance to the defence establishment.

Shamaal also has the honour of being a senior member of the team that represented the presentation of the claim on the Maldives continental shelf at the United Nations HQ in New York, in March 2011. Later, he was also a senior member of the defence team that represented Maldives at the Department of Peacekeeping Operations, where they formally indicated the Maldives’ desire to take part in the UN peacekeeping operations in the future. His office in the Defence Ministry initiated and drafted the project for the soldiers to take part in the peacekeeping operations.

With the assistance from the United States government, and other countries, he has been able to host and coordinate several workshops and forums to educate and train the broader security community, practitioners and the political elite in the country on the need to create integration, participation and synergy within security agencies, and facilitate the democratisation and nation-building process.
