= 1988 Maldives coup attempt =

Coup attempt thwarted with Indian assistance

1988 Maldives coup d'état attempt
- Part of Indian Intervention in the Sri Lankan civil war
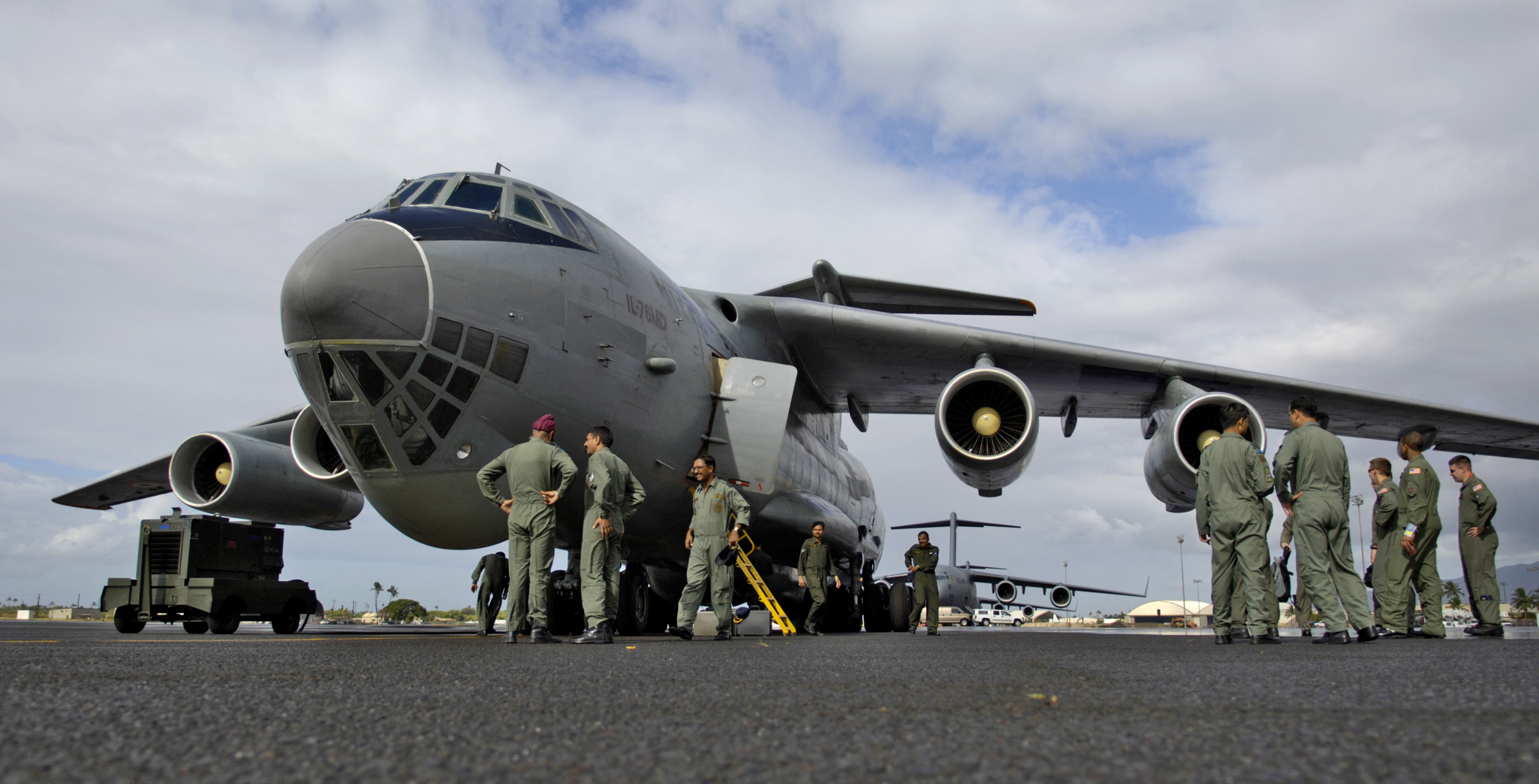
- Indian Air Force Ilyushin Il-76 planes like this one were used in Cactus. (This image was taken at an unrelated location in Hawaii, United States decades after 1988.)
Date	3 November 1988
Location	Maldives, Indian Ocean
Result	Indian-Maldivian victory: Coup failed

Belligerents
India; Maldives	People's Liberation Organisation of Tamil Eelam (Maldives) Maldivian rebels

Commanders and leaders
(India) R. Venkataraman (India) Rajiv Gandhi (Maldives) Maumoon Abdul Gayoom (India) Vice Admiral S.V.V. Gopalachari (India) Brigadier Farouk Bulsara (India) Colonel Subhash Joshi (India) Major (later Brig) Rupinder Dhillon (India) Major (later Lt Gen) Vinod Bhatia	Uma Maheswaran; Wasanti † (Maldives) Abdullah Luthufi (POW) (Maldives) Sagaru Ahmed Nasir (POW) (Maldives) Ahmed Ismail Manik Sikka (POW)

Units involved
Indian Armed Forces; Indian Army; Parachute Regiment; Indian Navy; Indian Air Force; Maldives National Defence Force	Unknown

Strength
500 Indian paratroopers Maldives National Defense Force	100 to 200 mercenaries

Casualties and losses
19 killed (8 NSS), 39 injured (18 NSS). 4 hostages killed, 3 hostages unaccounted for No casualties occurred during the operation carried out by PARA SF (India) from Indian Side.	Most of the mercenaries were killed and some were captured. 27 hostages taken, 20 were retrieved. 4 killed and the other 3 unknown.

The 1988 Maldives coup d'état attempt was an attempt by a group of Sri Lankans and Maldivians led by businessman Abdullah Luthufee and assisted by armed mercenaries of a Tamil secessionist organization from Sri Lanka, the People's Liberation Organization of Tamil Eelam (PLOTE), to overthrow the government of the Republic of Maldives. The attempt was thwarted with Indian assistance in Operation Cactus.

== Coup attempt ==
Whereas the 1980 and 1983 coup d'état attempts against Maumoon Abdul Gayoom's presidency were not considered serious, the third coup d'état attempt in November 1988 alarmed the international community.

On 3rd November 1988, 100 to 200 PLOTE mercenaries arrived by sea in Malé, and attempted to capture the NSS headquarters, the radio and television center, and the presidential palace. They may also have captured the airport.

President Gayoom went into hiding and requested for help from the United States, the United Kingdom, India, Sri Lanka, Malaysia, and Singapore for assistance.

When he contacted the United States,he was told that it would take US forces 2–3 days to reach the Maldives from their nearest military base in Diego Garcia, 1,000 km away. The president then contacted the United Kingdom, which advised them to seek assistance from India.

Following this, Gayoom contacted the Indian government for assistance. India swiftly accepted their request and an emergency meeting was arranged at the Secretariat Building in New Delhi by Prime Minister Rajiv Gandhi alongside Commanders of the Indian Armed Forces. Within 16 hours of the SOS, India was ready to commence their operation.

== Operation Cactus ==
Rejaul Karim Laskar, a member of the then-ruling political party in India, Indian National Congress, stated that India's intervention in the attempted coup became necessary as in the absence of Indian intervention, external powers would have been tempted to intervene or even to establish bases in Maldives, which being in India's backyard would have been detrimental to India's national interest. India, therefore, intervened with "Operation Cactus".

The operation started on the night of 3 November 1988. Two Ilyushin Il-76 aircraft of the Indian Air Force, escorted by six Mirage 2000s airlifted the Strike Force of the 50th Independent Parachute Brigade(India), commanded by Brigadier Farukh Bulsara and comprising the 6th Battalion of the Parachute Regiment (India), A Company of 3 Para Battalion, 51 Battery of 17 Para Field Regiment, Field Platoon of 411 Para Sappers, Airborne ADS of 60 Para Field Ambulance and the Signalers of 50(I) Para Brigade Signal Company in the first wave from Agra Air Force Station and flew them non-stop over 3707 kilometers to land them over the Malé International Airport on Hulhule Island and 7 Para Battalion in the second wave of 50(I)Parchute Brigade on 4 November 1988 to Malé International Airport on Hulhule Island. The Indian Army paratroopers arrived on Hulhule in nine hours after the appeal from President Gayoom.

The Indian paratroopers immediately secured the airfield, crossed over to Malé using commandeered boats and rescued President Gayoom. The paratroopers restored control of the capital to President Gayoom's government within hours. Some of the mercenaries fled toward Sri Lanka in a hijacked freighter named MV Progress Light. Those unable to reach the ship in time were quickly rounded up and handed over to the Maldives government. Nineteen people reportedly died in the fighting, most of them mercenaries. The dead included two hostages killed by the mercenaries. The following day, Indian Naval Air Arm Il-38s and Tu-142s from INAS 315 found the ship sailing towars Sri Lanka. The Indian Navy frigates INS Godavari and INS Betwa, aided by their embarked Sea Kings along with the training vessel INS Tir intercepted the freighter off the Sri Lankan coast. When two hostages were killed by LTTE, the ships opened fire, with Godavari using her AA guns and Betwa her 4.5inch guns. A Breguet Alize flying from INS Garuda dropped two depth charges in a show of force prior to ship being boarded by MARCOS who captured the mercenaries. The swift intervention by the Indian military and accurate intelligence successfully quelled the attempted coup d'état in the island nation.

== Reaction ==
India received international praise for the operation. United States President Ronald Reagan expressed his appreciation for India's action, calling it "a valuable contribution to regional stability". British Prime Minister Margaret Thatcher reportedly commented, "Thank God for India. President Gayoom's government has been saved." But the intervention nevertheless caused some disquiet among India's neighbors in South Asia.

== Aftermath ==
In July 1989, India repatriated the mercenaries captured on board the hijacked freighter to Maldives to stand trial. Gayoom commuted the death sentences passed against them to life imprisonment under Indian pressure.

The 1988 coup d'état had been headed by a once prominent Maldivian businessperson named Abdullah Luthufi, who was operating a farm in Sri Lanka. Former Maldivian President Ibrahim Nasir was accused, but denied any involvement in the coup d'état. In July 1990, Gayoom officially pardoned Nasir in absentia in recognition of his role in obtaining Maldives' independence.

The operation also strengthened Indo-Maldivian relations as a result of the successful restoration of the Gayoom government.

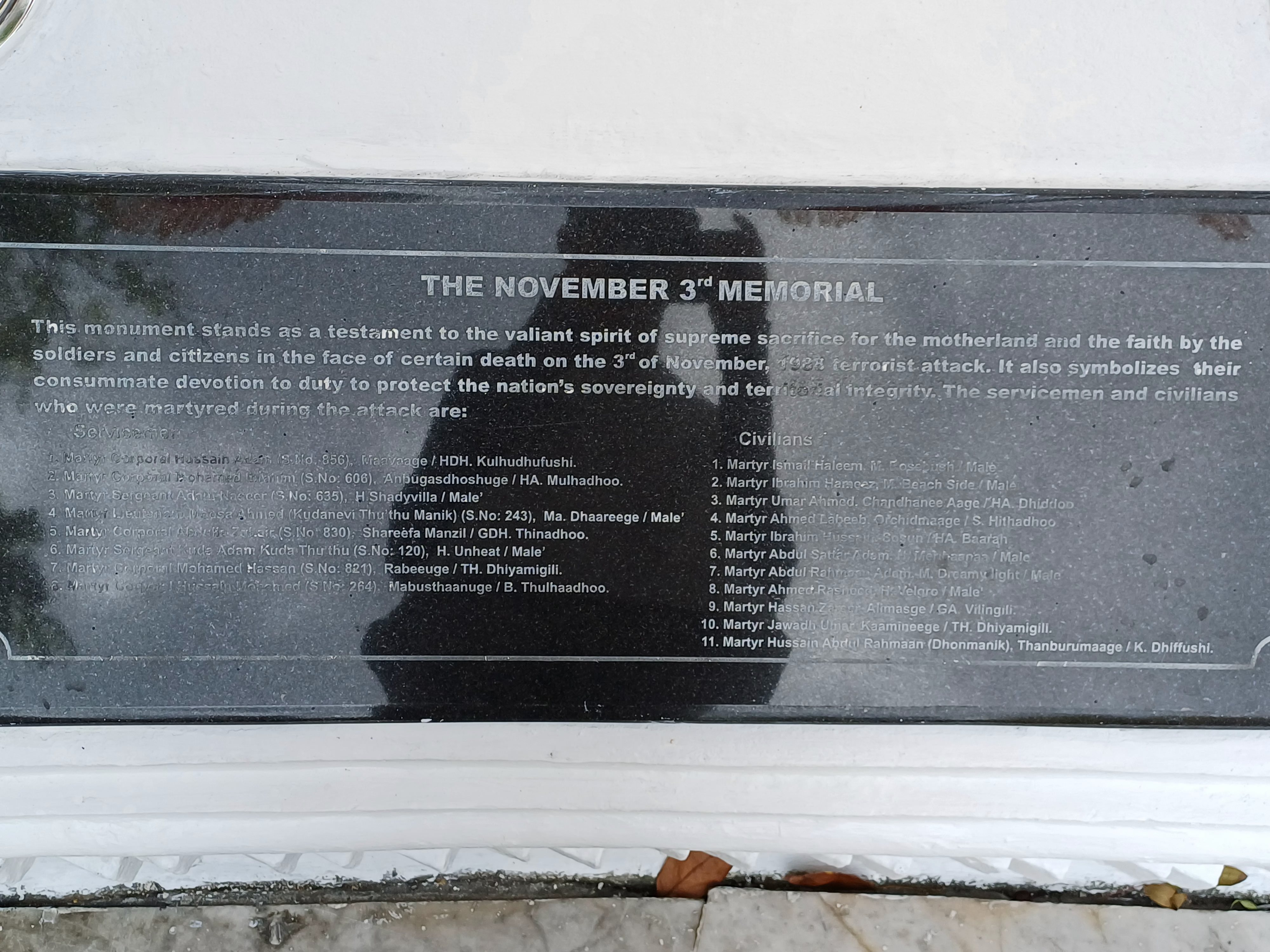
List of Martyrs of the coup attempt

== Published accounts ==
=== Documentaries ===
Operation Cactus: How India Averted Maldives Crisis in 1988 (2018) is a TV documentary which premiered on Veer by Discovery Channel series, Battle Ops.

== See also ==
- 3rd November medal
- Mohamed Zahir
- Moosa Ali Jaleel
- Hussain Adam
- Liberation Tigers of Tamil Eelam
- Victory Day (Maldives)
