= Maldives National Defence Force =

National Military of the Maldives

- ދިވެހިރާއްޖޭގެ ޤައުމީ ދިފާއީ ބާރު (Dhivehi)
- Emblem

- Flag
- Motto: Defending & safeguarding the Maldivian state, territory, exclusive economic zone & the people, with pride, sense of responsibility & professionalism
- Founded: 21 April 1892; 134 years ago
- Service branches: MNDF Coast Guard; MNDF Marine Corps; MNDF Air Corps; MNDF Fire and Rescue Service; MNDF Service Corps; MNDF Defence Intelligence Service; MNDF Medical Corps; MNDF Adjutant General's Corps; MNDF Special Forces; MNDF Special Protection Service; MNDF Ordnance Service
- Headquarters: Bandaara Koshi, Malé
- Website: mndf.gov.mv

Leadership
- Commander-in-Chief: Dr. Mohamed Muizzu
- Minister of Defence and National Service: Hassan Rasheed
- Chief of Defence Force: Major General Ibrahim Hilmy
- Vice Chief of Defence Force: Brigadier General Ahmed Giyas
- Sergeant Major of MNDF: Nasrulla Waseem

Personnel
- Military age: 18–24 (Note: Voluntary service for individuals aged 18–24; no conscription; requires a 10th grade education or equivalent; political party membership is prohibited (2024))
- Conscription: None
- Active personnel: 9900+
- Reserve personnel: 7800+
- Deployed personnel: 2500+

Expenditure
- Budget: $183.13 million | MVR 2.82 billion (2026)

Industry
- Foreign suppliers: India; China; Sri Lanka; Turkey; United States; Germany; Russia; France; United Kingdom

Related articles
- Ranks: Military ranks of Maldives

The Maldives National Defence Force (MNDF; Dhivehi: ދިވެހިރާއްޖޭގެ ޤައުމީ ދިފާއީ ބާރު, romanized: Dhivehi Raajjeyge Qaumee Dhifaaee Baaru) is the national military responsible for defending the security and sovereignty of the Maldives. It is primarily responsible per the constitution to defend and protect the country, its territorial integrity, its exclusive economic zone (EEZ) and the people. Its branches include the Maldivian Coast Guard, MNDF Marine Corps, MNDF Air Corps, and MNDF Fire and Rescue Service.

== History ==
The Maldives has a recorded history of human habitation spanning over 25 centuries. Throughout its substantial history, the country has maintained its status as a sovereign and independent nation; with the exception of 2 time periods — an occupation by the Portuguese Empire the 16th century and in 1887 to 1965 as a British protectorate. Despite the small size, humble population, and significant geographically strategic value, the Maldives has preserved its freedom though dexterous diplomacy and selfless sacrifice of many Maldivian heroes who fought to defend the nation.

Origins of the Maldivian military began with the campaign for the expulsion of the Portuguese forces let the by the national hero As-Sulṭaan al-Ghaazee Muhammad Thakurufaanu al-A'uẓam who raised the first known organized military body referred to as the "Hagu beykalun". However while this did mark the birth of a structured defense force, the modern military institution was formally established by As-Sulṭaan Ibrahim Nooraddeen on 21 April 1892 by the name of "Sifain".

Over the following century the military underwent many institutional reforms. Till 1979 it was called the National Guard and under the Ministry of Public Safety. 1979 onward the forces was reformed as the National Security Service (NSS) and as part of the Ministry of Defense and National Security. For several decades the police force was an integral part of NSS until 1 September 2004 — when it was decreed to be renamed as Maldives Police Service and as a separate civil entity under the Ministry of Home Affairs.

The final significant transition happened on 21 April 2006 — the 114th anniversary; when it was renamed as the Maldives National Defense Force (MNDF) and the force structure was reorganized and modernized with the introduction of the Marine Corps, the expansion of the Coast Guard fleet, and the move towards the modern joint operational philosophy.

== Force structure ==
=== Combat and maneuver forces ===
- Maldivian Coast Guard
- MNDF Marine Corps
- MNDF Air Corps
- MNDF Fire and Rescue Service

=== Support services ===
- MNDF Service Corps
- MNDF Defence Intelligence Service
- MNDF Medical Corps
- MNDF Adjutant General's Corps

== Operational and functional organization ==
=== Area commands ===
- MNDF Northern Area Command
- MNDF Malé Area Command
- MNDF Central Area Command
- MNDF Southern Area Command

=== Functional commands ===
==== MNDF Special Forces ====
- Special Forces (Maldives)
- MNDF Special Protection Service
- MNDF Ordnance Service: The Ordnance Service is currently commanded by Brigadier General Hassan Shahidh.

== Rank structure ==
The ranking system of the MNDF is based on the traditional British military system and U.S. military system. The highest flag rank ever awarded was that of lieutenant general, in a non-military capacity to the previous Defence Minister Abdul Sattar, although the president being the commander in chief also holds the rank of general in a non-military capacity.

=== Serving general officers ===
- Major General Ibrahim Hilmy - Chief of Defence Force
- Brigadier General Ahmed Ghiyas Vice Chief of Defence Force
- Brigadier General Ismail Shareef - Commander, MNDF Northern Area Command
- Brigadier General Abdulla Zuhury - Commandant, MNDF Marine Corps
- Brigadier General Dr. Ali Shahid Mohamed - Surgeon General, MNDF Medical Corps
- Brigadier General Abdul Rauf - Commandant, MNDF Air Corps
- Brigadier General Ibrahim Rasheed - Commander, MNDF Male' Area Command
- Brigadier General Mohamed Ibrahim - Commander, MNDF Central Area Command
- Brigadier General Abdulla Ibrahim - Commanding Officer, College of Defence and Security Studies (CDSS)
- Brigadier General Hassan Shahid - Director General, J3 IHQ
- Brigadier General Mohamed Saleem - Commandant, Coast Guard
- Brigadier General Hussain Ibrahim - Director General, DIDC
- Brigadier General Ahmed Thohir - Commandant, MNDF Fire & Rescue Service
- Brigadier General Ismail Naseer - Commandant, MNDF Service Corps
- Brigadier General Hussain Fairoosh - Director General, Defence Intelligence Service
- Brigadier General Hussain Ali - Adjutant General, Adjutant General's Corps

=== Retired general officers ===
- Lieutenant General Ambaree Abdul Sattar ^{1} (Deputy Commander in Chief of Armed Forces from 21 April 1992 – 1 January 1996)
- Major General Mohamed Zahir (Chief of Defence Force from 1 January 1996 – 18 Nov 2008)
- Major General Moosa Ali Jaleel ^{5} (Chief of Defence Force from 18 Nov 2008 – 7 February 2012 )
- Major General Adam Zahir (Commissioner of Police) ^{2}
- Major General Ahmed Shiyam (Former Chief of Defence Force)
- Brigadier General Ahmed Shahid (Former Vice Chief of Defence Force)
- Brigadier General Farhath Shaheer (Former Vice Chief of Defence Force)
- Brigadier General Ahmed Shahid (Former Vice Chief of Defence Force)
- Brigadier General Ahmed Naeem Mohamed
- Brigadier General Zakariyya Mansoor - Director General of Counter-Terrorism, Ministry of Defence
- Brigadier General Ibrahim Mohamed Didi
- Brigadier General Ahmed Mohamed (former Vice Chief of Defence Force )
- Brigadier General Ali Zuhair (former commander of Coast Guard)
- Lieutenant General Abdulla Shamaal ( Former Chief of Defence Force)
- Major General Hamid Shafeeq

(Former Commandant, MNDF Service Corps)

- Major General Wais Waheed

(Former Commandant, MNDF Marine Corps)

- Lieutenant General Abdul Raheem Abdul Latheef (Former Chief of Defence Force)
- Brigadier General Mohamed Shareef (Former Commandant of MNDF fire and rescue)

=== Dismissed general officers ===
- Colonel Ahmed Nilam^{4}

== Notes ==
- ^{1} Ambaree Abdul Sattar is the first person to have held lieutenant general rank and also served as the Minister of State for Defence.
- ^{2} Adam Zahir held the rank of major General from 29 April 2004 to 1 September 2004 prior to the appointment as Commissioner at Maldives Police Service.
- ^{4} Colonel Ahmed Nilam held the rank of brigadier general before he was demoted and dismissed from the service. He was dismissed for failing to act according to the responsibilities, conduct and rules of MNDF.
- ^{5} Moosa Ali Jaleel is the only person who has served as both the Minister of Defence and Chief of Defence Force.
- ^{6} Abdul Raheem Abdul Latheef held the CDF post for the shortest tenure (From 17 November 2023 - 17 April 2024) due to compulsory retirement upon reaching 60 years of age as per the MNDF Act. He previously served as the Vice Chief of Defence Force from 11 December 2018 to 17 November 2023.

== See also ==
- MNDF Coast Guard
- MNDF Marine Corps
- MNDF Special Forces
- Maldives Police Service
- MNDF Air Corps
