= Jeffrey W. Hornung =

American political scientist

- Education: Marquette University (BA), Johns Hopkins SAIS (MA), George Washington University (PhD)
- Occupation: Political scientist
- Employer: RAND Corporation

Jeffrey W. Hornung is an American political scientist currently serving as Japan Lead for the National Security Research Division at the RAND Corporation and an adjunct professor at Georgetown University.

== Education ==
Hornung holds a BA in political science from Marquette University, a MA in international relations from Johns Hopkins University SAIS, and a PhD in political science from George Washington University.

== Career ==
Prior to joining RAND, Hornung was an associate professor at the Asia-Pacific Center for Security Studies.

== Publications ==
=== Reports ===
- Inflection Point: How to Reverse the Erosion of U.S. and Allied Military Power and Influence, RAND Corporation, July 25, 2023 (co-authored with David A. Ochmanek, Anna Dowd, Stephen J. Flanagan, Andrew R. Hoehn, Michael J. Lostumbo, and Michael J. Mazarr)
- Like-Minded Allies? Indo-Pacific Partners' Views on Possible Changes in the U.S. Relationship with Taiwan, RAND Corporation, July 20, 2023 (co-authored with Miranda Priebe, Bryan Rooney, Patrick Hulme, Nobuhiko Tamaki, and Yu Inagaki)

=== Articles ===
- America's Best Friend in Asia, Foreign Affairs, April 10, 2024
- Separate U.S. Alliances in East Asia Are Obsolete, Foreign Policy, September 11, 2023 (co-authored with Christopher B. Johnstone)
- Japan's new security policies: A long road to full implementation, Brookings Institution, March 27, 2023 (co-authored with Adam P. Liff)
- Japan's Long-Awaited Return to Geopolitics, Foreign Policy, February 6, 2023
- What the United States Wants From Japan in Taiwan, Foreign Policy, May 10, 2021
