= International reactions to the 2011 Bahraini uprising =

The international reactions to the 2011 Bahraini uprising include responses by supranational organisations, non-governmental organisations, media organisations, and both the governments and civil populaces of fellow sovereign states to the protests and uprising in Bahrain during the Arab Spring. The small island nation's territorial position in the Persian Gulf not only makes it a key contending regional power but also determines its geostrategic position as a buffer between the Arab World and Iran. Hence, the geostrategic implications aid in explaining international responses to the uprising in Bahrain. Accordingly, as a proxy state between Saudi Arabia and Iran, Bahrain's domestic politics is both wittingly and unavoidably shaped by regional forces and variables that determine the country's response to internal and external pressures.

== Supranational bodies ==
- The senior advisor to European Union foreign affairs chief Catherine Ashton, Robert Cooper, stated that : "The situation had in fact, from the point of view of the management of Bahrain, which is a small island, become almost intolerable. One should understand the authorities were right to restore calm and order and that's what they've done. But that is only right if it is followed by dialogue."
- (Cooperation Council for the Arab States of the Gulf) Gulf Cooperation Council member states agreed to provide Bahrain with an aid plan similar to the Marshall Plan, consisting of US$10 billion aimed at upgrading housing and infrastructure over a period of ten years. They also agreed that they would give more preference to GCC-member state nationals while hiring individuals. A statement issued on 10 March 2011 from the foreign minister of the United Arab Emirates and the GCC said it supported recent calls for dialogue from Bahrain's crown prince. Soldiers of the Peninsula Shield Force arrived in Bahrain as part of GCC efforts to quell the uprising on 14 March 2011.
- United Nations High Commissioner for Human Rights Navi Pillay said that a takeover by security forces of any medical facilities was a "blatant violation of international law. There are '[also]' reports of arbitrary arrests, killings, beatings of protesters and of medical personnel, and of the takeover of hospitals and medical centres by various security forces. This is shocking and illegal conduct." Local news sources reportedly published that Pillay admitted in June 2011 that "certain information which the UN received about developments in Bahrain is untrue", acknowledging that the situation in Bahrain was different and therefore "incomparable" to the ongoing unrest in other countries in the region. Pillay then published a statement stating that she "would like to make clear that a meeting she had [on] Friday with Bahrain's Minister of Social Development and acting health minister, Dr Fatima bint Mohammed Al Balooshi and three other Bahrain government officials, has been grossly misrepresented in a report by the Bahrain News Agency." She continued to state that the earlier report had been "picked up by a number of newspapers in the region, including the Khaleej Times and the Gulf Daily News, and even by some Sri Lankan government officials and media for their own purposes." Pillay expressed her ambition that the UNHCHR will "cooperate with the Kingdom of Bahrain to ensure the veracity of the information which reaches their Geneva-based office". Pillay also expressed optimism at King Hamad bin Isa Al Khalifa's reform projects.

== States ==
- Egypt – Foreign Minister Nabil al-Arabi appeared to support the Bahraini government's contention that the uprising was orchestrated by Iran as a threat to national security, saying on April 5, 2011 that "the stability and Arabhood of the Arab States of the Persian Gulf is a red line against which Egypt rejects any trespass". He voiced support for the GCC intervention as "giving a practical application to the concept of collective security in the Gulf region".
- Iran – The Islamic Consultative Assembly's National Security and Foreign Policy Committee issued a statement supporting the uprising, blaming the United States for ordering its "regional mercenaries" to intervene, calling for Saudi Arabia and the United Arab Emirates to immediately withdraw their forces from Bahrain, and urging serious action by the Organization of the Islamic Conference. President Mahmoud Ahmadinejad said of the intervention by Saudi Arabian and Emirati forces that "this expedition is a very foul and doomed experience, and regional nations will hold the American government responsible for this" and that "Today, we witness the degree of pressure imposed on the majority of people in Bahrain. What has happened is bad, unjustifiable and irreparable." Foreign Minister Ali Akbar Salehi discussed the crisis with the UN and Arab League chiefs. He also expressed worry over the use of violence against a "peaceful movement," while Iran also objected to the presence of foreign troops in the country. Bahrain recalled its Ambassador to Iran for "consultations." Iran responded by recalling its own ambassador to Bahrain, citing the crackdown on the mostly Shiite protesters. As well as denouncing the deployment of the Saudi-led force of Arab States of the Persian Gulf, seen as propping up the Sunni monarchy, Iran complained to the United Nations about the crackdown while also asking regional states to urge Saudi Arabia to withdraw its troops. On 19 March 2011, a group of Iranian protestors stoned the Saudi consulate in the northeastern city of Mashhad to protest against the killing of Shiites in Bahrain On 20 March, Iran summoned Bahrain's charge d'affaires and ordered the expulsion of one Bahraini diplomat.
- Iraq – Prime Minister Nouri al-Maliki stated that he was "worried that the intervention of foreign forces will complicate the issues instead of solving them". Grand Ayatollah Ali al-Sistani, who is based in Najaf, Iraq, "appealed to Bahraini authorities to stop violence against unarmed citizens," his spokesman, Hamad al-Khaffaf, said.
- Israel – Israeli Prime Minister Benjamin Netanyahu said that he was not surprised by the Saudi military intervention in Bahrain: "I think they are concerned with a possible Iranian takeover of Bahrain, which would put Iran effectively within spitting distance of the Arabian Peninsula, Saudi Arabia is working to protect its own interests. But there is a very large global interest in making sure the world's oil wells, that the largest reserves of the world's oil supply do not fall into Iranian or pro-Iranian hands."
- Kuwait – Emir Sabah Al-Ahmad Al-Jaber Al-Sabah offered to mediate in the dispute between the Bahraini government and the opposition, an offer the Shi'a political party Al Wefaq accepted, but the Bahraini government flatly rejected the Kuwaiti offer on March 28, 2011. Kuwait later sent their navy to protect Bahraini waters against any possible threat from Iran
- Lebanon – The Shia political party Hezbollah criticised the invasion by Saudi and United Arab Emirates troops. Hezbollah General Secretary Hassan Nasrallah later called the crackdown a "special injustice" and that "I ask some in the Arab and Islamic worlds: Why have you remained mum over the tyranny against our people in Bahrain, is it only because they are Shiites?" Hezbollah blamed US Defense Secretary Robert Gates, saying his visit coincided with the Bahraini crackdown. After the Bahraini government formally complained to Beirut over Hezbollah's criticism, Lebanese President Michel Sleiman called King Hamad bin Isa Al Khalifa and asked him to ensure the safety of Lebanese expatriates in Bahrain, who had reportedly expressed concern about facing potential retaliation over Nasrallah's remarks.
- Malaysia – In mid-May, 2011 Prime Minister Najib Razak volunteered Malaysian troops as part of a peacekeeping mission in Bahrain. However, Najib also voiced support for Saudi Arabia's role in the then-extant GCC intervention in Bahrain, and it was unclear whether Najib was suggesting a new peacekeeping force should be established or proposing Malaysian involvement in the Peninsula Shield Force proper to maintain security in Bahrain.
- New Zealand – Briefly touching on the events in Bahrain in a speech on August 2, 2011 Foreign Affairs Minister Murray McCully said, "On balance the glass looks half full in respect of Egypt, Bahrain and Tunisia," appearing to suggest those countries provided an example of positive changes in the "political landscape" of the Middle East.
- Oman – The Gulf sultanate took a lower-profile approach to the crisis in Bahrain than other GCC member states. However, the Omani government did support the dispatch of the Peninsula Shield Force to Bahrain, and King Hamad expressed gratitude to Interior Minister Humood bin Faisal Al Busaidi for Sultan Qaboos bin Said Al Said's "support of Bahrain's security and stability". While on his state visit to Bahrain, Al Busaidi prayed to "Allah Almighty to protect Bahrain and its people and bless it with security and stability", Bahraini media reported. However in early 2012, the Omani government appeared to support the Bahraini opposition. The Sultan told the head of the Arab League Nabil Elaraby that "the Bahraini opposition's demands are legitimate and must be fulfilled before things reach a block and difficult road".
- Pakistan – In late March, 2011 three and a half months prior to her appointment as Pakistan's foreign minister, Ministry of Foreign Affairs official Hina Rabbani Khar met with Bahraini Foreign Minister Khalid ibn Ahmad Al Khalifah and "expressed the confidence that Bahrain will be able to overcome the present difficulties in the spirit of security, peace and reconciliation", feting the monarchy's efforts to hold a national dialogue and stating Pakistan's support for "the Bahraini process of reconciliation". President Asif Ali Zardari, who enjoys a close relationship with the rulers of Bahrain, has expressed support for the Arab kingdom's government during the crisis. Speaking on behalf of the Pakistani government, Zardari said on 29 March that he was concerned about regional instability resulting from upheaval in Bahrain, a reference to protests, and that he believed in close relations between Islamabad and Manama. Pakistan also allowed several thousand retired military personnel to join the GCC intervention in Bahrain at the behest of Saudi Arabia.
- Qatar – Prime Minister Hamad bin Jassim bin Jaber Al Thani defended the Bahraini government's attempts to arrange a national dialogue as "a sincere one that should be well taken by all parties" on March 14, 2011. Qatar announced its contribution of troops to the Peninsula Shield Force expedition in Bahrain days later.
- Russia - The Russian foreign ministry issued a statement on March 23, 2012, saying that Moscow sees national dialogue in the country "as an efficient and the possible way to settle the existing problems in Bahrain's society". Russia's representative to the UN suggested on August 9 that Bahrain's crisis be added to the international organization's list of things to do.
- Saudi Arabia – A Saudi official declared that "this irresponsible going out of order will not be good for anyone; it will have much more disadvantages than advantages for the people of Bahrain". Saudi Arabia was a major contributor to the Peninsula Shield Force, the military arm of the Gulf Cooperation Council, in its intervention in Bahrain. King Abdullah, stated on 19 April 2011, "Saudi Arabia, with the help of Gulf Cooperation Council states, will always make sure of supremacy of its countries against any outer intervention". The Saudi government has sided with the leaders of Bahrain, criticising the tactics of the opposition and blaming rival power Iran for supposedly inciting and directing protests.
- Turkey – The government responded cautiously to the uprising, expressing its concerns more mildly than in the case of the uprisings in Libya and Syria. The foreign ministry issued a statement saying in part, "We appeal to all parties in Bahrain to refrain from violence." Turkish officials have welcomed what they claim are signs of willingness to reform on the part of Bahrain's rulers. In response to the GCC intervention, it defended the GCC's right to act but noted, "It is extremely worrying that violence between protesters and security forces increased in the aftermath of this deployment." Foreign Minister Ahmet Davutoğlu spoke with his counterparts in Bahrain, Iran, and Saudi Arabia in an effort to resolve the crisis through diplomacy and encouraged the Bahraini government and opposition groups to refrain from violence and engage in dialogue. Revisiting the situation in mid-May, Speaker Mehmet Ali Şahin said Turkey was satisfied with developments in Bahrain and responded to his Bahraini counterpart's expression of gratitude for Turkey's role in mediation by saying that his government would be available to step in again if needed.
- United Arab Emirates – President Khalifa bin Zayed Al Nahyan pledged the full support of the UAE to the Bahraini regime in the face of major protests. On 14 March 2011, State Minister for Foreign Affairs Anwar Gargash urged the Bahraini opposition to commit to unconditional dialogue with the government. The UAE also contributed at least 500 policemen to the GCC joint security force in Bahrain.
- United Kingdom – Foreign Secretary William Hague said he was "deeply concerned" by the "unacceptable violence" used against protesters. The British government was accused of providing arms for Arab regimes while their government were suppressing the demonstrations. It then announced that in light of the unrest it has decided to revoke some arms export licenses to Bahrain stating that "licenses will not be issued when officials judge that there is a risk that the exports may provoke regional or internal conflicts or be used to facilitate internal repression".

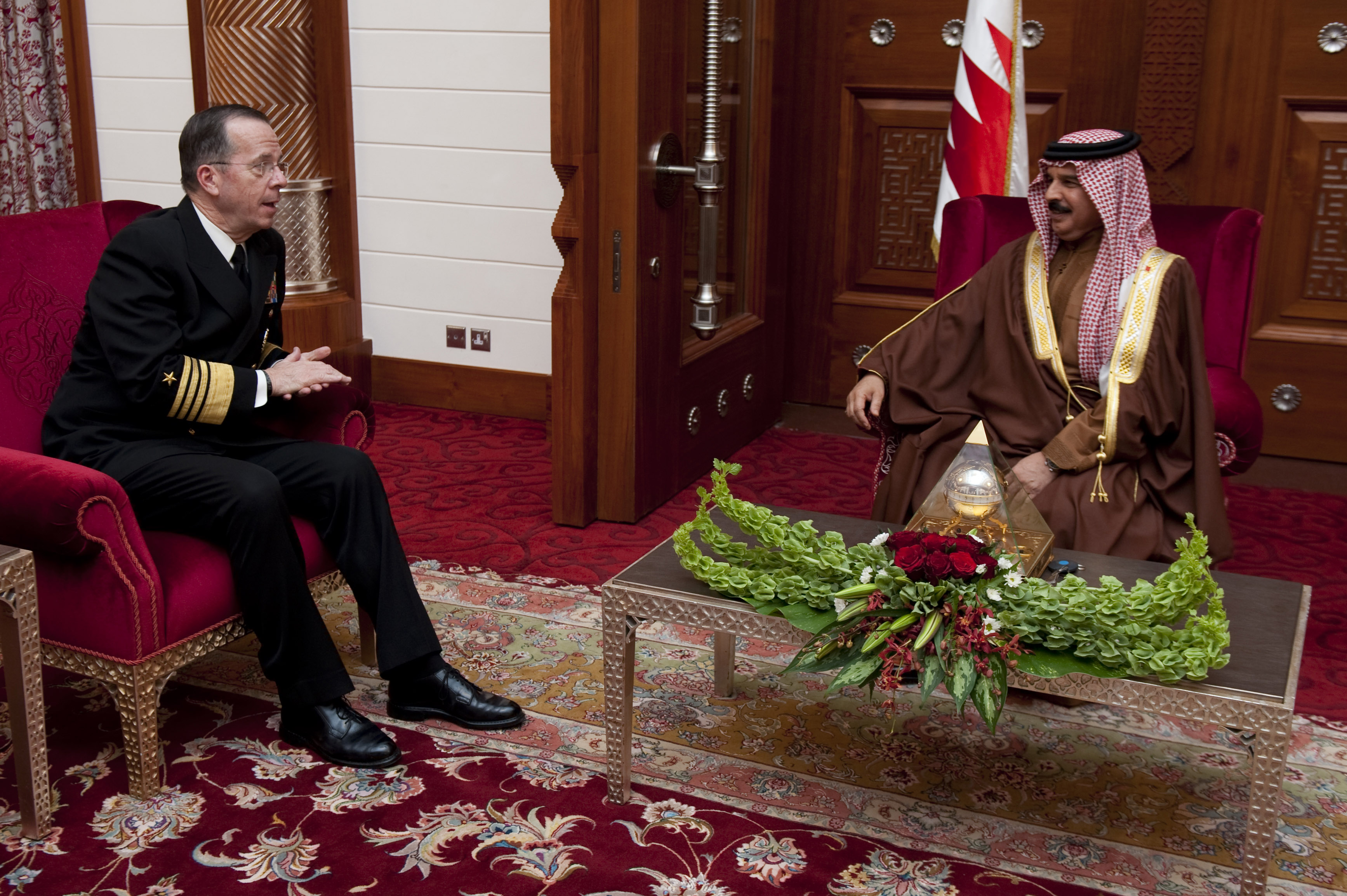
Admiral Michael Mullen, the top U.S. military officer, with King Hamad bin Isa Al Khalifa, 24 February 2011

- United States – US President Barack Obama said he was "deeply concerned" by the violence, while US Secretary of State Hillary Clinton urged restraint. On April 30, 2011, Obama spoke to the Bahraini king by phone and reportedly told him that the U.S. position is that Manama must make political reforms and respect the "universal rights" of the Bahraini people. Some media outlets reported on July 21, 2011, that the Obama administration is strongly considering closing its naval base in Bahrain, which hosts the U.S. Fifth Fleet, in favor of a new base in the Persian Gulf as a result of the crackdown and ongoing instability. The Australian quoted anonymous U.S. politicians as believing the continuing presence of the U.S. Navy in the archipelago was seen as "tacit support" for the regime, and that the U.S. government should act to dispel this popular impression by moving the base out of Bahrain. Washington swiftly denied these allegations, with both U.S. Navy and State Department officials calling the reports inaccurate. After the alleged beating of Nabeel Rajab, a leading human rights activist, in Manama by security forces, U.S. State Department spokeswoman Victoria Nuland called on Bahraini authorities, who denied culpability and said Rajab was rushed to hospital by police after being found injured in the street, to investigate the incident. "While the facts surrounding the violence that transpired remain in dispute, we strongly urge the Government of Bahrain to undertake a full investigation to determine if excessive force was employed by police," said Nuland, who also called on "all demonstrators to refrain from acts of violence and ... police and security forces also to avoid excessive use of force".
  - George Washington University Professor Hossein Askari blamed the "power of the Saudi lobby in Washington" for the failure of the American government to defend the democracy protesters in Bahrain in 2011.
- Yemen – In a phone call to King Hamad on 1 May 2011, President Ali Abdullah Saleh compared the situation in Bahrain to the uprising in Yemen and claimed they were part of "plots" to destabilize the region.

== Non-governmental organizations ==
Amnesty International, Human Rights Watch, and Physicians for Human Rights condemned the use of excessive violence against peaceful demonstrators in Bahrain. Amnesty International later released a report saying that Bahraini security forces had used live ammunition and "extreme force" on protesters without warning and that they had also impeded and assaulted medical staff who were trying to help the wounded. A medic, Hani Mowafi, who was a part of their team in Bahrain said that he "found a pattern of fatal and serious injuries during the violence in February 2011, showing that the security forces used live ammunition at close range, and apparently targeted protesters' heads, chests and abdomens. They also fired medium-to-large calibre bullets from high-powered rifles on 18 February."

Physicians for Human Rights released a report in April 2011 titled Do No Harm: A Call for Bahrain to End Systematic Attacks on Doctors and Patients, that documented attacks against medical personnel, abuses of patients and detainees, and forensic evidence of torture. The report detailed violations of medical neutrality including the abuse of physicians and patients at Salmaniya Medical Center, which was taken over by security forces on March 15, 2011. The report also described the Bahraini government's excessive use of force against civilians, including shotguns, high velocity weapons, and tear gas. PHR's report shows Bahrain's abuses in the spring of 2011 to be among the most extreme violations of medical neutrality in the past half century. Physicians for Human Rights, along with other human rights groups, pushed for a cancellation of a sale of arms from the United States to Bahrain due to its record of human rights violations.

Avaaz.org has called for sports boycotts, comparing the situation in Bahrain with that of apartheid South Africa.

Organisations in Iran launched an aid flotilla to draw attention to the "oppression" in Bahrain.

International Committee of the Red Cross Director-General Yves Daccord said on 10 August 2011 that his organisation was monitoring events in Bahrain and was "extremely concerned". Daccord added, "We are doing our utmost to ensure we have access not only to hospitals but to detention centres."

October 2015, Euro Mediterranean Human Rights Monitor has issued a press release calling Bahrain's authorities to allow freedom of speech and to free the dissidents. The monitor said that Bahrain authorities should immediately release opposition activists who have been detained for speaking out against government oppression. The monitor accused Bahrain authorities of continuing the arbitrarily punishment without due process. The monitor has documented 21 cases in which peaceful demonstrations were violently broken up by shooting live ammunition and tear gas canisters. In addition, the monitor said that 86 protesters have been detained, of whom 17 are minors, the detainees have tortured and denied a fair trial. The Euro-Med Monitor called Bahraini authorities to take more serious and committed actions to protect human rights on their territory, starting with the immediate release of the detainees, easing of restrictions on peaceful protests and permission for specialists in torture and forced disappearance to investigate conditions in Bahraini prisons.

=== Human rights reports ===
At least 13 human rights reports were issued by 18 different parties: Amnesty International, International Crisis Group, Doctors Without Borders, Physicians for Human Rights, Human Rights First, Independent Irish figures, Human Rights Watch, Human Rights Without Frontiers, Bahrain Centre for Human Rights, Bahrain Youth Society for Human Rights, Bahrain Human Rights Society, Bahrain Independent Commission of Inquiry, Arabic Network for Human Rights Information, Front Line Defenders, Gulf Centre for Human Rights, Index on Censorship, International Media Support and the Writers in Prison Committee (WiPC) of PEN International.

== Solidarity protests ==
- India – After Friday prayers, protesters in Lucknow rallied in condemnation of Saudi Arabia after Syed Kalbe Jawad said: "Saudi forces are killing innocent civilians in Bahrain only for holding anti-government demonstrations. I appeal for holding such protest in other parts of the country. Bahraini demonstrators are being killed by bullets coming from helicopters and also with poisonous gases. The people's uprising is aimed at restoring democracy and it is justifiable. Those sitting at the helm of affairs should read the writing on the wall and pave the way for democracy." He also said that should the Saudi soldiers not be withdrawn protesters would continue to agitate in the capital New Delhi. On 26 March 2011 Shiites in Mumbai and Bahraini students studying in India held a protest rally after Friday prayers to condemn the "oppressive regimes" in Bahrain and Yemen and their use of force against peaceful citizens.
- Iraq – Moqtada al-Sadr called for protests in Baghdad and Basra on 16 March 2011 to "support the Bahraini people and to denounce and condemn the murdering of innocent revolutionaries. We want to show solidarity with our brothers in Bahrain. The killing of innocents should stop."
- Pakistan - Protesters who were all affiliated with Shia organisations rallied against the Saudi invasion of Bahrain. The demonstration took place in Islamabad, Lahore, Karachi, Hyderabad, Multan, Faisalabad, Quetta and Gilgit Baltistan as well as other smaller towns. The protesters believed that the "Islamic awakening" that has swept across the Arab world would soon reach Pakistan. In the city of Lahore, Shias held a protest on 29 April 2011 against the death sentences of four men convicted of murdering two policemen during protests.
- Saudi Arabia – In the Eastern Province municipality of Qatif, several hundred Saudi Arabians protested on 18 March 2011 against Saudi involvement in the GCC military intervention in Bahrain. Protests were renewed in late April, with Iranian media reporting Saudi Arabian women holding a candlelight vigil on the night of 28 April 2011 to denounce the actions of the Bahraini government. The Saudi regime has responded to the rallies by arresting over 30 activists, the report claimed.
- United States – Reportedly close to 3,000 people marched from the Saudi Arabian embassy in Washington, D.C., to the White House on 15 April 2011 to protest the Bahraini government's treatment of protesters, the GCC military operations in Bahrain, and the perceived cautiousness with which the U.S. government has approached the alleged excesses of security forces clamping down on the uprising.

== Commercial news media ==
Qatar-based news network Al Jazeera stated that Bahrain is considered to be the country most vulnerable to unrest amongst Arab States of the Persian Gulf.

In a column dated 14 June 2011 for The Independent veteran British Middle East correspondent Robert Fisk lashed out at Bahraini and Saudi authorities over the treatment of protests and the trial of 48 medical staff on conspiracy charges. He also claimed that the Bahraini government did not invite Saudi Arabia to send troops into what he suggested should be called "Occupied Bahrain" and said the archipelago is de facto under Saudi administration, with the government supposedly complying with orders from Riyadh only to keep up appearances and save face. The Bahraini government attempted to sue Robert Fisk, but they had to withdraw their action as individuals cannot be sued for comments relating to a country under English Common Law. Fisk was however successfully sued by the Interior Minister of Saudi Arabia, Prince Nayef bin Abdulaziz Al Saud on 4 August for writing a libellous piece soon after the Bahrain article on the Saudi response to protests.

== Sports ==
Human rights protesters called for a boycott of the 2011 edition of the Bahrain Grand Prix with explicit comparisons to the sporting boycott of South Africa.

On 17 February 2011, it was announced that the second round of GP2 Asia Series, which was to be held at Bahrain International Circuit on 17–19 February, had been cancelled due to security and safety concerns surrounding the protests. On 21 February, the 2011 Bahrain Grand Prix, then due to take place on 13 March, was again cancelled because of the same concerns.

On 23 June 2011, Bahrain football federation face a membership freezing on FIFA regarding the interface of politics in football matters. FIFA asked for information of detained and sentenced footballers.

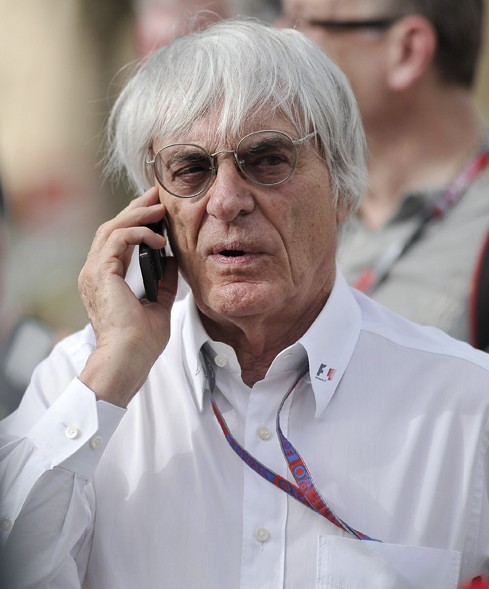
Bernie Ecclestone before the 2012 Bahrain Grand Prix

Despite political pressure on Bernie Eccelstone, the 2012 Bahrain Grand Prix was scheduled. Force India pulled out of the second practice session, fearing for its safety after a firebomb struck a car used by mechanics from the team.

== Religious ==
Qatar-based Egyptian Islamic scholar Yusuf al-Qaradawi called for the removal of the "roots of oppression" against the Shia majority and for them "to be real citizens of their country." He also criticised the protesters for what he saw as their religious sectarian nature, making reference to reports that the protesters were carrying pictures of the Iranian Supreme Leader Ayatollah Ali Khamenei and Hezbollah's Sayyed Hassan Nasrallah. He said that the protests were not supported by Sunnis in Bahrain and was thus "invalid." He talked of his friendship with the ruling Al Khalifa family and "praised" King Hamad ibn Isa Al Khalifa claiming that "the Shiites attacked Sunnis, and took over their mosques, and used weapons just like the hooligans we saw in Yemen and Egypt".

While some Shia clerics, such as Iraqi cleric Ayatollah Ali al-Sistani called for the protestors to show restraint, Iranian and Iran-backed clerics have encouraged opposition groups to continue their resistance against the regime. Hossein Vahid Khorasani said all Muslims should support the Bahraini protesters. "The oppression that is now in Bahrain...not only Shi'ah [sic] and Muslims of Bahrain...in this insurgence by foreign countries over a shelter less [sic] nation...this does not lead to any rest for Muslims...this tragedy is impossible to tell."

== Economic ==
Regional financial stock-market indices fell on 20 February 2011 on concern of spreading instability. The stock market continued to fall as protestors blocked the route into the Bahrain Financial Harbour, the country's main financial hub, prohibiting the growth of the economy and ensuring that those not involved in the protests, including expatriates, were unable to return to work. As a result, the national economy was described as the 'biggest loser' from the escalation of tensions. An opposition activist decried the damage done to the economy, saying that the blockade was done by "a small group and it's not popular".

== Evacuations and travel advisories ==
On 3 February, the British embassy stated that it was aware of plans for protests on 14 February but did not advise British citizens to "take any special steps" beyond its standard advice that included a request to "maintain a high level of security awareness" and to "avoid large gatherings, crowds and demonstrations, as a number of them have turned violent." Following expanded protests and violence, the embassy was then closed "until further notice" and a warning against travel to Bahrain was issued. On 17 March, British citizens were advised to leave Bahrain as the government sent charter planes to evacuate its citizens. The British Foreign Office also urged its citizens to buy tickets on commercial flights to leave the country if possible.

Infosys, Tata Consultancy Services and Wipro, Indian information-technology companies, withdrew their staffs from Bahrain following the three-month, state-of-emergency declaration.

== See also ==
- International reactions to the Arab Spring
- Shi'a–Sunni relations
