= Near East South Asia Center for Strategic Studies =

Agency overview
- Formed: 2000
- Jurisdiction: United States Government
- Headquarters: National Defense University Washington, D.C.
- Employees: 60 (2012)
- Agency executive: LTG (ret.) Terry A. Wolff, Director
- Parent agency: Department of Defense, Defense Security Cooperation Agency,
- Website: NESA Center

The Near East South Asia (NESA) Center for Strategic Studies is a U.S. Department of Defense institution for building relationships and understanding in the NESA region. The NESA Center supports the theater security cooperation effort of four Regional Combatant Commands: United States Central Command (USCENTCOM), United States Africa Command (USAFRICOM), United States European Command (USEUCOM), and United States Pacific Command (USPACOM) and is one of five regional centers that fall under the Defense Security Cooperation Agency. NESA was established in 2000. The NESA Center seeks to build on the strong multilateral relationships between the U.S government and its allies in the region, including regional governments and their armed forces, by focusing on broader multilateral approaches and capacity building to address regional security issues and concerns. The NESA Center is located at Fort Lesley J. McNair in Washington, DC.

== Mission statement ==
=== NESA Mission ===
To enhance security in the Near East and South Asia by building sustained, mutually beneficial relationships; fostering regional cooperation on security issues; and promoting effective communications and strategic capacity through free and candid interaction in an academic environment.

The NESA Center trains open communication and educational opportunities for military and civilian representatives from the NESA region and other participating countries. Its academic environment facilitates a cross-cultural examination of the events, ideas, and challenges that shape this critical region.

The NESA Center has implemented programs on countering ideological support for terrorism, increasing and improving strategic communication and outreach to the region, and supporting other strategic goals.

=== Achieving the NESA Mission ===
The following activities lead to achieving the core mission of developing a well-informed community of leaders and decision-makers:

- Sponsoring foundational seminars, primarily in Washington, D.C.
- Reaching a larger audience of strategic thinkers and adding depth via a robust program of local and in-region engagement activities
- Sustaining interest and promoting growth through networked outreach and alumni activities.

== Countries in the NESA Region ==
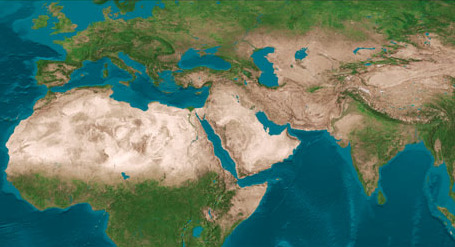
NESA Area of Engagement

1. Afghanistan
2. Algeria
3. Bahrain
4. Bangladesh
5. Egypt
6. India
7. Iraq
8. Israel
9. Jordan
10. Kazakhstan
11. Kuwait
12. Kyrgyzstan
13. Lebanon
14. Libya
15. Maldives
16. Mauritania
17. Morocco
18. Nepal
19. Oman
20. Pakistan
21. Qatar
22. Saudi Arabia
23. Sri Lanka
24. Tajikistan
25. Tunisia
26. Turkey
27. Turkmenistan
28. United Arab Emirates
29. Uzbekistan
30. Yemen

== Senior Leadership ==
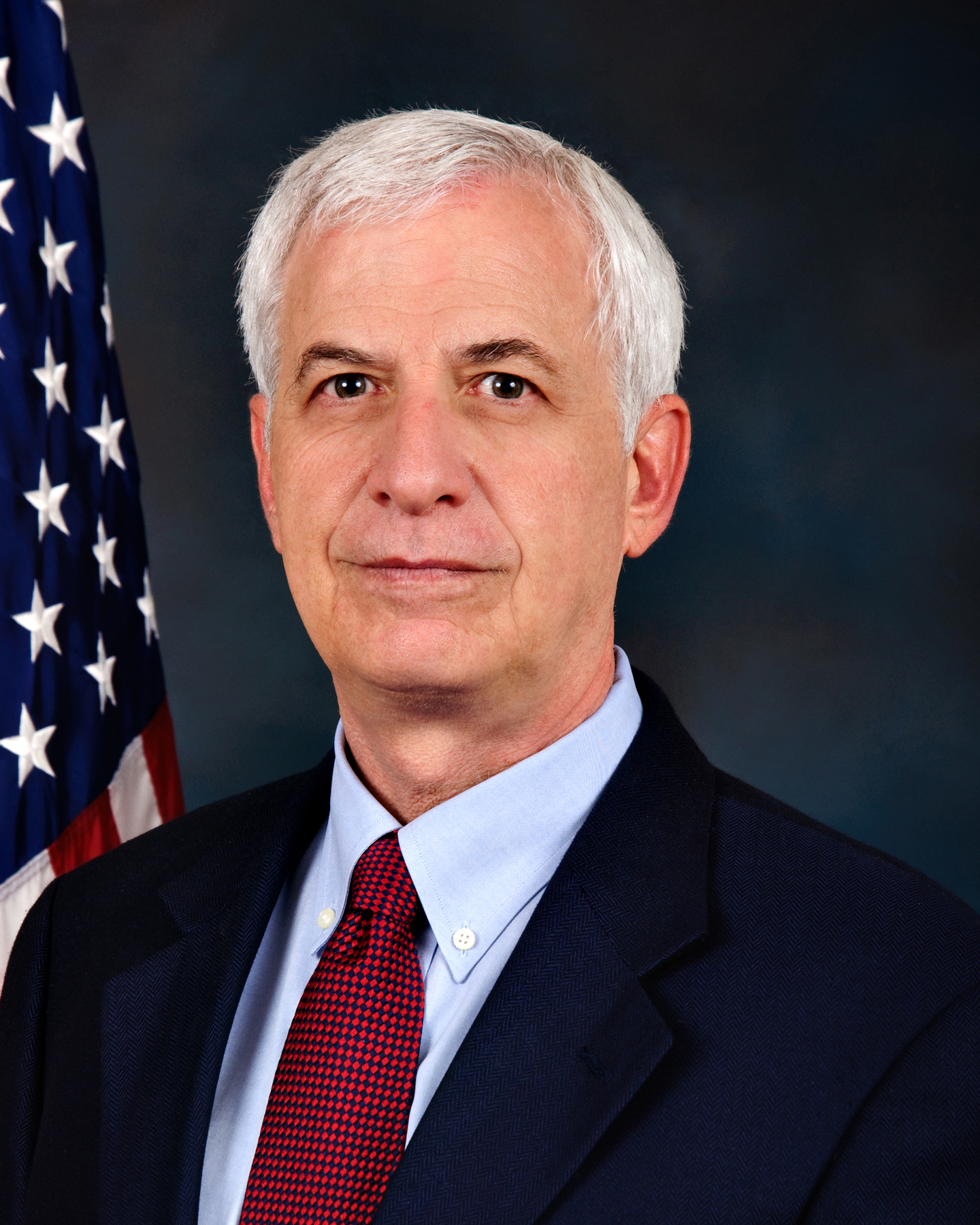
Former Director Ambassador James Larocco (ret.)

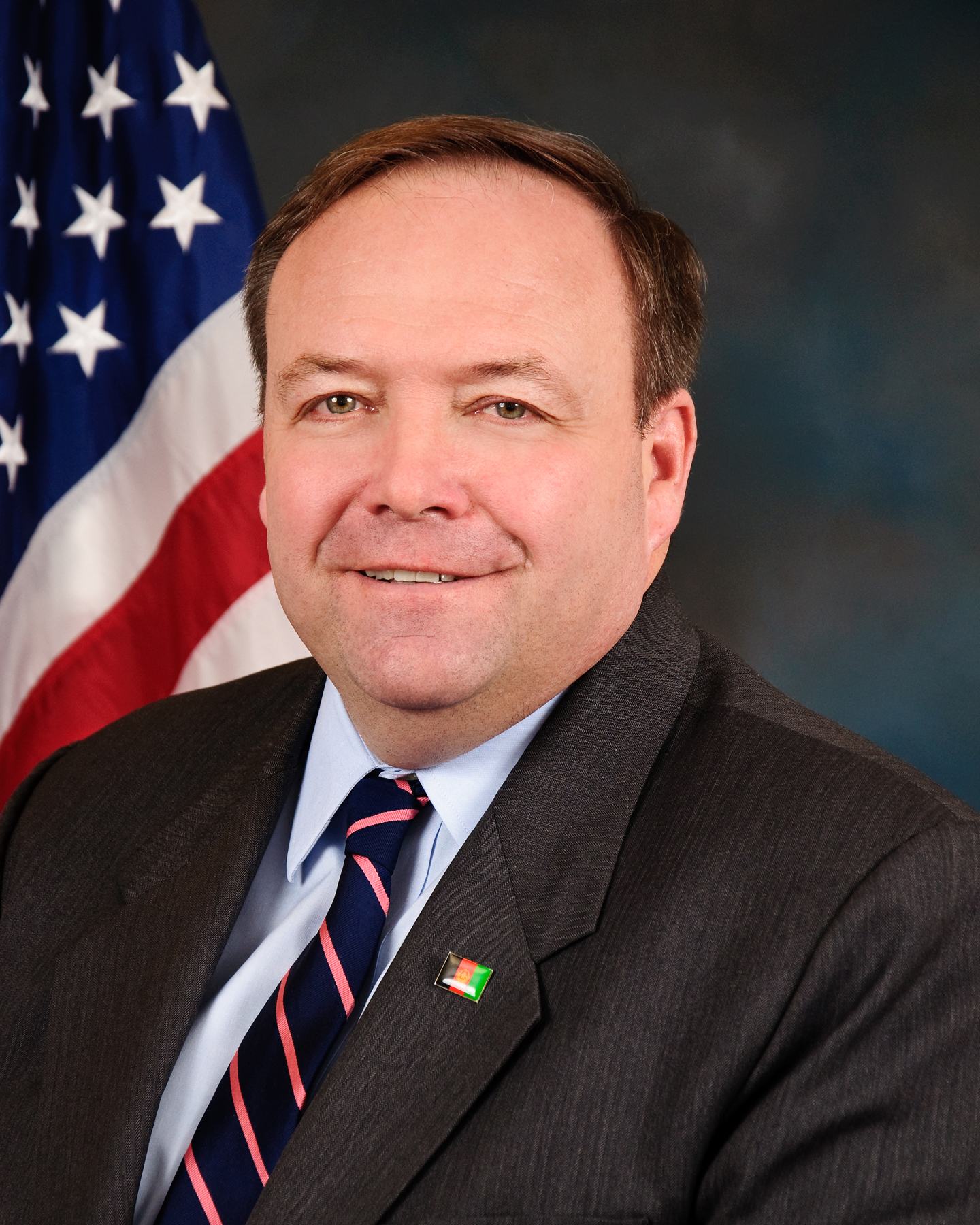
Deputy Director COL David Lamm, USA (ret.)

The Center’s senior leadership comes to NESA after established careers with institutions such as the Department of State and the United States Military. These individuals contribute their knowledge and expertise to the Center’s mission.

== Faculty ==
The NESA Center faculty represents a diverse assemblage of top-tier academics and expert practitioners from academia, diplomacy, and defense. The NESA Center's faculty comprises retired governmental, diplomatic, and military leaders from the United States and the NESA region. Professors include men and women who have served as practitioners—ambassadors, government ministers, field- and flag-grade military officers, as well as traditional university faculty.

== Outreach ==
=== Reaching Out to a Global Audience ===
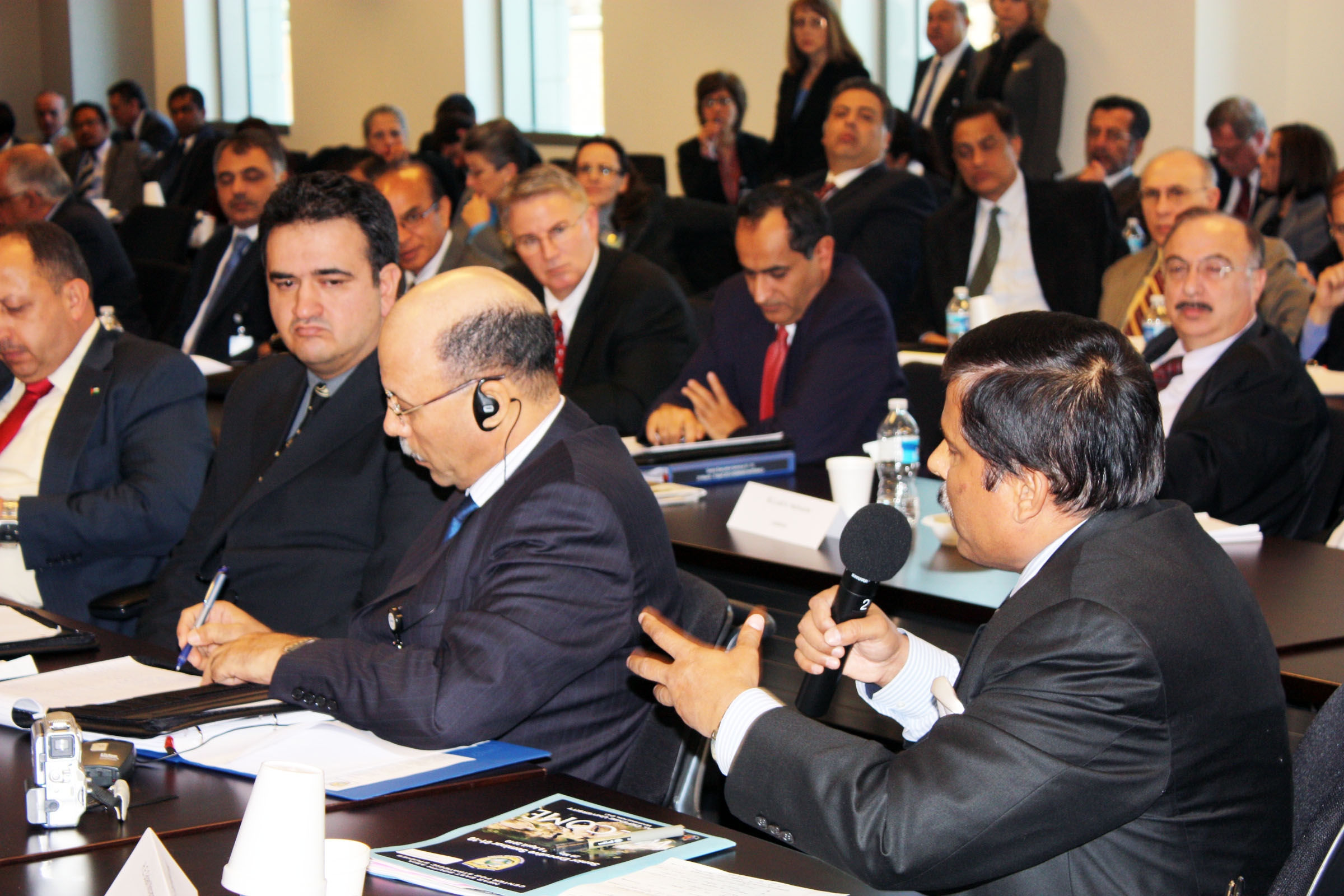
Participants in a NESA Seminar

Strategic communications and outreach are key regional center priorities. The NESA Center established an Outreach Office to coordinate all communication with:

- Points of contact in US embassies overseas and foreign embassies in Washington
- Participants before and during programs
- Alumni after they leave Washington seminars
- US government stakeholders, both in Washington and overseas
- The interagency strategic communications community
- Media, both domestically and in the region

The Center aims to generate a dialogue that begins with the programs and continues after participants leave. NESA produces short, non-attributed executive summaries after seminars and trips. These reports circulated on a limited basis to senior USG stakeholders, contain key/new facts or opinions gleaned from discussions with participants. The purpose of the summary is to help senior policymakers stay informed of views to which they would not otherwise be exposed. These executive summaries routinely generate responses from the 3- and 4-star general/flag officers and their civilian equivalents.

The NESA Center Director is leading the development of an active media outreach program, including travel to the Persian Gulf to meet with media in the region.

== Foundation Programs ==
The NESA Center conducts various seminars on a nearly continuous basis year-round, examples of which are provided below:

- Executive and Senior Executive Seminars
- Executive and Senior Executive Combating Terrorism and Transnational Threats Seminars
- Washington Seminar Series
- Senior National Representatives Seminar
- Embassy Orientation Program
- Strategic Studies Network

== Other Tailored Programs ==
- U.S.-South Asia Leadership Engagement Program (NESA-Harvard)
- U.S., Pakistan, and Afghanistan Programs
- Tunisian National Defense Institute

== Other Regional Centers ==
NESA is one of five regional centers under the Defense Security Cooperation Agency. The other centers include:

- Asia-Pacific Center for Security Studies
- George C. Marshall European Center for Security Studies
- Africa Center for Strategic Studies
- William J. Perry Center for Hemispheric Defense Studies
