= William J. Perry Center for Hemispheric Defense Studies =

U.S. Department of Defense institution for defense and security studies i

- Perry Center Seal

Agency overview
- Formed: 1997
- Headquarters: National Defense University, Fort Lesley J. McNair, Washington, DC
- Motto: Mens et fidis mutua (Mutual understanding and confidence)
- Agency executive: Paul Angelo, Director
- Parent agency: Department of Defense, Defense Security Cooperation Agency
- Website: Perry Center

William J. Perry Center for Hemispheric Defense Studies is a U.S. Department of Defense institution for defense and security studies in the Western Hemisphere. Through courses, seminars, outreach, strategic dialogue, and focused research in support of policy objectives, the Perry Center works with senior civilian and military officials from the Americas to build strong, sustainable networks of security and defense leaders and institutions. In so doing, the Perry Center is supposed to promote greater understanding of U.S. policy, mutually supportive approaches to security challenges, and improved, sustainable institutional capacity."

== History and background ==
The William J. Perry Center for Hemispheric Defense Studies (WJPC) was created on September 3, 1997 by then-U.S. Secretary of Defense William Perry, who had proposed creating a regional center tailored to the unique requirements of the Western Hemisphere where many countries could strengthen civilian defense and security leadership in revitalized democracies. The Perry Center traces its roots back to the first two Defense Ministerial of the Americas (DMA), where Secretary Perry convened defense ministers from around the hemisphere to discuss shared defense and security issues.

In 2013, The Perry Center was the only federal office to receive an Alfred P. Sloan Award for Workplace Flexibility. In 2016, the Perry Center was again honored with the Award for Workplace Flexibility. However, in 2015 the Center for Public Integrity, in an article focusing on alleged gross violations of human rights by senior Center staff, quoted an internal Southern Command document that reported that CHDS "staff had exchanged 'racially charged emails' — including one directed at President Barack Obama; used offensive language such as 'faggot,' 'buttboy' and 'homo'; and that 'women employees feel that they are treated inappropriately.' Even senior leaders used 'inappropriate hand gestures,' it said, and mentioned simulations of masturbation.”

== Controversies ==
The center was the target of several investigations, some professional and some political. In February 2017, Miami Herald published an article on former CHDS Dean Craig Deare, who had been appointed by General Michael Flynn to be the Western Hemisphere chief for the National Security Council. The article alleged that Deare had "a checkered record of support for and involvement with some of the Western Hemisphere’s most notorious human rights abusers." It also mentioned the Senate Armed Services Committee Chair Carl Levin's (D) request for a Department of Defense inspector general's investigation that included questions about what role the U.S. Southern Command's William Perry Center for Hemispheric Defense Studies may have played in the 2009 military coup in Honduras. It added that the probe of CHDS included the question of whether the Center "still bore vestiges of the old School of the Americas, the U.S. program that trained Latin America military officers, many of whom then went on to be brutal dictators in their home countries." A day after its publication in the Herald, Deare offered a controversial analysis of Trump Administration policies and the role of key First Family figures during a supposedly "off-the-record" talk before a score of Beltway "insider" invitees at the Woodrow Wilson Center. Following media coverage of Deare's reported criticism of the Trump policies, allegedly 'awkward' comments about Ivanka Trump's good looks, and the Miami Herald article, Deare was shown the door at the NSC the day after his appearance at the Wilson Center.

On March 10, 2017, Daniel P. Meyer, executive director for Intelligence Community Whistleblowing & Source Protection (ICW&SP), Office of the Inspector General of the Intelligence Community (IC IG), announced that classified Congressional Disclosure #1703 relating to the CHDS scandal had been sent "to both the House Permanent Subcommittee on Intelligence and the Senate Select Committee on Intelligence via a classified network, protecting the lawful disclosure of classified information." Four days later, Department of Defense Inspector General Glenn Fine wrote an email to a senior member of Congress announcing that "Given the seriousness and scope of [the] allegations, OIG staff is conducting a careful analysis of each allegation. While this has taken longer than we would have preferred, we want to ensure that appropriate consideration is given."

In 2015 the Center for Public Integrity, in an article focusing on alleged gross violations of human rights by senior Center staff, quoted an internal Southern Command document that reported that CHDS "staff had exchanged 'racially charged emails' — including one directed at President Barack Obama; used offensive language such as 'faggot,' 'buttboy' and 'homo'; and that 'women employees feel that they are treated inappropriately.' Even senior leaders used 'inappropriate hand gestures,' it said, and mentioned simulations of masturbation.”

Three years earlier, following national security whistleblower disclosures of corruption, alleged human rights violations and other gross malfeasance by other senior staff working under the then Director, Richard Downie, (who earlier was the first Commandant of the controversial Western Hemisphere Institute for Security Cooperation, or WHINSEC), the latter requested an officer from another Regional Center to "informally"—not outside of the chain of command headed by that same Director—investigate the claims. This was done using an Army 15-6 rule in a civilian DoD training institution, choosing someone who belonged to a "sister" institution rather than an independent Office of Inspector General to head the probe. In March, 2012, the investigating officer privately provided his "findings" to the Center Director who had commissioned him: ”After extensive review into these allegation[s], I find that the Center’s leadership has not violated any laws or Department of Defense regulations, has not acted unethically towards its employees, and has maintained good order and conduct expected in an organization of the Department of Defense.” (Downie's deputy at WHINSEC and CHDS was Kenneth LaPlante, a former instructor at the notorious School of the Americas, shut down by Congress in 2000, and an ardent defender of that institution while at what is now called the Perry Center.)

However, four years later, the AR 15-6 military inquiry used by Downie in a civilian DoD center to defend against accusations against him and his colleagues was significantly revised and would not be permitted to be used in such cases as that of CHDS. The "Procedures for Administrative Investigations and Boards of Office" dated April 1, 2016, specifically “prohibits an individual from appointing an inquiry, investigation, or board if that individual is reasonably likely to become a witness; has an actual or perceived bias for or against a potential subject of the investigation, or has an actual conflict of interest in the outcome of the investigation (pars. 2-1F).”

A copy of the report obtained by the Center in a Freedom of Information ((FOIA)) request reflected a state of fear shared by Center staff members reluctant to come forward, as "many employees did want to remain anonymous for fear of retribution" by senior staff. The report specifically cited what the accused wrongdoers had already done to two national security whistleblowers. The Center is now the focus of a DoD Inspector General probe following a request by then Senate Armed Services Chair Carl Levin.

The Center for Hemispheric Defense Studies (CHDS) opened its doors on September 17, 1997, followed by a two-day Hemispheric Conference on Education and Defense. The Center conducted its first resident course, the Defense Planning and Resource Management Course, in March 1998. The Center also conducted the first of many in-region seminars that year.

On April 2, 2013, the Center for Hemispheric Defense Studies was renamed the William J. Perry Center for Hemispheric Defense Studies in honor of the Center's founder, the 19th Secretary of Defense, Dr. William J. Perry.

The Perry Center is co-located at, and maintains an academic relationship with National Defense University at Fort Lesley J. McNair in Washington, DC.

== Courses and programs ==
=== Resident courses ===
Resident courses form the core of the Perry Center academic program. Conducted in Spanish or English, foundational and specialized courses are designed to meet the evolving needs of sophisticated professionals from the defense and security sectors across the hemisphere. Resident phases are one or two weeks in length and are preceded by a distance learning phase.

- Strategy and Defense Policy (SDP)- This foundational course for Spanish-speakers consists of a common core covering topics such as policy analysis and planning, defense planning and resource management, cybersecurity, capability-based planning, organizational reform, and security and defense sector reform. Four thematic areas are explored in depth in small group sessions.
- Washington Security and Defense Seminar (WSDS)- Designed primarily for members of the diplomatic corps of countries from the Western Hemisphere accredited to the White House and to the Organization of American States. Participants are exposed to issues and share perspectives on the formation and implementation of U.S. national security and foreign policy, and the dynamics of government decision-making.
- Managing Security and Defense (MSD)- Conceived to build the capacity of senior executives in the security and defense sectors to enable them to better manage their respective sectors through effective policies and integrated decisions. The MSD supports the broader framework of Security and Defense Institution Building (SDIB).
- Caribbean Defense and Security Course (CDSC)- Designed to help participants develop and expand their competence in analyzing issues and challenges in the Caribbean region and then utilize tools of policy, strategy, planning, and resource management to effect reforms in the security and defense sectors.
- Combating Transnational Organized Crime and Illicit Networks in the Americas (CTOC) - The principal objective of this course is to deepen participants' understanding and analysis of transnational criminal organizations (TCOs) and the defense and security threats they pose to the Americas through their illicit activities, which include drug trafficking, money laundering, arms trafficking, human smuggling, counterfeiting, and cyber crimes.
- Defense Policy and Complex Threats (DPCT)- Formulated for security and defense practitioners, the DPCT course presents methodologies and tools that can forecast future security and defense challenges and identify institutional gaps in confronting complex adaptive conflicts. Informed by realistic, data-driven models, policymakers can develop strategic policy guidance that establishes long-term priorities and optimizes resources and forces to better respond to the security needs of both tomorrow and today.
- Strategic Implications of Human Rights and Rule of Law (HR/ROL)- The objectives of this course include deepening the participants’ understanding and analysis of complex topics of human rights, the rule of law, international humanitarian law, military professionalism, and transitional justice.

=== Regional seminars ===
Regional seminars are held in conjunction with regional partners and are tailored to the specific objectives identified by the Perry Center, the partner institution, and the U.S. embassy team. Regional seminars serve to enhance sustainable institutional capacity, emphasizing support to national and regional policy-makers and leaders.

- Regional Seminar to Combat Transnational Organized Crime and Illicit Networks (CTOC) - Similar to the CTOC resident course, the objective of this seminar is to build capacity and develop a Community of Practice to understand the threats from transnational organized crime, terrorism, and illicit networks and to develop national, regional, and international strategies to promote security and prosperity in combating these threats in Latin America.

=== Hemispheric Forums ===
The Hemispheric Forum is a vehicle that takes advantage of the abundance of subject-matter experts and the community of interest in Western Hemisphere affairs. The format of each program is a panel discussion centered on a timely and important topic, with expert panelists representing government, think tanks, and academia. These events are open to the public and are streamed online with simultaneous Spanish interpretation.

Hemispheric Forum topics have included:

- Women in Peace and Security
- Dynamics of FARC Demobilization
- Coping with Opposition to the U.S. in Parts of Latin America
- Corruption in the Western Hemisphere: Impediment to Citizen Security and Democratic Consolidation
- Impact of Energy Developments in the Greater Caribbean Region
- Reducing Violence in Central America: Citizen Security and the El Salvador Experiment
- Security and Defense Challenges Posed by Emerging Technologies in the Americas: Cybersecurity, Drones (Unmanned Systems), and Robotics
- The Colombia Peace Process
- The Changing Western Hemisphere
- Beyond Convergence: A World Without Order

== Alumni ==
Key to the Perry Center's mission is relationship-building, as it strives to maintain strong relationships with alumni. Maintaining relationships with alumni helps the Center's professors stay abreast of security and defense developments in countries throughout the region, and also provides opportunities for collaboration and increased regional exposure for the Perry Center. All of the following countries have sent participants to resident events at the Center: Antigua and Barbuda, Argentina, Belize, Bahamas, Barbados, Bolivia, Brazil, Canada, Chile, Colombia, Costa Rica, Dominican Republic, Dominica, Ecuador, El Salvador, Equatorial Guinea, Great Britain, Grenada, Guatemala, Guyana, Haiti, Honduras, Jamaica, Mexico, Morocco, Nicaragua, Nigeria, Panama, Paraguay, Pakistan, Peru, Portugal, Romania, Saint Christopher and Nevis, Spain, St. Vincent and the Grenadines, St. Lucia, Trinidad and Tobago, the United States Uruguay, and Venezuela.

Notable alumni

- Dr. José Bayardi, former Minister of Employment and Public Security, former Uruguay Minister of Defense
- His Excellency Brigadier (ret.) David A. Granger, President of Guyana
- His Excellency Stephen Charles Vasciannie, former Ambassador of Jamaica to the United States
- The Most Excellent Victoria Villarruel, Vice-president of Argentina

== William J. Perry Award ==
The William J. Perry Award for Excellence in Security and Defense Education is named after the former U.S. Secretary of Defense who was responsible for the establishment of the William J. Perry Center for Hemispheric Defense Studies. Recipients are chosen for having substantially contributed in tangible ways to enhancing capacity in security and defense, building mutually beneficial relationships, and increasing democratic security in the Americas. Nominees may be educators, practitioners, or institutions of defense and security from throughout the Hemisphere, or from outside the region.

Year	Individual category	Institutional category
2015	Admiral Vidal Francisco Soberón Sanz, Secretary of the Mexican Navy; Professor Ivelaw Lloyd Griffith, Ph.D.	N/A
2014	Dr. Richard Millett, Professor Emeritus of History, Southern Illinois University at Edwardsville	The Inter-American Defense College (IADC); The Center of Advanced Studies of National Defense of Spain (CESEDEN)
2013	Dr. Maria Liz Garcia de Arnold, Minister of Defense of Paraguay	The National War College of Colombia (ESDEGUE)
2012	Felipe Calderón, President of Mexico; Peter MacKay, Minister of National Defence of Canada	The Regional Security System (RSS); The Western Hemisphere Institute for Security Cooperation (WHINSEC)
2011	Nelson Jobim, former Minister of Defense of Brazil	The U.S. National Guard Bureau's State Partnership Program
2010	Dr. José Arturo Bayardi Lozano, former Minister of Defense of Uruguay; GEN John Galvin, USA (ret.), former Supreme Allied Commander, NATO	The Center for Superior Naval Studies of Mexico (CESNAV)
2009	N/A	The Strategic Superior Studies College of El Salvador (CAEE)
2008	N/A	The National Academy for Political and Strategic Studies of Chile (ANEPE)
2007	N/A	The Strategic Leadership for Defense and Crisis Management Course (CEDEYAC) of Peru

== Other DSCA regional centers ==
The Perry Center is one of five regionally-focused security studies organizations. The Defense Security Cooperation Agency is the Executive Agent for all five organizations. The other four are:

- Africa Center for Strategic Studies (ACSS)
- Daniel K. Inouye Asia-Pacific Center for Security Studies (DKI-APCSS)
- George C. Marshall Center for European Security Studies (GCMC)
- Near East South Asia Center for Strategic Studies (NESA)

== See also ==
- National Defense University
- William J. Perry
- Defense Diplomacy
