= George C. Marshall European Center for Security Studies =

American defense studies institute

George C. Marshall Center for European Security Studies
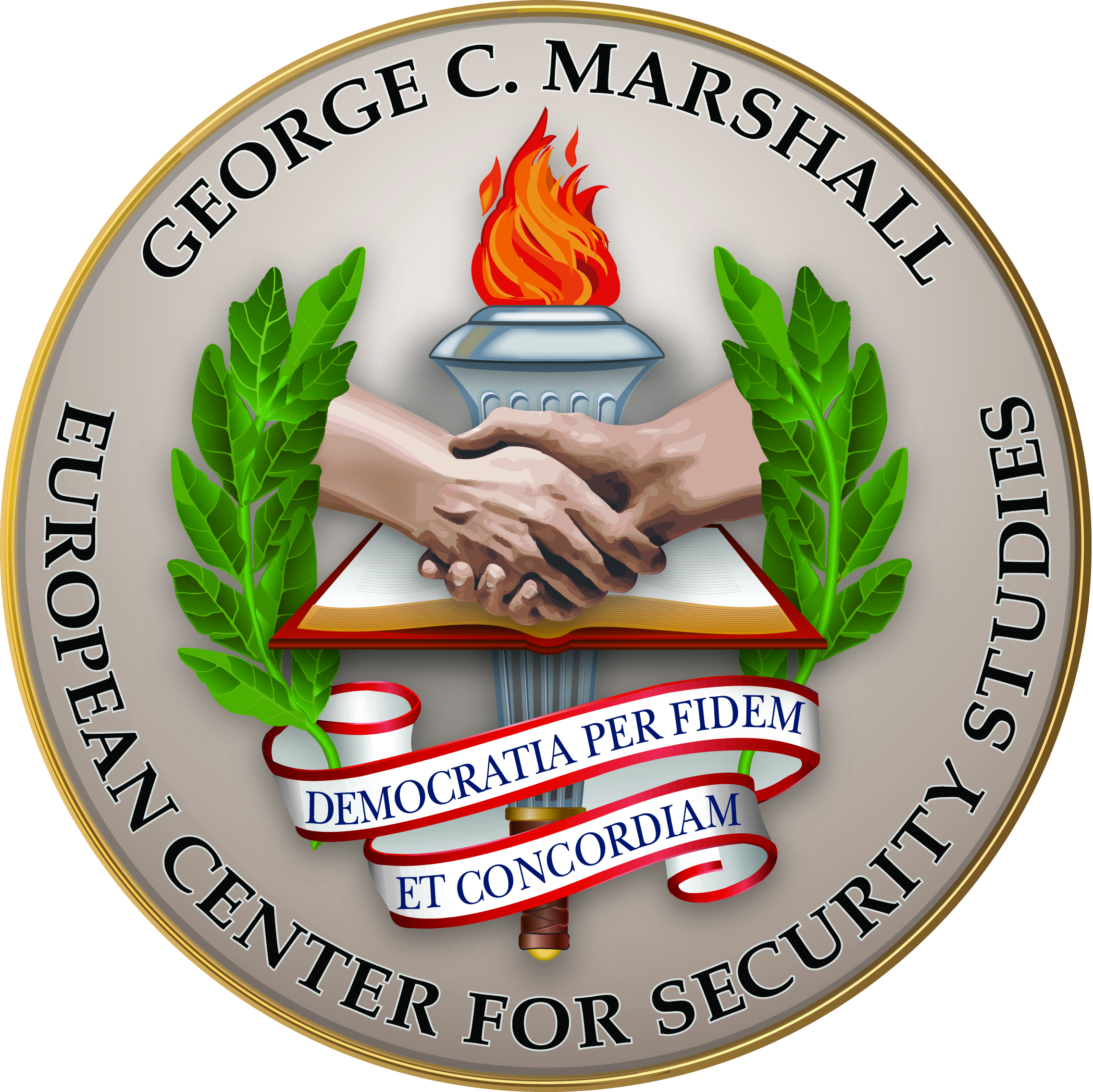
- Marshall Center Seal

Agency overview
- Formed: 1993
- Jurisdiction: Government of Germany, United States Government
- Headquarters: Gernackerstrasse 2, 82467 Garmisch-Partenkirchen
- Motto: Democratia per fidem et concordiam (Democracy through trust and friendship)
- Parent agency: Department of Defense, Defense Security Cooperation Agency, German Defense Ministry
- Website: Marshall Center

The George C. Marshall European Center for Security Studies is a bi-national United States Department of Defense and Federal Ministry of Defence (Germany) security and defense studies institute. When the Marshall Center was founded in 1993, its mission was to create a more stable security environment by advancing democratic institutions and relationships, especially in the field of defense; promoting active, peaceful, security cooperation; and enhancing enduring partnerships among the nations of North America, Europe, and Eurasia. As of Oct. 1, 2014, the Marshall Center's regional mission changed to a transnational one based on an Office of the Secretary of Defense directive to change from a European to a global participants' base.

The current mission of the Marshall Center is to enable solutions to regional and transnational security challenges through capacity building, access, and a globally connected network. The Marshall Center conducts a variety of unique programs involving to date more than 14,000 officials from more than 157 countries.

Most programs are taught in English.

The Marshall Center is named after American statesman and soldier Gen. George Catlett Marshall, Jr. After World War II and in his service as Secretary of State, Marshall advocated a significant U.S. economic and political commitment to post-war European recovery, often referred to as the Marshall Plan – a plan that saved millions of Europeans from starvation and Soviet domination.

The Marshall Center is co-located with the Armed Forces Recreation Center's Edelweiss Lodge and Resort, a U.S. Department of Defense owned hotel in Garmisch-Partenkirchen, Germany. Located in the Bavarian Alps near the Austrian border, the Edelweiss opened in September 2004. Both the Marshall Center and the Edelweiss are supported by the U.S. Army Garrison Bavaria-Military Community Garmisch, which falls under Army Installation Management Command-Europe.

== Background ==
After the failed August 1991 coup attempt in Russia, defense specialists identified the need for an institution such as the Marshall Center. The United States European Command (EUCOM) began to develop proposals to expand defense and security contacts with the emerging democracies of Central and Eastern Europe and Eurasia in order to positively influence the development of security structures appropriate for democratic states. In February 1992, a proposal was submitted to then-Chairman of the Joint Chiefs of Staff General Colin Powell to use the facilities of the former U.S. Army Russia Institute (USARI) to create a European center for security studies in order to rapidly develop opportunities to work with European and Eurasian defense establishments. He endorsed the plan on March 17, 1992. Undersecretary of Defense for Policy Paul Wolfowitz approved the proposal that summer, and the staffs began developing a charter for the proposed center.

Former Secretary of Defense Dick Cheney signed DOD Directive 5200.34 in November 1992, establishing the George C. Marshall European Center for Security Studies as an element of EUCOM under the authority, direction and control of the EUCOM commander. Then EUCOM Commander Gen. John M. Shalikashvili hosted the June 5, 1993, ceremony officially dedicating the Marshall Center in Garmisch-Partenkirchen, Germany. The center was given the charter of stabilizing and thereby strengthening post-Cold War Europe. Secretary of Defense Les Aspin and German Minister of Defense Volker Rühe were the keynote speakers. The date of the Marshall Center's Inauguration Day Ceremony on June 5 was specifically chosen to commemorate the date of the historic speech by then Secretary of State George C. Marshall, who proposed a radical plan to assist postwar Europe in a Harvard University address June 5, 1947. This plan, the Economic Recovery Program or Marshall Plan, would be signed into law less than one year later and would shape the success of postwar Europe.

The Marshall Center became a German-American partnership when a memorandum of agreement was signed on December 2, 1994, between headquarters EUCOM and the German Ministry of Defense. An updated MoA with Germany that increased German contributions to the Marshall Center was signed in October 2016.

The Marshall Center is one of five DOD regional centers of the Defense Security Cooperation Agency.

The facilities of the Marshall Center encompass the Sheridan Kaserne and Artillery, formerly the Krafft von Dellmensingen Kaserne. Sheridan Kaserne, originally named Jaeger Kaserne, was built in 1937 to house German military (Wehrmacht) troops. The U.S. Army first used the installation in 1945 as a prisoner-of-war camp for officers. The headquarters of the First Mountain Division of the new German Army was located on the Kasernes from 1960 to 1992. The installation became home to the Garmisch U.S. military community, the headquarters of the Armed Forces Recreation Center and the former U.S. Army Russia Institute (USARI) in May 1964. In June 1992, the USARI facilities transferred to the newly formed George C. Marshall European Center for Security Studies.

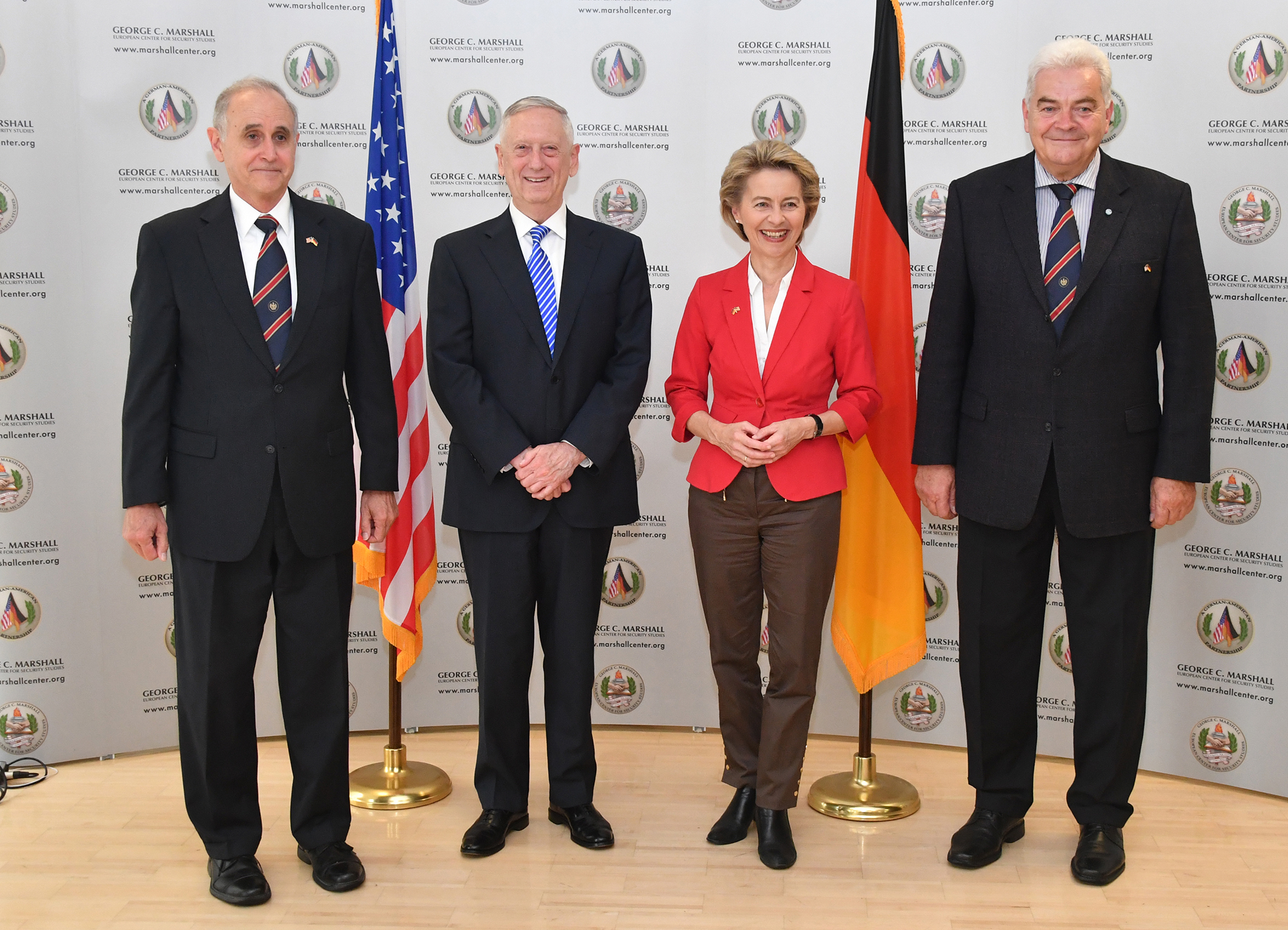
The former U.S. Secretary of Defense Jim Mattis and former German Minister of Defense Ursula von der Leyen during a ceremony honoring 70 years of the Marshall Plan June 28, 2017. (DOD Photo by Karl-Heinz Wedhorn)

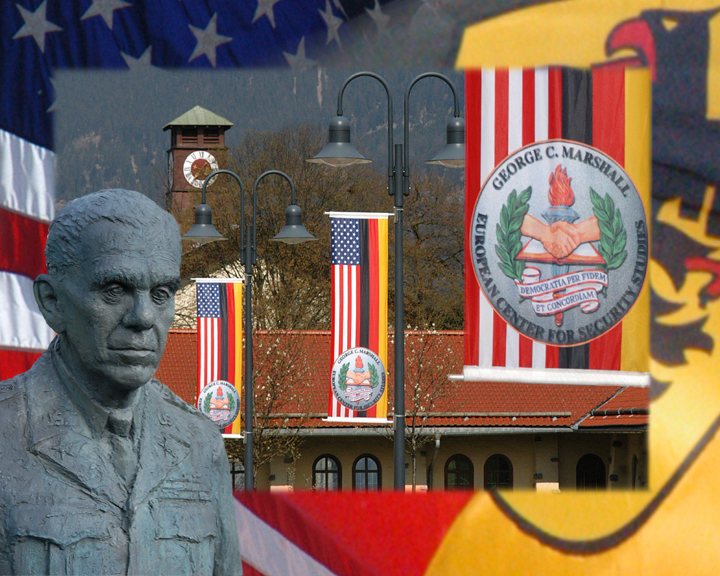
The Marshall Center is named after American statesman and soldier George Catlett Marshall, Jr. (DOD Graphic)

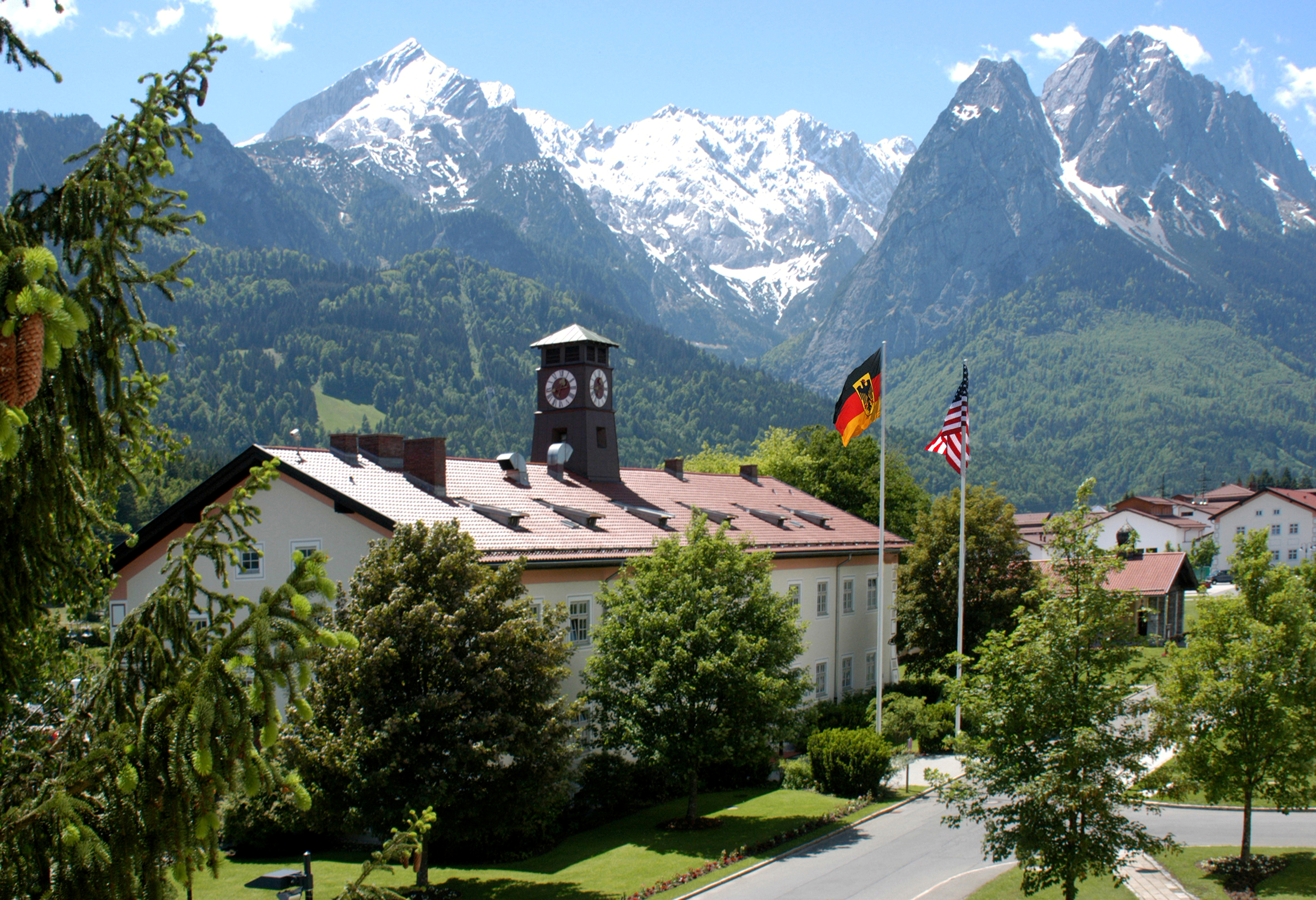
A view of the Marshall Center's Woerner Hall, Bldg. 109. (DOD photo by Karl-Heinz Wedhorn)

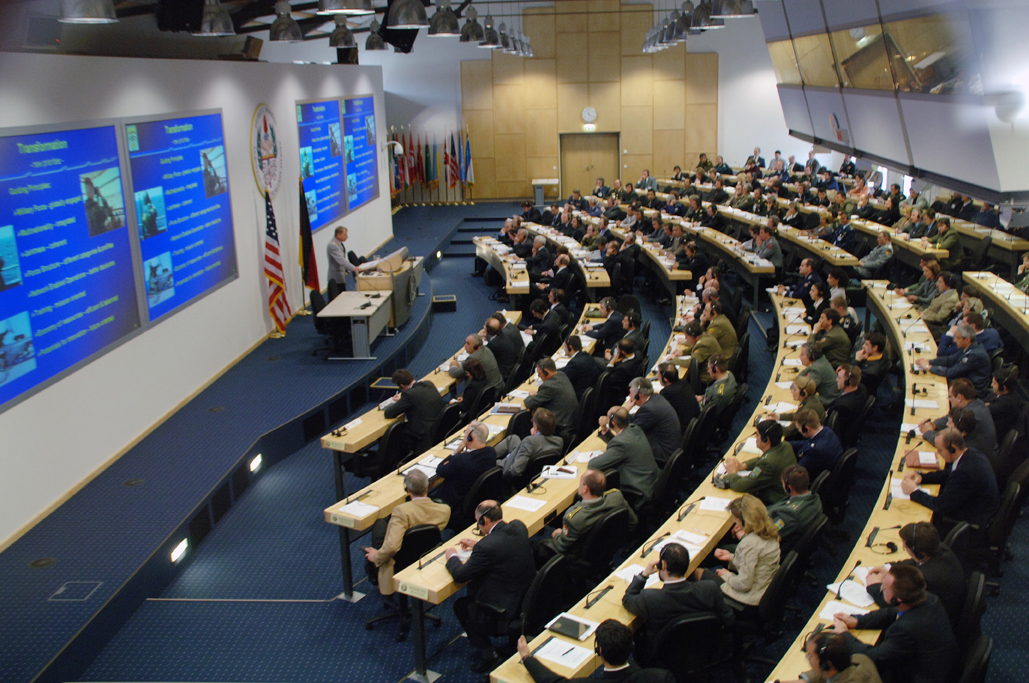
Marshall Center's methodology centers on daily plenary lectures—presentations by subject matter experts from an array of backgrounds. (DOD photo by Karl-Heinz Wedhorn)

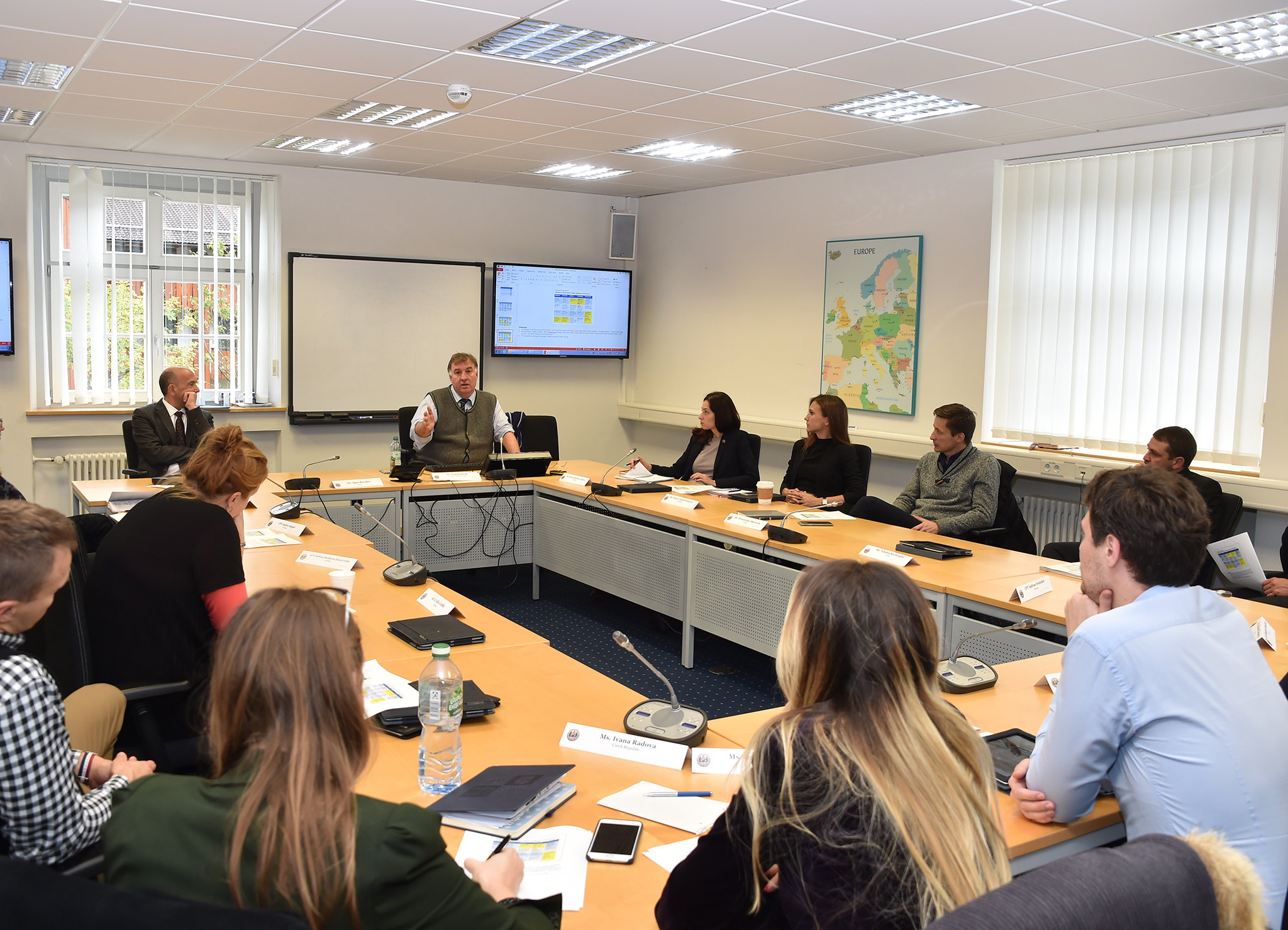
The Marshall Center offers the opportunity to discuss topics presented by subject matter experts in greater depth in small seminar groups. (DOD photo by Karl-Heinz Wedhorn)

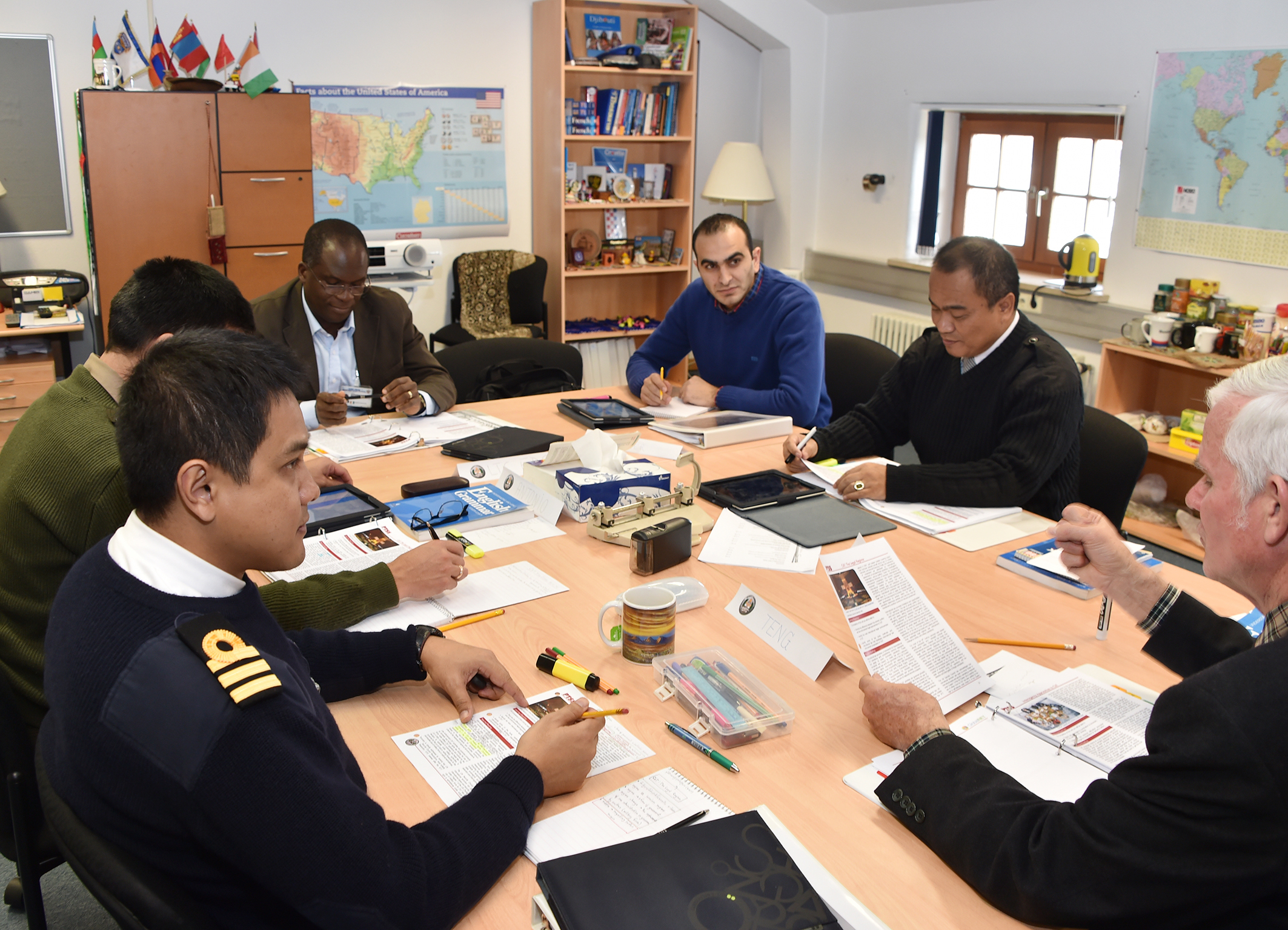
The Marshall Center's Partner Language Training Center Europe (PLTCE) offers a five-week English Language Enhancement Course in conjunction with PASS, CTOC, PCSS and PTSS. (DOD photo by Karl-Heinz Wedhorn)

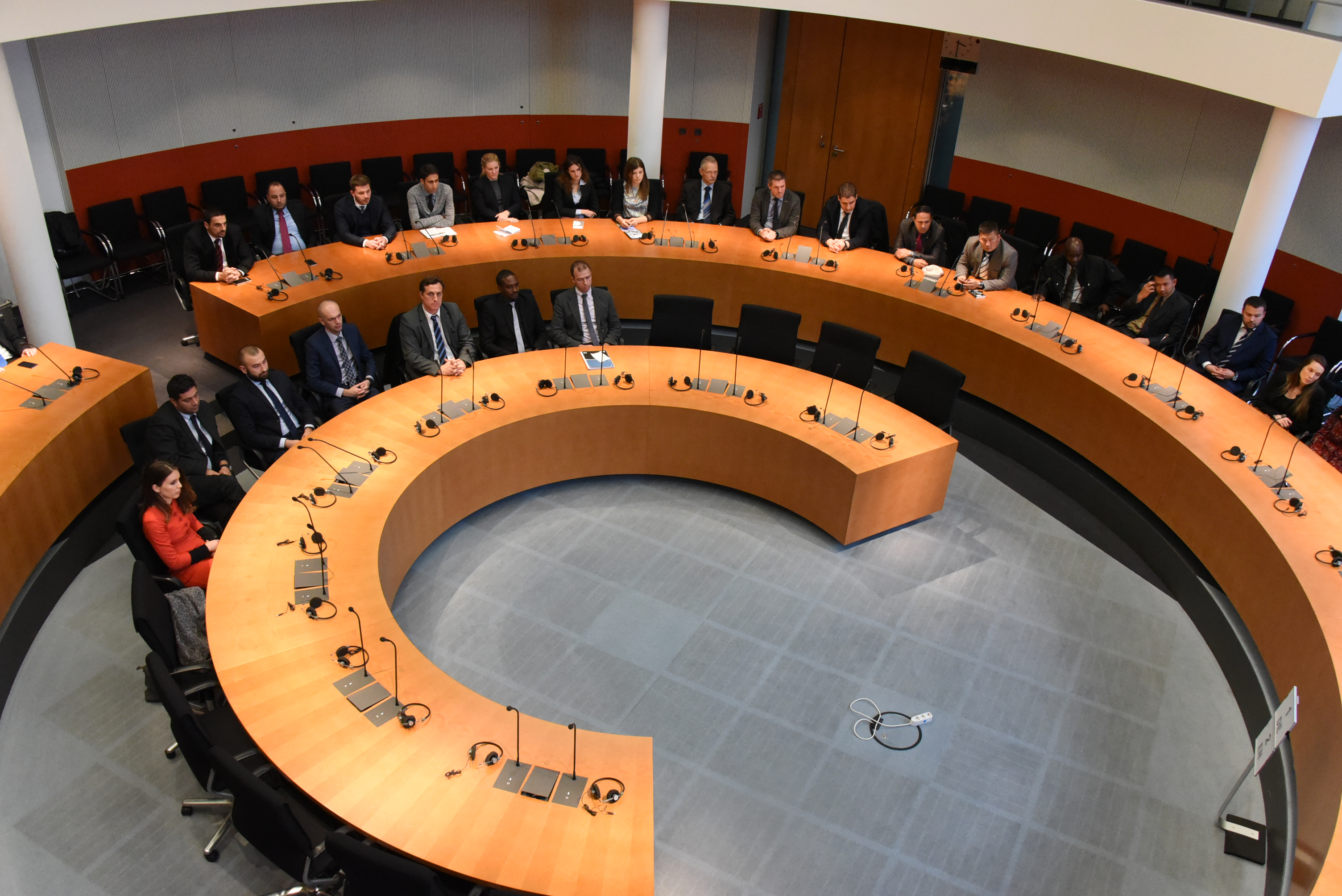
Program on Applied Security Studies participants visit Federal Ministry of Interior for presentations on challenges in fighting the international terror and developments in migration policy Nov. 8, 2017, as part of the Berlin Field Study Trip. (DOD Photo by SMSGT Mark Winkler)

It's a tradition for participants of the Program on Applied Security Studies to prepare food from their native land to share their culture with the Marshall Center staff and Faculty. (DOD photo by Karl-Heinz Wedhorn)

== College of International and Security Studies ==
The Marshall Center's College of International and Security Studies offers 12 resident courses, and outreach and alumni events that examine transnational, regional and international security issues. Due to the COVID Pandemic, the Marshall Center also now offers virtual events. The Marshall Center Website lists resident, outreach and alumni events.

In cooperation with the University of the Bundeswehr Munich, the Marshall Center also has a Master of Arts in International Security Studies (MISS).[24] Visit the public website at marshallcenter.org for information and eligibility requirements. The CISS faculty are civilian academics, policy practitioners, and active duty U.S., German, and allied military. As of February 2021, CISS resident programs are listed below. For an updated listing and course description, visit the public website at marshallcenter.org.

- Program on Countering Transnational Organized Crime (CTOC)
- Program on Countering Transnational Organized Crime International Forum (CTOC-IF)
- European African Security Seminar (EASS)
- European Security Seminar-East (ESS-E)
- European Security Seminar-EU-NATO Cooperation (ESS-EU/NATO)
- European Security Seminar-North (ESS-N)
- German-American Regional Security Seminar (GARSS)
- Program on Applied Security Studies Main Modules Course (PASS MMC)
- Program on Cyber Security Studies (PCSS)
- Program on Terrorism and Security Studies (PTSS)
- Senior Executive Seminar (SES)
- Seminar on Regional Security (SRS)

The Marshall Center's Alumni Office works to support and expand its network of more than 14,000 alumni from 157 nations through dialogue and information exchange, continuing professional development opportunities, and collaboration with graduates who seek to uphold its ideals and vision. NOTE: This alumni count is updated as of February 2021. This network is supported through a program including in-country events, web-based professional involvement and opportunities for selected graduates.

Graduates have access to many resources via the Marshall Center's alumni portal "GlobalNET." This password-protected website includes access to many commercial databases of periodical and scholarly journal articles. The alumni portal also makes graduate essays and papers available, hosts discussion forums about the key security challenges of the day, and links to other materials of topical interest to alumni. The portal also provides a searchable directory of alumni maintained by the Graduate Support Program as a networking tool for security professionals. In addition, the GlobalNET portal hosts all the Marshall Center resident course programs and content.

Special opportunities for selected graduates include the opportunity for practitioners or experts in specific security fields to return to Garmisch as part of a one-week Community of Interest event, to focus and collaborate with other graduates in their specific areas of expertise. Additionally, graduates with exceptional scholarly and writing skills can return for up to five weeks as a Marshall Center Scholar to conduct research under the sponsorship of Marshall Center faculty.

The Marshall Center Research Library advances and supports the learning, teaching, and research goals of participants, faculty and alumni. The library's collection primarily focuses on global security, terrorism, cyberterrorism, international relations and strategic communication, as well as peace and stabilization operations, including crisis and conflict management. The library houses more than 65,000 volumes of books and multimedia in English, German and Russian, and subscribes to more than 150 journals. They also offer access to a much larger collection by way of e-books, e-journals, online databases and other electronic resources that can be accessed from anywhere on-campus, or via the GlobalNET portal when off-campus. Other services include Research Guides and research skills instruction in classes and workshops, as well as individualized help.

== Research & policy analysis ==
The Marshall Center conducts collaborative teaching, dialogue, and research into democratic security building, with a focus on identifying and analyzing challenges in order to discuss and promote security policy responses that uphold the national interests and values of friends and allies, while mitigating risk and escalation.

Research at the Marshall Center involves collaborative efforts by Faculty, Fellows and Alumni, leading to multi-partner research projects that result in publications. The following is a list of publications, current as of February 2021.

- Russia Strategic Initiative
- Marshall Center Occasional Papers
- Marshall Center Security Insights
- Marshall Center Perspectives
- per Concordiam
- Marshall Center Papers
- Marshall Center Book Projects

== Other programs ==
Also located at the Marshall Center are the Eurasian Foreign Area Officer Program (FAO), Fellows/Joint Professional Military Education (JPME)and the Partner Language Training Center Europe (PLTCE.)

The FAO Program prepares U.S. military officers and officers of allied nations to be leading regional experts and to serve in key political-military assignments throughout Eurasia. While each FAO executes a unique, tailored, individual training program, most FAOs can expect to spend 12–18 months living, working, and traveling in Eurasia, as well as participating in Marshall Center activities. After completing the program, FAOs will go on to serve in U.S. embassies in the region, on NATO and major U.S. theater command staffs, and on numerous operational missions throughout the world.

The U.S. Senior Fellows Program provides a regionally focused, professional education experience at the senior service school level for U.S. Army, Navy, and Air Force officers of the rank of Major to Colonel. Fellows are selected by their respective services for the 11-month program, during which they participate in a variety of Marshall Center resident courses and conferences and, if suitably qualified and experienced, have the opportunity to teach as co-seminar leaders for resident programs.

The Partner Language Training Center Europe offers advanced and specialized classroom instruction in Arabic, English, French, Persian, and Russian to more than 400 U.S. military and NATO/Partner attendees each year. PLTCE is a NATO Partner Training and Education Centre. English classes are also offered to the international participants enrolled in the College of International and Security Studies' resident programs.

Additionally, the operations staff of the Partnership for Peace Consortium of Defense Academies and Security Studies Institutes is located at the Marshall Center. This international organization is dedicated to strengthening defense and military education and research through enhanced institutional and national cooperation.

== Notable alumni ==
As part of its continuing engagement with alumni, the Marshall Center offers support for alumni-led activities, such as outreach networking events in capital cities across the region, which provide an opportunity for alumni to discuss important security issues in an inter-ministerial forum. As of February 2021, 241 graduates of Marshall Center resident programs are serving in the following positions: Minister - 17; Deputy Minister - 18; Chief of Defense - 10; Ambassador - 151; Member of Parliament - 45.

== DSCA regional centers ==
The Marshall Center is one of six regionally-focused security studies organizations, all of which are managed by the Defense Security Cooperation Agency. The other five are:

The Africa Center for Strategic Studies (ACSS) supports the development of U.S. strategic policy towards Africa by providing a variety of programs, fostering awareness of and dialogue on U.S. strategic priorities and African security issues, building trusting long-term relationships with African military and civilian leaders, assisting U.S. policy-makers in formulating effective African policy, and articulating African perspectives to U.S. policymakers

The Daniel K. Inouye Asia-Pacific Center for Security Studies (APCSS) officially opened September 4, 1995, in Honolulu, Hawaii. The APCSS is a regional study, conference and research center with a non-warfighting mission to enhance Asia-Pacific security cooperation through programs of executive education, professional exchange and policy relevant research. The Center provides a focal point where national officials, decision makers and policy makers can gather to exchange ideas, explore pressing issues and achieve a greater understanding of the challenges that shape the security environment of the Asia-Pacific region.

The William J. Perry Center for Hemispheric Defense Studies (WJPC) is a U.S. Department of Defense institution for defense and security studies in the Western Hemisphere. Through courses, seminars, outreach, strategic dialogue, and focused research in support of policy objectives, the Perry Center works with senior civilian and military officials from the Americas to build strong, sustainable networks of security and defense leaders and institutions. In so doing, the Perry Center promotes greater understanding of U.S. policy, mutually supportive approaches to security challenges, and improved, sustainable institutional capacity.

The mission of the Near East South Asia Center for Strategic Studies (NESA) is to enhance stability in the Near East and in South Asia by providing an academic environment where strategic issues can be addressed, understanding deepened, partnerships fostered, defense-related decision-making improved, and cooperation strengthened among military and civilian leaders from the region and the United States.

The Ted Stevens Center for Arctic Security Studies (TSC) is the newest regional center and focuses on arctic security issues.

== See also ==
- German Marshall Fund
- George C. Marshall High School
- Marshall Scholarship
- Marshall Mission to China
- Marshall Space Flight Center
- The George C. Marshall Foundation
- USS George C. Marshall (SSBN-654)
- Defense Diplomacy
