= International reactions to the Tunisian revolution =

The international reactions to the Tunisian revolution were generally supportive of the Tunisian people's right to protest, though several governments continued to voice support for President Zine El Abidine Ben Ali up to and even after his government's largely peaceful overthrow in January 2011.

== Supranational organisations ==
- Arab League — Secretary-General Amr Moussa warned at a summit in Egypt that "the Arab soul is broken by poverty, unemployment and general recession. This is in the mind of all of us. The Tunisian revolution is not far from us. The Arab citizen entered an unprecedented state of anger and frustration." He then called for an Arab "renaissance" to alleviate the burden that has caused the Arab frustration.
- European Union — Foreign Policy Chief Catherine Ashton and Commissioner Stefan Fuele jointly expressed their "support and recognition to the Tunisian people and their democratic aspirations, which should be achieved in a peaceful way" urging "all parties to show restraint and remain calm in order to avoid further casualties and violence". The EU also expressed its "willingness to help find lasting democratic solutions to the ongoing crisis". She expressed support for the interim government saying "The European Union is committed to supporting Tunisia economically and to supporting civil society in order to have free elections."
- United Nations — Secretary-General Ban Ki-moon stated that "the political situation is developing fast and every effort must be made by all concerned parties to establish dialogue and resolve problems peacefully to prevent further loss, violence and escalations"

== Countries ==
- China — while party officials have kept quiet, Chinese government has forbidden to use the word "Jasmine" in its social medias, the China International Jasmine Cultural Festival was cancelled that year, selling of jasmine flowers was forbidden and as a result the province Daqing which exported it suffered big income decline, a video with the song about the flower (Mo Li Hua in Chinese )of former Chinese president Hu Jintao was banned.
- France — President Nicolas Sarkozy stated that "only dialogue can bring a democratic and lasting solution to the current crisis" French Socialist Party First Secretary, Martine Aubry, called on the French government to be tougher towards the Tunisian government. "I would like to say to the Tunisian people that it has the full support and solidarity of the PS, and we ask that France adopt a strong position condemning the unacceptable repression." Foreign Minister Michèle Alliot-Marie offered to send paratroopers to help quell the protests against Ben Ali just days before she left office. The Financial Times columnist Roula Khalaf reported that "Having offered Zein al-Abidine Ben Ali, the man it regarded as a bulwark against Islamism, French savoir faire for his security forces three days before he fled, Paris then performed a diplomatic about-turn by denying the fleeing president entry into France." On 24 January, Paris's state prosecutor office announced that it had opened an investigation into French assets held by Ben Ali. Alliot-Marie faced criticism and calls for her resignation in February after news broke that she flew in a private jet owned by a Tunisian businessman during the uprising. President Nicolas Sarkozy responded by telling his ministers to take their holidays in France more often saying "What was commonplace a few years back can prove shocking nowadays." On 27 February, the French foreign minister's office announced her resignation, saying that an open letter had been sent to Nicolas Sarkozy, the French president, in which Alliot-Marie made clear she felt she had not done anything wrong.
  - According to The Economist: "French police hint that more than €70m ($93m) in gold was moved to Dubai and Istanbul via French airports by Mr Ben Ali's staff during Tunisia's revolution. (French customs officials apparently reported the transfers to superiors but no action was taken.)".
- Iran — Speaker of Parliament Ali Larijani praised the protests by the Tunisian people "to restore their rights." He accused Western states of being "countries which are the main cause of autocracy (in Tunisia)...[but] are pretending that they are sympathising with the nation."
- Lebanon — Hezbollah Secretary-General Hassan Nasrallah expressed solidarity with the protesters on the grounds that "protests will push out regime that has maintained peace with Israel."
- Libya — On 16 January, leader Muammar Gaddafi decried Ben Ali's removal in a speech on Libyan state television: "You have suffered a great loss. There is none better than Zine to govern Tunisia. Tunisia, a developed country that is a tourist destination, is becoming prey to hooded gangs, to thefts and fire. [The conditions in Tunisia reflect] chaos with no end in sight. I am concerned for the people of Tunisia, whose sons are dying each day. And for what? In order for someone to become president instead of Ben Ali? I do not know these new people, but we all knew Ben Ali and the transformation that was achieved in Tunisia. Why are you destroying all of that? [Do not be fooled by] WikiLeaks which publishes information written by lying ambassadors in order to create chaos."
- Morocco — The Foreign Ministry issued a statement expressing "solidarity" with the Tunisian people, hoping that Tunisia will attain "civil peace."
- Philippines — The Department of Foreign Affairs released a statement saying that the Philippines "is closely monitoring the developments in Tunisia after the formation of a transitional government", supporting the will of the Tunisian people and urging a return to calm in preparation for "free, fair and transparent" elections.
- Sahrawi Arab Democratic Republic — The government announced its support for "the free choice of brotherly Tunisian people," through a statement its Foreign Affairs Minister Mohamed Salem Ould Salek: "The Government of the Sahrawi Arab Democratic Republic followed with great interest the current developments in Tunisia...The Sahrawi government hopes peace, security and stability to brotherly Tunisia in freedom, democracy and equality.".
- Switzerland — The government said that it had frozen Ben Ali's bank accounts in the country.
- United Kingdom — Foreign Secretary William Hague condemned the violence and called for "a rapid return to law and order, restraint from all sides, an orderly move towards free and fair elections and an immediate expansion of political freedoms in Tunisia", urging the Tunisian authorities "to do all they can to resolve the situation peacefully" An emergency flight was also chartered to bring back British citizens from Tunisia.
- United States — President Barack Obama applauded the courage and dignity of protesting Tunisians. He urged all parties to keep calm and avoid violence. He also called on the Tunisian government to respect human rights and hold free and fair elections in the future. During the 2011 State of the Union Address, he referenced events in Tunisia saying that the democratic goals are supported and that the "struggles" of the American people are sought by others around the world. The State Departments leading envoy for the region, Jeffrey Feltman, said the US was hoping that the "example" of Tunisia would bring reform to the rest of the region. "I certainly expect that we'll be using the Tunisian example [in talks with other Arab governments]. The challenges being faced in many parts of the world, particularly in the Arab world, are the same and we hope people will be addressing legitimate political, social, economic grievances." This came despite US support for Ben Ali. He also said he would visit France for talks over the crisis in Tunisia.
  - Senators John McCain and Joe Lieberman visited Tunisia on 21 February to express support for the caretaker government.

== NGOs ==
The International Federation for Human Rights, which is headed by Tunisian journalist Souhayr Belhassen, condemned "the use of firearms by the Tunisian security forces, and calls for an independent inquiry to cast light on these events, to hold those responsible accountable and to guarantee the right to peaceful protest."

== Activist and militant groups ==
The Al-Qaeda Organization in the Islamic Maghreb voiced support for the demonstrators against both the Tunisian and Algerian governments in a video released on 13 January 2011. AQIM leader Abu Musab Abdul Wadud offered military aid and training to the demonstrators. He also called on them to overthrow "the corrupt, criminal and tyrannical" regime and for "retaliation" against the Tunisian government. His statement was denounced by Tunisian members of parliament, journalists, students, and residents.

The Muslim Brotherhood in Egypt commented on the events in Tunisia in relation to that of Egypt: "Muslim Brotherhood has asserted that the group believes immediate reform is necessary if Egypt is not to follow suit in Tunisia's historical uprising witnessed worldwide."

On 2 January the hacktivist group Anonymous announced 'Operation Tunisia' in solidarity with the protests by targeting a number of Tunisian state-run websites with Distributed Denial of Service (DDoS) attacks. In a statement Anonymous announced:

The Tunisian government wants to control the present with falsehoods and misinformation in order to impose the future by keeping the truth hidden from its citizens. We will not remain silent while this happens. Anonymous has heard the claim for freedom of the Tunisian people. Anonymous is willing to help the Tunisian people in this fight against oppression.

Within 24 hours of the announcement, multiple Tunisian governmental websites were made unavailable, including: Bourse de Tunis (the Tunisian national stock exchange), Foreign Ministry, Ministry of Industry, Tunisian Government Commerce, The Carthage Palace (home to the President), presidential election commission and a government website that is a portal for various ministries.

== See also ==
- International reactions to the Arab Spring
