= Defense Security Cooperation Agency =

US military agency

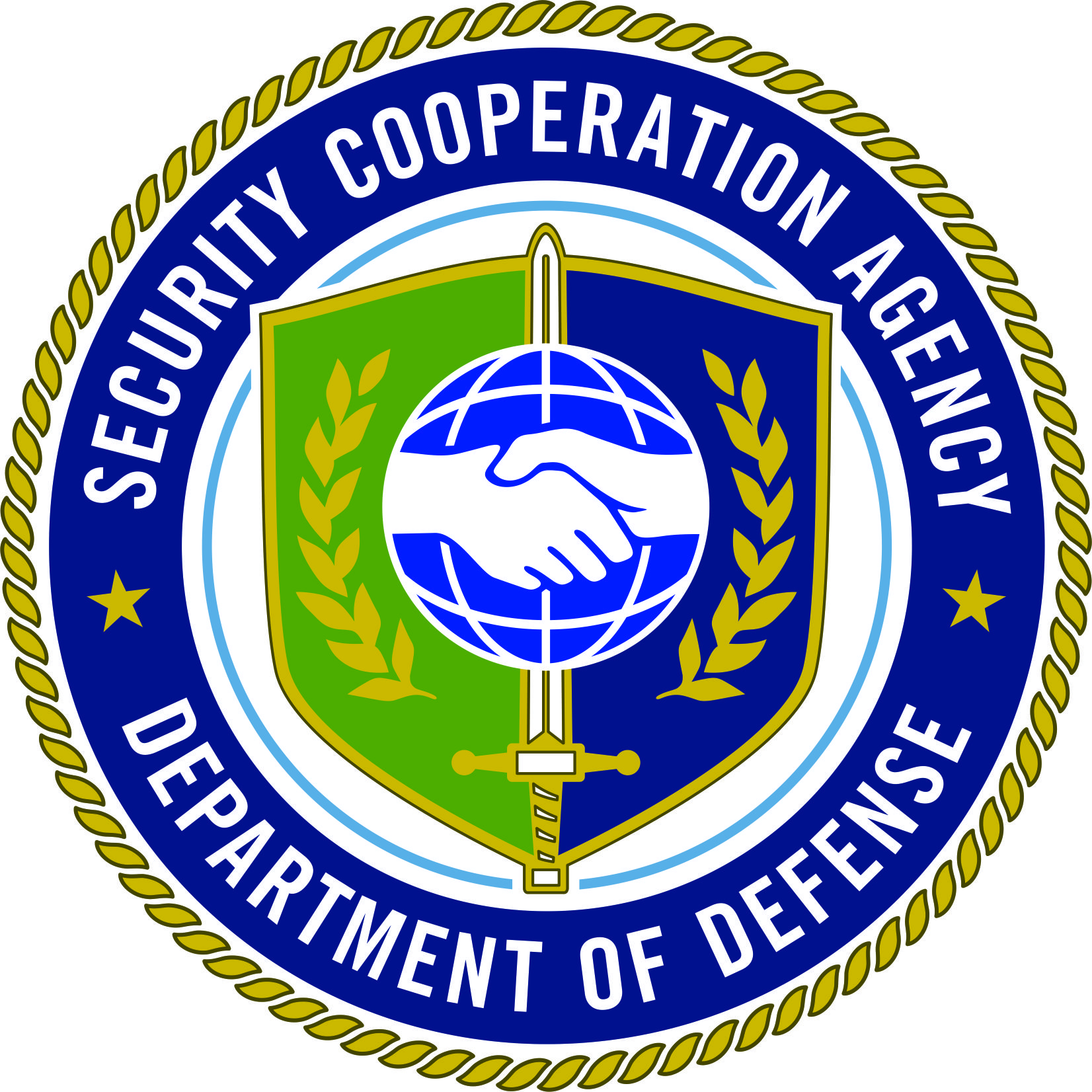

Agency overview
- Jurisdiction: U.S. federal government
- Headquarters: The Pentagon, Arlington County, Virginia, U.S.
- Agency executive: Michael F. Miller, Director
- Website: www.dsca.mil

The Defense Security Cooperation Agency (DSCA) is an agency within the United States Department of Defense (DoD) which provides financial and technical assistance, transfer of defense materiel, training and services to allies, and promotes military-to-military contacts.

Security cooperation is founded on a tradition of cooperation between the United States and other sovereign nations with similar values and interests in order to meet common defense goals. It consists of a group of programs authorized by the U.S. Foreign Assistance Act of 1961, as amended, and the Arms Export Control Act of 1976, as amended, and related statutes by which the DoD or commercial contractors provide defense articles and services in furtherance of national policies and objectives.

== History ==
Founded in 1971, the Defense Security Assistance Agency was renamed the Defense Security Cooperation Agency effective October 1, 1998.

In September 2019, DSCA established the Defense Security Cooperation University (DSCU) in order to train, certify, and support the long-term development of the Department of Defense's security cooperation workforce, later expanding its mission to include research, analysis, institutional capacity building, and the management and implementation of international military education, training, and cooperation programs worldwide.

== Foreign military sales (FMS) ==
Foreign military sales (FMS) and International Military Education and Training (IMET) are two key programs included within Security Cooperation. IMET is conducted solely on a grant basis. FMS can be conducted through direct payments of foreign states or United States Foreign Military Financing (FMF). Foreign Military Sales division is the core activity of DSCA, and yearly sales are between US$30-50 billion. In fiscal year 2020, US corporations sold $50.8 billion through FMS, and $124.3 billion through direct commercial sales.

FMS is a U.S. government to foreign government agreement, and DSCA acts as agent for procurement mostly for American defense company and aerospace companies or for DoD stocks. On any given day, DSCA is managing “14,000 open foreign military sales cases with 185 countries,” the DSCA director Lt. Gen. Charles Hooper explained at the Brookings Institution in June 2019.

FMS is managed and operated by DoD on a no-profit and no-loss basis. Countries participating in the program pay for defense articles and services at prices which recoup costs incurred by the United States. This includes a fee to cover the cost of administering the program.

== Regional centers ==
DSCA has six regional centers. They are:

- Africa Center for Strategic Studies
- Asia-Pacific Center for Security Studies
- George C. Marshall European Center for Security Studies
- William J. Perry Center for Hemispheric Defense Studies
- Near East South Asia Center for Strategic Studies.
- Ted Stevens Arctic Center for Security Studies
