= Africa Center for Strategic Studies =

U.S. Department of Defense institution

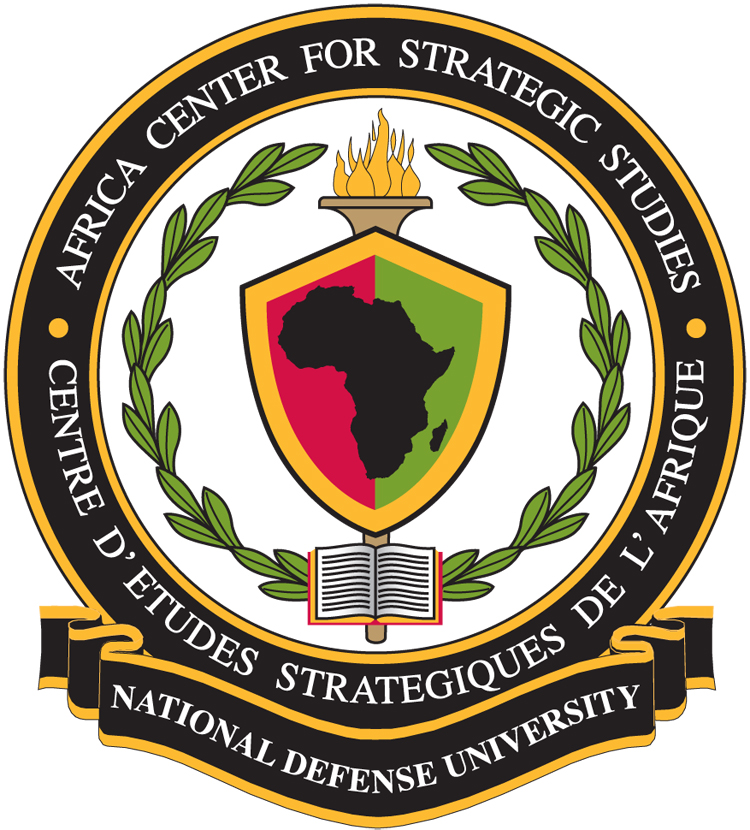
- Official logo
- Established: 1999
- Director: Amanda Dory
- Owner: United States Department of Defense
- Address: National Defense University, 300 5th Avenue, Building 20, Fort Lesley J. McNair, Washington, DC 20319-5066
- Location: Washington, D.C., United States
- Website: Official website

The Africa Center for Strategic Studies (ACSS) is self-described as "a U.S. Department of Defense institution established and funded by Congress for the study of security issues relating to Africa and serving as a forum for bilateral and multilateral research, communication, and exchange of ideas involving military and civilian participants."

It is a Regional Center of the National Defense University, which describes it as "[supporting] United States foreign and security policies by strengthening the strategic capacity of African states to identify and resolve security challenges in ways that promote civil-military cooperation, respect for democratic values, and safeguard human rights."

== Origin ==
In 1994 the United States European Command petitioned the Chairman of the US House International Relations Committee to create a Center on African Affairs that emulated the George C. Marshall European Center for Security Studies.

The Africa Center for Strategic Studies was formally established in March 1999. In 2004, the Center relocated to Building 20 (Grant Hall) on the campus of the Department of Defense’s National Defense University at Fort Lesley J. McNair, Washington, D.C., where it is one of five regional centers.

In 2007, ACSS began a working partnership with the recently established U.S. Africa Command.

== Region of engagement ==
ACSS's region of engagement includes all African countries. However, engagement with Algeria, Egypt, Libya, Mauritania, Morocco, and Tunisia is shared with the Near East South Asia Center for Strategic Studies. Since ACSS is based in Washington, D.C., the Center also engages local Africa specialists.

=== Regional offices ===
In September 2004, the Africa Center recommended establishing four Africa Center Regional Offices. The first regional office was opened in Addis Ababa, Ethiopia on October 26, 2006. In November 2008, a second Regional Office was opened in Dakar, Senegal.

The goal of the ACSS Regional Offices was to establish long-term and visible Africa Center presence on the continent. Specifically, the Regional Offices helped to strengthen relationships with African governments, international organizations, the African Union and sub-regional organizations, and other partner institutions across the continent. The Regional Offices build outreach programs and provide support for ACSS Community Members and organized Community Chapters. They planned and executed ACSS activities in support of ACSS headquarters and host governments. In addition, the Regional Offices fostered strong working ties with African defense, military, and civic leaders to advance common policy objectives.

Due to Department of Defense budget cuts, ACSS Regional Offices were identified for closure in the summer of 2014. Their outreach mission was transferred to the main campus in Washington, D.C.

==== East Africa Regional Office (EARO) ====
Based in Addis Ababa, Ethiopia, EARO promoted bilateral dialogue through continuous engagement with the African Union (AU), the Intergovernmental Authority for Development (IGAD), the Institute for Security Studies (ISS), Ethiopian International Institute for Peace and Development, the European Union, African Military Attachés Association, EASBRIG, African Standby Forces, and the U.S. Mission to the AU. EARO also maintained and expanded ACSS alumni networks and community chapters. Of these, the International Alumni Chapter played a critical role in advancing the policy dialogue on China’s role in Africa, the referendum in Southern Sudan, and ongoing instability in Somalia and Eritrea. The East Africa office worked with the Combined Joint Task Force – Horn of Africa to support forums at Camp Lemonnier on issues of regional importance.

==== Regional Office for West Africa (ROWA) ====
Based in Dakar, Senegal, ROWA developed outreach strategies and proposals to address issues such as security sector governance and civil-military relations both at national and regional levels. Following a West Africa counter-narcotics workshop, ROWA provided regional expertise for ministerial-level dialogue on the subject and helped forge regional partnerships around the conclusions of the workshop. Other ROWA projects examined the opportunities and challenges facing the armed forces in developing policies, finding new financing channels, allocating resources, and creating structures to better integrate women in the armed forces. ROWA also partnered with the Economic Community of West African States (ECOWAS) by helping to build military capabilities, develop content on the dynamics and extent of transnational crimes in West Africa; its implications for national, sub-regional and global security including terrorism financing; and its impact on ongoing democratization, anti-corruption, development and public health efforts within West Africa.

== Senior leadership ==
In June 2014, Kate Almquist Knopf became director of the Africa Center for Strategic Studies. Joseph Siegle is Director of Research, and Daniel L. Hampton is Chief of Staff.

== Publications ==
The Center publishes security briefs, research papers and special reports.

== Other regional centers ==
ACSS is one of five regional centers that fall under the Defense Security Cooperation Agency. The other centers include:

- Asia-Pacific Center for Security Studies
- Near East South Asia Center for Strategic Studies
- George C. Marshall European Center for Security Studies
- William J. Perry Center for Hemispheric Defense Studies
