= Bahrain Aid Flotilla =

Flotilla in support of the Bahraini opposition

The Bahrain Aid Flotilla was an effort to show solidarity with the people of Bahrain during the Bahraini uprising.

The flotilla was announced on May 10, 2011. Organizers stated their intention of commemorating poet Ayat al-ghermezi. Mehdi Eghrarian, leader of the Iranian Association of Islamic Revolution Followers, announced that the flotilla would depart the Persian Gulf seaport of Bushehr on May 16. Other Iranian news reports stated that the convoy would sail on may 14 and that organizers welcomed "university and seminary students, and Muslims from other countries," to join them.
