= International reactions to the Arab Spring =

The international reactions to the Arab Spring have been disparate, including calls for expanded liberties and civil rights in many authoritarian countries of the Middle East and North Africa in late 2010 and 2011.

== General statements ==
- Australia — Foreign Minister Kevin Rudd wrote an op-ed for The Australian published 20 May 2011 entitled "Keep the faith with the Arab spring." Rudd compared the struggle of Arabs demonstrating for political reforms and democratisation to the sputtering pro-democracy movements within Australia's geographic proximity in Fiji, Indonesia and Myanmar, as well as more successful democratisation efforts in India, South Africa, and Turkey. He also indicated Australian support for the protesters, writing, "The Arab democratic revolutions have made it clear that democracy is not something called for by the West. The call for democracy came resoundingly from within and to the complete surprise of the outside world. Now the international community has a responsibility to stand in support of Arab citizens in their call for democracy, human rights and the rule of law... That is why countries like Australia take a long-term approach to supporting democracy."
- Botswana — At a seminar on 16 June 2011 held by the Africa Center for Strategic Studies, Permanent Secretary of Defence, Justice and Security Segakweng Tsiane, representing the Botswana government, called the Arab Spring a "wakeup call." She said the popular uprisings in Egypt, Tunisia, and other countries indicated that those governments did not do enough to accommodate the desires of their citizenry. Tsiane expressed dissatisfaction with the way the Arab Spring has manifested, however, saying that inclusive national dialogue would be preferable to uprisings.
- Canada — Canadian daily The Globe and Mail has suggested that "Canada's cautious approach toward the Arab Spring democracy movements is in contrast to many other G8 nations." Despite his stiff criticism of crackdowns by the Libyan, Syrian, and Yemeni governments, Prime Minister Stephen Harper said on 26 May that his government believed international aid to post-revolutionary countries should be provided by regional financial institutions such as the African Development Bank. Canada, he said, would not offer more direct financial assistance to countries revolutionised by the Arab Spring.
- Eritrea — In an extended question-and-answer session posted on the Eritrean Ministry of Information website in late May and early June, President Isaias Afewerki said the events in the Arab world should be viewed as separate but inter-related, with corruption, socioeconomic stratification, and dependence on foreign governments being a factor common to many of the countries that experienced unrest. He blamed the United States for a Middle Eastern policy he said created "chaos...in a creative way to further their aims and interests". He criticised "external intervention" in the affairs of Tunisia, Egypt, Libya, Yemen, and other countries affected by the uprisings and said, "The fact remains that every people must solve their own problems according to their own convictions and without any external interference." Afewerki suggested that at least some of the protests were sparked and fueled by the West, saying, "These developments have served to teach a lesson to everyone about the wayward western policies in the last 20 years." He accused the West of attempting to create a New World Order by manipulating organisations like the African Union and the Arab League into interfering with countries to Western countries' advantage.
- France — Foreign Minister Alain Juppé spoke at the Arab World Institute for a symposium on the Arab Spring in Paris on 16 April. He took a tone of humility, acknowledging that the revolutionary wave came as a "surprise" to France and admitting, "For too long we thought that the authoritarian regimes were the only bastions against extremism in the Arab world. Too long, we have brandished the Islamist threat as a pretext for justifying to an extent turning a blind eye on governments which were flouting freedom and curbing their country's development." Juppé compared the Arab Spring favourably to the Islamic Golden Age and said, "We mustn't be afraid of this 'Arab Spring'." He said that while France does not have a policy of supporting "regime change", it intends to speak up for human rights in the Arab world and back transitions to democracy in North Africa, a region with which France has historically had close ties. He expressed confidence in protesters and concluded the speech by saying he was hopeful about the outcome of the Arab Spring. President Nicolas Sarkozy urged G8 countries to agree on a financial aid package to post-revolutionary Egypt and Tunisia on 26 May in response to requests by the transitional authorities in Egypt and Tunisia for money.
- Israel — On 14 April, Foreign Minister Avigdor Lieberman claimed that only economic stability would lead to political stability in the Arab world. He called the Arab Spring "an opportunity for the Arab world to move to democracy and prosperity" but emphasised that his government considers "the security of Israel," with a history of political and ethnic tensions within the Muslim-majority Middle East, to be paramount.
- Kazakhstan — Prime Minister Karim Masimov told Reuters on 2 April that his government is paying close attention to the protests and revolutions in the Middle East and North Africa. Masimov suggested that a lack of educational opportunities and social mobility, which he claimed were not major problems in Kazakhstan compared to in Egypt and Tunisia, had contributed to the revolutionary fervor gripping the Arab world. "What is the biggest difference between them and us?" Masimov asked rhetorically. "People in Kazakhstan, the young generation in Kazakhstan, have hope and they have an opportunity to go forward." He admitted that the Arab Spring highlighted political reforms needed in Astana and said Kazakhstan would transition peacefully toward democracy without experiencing the turmoil that the Arab world was going through.
- Kyrgyzstan — On 8 June, President Roza Otunbayeva addressed the World Economic Forum in Vienna, and spoke briefly about the Arab Spring. Otunbayeva, who came to power as Kyrgyzstan's interim leader after the 2010 Kyrgyzstani revolution and presided during a parliamentary election that gave a counter-revolutionary party a plurality, said: "After what happened in North Africa and the Middle East, slowly European countries started recognising that it's unacceptable, outrageous, that those dictators shoot their people," and urged other Central Asian countries to follow Kyrgyzstan's example or risk experiencing a revolution like those in Tunisia and Egypt.
- Malaysia — In a speech on Islam and moderation in Oxford, England, on 17 May, Prime Minister Najib Razak touched on the events of the Arab Spring, noting the "overwhelming" pace and scale of the unrest in the Middle East and North Africa. He added, "But amidst the chaos and the confusion we should not lose sight of the fact that these countries and peoples now face a fateful choice: the choice between extremism and intolerance ... and a peaceful, democratic moderation that will grant them more freedom of expression, not less." In stating Malaysia's support for the Palestinian nationalist movement, he pointedly added, "In supporting the Palestinian and other righteous causes, Malaysia will not support violence against non-combatants, civilians, women, children, the aged and infirm." Najib suggested moderates could prevail in the Arab Spring and break the cycle of violence and oppression in the region, comparing the situation to the aftermath of the Good Friday Agreement in Northern Ireland, the Indian independence movement, and civil rights struggles in South Africa and the United States.
- New Zealand — On 2 August, Foreign Affairs Minister Murray McCully expressed his government's optimism for a positive outcome to the Arab Spring, in his opinion; while also ultimately cautioning that "this transition process will not be straightforward [and] we cannot take the changes for granted." McCully remarked on the unexpected nature of the uprisings and said: "What we do know is that we are now dealing with a series of very different leadership models and high expectations for a better future. While elites remain unchanged in many countries, Arab leaders will have to become more responsive to their people." He also said New Zealand was engaging with Arab governments and had offered its diplomatic and economic support to transitional authorities in Egypt, Libya and Tunisia.
- Russia — President Dmitri Medvedev voiced consternation over the Arab Spring on 14 June, telling his Uzbekistani counterpart President Islam Karimov that he hoped it would bring about an outcome "that is clear and predictable for us." He said the revolutionary wave could destabilise Russia and its neighbours. On 14 July, he compared the Arab Spring to the fall of the Berlin Wall and said it proved that "socioeconomic reforms, reforms that would take into account the interests of the widest majority of the population, must be carried out in due time".
- Turkey — At a summit in Istanbul in mid-March, Prime Minister Recep Tayyip Erdoğan said the revolts in the region signified a popular "demand for change." He warned that Arab governments would be well suited to be responsive to their people's demands and refrain from using violence or coercion. Erdoğan stressed that Turkey will not intervene in the affairs of other countries, but it "will continue to offer sincere and constructive criticism."
- United Kingdom — Prime Minister David Cameron expressed both enthusiasm and caution about the Arab Spring at the G8 meeting in late May 2011, offering financial assistance to post-revolutionary Egypt and Tunisia and saying, "I want a very simple and clear message to come out of this summit, and that is that the most powerful nations on earth have come together and are saying to those in the Middle East and North Africa who want greater democracy, greater freedom, greater civil rights, we are on your side." On the other hand, the British government also criticised the attempted revolution in Bahrain, with the British ambassador to the country alleging Iranian support for "those bent on violence" in contrast to British attitudes towards the Arab spring in other countries. He warned that if Western governments did not provide aid, prolonged chaos in the region could breed Islamic extremism and accelerate the pace of immigration by North Africans to European countries, something Foreign Secretary William Hague said the UK believed to be unacceptable earlier in the month; however, with a note of caution; to be caught-amongst those supporting; & fighting against, greater involvement, with arab spring politics, in the larger towns; & cities of the UK-{in specific, the north}-is not a moorish pleasure to be sipped; & savoured; its pretty heated debate.
  - Just a day after Cameron's remarks, The Observer reported that British officers were training snipers and elite security forces in Saudi Arabia that had been deployed to squelch protesters calling for reforms in Saudi Arabia as well as neighboring Bahrain. On 17 June, Hague described the Arab Spring as a more transformational event than the September 11 attacks of 2001 and claimed that "the real nature of the Arab world is expressed in Tahrir Square, not at Ground Zero".
- United States — On 19 May, President Barack Obama gave a foreign policy speech to an invited audience and members of the press at the State Department in regards to the Arab Spring. He contrasted the ideology of al Qaeda leader Osama bin Laden, recently killed by US Navy SEALS, with that of pro-democracy protesters in the Middle East and North Africa, saying: "By the time we found bin Laden, al Qaeda's agenda had come to be seen by the vast majority of the region as a dead end, and the people of the Middle East and North Africa had taken their future into their own hands." Obama praised the demonstrators, comparing their efforts to bring about reform to the actions of the Boston Tea Party and Rosa Parks in American history. He criticized socioeconomic stratification in the Middle East, saying, "The nations of the Middle East and North Africa won their independence long ago, but in too many places their people did not. In too many countries, power has been concentrated in the hands of the few." He added that "through the moral force of non-violence, the people of the region have achieved more change in six months than terrorists have accomplished in decades. Obama also pledged to continue U.S. security policy in the region, but said he would also emphasize the opposition of the United States to violent and repressive governmental responses to the Arab Spring and its support for human rights and democratic reforms, claiming, "Our support for these principles is not a secondary interest... [It] will be the policy of the United States to promote reform across the region, and to support transitions to democracy."

== Varying reactions ==
Harsh government responses to protests in many Arab countries have met international condemnation.

France, the former colonial ruler of Tunisia, refused to denounce President Zine el-Abidine Ben Ali's attempt to disperse demonstrators in his country by force in January 2011 prior to the Tunisian revolution; Foreign Affairs Minister Michèle Alliot-Marie said the French "must not stand out as lesson-givers" in Tunisia, while the French minister for agriculture defended Ben Ali, saying, "President Ben Ali is someone who's frequently judged badly, [but] he's done a lot of things." The French government later took a leading role in supporting the opposition to Colonel Muammar al-Gaddafi in Libya, forming a tripartite alliance with the United Kingdom and Lebanon on the United Nations Security Council to successfully lobby for international military intervention, though it was Peru that was the first country to sever bilateral relations with the government in Tripoli over the crackdown on Libyan protesters in February 2011.

The government of Iran condemned the Egyptian government's response to protests and was harshly critical of the Bahraini monarchy's reaction to the demonstrations in the Gulf archipelago, but has virtually ignored President Bashar al-Assad's violent suppression of protests during the uprising in Syria and according to the U.S. government, has possibly provided aid to suppressing the protests.

Conversely, while Qatar staked out its place as a primary backer of the attempted revolution against Gaddafi and a "key ally" of the partially recognized National Transitional Council, the provisional government of the self-declared Libyan Republic, it steadfastly supported the supranational Gulf Co-operation Council in its military intervention to quell protests in neighboring Bahrain, contributing troops to the Peninsula Shield Force mission there.

The government of Morocco received praise from the U.S. government for its response to major protests, though the U.S. condemned the governments of Tunisia, Libya, Egypt, Bahrain, Syria, and Yemen for their actions in dealing with demonstrators. However, it has stopped short of calling for regime change in Bahrain alone among those states.

Saudi Arabia was one of the first Arab countries to publicly condemn the Syrian government over its reaction to the uprising in that country, with King Abdullah of Saudi Arabia giving a televised speech shortly after midnight on 8 August to announce the recall of its ambassador from Damascus and warn authorities to institute major reforms and stop all violence. However, it was also the largest contributor of troops to GCC operations to help suppress the Bahraini uprising, as well as a vocal supporter of Bahrain's embattled monarchy amidst protests and violence in Manama. Saudi Arabia also supported a GCC-sponsored transition agreement to bring peace to Yemen and phase out the incumbent government there, which was repeatedly rebuffed despite Saudi pressure. After an attempt on Yemeni President Ali Abdullah Saleh's life, Saudi authorities allowed the wounded leader to undergo several months of hospital treatment in Riyadh, the Saudi Arabian capital, but eventually allowed him to return home despite earlier suggestions that he would be contained in Saudi Arabia.

Reactions around the world turned many into activists from afar when the effects of the Arab Spring began to affect their loved ones still in these countries. After seeing the personal nature of the repression, many who were abroad began to speak out, creating a global network that would help hold these leaders accountable. While many citizens abroad typically feared coming out against their own government, by the time the Libyan government began to fall most were actively speaking against their government's oppression.

For other countries in the region, foreign policy has been heavily shaped by the Arab Spring. For example, many in Turkey are calling for "zero problems with neighbors" approach which helps unify MENA countries by ending warfare and struggle across the region. This is a proactive response which recognizes a country like Turkey's unique influence in the region.

Interest in the Arab spring had a different tone around the world. In South Korea, for example, there was political coverage that focused on the causes of the Arab Spring but never really went into in depth analysis. This important difference is between the United States vested interest in the country compared to other countries across the globe. South Korea, an ever-increasing world power, has very little use in covering this story. Most of the newspapers took tones that reflected a possible sentiment similar to what people would feel in China and in North Korea but never really sought far to compare the two. Political coverage in these far reaching parts of the globe was dim because of the lack of national interest in these states.

In March 2011, just months after the protests started in Tunisia, Hillary Clinton commented on worldwide news sources, "Al Jazeera has been the leader in that are literally changing people's minds and attitudes. And like it or hate it, it is really effective." Clinton's State Department even began tweeting in Arabic and Persian. Global communication has become more prominent after Arab Spring to connect us all.

A divided international response can be seen between the United States and Russia. While the United States openly supported any group looking for democratic representation, Russia took a much more hands-off approach. Russia, an authoritarian state, has been seen supporting other authoritarian regimes in more geopolitically convenient areas. Northern Africa did not pose enough of a threat or advantage for Russia to become actively involved in the regime change, but nevertheless was a point of contention between Russia and the west.

=== Criticism of responses ===
Some scholars and pundits, including Slavoj Žižek and Robert Fisk, have argued that the range of international reactions to the various protests, uprisings, and revolutions associated with the Arab Spring demonstrate hypocrisy on the part of governments in the Western world and elsewhere. Žižek, a Slovenian political theorist, charged that the "western liberal reaction to the uprisings in Egypt and Tunisia frequently shows hypocrisy and cynicism".

When asked if he considered Hosni Mubarak, the Egyptian president, to be an "authoritarian ruler" prior to the popular movement that ousted him from power, the United States' President Barack Obama replied that he tends "not to use labels for folks", called him a "stalwart ally in many respects to the United States", and claimed that Mubarak "has been a force for stability and good in the region", something American journalist Jeremy Scahill criticized. Scahill also claimed that "the day before US missiles began raining down on ... Libya ... security forces under the control of Yemen's US-backed president, Ali Abdullah Saleh, massacred more than fifty people who were participating in an overwhelmingly peaceful protest". The Obama administration has since called for Saleh to hand over power to his vice president and commit to a transition to plural democracy for Yemen, but its comparative sluggishness in supporting the Yemeni protest movement versus its swift backing of Libyan protesters and rebel fighters faced some criticism. American academic and investigative journalist Nir Rosen also criticized the U.S. government for more than doubling military assistance to Yemen between 2009 and 2010.

During international operations in Libya, Irish journalist Patrick Cockburn called NATO's concern for Libyans "deeply hypocritical ... when they ignore or promote savage repression in Bahrain". Veteran British journalist Robert Fisk also condemned the relative lack of concern on the part of Western leaders over the security crackdown in Bahrain.

American philosopher and counterculture commentator Noam Chomsky claimed, "The U.S. and its allies will do anything they can to prevent authentic democracy in the Arab world. The reason is very simple. Across the region, an overwhelming majority of the population regards the United States as the main threat to their interests." It is known that the United States supported the regimes of Tunisia, Egypt and Yemen all the way up to and during the protests. The United States strategically changed its support when it became evident that the regimes were losing power. Israel considered these countries regimes a "strategic treasure."

Western leaders were not the only targets of rebuke from commentators for their reactions to the Arab Spring. Hezbollah chief Hassan Nasrallah's response to the uprisings also came under criticism, with Iranian academic Hamid Dabashi penning an op-ed for Al Jazeera in which he called Nasrallah a "once mighty warrior being bypassed by the force of history", accusing him of hypocrisy for supporting Shia protesters in Egypt and Bahrain but backing the "murderous" Shia government in Syria against peaceful demonstrators. Nasrallah, Dabashi claimed, had started out as a supporter of the Arab Spring when it appeared it would affect only allies of the West, but was deliberately silent on protests, including the Iranian protests, that sought to topple anti-Western governments.

British journalist Brian Whitaker said King Abdullah of Saudi Arabia "[betrayed] more than a little irony" in his condemnation of Bashar al-Assad's regime, considering Saudi Arabia's dearth of political freedom. He concluded that the Saudi monarchy's positioning on the Arab Spring protests was part of ongoing efforts to outmanoeuvre and isolate its traditional rival Iran, an ally of Assad, as well as to limit the actual amount of political liberalisation occurring in the region. Whitaker criticised the Saudi-sponsored GCC initiative in Yemen, claiming it "was meant to prevent a genuine revolution, not help to accomplish it", and called Saudi Arabia's actions amidst the regional unrest a "monarchical insurance scheme" evident in its intervention to support the Bahraini monarchy.

== World economy ==
As many of the world's major oil producing countries are in the Middle East, the unrest has caused a rise in oil prices. The International Monetary Fund accordingly revised its forecast for 2011 oil prices to reflect a higher price, and also reported that food prices could also increase. Additionally, concerns about Egypt's Suez Canal had raised shipping and oil prices.

The World Bank's June 2011 Global Economic Prospects report estimated that the turmoil may reduce growth in the region by 1 percent or more, with countries such as Egypt and Tunisia registering growth rates 3 or more percentage points lower than what they would have been in the absence of the crises. Overall GDP in Egypt is projected to rise 1.0 percent in 2011.

== Media coverage ==
Al Jazeera won viewers and prominence for its coverage of the protests, angering the governments of the countries in which they occurred. United States Secretary of State Hillary Clinton remarked: "Al Jazeera has been the leader in that they are literally changing people's minds and attitudes. And like it or hate it, it is really effective". She also stated that "viewership of Al Jazeera is going up in the United States because it's real news. You may not agree with it, but you feel like you're getting real news around the clock instead of a million commercials..."

The use of social media has been extensive. As one Egyptian activist tweeted during the protests, "We use Facebook to schedule the protests, Twitter to coordinate, and YouTube to tell the world". Internet censorship has also been a factor, and entire nation states were taken almost completely offline.

In an attempt to quantify the likelihood of regime change in Arab World countries following the protests, The Economist newspaper created its "Shoe-Thrower's index". The name is derived from shoeing: throwing shoes, showing the sole of one's shoe, or using shoes to insult, all of which are forms of protest primarily associated with the Arab world. According to their index, Yemen has the highest likelihood of a revolution, whereas Qatar has the lowest. The index factors in the number of years the current ruler has been in power, the percentage of the population consisting of young people, per capita GDP, democracy index, political corruption, and freedom of the press. BBC News used its own "Unrest Index" in its analysis of the protests.

Alen Mattich of the Wall Street Journal created the "Revolting Index" to rate the likelihood of revolts by state based on "social unfairness, propensity to revolt, and a trigger". Mattich readily admits, however, that "the methodology is crude. There's been no econometric work done".
