= Michael J. Mazarr =

American political scientist

- Education: Georgetown University (BA, MA), University of Maryland (PhD)
- Occupation(s): Political scientist, analyst
- Employer(s): RAND Corporation; Georgetown University

Michael J. Mazarr (born 1965) is an American political scientist. He is currently a senior political scientist at the RAND Corporation and an adjunct professor at the Center for Security Studies at Georgetown University.

== Education ==
Mazarr holds a BA and MA in government and national security studies from Georgetown University and a PhD in public policy from the University of Maryland.

== Career ==
Mazarr formerly was associate dean of academics at the U.S. National War College and President of the Stimson Center. He also served as special assistant to the Chairman of the Joint Chiefs of Staff from December 2008 to January 2010.

== Publications ==
=== Books ===
- Mazarr, M. J. (1995). North Korea and the Bomb. St. Martin’s Press. ISBN 978-0-312-12443-4.
- Mazarr, M. J. (2019). Leap of Faith: Hubris, Negligence, and America's Greatest Foreign Policy Tragedy. PublicAffairs. ISBN 978-1-5417-6836-9.

=== Articles ===
- Mazarr, M. J. (2018), Understanding Deterrence, RAND Corporation, doi:10.7249/PE295
- The Looming Crisis in the South China Sea, Foreign Affairs, February 9, 2024
