= Asia-Pacific Center for Security Studies =

US Department of Defense outreach center

Daniel K. Inouye Asia-Pacific Center for Security Studies
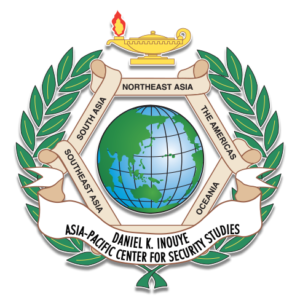

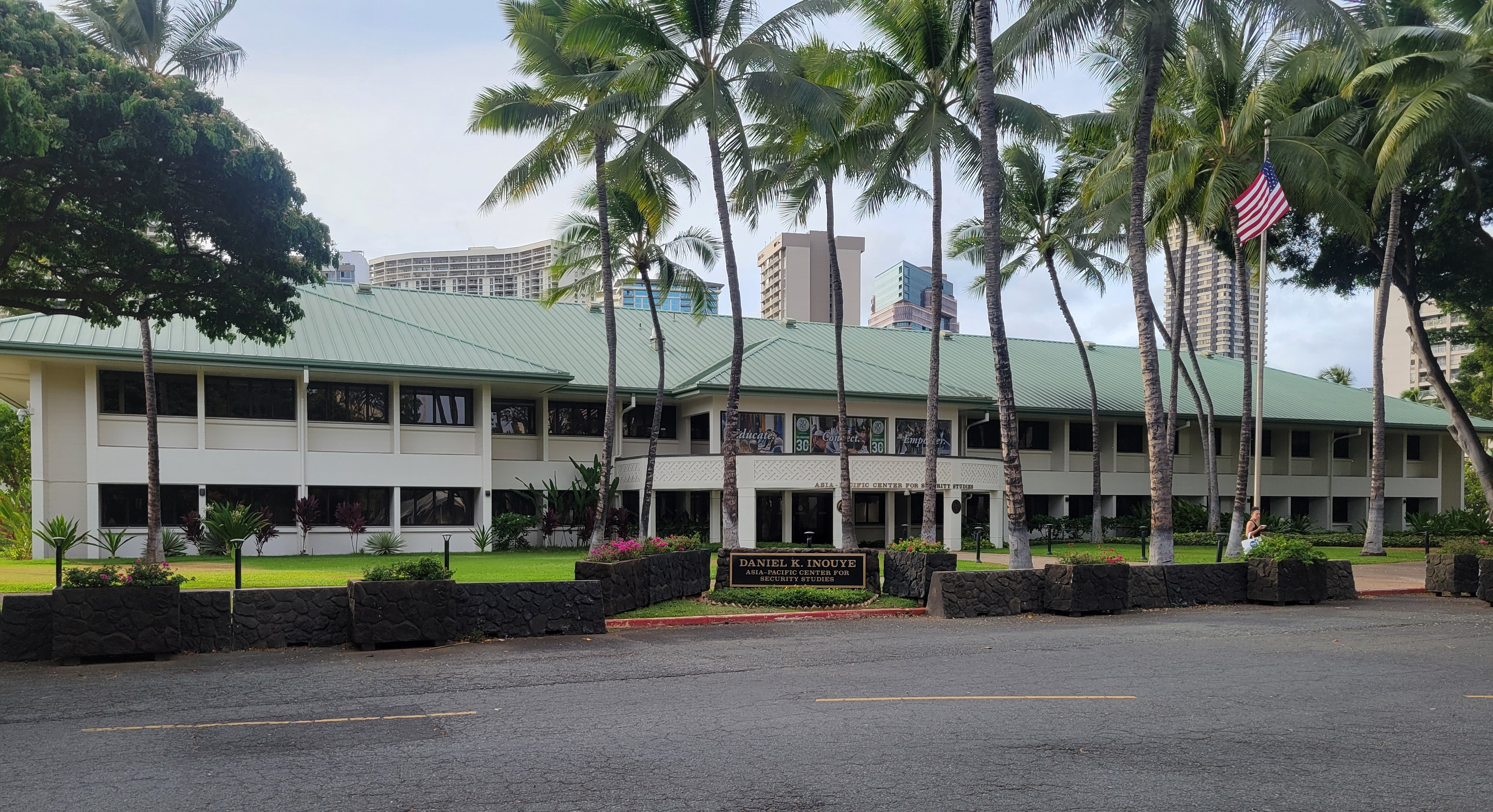
- Center in 2025

Agency overview
- Formed: 1995
- Jurisdiction: United States Government
- Headquarters: 2058 Maluhia Rd, Honolulu, Hawaii, United States; 21.28°N 157.83°W
- Employees: 130
- Agency executives: Suzanne Vares-Lum, Director; Russell Bailey, Deputy Director
- Parent agency: Department of Defense; Defense Security Cooperation Agency
- Website: https://dkiapcss.edu/

The Daniel K. Inouye Asia-Pacific Center for Security Studies (DKI APCSS) is a U.S. Department of Defense institute that officially opened September 4, 1995, in Honolulu, Hawaii. The Center addresses regional and global security issues, inviting military and civilian representatives of the United States and Asia-Pacific nations to its comprehensive program of executive reeducation and workshops, both in Hawaii and throughout the Asia-Pacific region.

The Center supports the Under Secretary of Defense for Policy and the U.S. Pacific Command by developing and sustaining relationships among security practitioners and national security establishments throughout the region. DKI APCSS’ mission is to build capacities and communities of interest by educating, connecting, and empowering security practitioners to advance Indo-Pacific security. It is one of the Department of Defense's six regional security studies centers.

The Center focuses on Executive Education via both resident and regional events. These academic events include resident courses, workshops, key leader engagements, and research projects. Senior military and government decision-makers in security-related positions from throughout the region participate in DKI APCSS courses. The Daniel K. Inouye Asia-Pacific Center for Security Studies is located on Fort DeRussy, in Waikiki, Hawaii.

== History ==
The first 12-week Executive Course began in September 1996 with 23 fellows from 12 countries. A total of ten executive courses and two senior executive courses were conducted at the Waikiki Trade Center.

In June, 2000, APCSS moved into its present home at Fort DeRussy. Formerly the home of the 9th Army Reserve Command, buildings were refurbished to house the center. An existing warehouse was converted into an auditorium and classroom and office spaces.

On August 23, 2000, the building was officially dedicated, with more than 300 VIPs and special guests in attendance. Speakers included: Senator Inouye, Admiral Dennis C. Blair Commander USPACOM, William Perry, former Secretary of Defense and Lt. Gen. H.C. Stackpole (USMC RET) APCSS president.

In September 2015, APCSS celebrated its 20th anniversary and officially changed its name from the Asia-Pacific Center for Security Studies to the Daniel K. Inouye Asia-Pacific Center for Security Studies.

== Resident Programs ==
Resident programs include:

- Comprehensive Security Cooperation Course (CSC)
- Indo-Pacific Orientation Course (IPOC)
- Transnational Security Cooperation (TSC)
- Multinational Armaments Resilience Seminar (MARS)

== Outreach: Resident & Regional ==
- Focused Outreach Events – DKI APCSS staff and faculty routinely travel throughout the Asia-Pacific region to conduct programs that aimed at finding solutions for complex security challenges.
- Workshops - DKI APCSS’ workshop program is a forum for key regional interagency, multinational security policy drafters and decision makers to develop cooperative approaches to these problems.
- Research- DKI APCSS faculty members conduct research and publish various publications available on their website.

== Alumni relations and notable alumni ==
DKI APCSS has more than 17,000 graduates.

Alumni in Senior Positions include:

- President (4)
- Vice President/Deputy PM (3)
- Minister/Deputy Minister (35)
- Ambassador (151)
- Chief or Deputy Chief of Defense (15)
- Chief or Deputy Chief of Service (43)
- Cabinet or Parliament appointment (36)
- Advisor to Pres/King/Cabinet (29)

== Alumni associations ==
DKI APCSS has more than 59 alumni associations.

== Other regional centers ==
DKI APCSS is one of six regional centers that fall under the Defense Security Cooperation Agency. The other centers include:

- The George C. Marshall European Center for Security Studies
- The Africa Center for Strategic Studies
- William J. Perry Center for Hemispheric Defense Studies
- Near East South Asia Center for Strategic Studies
- Ted Stevens Arctic Center for Security Studies

== See also ==
- Whole-of-society
