= Hsieh Ping-cheng espionage case =

2023 Taiwan trial

The Hsieh Ping-cheng espionage case was a major treason case that occurred in the Republic of China (Taiwan) in 2023, involving retired officers of the Taiwanese Republic of China Army acting in concert with active-duty officers to collectively leak military secrets.

== Background ==
A total of ten individuals, including retired officer Chen Yu-hsin, Lieutenant Colonel Hsieh Ping-cheng, Major Hsiao Hsiang-yun, active-duty Lieutenant Colonel Hsieh Meng-shu of the Army Aviation and Special Forces Command, and Major Ho Hsin-ju of the Huadong Defense Command, were suspected of leaking military secrets to intelligence personnel of the People's Republic of China. The leaked information included live-fire exercises conducted during the Han Kuang Exercise, defense deployments of various theater commands, the presidential "National Defense Military Conference" (Project 0221, attended only by the President, the Chief of the General Staff, service commanders, theater commanders, and presidential staff members such as the Secretary-General of the National Security Council, with no more than five or six participants), and the "Ku-an Operational Plan". The latter included such highly classified materials as reviews and improvement measures for counter-air and air superiority combat simulations, reviews and improvement measures for maritime combat simulations, responses of the ROC Armed Forces to a rapid invasion of Taiwan by the People's Liberation Army, specific measures for central defense operations, evaluation reports on the ROC military's joint intelligence, surveillance, reconnaissance, information, and electronic warfare capabilities, plans for naval mine warfare, the "rapid Taiwan seizure" scenario, and other important force deployments, operational plans, and classified programs involving cooperation with the United States.

These individuals also participated in a psychological warfare video filmed by serviceman Lu Chun-fang declaring, "I am willing to surrender to the People's Liberation Army". They further attempted to induce Lieutenant Colonel Hsieh Meng-shu to defect to the People's Liberation Army by flying a CH-47 Chinook helicopter, offering a reward of NT$480 million.

== Discovery ==
The case was uncovered in late July 2023 through a joint operation by the Military Security General Headquarters of the Ministry of National Defense and the Taiwan High Prosecutors Office. The suspects were indicted on charges including violations of the National Security Act and accepting bribes in breach of official duties under the Anti-Corruption Act. On 11 December, then Minister of National Defense Chiu Kuo-cheng, four-star rank general, declined to disclose details of the case during a media interview, but described it as "the greatest humiliation" in the history of the Republic of China Armed Forces. During questioning by legislator Tsai Shih-ying at the Legislative Yuan's Foreign Affairs and National Defense Committee, Chiu stated that seven active-duty officers had been indicted and that the case had been proactively detected by the Ministry of National Defense and national security agencies. Chen Yu-lin, Lieutenant general of the Political Warfare Bureau, further stated that the investigation had begun in May.

== Aftermath ==
On 22 August 2024, the Taiwan High Court concluded the case. Former Lieutenant Colonel Hsieh Meng-shu of the Army Aviation and Special Forces Command, who had already been dismissed from service, was convicted of conspiring to defect to mainland China by piloting a CH-47 Chinook helicopter. Former serviceman Lu Chun-fang, who had also been dismissed from service, was convicted for filming a psychological warfare video expressing his willingness to surrender to the government of the People's Republic of China.Hsiao Hsiang-yun was sentenced to 13 years in prison; Lieutenant Colonel Hsieh Meng-shu of the Army Aviation and Special Forces Command to 9 years; businessman and retired lieutenant colonel Hsieh Ping-cheng to 8 years; Major operations officer Ho Hsin-ju of the Huadong Defense Command to 7 years and 4 months; Major intelligence officer Kang Yi-pin of the Kinmen Defense Command Guard Battalion to 7 years and 2 months; Captain Hung Jui-yang of the Army's 104th Infantry Brigade to 7 years; Lu Chun-fang to 5 years and 6 months; and Sergeant Liu Li-chi of the Tainan Reserve Brigade to 1 year and 6 months. An officer surnamed Wu was acquitted. The ruling remained subject to appeal.

On 13 February 2025, the Supreme Court dismissed the appeals, making the verdict final.
