= Saudi Arabia–Taiwan relations =

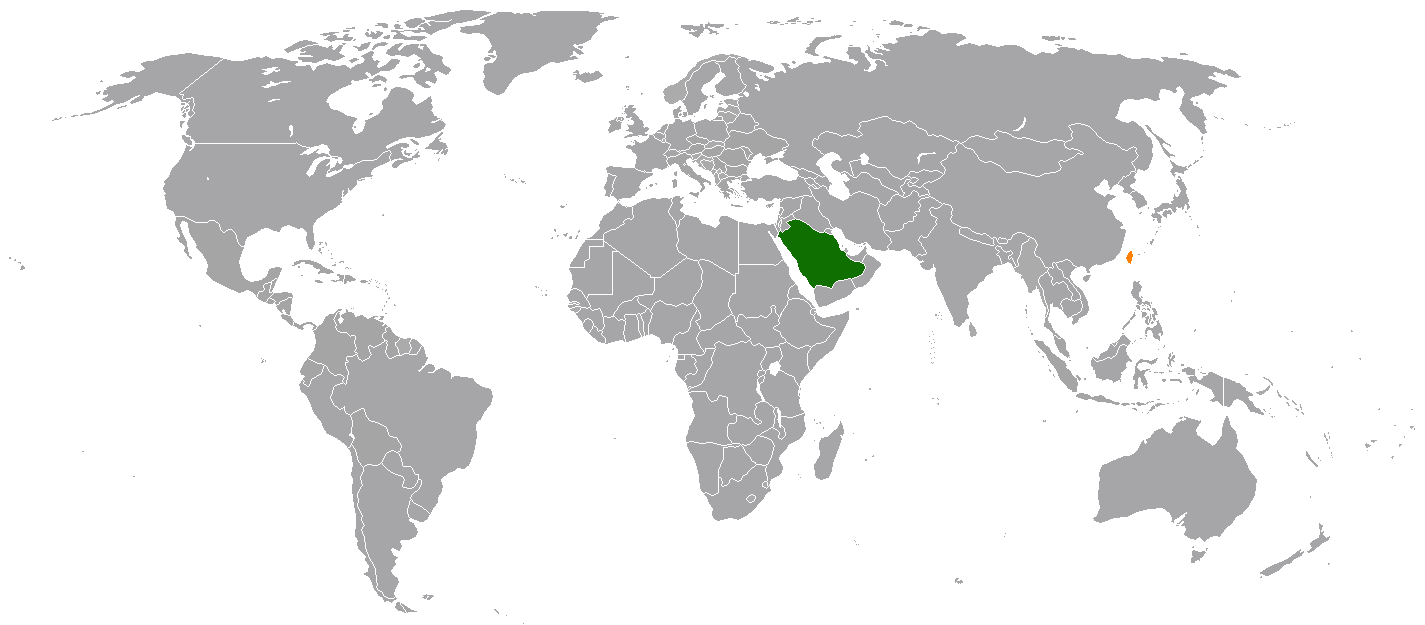
- Saudi Arabia: Taiwan

Diplomatic mission
- Saudi Arabian Trade Office in Taipei: Taipei Economic and Cultural Representative Office in Saudi Arabia

Envoy
- Head of Mission Adel Fahad A. Althaidi: Representative Chang Chih-Ping

Saudi Arabia and the Republic of China (Taiwan) have had a long relationship with diplomatic, military, and commercial elements. Relations formally existed until 1990 after which Saudi Arabia recognized the People's Republic of China (PRC).

== Diplomatic relations ==
After World War II, the Republic of China maintained diplomatic relations with only a few Middle Eastern countries, one of which was Saudi Arabia. The Republic of China lost control of the mainland and decamped to the island of Taiwan, formerly a Qing region that was then under colonial rule by the Empire of Japan until 1945 when it was acquired by the ROC.

The Hui Muslim General Ma Bufang was appointed as the first Republic of China ambassador to Saudi Arabia. This was for two reasons. The first reason was largely out of economic necessity, as Saudi Arabia was the largest supplier of oil to the ROC, with Taiwan's state-run Chinese Petroleum Company, importing about 40% of its oil annually from Saudi Arabia.

As Nationalist China was so reliant on Saudi Arabia's oil supplies, the ROC put a significant amount of effort into maintaining relations. The second reason for the friendliness of the Chinese Nationalist government towards Saudi Arabia was because since 1949, Saudi Arabia was one of the most influential countries to recognize the Chinese Nationalist regime on Taiwan, even after it lost its seat on the UN Security Council in 1971. Citing respect for Islamic religion was another. Saudi Arabia was the only Arab country which voted against the PRC taking over the ROC's seat at the UN. Both countries were in the anti-communist camp.

The first state visit of the post-Chiang Kai-shek era was a 1977 visit by President Yen Chia-kan to Saudi Arabia.

Saudi Arabia ended its recognition of the Republic of China in July 1990, when it established official diplomatic relations with China (People's Republic of China).

== Military relations ==
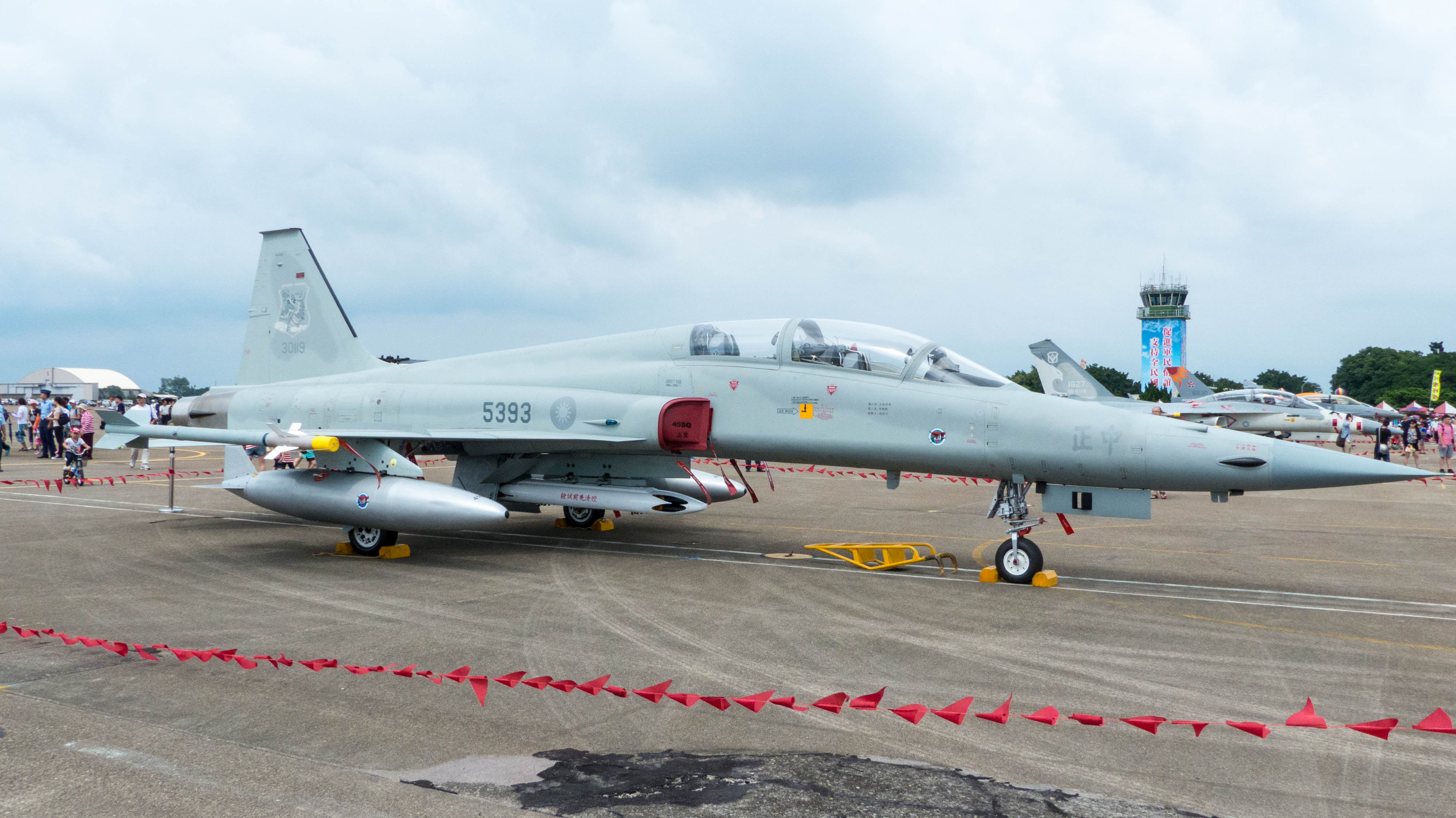
ROCAF F-5F similar to those flown over Yemen

From 1979 to 1990, the Republic of China (Taiwan) military engaged in a secret classified military aid program in the Yemen Arab Republic known as the Peace Bell Program or the Great Desert Program (大漠計畫) at the behest of Saudi Arabia by deploying over 1000 Taiwanese soldiers, including elite commandos from Taiwan’s Special Forces and Taiwan Air Force jet fighter pilots to fight in combat operations in Yemen. Due to Yemen not having any of their own trained pilots, the Taiwanese Air Force pilots decided to fly Yemeni F-5 jet fighters in thousands of combat operations and manned air defense batteries against a South Yemeni military force composed of Cuban Special Forces and Soviet Russian Spetznaz as well as additional Cuban and Soviet Russian supporting troops, jet fighters and naval warships. The program ended in 1990 when Saudi Arabia withdrew its diplomatic recognition of Taiwan. During this eleven year war in Yemen the Republic of China (Taiwan) military forces were actively involved in continuous full scale combat with the opposing two combined military forces of Cuba and the Russian Soviet Union and for all intents and purposes Taiwanese jet fighter pilots constituted the Yemen Arab Republic's Air Force during this time since Yemen lacked highly trained military personnel at this time and was in desperate need of Taiwan’s military protection during this war. The highly trained Taiwanese pilots scored thousands of kills in combat operations against the Cuban and Soviet Russian military forces while the Taiwanese air-defense and early warning radar teams also took some casualties from aerial attacks by the Cuban and Soviet Russian military.

== Commercial relations ==
Commercial relations between Taiwan and Saudi Arabia began around 1965 and were initially based on an agricultural relationship. As a way to demonstrate rice cultivation, Taiwan sent agricultural missions to Saudi Arabia. Then, in 1973, the two countries signed an agricultural cooperation agreement, in which Taiwan provided Saudi Arabia with a number of assistance programs, including irrigation, mechanized cultivation, soil, meteorology, crop rotation, and fishing technology. In 1978, Taiwan also began providing technical assistance in the field of health care. Taiwan has even provided Saudi Arabia with a number of doctors and nurses.

Taiwan also provided significant technical assistance to Saudi Arabia. In 1973, Taiwan's largest heavy construction company, Ret-Ser Engineering Agency (RSEA), began working on the 110-kilometer Mecca to Hawiya highway in Saudi Arabia. This led to other large projects like the Shaar highway. Other projects included the construction of an industrial park and sewage system, offshore and onshore work in the Saudi Naval Expansion Program, and housing for the King Abd al-Aziz Military Academy and King Khalid Military City. As of 1984, RSEA's projects in Taiwan amounted to a total dollar value of $1.3 billion. The majority of trade between the two nations consisted of petroleum from Saudi Arabia and building materials and consumer goods from Taiwan, and potentially by the granting of Saudi Arabia on Research and Development of Renewable Energy.

In 2020, Taiwan signed a double taxation avoidance agreement with Saudi Arabia. Saudi Arabia became the first Arab nation to have such an agreement with Taiwan and took effect on January 1, 2021.

== Representative offices ==
In 1957, the ROC consulate in Jeddah was upgraded to an embassy. Saudi Arabia opened an embassy in Taiwan in 1968, before that relations had been handled through the Saudi embassy in Japan.

Saudi Arabia is represented in Taipei by a representative office known as the Saudi Arabian Trade Office in Taipei. Similarly, Taiwan maintains a Taipei Economic and Cultural Representative Office in the Kingdom of Saudi Arabia in Riyadh. On 27 July 2017, Taiwan suspended its representative office in Jeddah and the task of the office was given to the Riyadh office.

== See also ==
- Foreign relations of Taiwan
- Foreign relations of Saudi Arabia
- China–Saudi Arabia relations
- Taiwan–Middle East relations
