= List of diplomatic missions in Saudi Arabia =

This is a list of diplomatic missions in Saudi Arabia. There are currently 128 embassies in Riyadh. Several countries have diplomatic missions accredited from other capitals. In addition, many countries maintain consulates in other Saudi Arabian cities such as Jeddah and Dhahran (not including honorary consulates).

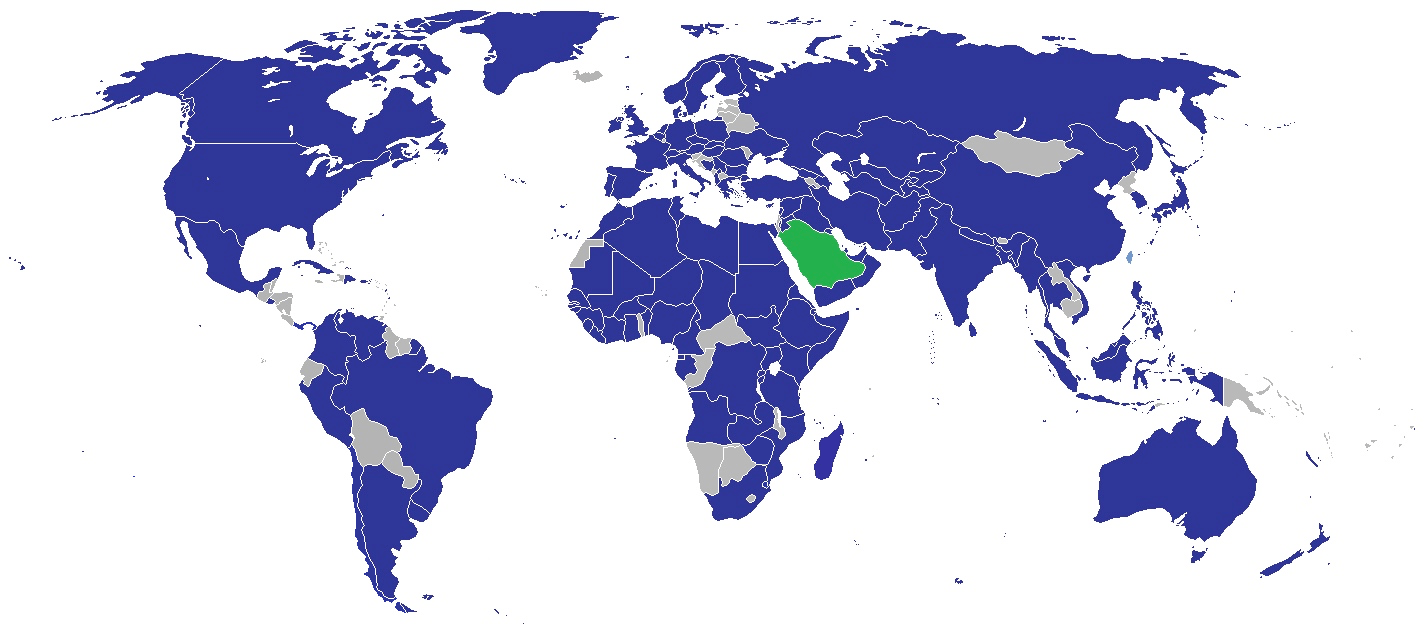
Map of diplomatic missions in Saudi Arabia

== Diplomatic missions in Riyadh ==
=== Embassies ===
1. Afghanistan
2. Albania
3. Algeria
4. Angola
5. Argentina
6. Australia
7. Austria
8. Azerbaijan
9. Bahrain
10. Bangladesh
11. Belgium
12. Benin
13. Bosnia and Herzegovina
14. Brazil
15. Brunei
16. Bulgaria
17. Burkina Faso
18. Burundi
19. Cameroon
20. Canada
21. Chad
22. Chile
23. China
24. Colombia
25. Comoros
26. Congo-Kinshasa
27. Cuba
28. Cyprus
29. Czech Republic
30. Denmark
31. Djibouti
32. Dominican Republic
33. Egypt
34. El Salvador
35. Equatorial Guinea
36. Eritrea
37. Eswatini
38. Ethiopia
39. Finland
40. France
41. Gabon
42. Gambia
43. Georgia
44. Germany
45. Ghana
46. Greece
47. Guinea
48. Guinea-Bissau
49. Hungary
50. India
51. Indonesia
52. Iran
53. Iraq
54. Ireland
55. Italy
56. Ivory Coast
57. Japan
58. Jordan
59. Kazakhstan
60. Kenya
61. Kosovo
62. Kuwait
63. Kyrgyzstan
64. Lebanon
65. Liberia
66. Libya
67. Madagascar
68. Malaysia
69. Maldives
70. Mali
71. Malta
72. Mauritania
73. Mauritius
74. Mexico
75. Morocco
76. Mozambique
77. Myanmar
78. Nepal (Embassy)
79. Netherlands
80. New Zealand
81. Niger
82. Nigeria
83. Norway
84. Oman
85. Pakistan
86. Palestine (Embassy)
87. Panama
88. Peru
89. Philippines
90. Poland
91. Portugal
92. Qatar
93. Romania
94. Russia
95. Rwanda
96. Senegal
97. Serbia
98. Sierra Leone
99. Singapore
100. Slovakia
101. Somalia
102. South Africa
103. South Korea
104. South Sudan
105. Spain
106. Sri Lanka
107. Sudan
108. Sweden
109. Switzerland
110. Syria
111. Tajikistan
112. Tanzania
113. Thailand
114. Tunisia
115. Turkey
116. Turkmenistan
117. Uganda
118. Ukraine
119. United Arab Emirates
120. United Kingdom
121. United States
122. Uruguay
123. Uzbekistan
124. Venezuela
125. Vietnam
126. Yemen
127. Zambia
128. Zimbabwe

=== Other missions or delegations ===
1. Republic of China (Taiwan) (Economic & Cultural Office)
2. European Union (Delegation)

== Consulates-General ==
=== Dhahran ===
1. United States

=== Jeddah ===
1. Afghanistan
2. Algeria
3. Bahrain
4. Bangladesh
5. Benin
6. Brunei
7. Burkina Faso
8. Cameroon
9. Chad (Consulate)
10. China
11. Comoros
12. Djibouti
13. Egypt
14. Eritrea
15. Ethiopia
16. France
17. Gabon
18. Gambia
19. Germany
20. Ghana
21. Greece
22. Guinea
23. India
24. Indonesia
25. Iran
26. Iraq
27. Italy
28. Ivory Coast
29. Japan
30. Jordan (Consulate)
31. Kazakhstan
32. Kenya
33. Kuwait (Consulate)
34. Lebanon
35. Libya
36. Malaysia
37. Mali (Consulate)
38. Maldives
39. Mauritania (Consulate)
40. Morocco
41. Nepal
42. Niger
43. Nigeria
44. Oman
45. Pakistan
46. Palestine
47. Philippines
48. Qatar
49. Russia
50. Senegal
51. Singapore
52. Somalia
53. South Africa
54. South Korea
55. Sri Lanka
56. Sudan
57. Switzerland (Consulate)
58. Syria
59. Tanzania
60. Thailand
61. Togo
62. Tunisia
63. Turkey
64. Uganda
65. United Arab Emirates
66. United Kingdom
67. United States
68. Uzbekistan
69. Yemen

== Non-resident accredited missions ==
=== Resident in Abu Dhabi, United Arab Emirates ===
- Armenia
- Costa Rica
- Estonia
- Fiji
- Guatemala
- Lithuania
- Seychelles
- Tonga

=== Resident in Cairo, Egypt ===
- Central African Republic
- Republic of the Congo
- Croatia
- Ecuador
- Latvia
- Lesotho
- Slovenia

=== Resident in Kuwait City, Kuwait ===
- Bhutan
- Botswana
- Guyana
- Honduras
- Mongolia
- Nicaragua
- North Korea

=== Resident in New Delhi, India ===
- Cambodia
- Jamaica
- Laos
- Papua New Guinea

=== Resident in London, United Kingdom ===
- Antigua and Barbuda
- Barbados
- Iceland

=== Resident in New York City, United States ===
- Belize
- Kiribati
- Marshall Islands
- Micronesia

=== Resident elsewhere ===
- Cabo Verde (Rome, Italy)
- Haiti (Rome, Italy)
- Moldova (Ankara, Turkey)
- Saint Lucia (Brussels, Belgium)
- Samoa (Canberra, Australia)
- Solomon Islands (Jakarta, Indonesia)
- Vanuatu (Canberra, Australia)

== Embassies to open ==
Host city	Sending country	Mission	Ref.
Riyadh	Bolivia	Embassy	
Riyadh	Montenegro	Embassy	
Riyadh	North Macedonia	Embassy	
Riyadh	Paraguay	Embassy	
Riyadh	Saint Kitts and Nevis	Embassy	
Riyadh	Suriname	Embassy	
Riyadh	Togo	Embassy	

== See also ==
- List of diplomatic missions of Saudi Arabia
- Foreign relations of Saudi Arabia
