= Airborne Special Service Company =

- 高空特種勤務中隊
- Active: 1980–present
- Country: Taiwan
- Branch: Republic of China Army
- Type: Special operations force
- Part of: Army Aviation and Special Forces Command
- Garrison/HQ: Neipu, Pingtung County
- Nickname: 自強中隊、涼山特勤隊
- Motto: 尚武求勝 自強不息

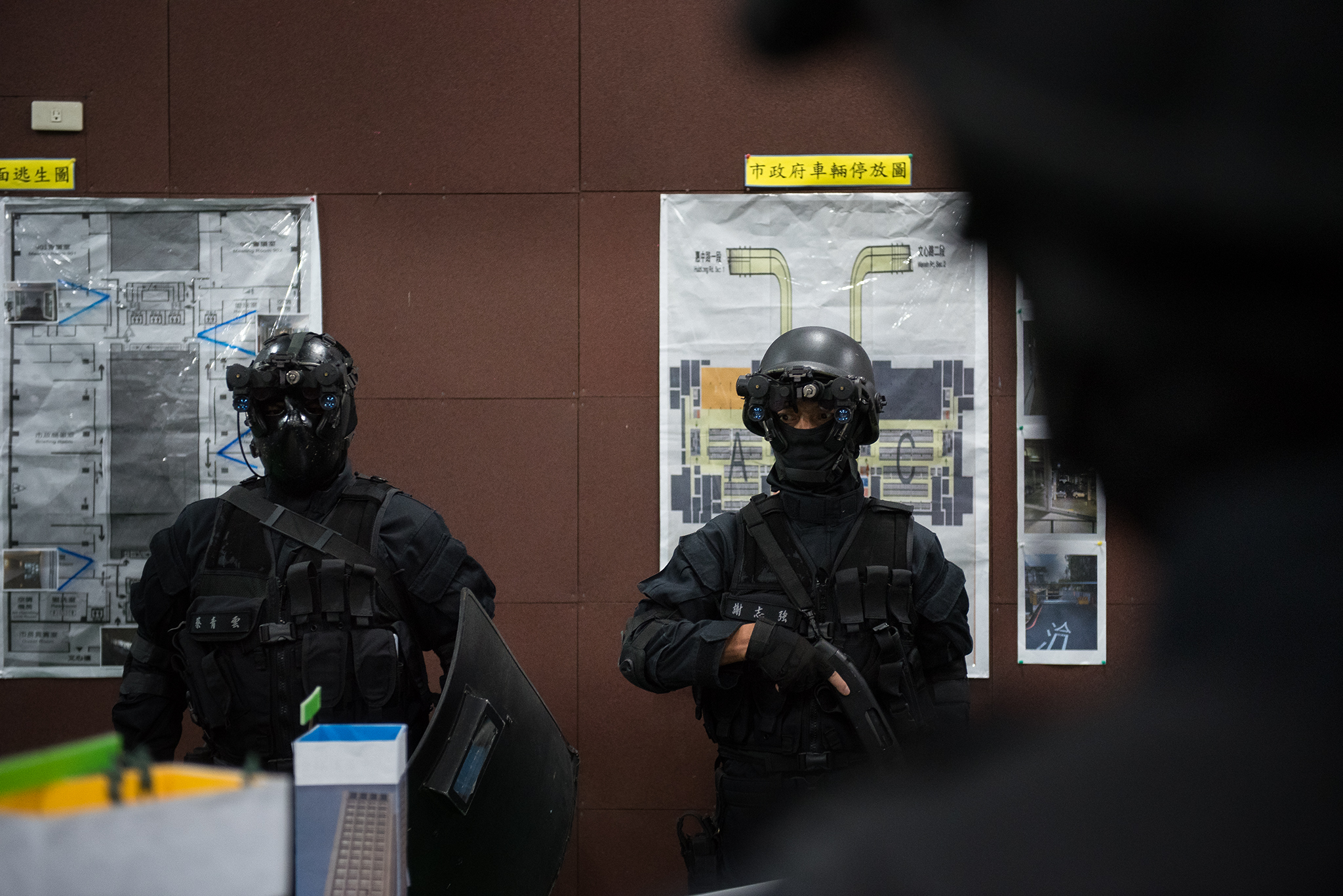
ROCA Special Force Team ASSC 2

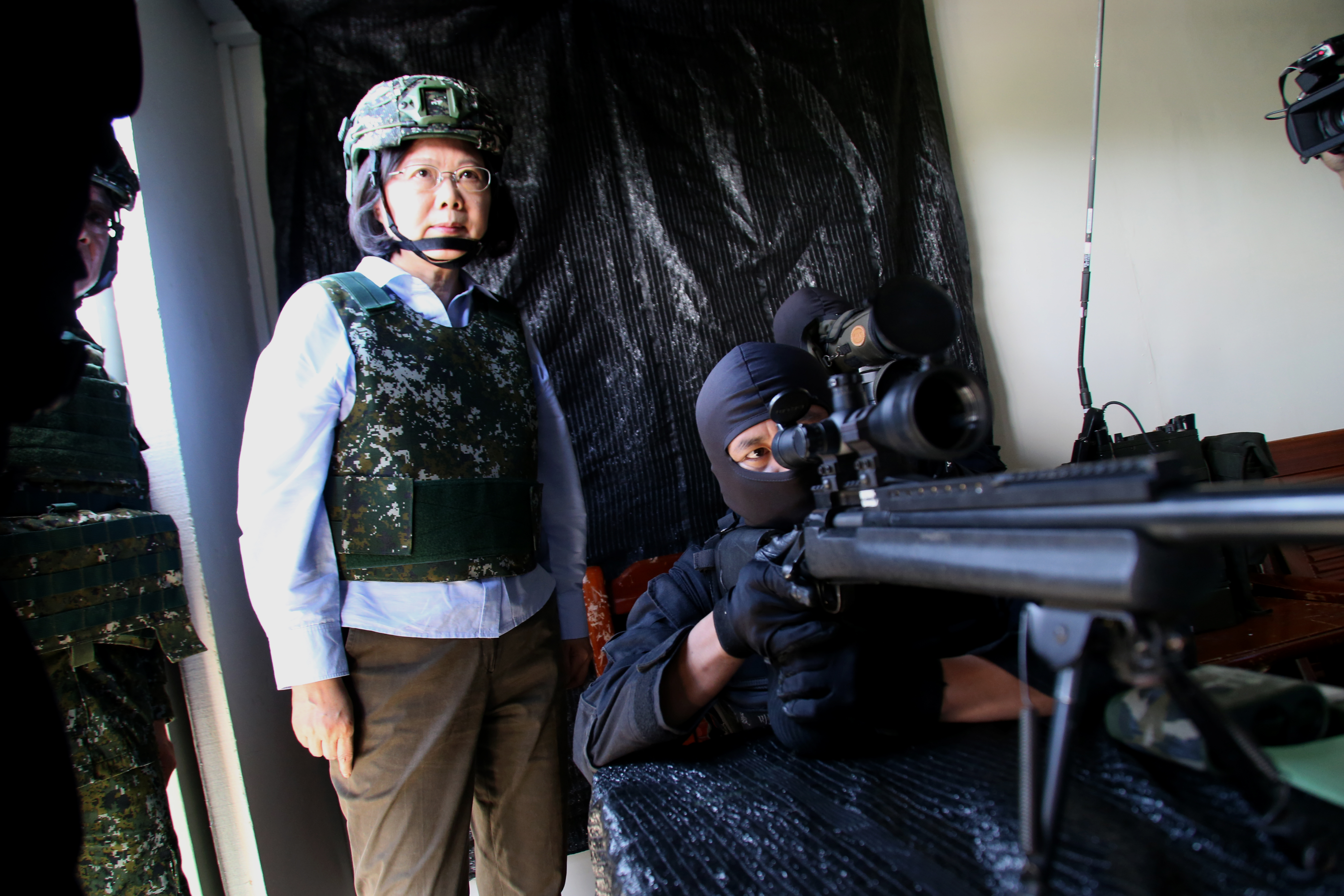
ASSC member demonstrates the T93 Sniper Rifle for President Tsai Ing-wen

The Airborne Special Service Company (ASSC; Chinese: 高空特種勤務中隊), alternatively known as the Liang Shan Special Operations Company (涼山特勤隊), is an elite special forces unit belonging to the Republic of China Army (Taiwan Army). Considered the most secretive unit in Taiwan, the ASSC is reportedly based in Taiwan Pingtung County and is tasked with carrying out special operations, including decapitation strikes in the event of a war.

It is similar to the US Army's Delta Force and the British Army's Special Air Service.

== History ==
The ASSC reportedly was founded in 1980.

== Organization ==
The ASSC is made up of 150 soldiers and is subordinate to the Army Aviation and Special Forces Command.

== See also ==
- Amphibious Reconnaissance and Patrol Unit
- Republic of China Military Police Special Services Company
- Thunder Squad
