= Saudi Arabian Trade Office, Taipei =

Saudi trade office is de facto embassy

Saudi Arabian Trade Office in Taipei المكتب التجاري العربي السعودي في تايبيه
- 沙烏地阿拉伯商務辦事處

Agency overview
- Jurisdiction: Republic of China
- Headquarters: Taipei, Taiwan
- Agency executive: Mohammed Sadi A. Alghamdi, Head of Mission
- Website: Saudi Arabian Trade Office in Taipei

The Saudi Arabian Trade Office in Taipei (Arabic: المكتب التجاري العربي السعودي في تايبيه Al-Maktab at-Tijārī al-ʻArabī as-Saʻūdī fī Taybei; Chinese: 沙烏地阿拉伯商務辦事處; pinyin: Shā Wū Dì Ālābó Shāngwù Bànshì Chù) represents the interests of Saudi Arabia in Taiwan in the absence of formal diplomatic relations, functioning as a de facto embassy.

== History ==
Until 1990, Saudi Arabia had diplomatic relations with Taiwan as the Republic of China, and had an embassy in Taipei. However, in that year, the kingdom established official diplomatic ties with the People's Republic of China and broke them off with Taiwan, although relations were continued through each side's respective representative office.

Its counterpart is the Taipei Economic and Cultural Representative Office in the Kingdom of Saudi Arabia in Riyadh. Both offices were set up in 1991, following the signing of a memorandum six months after the severing of diplomatic relations.

== See also ==
- Saudi Arabia–Taiwan relations
- List of diplomatic missions in Taiwan
- List of diplomatic missions of Saudi Arabia
