= Taipei Economic and Cultural Representative Office, Riyadh =

De facto embassy of the Republic of China (Taiwan)

Taipei Economic and Cultural Representative Office in Saudi Arabia 駐沙烏地阿拉伯台北經濟文化代表處
- Location: Riyadh, Saudi Arabia
- Ambassador: Chang, Chih-Ping (張治平)
- Jurisdiction: Saudi Arabia; Afghanistan; Pakistan; Qatar; Yemen; Sudan; South Sudan; Djibouti; Ethiopia
- Website: Taipei Economic and Cultural Representative Office in the Kingdom of Saudi Arabia

The Taipei Economic and Cultural Representative Office in the Kingdom of Saudi Arabia; (Chinese: 駐沙烏地阿拉伯王國台北經濟文化代表處; Arabic: مكتب الممثل الإقتصادي والثقافي لتايبيه في المملكة العربية السعودية, romanized: Maktab Almumaththil Al'Iiqtasadi Walththaqafi Litayibih fi Almamlakat Alearabiat Alssaeudia) represents the interests of the Republic of China (Taiwan) in Saudi Arabia in the absence of formal diplomatic relations, functioning as a de facto embassy. In addition, it has responsibility for Taiwan's relations with Afghanistan, Djibouti, Ethiopia, Pakistan, Qatar and Sudan.

The office is headed by a Taiwanese representative, currently Teng Sheng-Ping.

There was also an office in Jeddah, but it was closed in 2017 because of the diplomatic resource allocation.

== History ==
Until 1990, Taiwan had diplomatic relations with Saudi Arabia, and was represented by the Embassy of the Republic of China in Riyadh. There was also a Consulate-General of the Republic of China in Jeddah. However, in that year, Saudi Arabia recognised the People's Republic of China.

Its counterpart in Taiwan is the Saudi Arabian Trade Office in Taipei. Both offices were set up in 1991, following the signing of a secret memorandum six months after the severing of diplomatic relations.

== See also ==
- Taiwan–Saudi Arabia relations
- List of diplomatic missions of Taiwan
- List of diplomatic missions in Saudi Arabia
- Taipei Economic and Cultural Representative Office
