= China–Saudi Arabia relations =

Bilateral relations between China and Saudi Arabia

- China: Saudi Arabia

The People's Republic of China (PRC) and the Kingdom of Saudi Arabia (KSA) established official diplomatic relations on 21 July 1990.

Prior to the 1990s, bilateral relations between Saudi Arabia and the PRC did not exist. In 1975, Saudi Arabia refused to recognize the PRC as a country, despite the PRC's desire to establish relations and acceptance of Saudi Arabian policies. Since the establishment of diplomatic ties, the countries have had an increasingly warm diplomatic relationship.

China and Saudi Arabia have been increasing cooperation in the energy and financial sectors, the Belt and Road Initiative, and has signed numerous deals across several areas. King Salman and Crown Prince Mohammad bin Salman also hinted that China could boost its diplomatic footprint in the Middle East, while stating that "Saudi Arabia is willing to work hard with China to promote global and regional peace, security and prosperity". It is said that "oil is the backbone of the relationship", while Saudi Arabia has long relied on China for arms sales, including weapons the former could not acquire from anywhere.

== History ==
The Mamluk Sultan based in Cairo ordered Jidda to treat Chinese traders honorably upon their arrival in the early 15th century.

Zheng He's Treasure voyages sent some men to Mecca and Medina.

The first China-Saudi official meeting took place in Oman in November 1985, following several years of heightened contact between the two countries. According to Andrew Small, Pakistan facilitated secret military negotiations between Saudi Arabia and China in 1985. As a result, Saudi Arabia secretly purchased 50 Chinese intermediate-range ballistic missiles, due to heightened concerns about Iran during the Iran-Iraq war. As of 1989, Saudi Arabia was the only Arab country that still had not established diplomatic ties with the People's Republic of China as Saudi Arabia maintained diplomatic relations with Taiwan. After the Tiananmen Square protests of 1989 occurred in Beijing in June of that year, Saudi relations with the PRC were upgraded. Despite the event, Saudi Arabia did not provide any criticism of the Chinese government's response. In fact, in August 1989, the Saudi Arabian Foreign Ministry official presented his credentials to the PRC's foreign minister. Less than a year later on 21 July 1990, Prince Bandar bin Sultan, Saudi Arabia's ambassador to the United States, paid a visit to Beijing with an agreement to establish diplomatic relations. A few days later, diplomatic relations were established in Riyadh. At this point, Saudi Arabia ended over forty years of diplomatic ties with Taiwan.

Following the 2008 Sichuan earthquake, Saudi Arabia was the largest aid donor to China, providing close to €40,000,000 in financial assistance, and an additional €8,000,000 worth of relief materials. Chinese companies in Saudi Arabia have awarded scholarships to Saudi students allowing them to study abroad in China. The Chinese government is also offering scholarships directly to students and professionals for further training.

In 2016, China and Saudi Arabia signed a strategic partnership.

In July 2019, UN ambassadors of 37 countries, including Saudi Arabia, have signed a joint letter to the UNHRC defending China's treatment of Uyghurs and other Muslim minority groups in the Xinjiang region. In June 2020, Saudi Arabia was one of 53 countries that backed the Hong Kong national security law at the United Nations.

In December 2022, General Secretary of the Chinese Communist Party Xi Jinping and his administration intensified relations with Saudi Arabia to improve its energy access as a result of global uncertainties.

On 10 March 2023, Saudi Arabia and Iran agreed to restore diplomatic ties cut in 2016 after a deal brokered between the two countries by China following secret talks in Beijing.

A 2025 academic review highlights that China's diplomatic approach to Saudi Arabia is emblematic of its broader strategy in the Middle East—favoring ambiguity, adaptability, and infrastructure-driven influence over military commitments. The review emphasizes China's ability to maintain close ties with Riyadh while avoiding regional entanglements, characterizing the relationship as transactional and pragmatic. According to the review, this mode of engagement enables China to expand its presence through selective diplomacy and energy cooperation while preserving its image as a neutral actor.

== Bilateral visits ==
The first diplomatic visit between Saudi Arabia and the People's Republic of China occurred in 1999, when the CCP general secretary Jiang Zemin visited Riyadh, which resulted in the mutual signing of the 1999 Strategic Oil Cooperation agreement. The agreement stipulated that the PRC would open its oil refinery sector to Saudi Arabia if Saudi Arabia would allow for exploration and development opportunities for Chinese investors. While the agreement acted as a starting point for bilateral relations, the results of the agreement were small, as China was not able to use most of the sour crude oil provided by Saudi Arabia's new reserves in Chinese refining facilities.

China-Saudi diplomatic and economic relations grew closer in the 2000s. In 2004, the People's Republic of China and Saudi Arabia initiated a series of regular political meetings. During the same year, Sinopec, China's state-run oil company, signed an agreement to explore gas in the Empty Quarter (Rub' al Khali) in Saudi Arabia. Then, in December 2005, the People's Republic of China and the Organization of Petroleum Exporting Countries (OPEC) held their first set of formal talks.

In January 2006, King Abdullah visited China as his first foreign visit after being enthroned. While in China, King Abdullah signed five major agreements on energy cooperation. The visit was also used as a way to discuss broader economic trade, taxation and technical accords, a vocational training agreement, as well as to finalize an urban development loan for the Saudi Arabian Development Bank in China's Xinjiang province. CCP general secretary Hu Jintao exclaimed that this bilateral cooperation would "write a new chapter of friendly cooperation between China and Saudi Arabia in the new century." His visit was reciprocated by Chinese leader Hu Jintao later that year. Hu Jintao was only the second foreign leader in history who was granted permission to address Saudi Arabia's legislative council. During this time, the two leaders supposedly signed several agreements regarding further energy exploration and security collaboration. It is said that Saudi Arabia views economic ties with the PRC in a favorable light because they come with "no strings attached" and focus on economic issues rather than political ones. His only mention of non-economical related affairs was, "war and military force is never a permanent solution to a problem," advising to "persist with a just and fair handling of conflicts and bridging of differences through political means." He did not touch upon democracy or human rights.

In February 2009, Hu visited Saudi Arabia a second time, to "exchange views on international and regional issues of common concern" with King Abdullah.

In February 2019, the Saudi Crown Prince, Mohammad bin Salman, made a visit to China where he met the Chinese leader and a number of high officials. Along with CCP general secretary Xi Jinping, the crown prince met Chinese premier Li Keqiang, minister of foreign affairs Wang Yi and others where they agreed in boosting the already-strong commercial ties between the two parties. As both the parties have their own long-run strategic plan, China's Belt and Road and Saudi's Vision 2030, they both expressed willingness to collaborate in the implementation of the said strategies. The two parties signed a cooperation agreement to enhance researches and studies in the maritime transport industry. The Saudi crown prince agreed to allocate $10 billion to establish a refining and petrochemical complex in China. Other cooperation agreements signed during the visit including economic sectors such as renewable energy and AI. Mohammad bin Salman also expressed Saudi Arabia's support for China's "right to take anti-terrorism and deradialisation measures to safeguard national security". In the sideline of the visit, the Saudi Crown Prince announced Saudi Arabia's willingness to teach the Chinese language in the Saudi's schools and universities.

Between 7 and 10 December 2022, Chinese leader Xi Jinping visited Riyadh, Saudi Arabia, where he met king Salman, and crown prince and prime minister Mohammed bin Salman. He also met with numerous Arab leaders, including members of the Gulf Cooperation Council. During the meeting, he signed numerous commercial deals with Saudi Arabia and formally elevated the relationship to comprehensive strategic partnership, highest level in China's formal ranking of relations with other countries.

== Trade and investment ==
Countries which signed cooperation documents related to the Belt and Road Initiative

China-Saudi trade has increased significantly since 2000. In 2005 alone, trade increased 59%, allowing Saudi Arabia to overtake Angola as China's largest source of oil for the first time. After claiming the throne in 2005, King Abdullah adopted a pro-Asian, "look east" trade policy, with more than half of Saudi oil going to Asia. Saudi-owned Saudi Basic Industries Corporation (SABIC) alone exports over $2 billion in petrochemicals to China on a yearly basis. In 2008, China-Saudi bilateral trade was worth €32,500,000,000, making Saudi Arabia China's largest trading partner in Western Asia. In the first quarter of 2010, Saudi oil export to China has reached over 1 million barrels, exceeding exports to the United States. With the huge increase in China-Saudi trade, Saudi Arabia has emerged as a significant investor in the PRC. Saudis are eager to invest in Chinese oil-industry related projects as a way to secure their status as a major oil provider to China. For example, in 2004, Saudi Arabia's Saudi Aramco Overseas Company invested nearly 1/3 of the $3 billion in funds needed for the construction of a petrochemical facility in China's southeastern Fujian Province, which is planned to process 8 million tons of Saudi crude oil. Upon completion of this project, the refinery would be able to refine triple its capacity and have the ability to process the Saudi "distressed" crude oil that otherwise could not be refined in China. Further, in 2006, the PRC and Saudi Arabia agreed to jointly construct an oil storage facility on China's Hainan Island and Saudi Arabia invited Chinese firms to participate in infrastructure development worth $624 billion. On April 6, 2012, SABIC announced a new investment plan of $100 million to set up a new technology center in the Kangqiao area of Shanghai. Three days earlier on April 3, SABIC launched the second phase of construction projects for petrochemical plants in the cities of Tianjin and Chongqing, which were part of the US$11 billion project with the state-run Sinopec Group to continue boosting output at polycarbonate production complexes. Besides oil-related companies, other major Saudi companies - such as the Saudi Arabian General Investment Authority (SAGIA) and Saudi Arabian Airlines have established offices in China. In 2006, Saudi Arabia invested $1.1 billion in China, the first significant investment since 2000. Likewise, in 2006, China's largest aluminum producer - Aluminum of China (Chalco) partnered with Saudi companies to build a $3 billion aluminum facility in Saudi Arabia. In 2009, China Railway Company won a $1.8 billion bid to build a monorail in Mecca as a way to help transport pilgrims.

In May 2019, China's import of Saudi crude oil has increased by 43%. This has made Saudi Arabia the top supplier to China. Saudi Arabia is China's largest trading partner in the Gulf, largely because of the amount of oil China imports from it.

In 2024, Saudi Arabia sought to enhance cooperation with Chinese companies in the automotive and automation sectors during a tour of East Asia led by Bandar Alkhorayef. The delegation visited Guangzhou, Hong Kong, and Singapore to strengthen relations and explore joint venture opportunities. Key meetings included discussions with major companies like GAC Group, General Lithium, and Huawei.

During a 2016 visit to China, Mohammed bin Salman described the Belt and Road Initiative (BRI) as key pillar of Saudi Arabia's Vision 2030 development plan. Saudi Arabia joined the BRI in 2018. China's Belt and Road Initiative (BRI) cooperation with Saudi Arabia also includes a focus on renewable energy, consistent with Saudi national priorities of reducing oil dependence.

== Military ==
While official diplomatic relations between Saudi Arabia and China were not established until the 1990s, defense relations began beforehand in the 1980s. When the United States refused to sell Saudi Arabia long-range fuel tanks for Saudi F-15 fighters, Prince Khalid bin Sultan traveled to China to purchase ballistic missiles. Saudi Arabia arranged a deal with China in 1988 to obtain between fifty and sixty nuclear-payload-capable CSS-2 intermediate-range ballistic missiles. Thomas Woodrow commented: "The Chinese in essence hoodwinked the Saudis into buying an antique missile system worthless without its nuclear warhead." After this interaction, there is no more documented evidence of similar transactions. Some think China-Saudi strategic military cooperation has continued to grow. Others believe China has based more than one thousand of its military advisers at Saudi missile installations. Press reports indicate that China has offered Saudi Arabia the opportunity to purchase modern missile systems. (i.e. 373-mile range CSS-6, 1,118-mile range CSS-5 solid-fueled missiles, 3,418-mile range CSS-2 intercontinental ballistic missile.) China is one of the few countries supplying this type of technology and as such is capable of demanding a cash transaction. Saudi Arabia publicly displayed them for the first time in 2014.

In January 2014, Newsweek revealed that Saudi Arabia had secretly bought a number of CSS-5 medium-range ballistic missiles in 2007. They also said that the American CIA had allowed the deal to go through as long as the missiles were modified to not be able to carry nuclear warheads. After the Gulf War, the Saudis and the CIA worked together to covertly allow the purchase of Chinese CSS-5s. The CSS-5 is solid-fueled instead of liquid-fueled like the CSS-2, so it takes less time to prepare for launch. It is accurate to 30 meters CEP, allowing it to attack specific targets like compounds or palaces. The Saudis are not known to possess mobile launchers, but may use the same 12 launchers originally bought with the CSS-2s. The number of CSS-5 missiles that were bought is unknown. Newsweek speculates that details of the deal being made public is part of Saudi deterrence against Iran. Saudi significantly escalated its ballistic missile program with help from China according to US intel.

Saudi used the Chinese-made PLZ-45 howitzers and CAIG Wing Loong drones to bomb Houthi rebels during the Military Intervention in Yemen. A license to produce Chinese-made CASC Rainbow (CH) drones was granted to Saudi Arabia in 2017. China and Saudi held first joint naval drills in 2019.

In 2021, CNN reported that satellite images indicated that Saudi Arabia was, with Chinese assistance, manufacturing solid fueled missiles of an undetermined type. In March 2022, Saudi Arabia's Advanced Communications and Electronics Systems Co (ACES) signed a deal with China Electronics Technology group to manufacture unmanned aerial vehicle (UAV payload systems).

== Nuclear cooperation ==
On January 15, 2012, China and Saudi Arabia signed a deal signifying increased nuclear cooperation. According to Saudi Arabia, the goal is "to enhance cooperation between the two countries in the development and use of atomic energy for peaceful purposes." The deal sets the stage for strengthened scientific, technological, and economic cooperation between the People's Republic of China and Saudi Arabia, focusing on areas such as maintenance and development of nuclear power plants and research reactors, as well as the supply of nuclear fuel components. This agreement is Saudi Arabia's fourth nuclear agreement, following such deals with France, Argentina and South Korea. The agreement was signed at the end of Chinese Premier Wen Jiabao's first trip to Saudi Arabia as part of a six-day tour to the Middle East. Saudi expanded its nuclear programme with help from China according to US intel.

== Resident diplomatic missions ==
- China has an embassy in Riyadh and a consulate-general in Jeddah.
- Saudi Arabia has an embassy in Beijing and consulates-general in Guangzhou and Hong Kong.

== See also ==
- Foreign relations of China
- Foreign relations of Saudi Arabia
- Saudi Arabia–Taiwan relations
