= List of diplomatic missions of Saudi Arabia =

This is a list of diplomatic missions of Saudi Arabia. Ibn Saud established the General Directory for the Foreign Affairs in 1926. Four years later it was given ministry status, even though it had a staff of fifteen employees in total and no diplomatic missions abroad. In 1936, Saudi Arabia had five missions–in London, Baghdad, Damascus, Geneva, and Cairo–and fifteen years later this number jumped to sixteen. Saudi Arabia now has an extensive diplomatic presence worldwide.

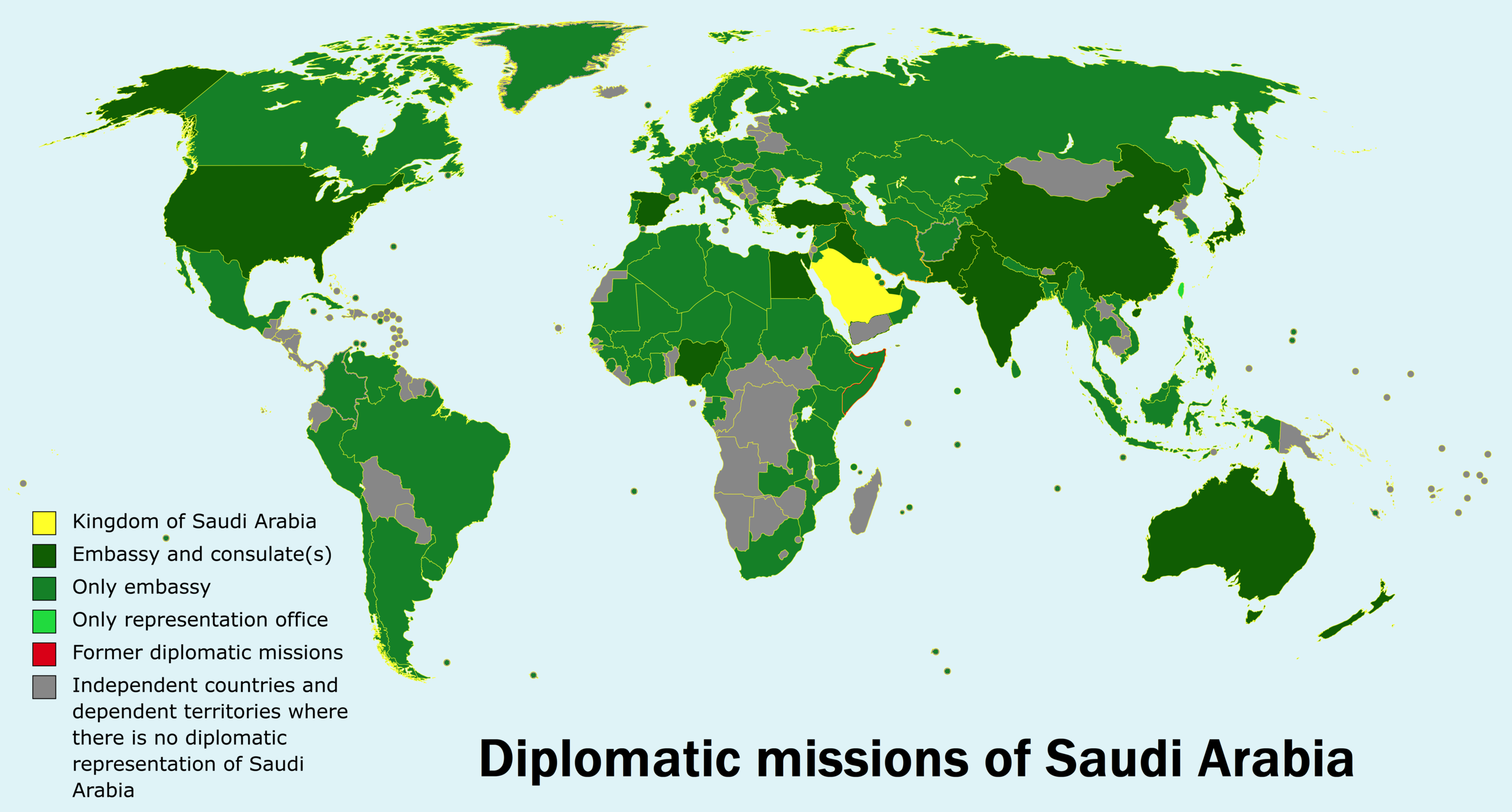
Map showing Saudi diplomatic missions

== Africa ==
Host country	Host city	Mission	Concurrent accreditation	Ref.
Algeria	Algiers	Embassy		
Burkina Faso	Ouagadougou	Embassy		
Cameroon	Yaoundé	Embassy		
Chad	N'Djamena	Embassy	Countries: Central African Republic	
Comoros	Moroni	Embassy		
Djibouti	Djibouti City	Embassy		
Egypt	Cairo	Embassy		
Egypt	Alexandria	Consulate-General		
Egypt	Suez	Consulate-General		
Eritrea	Asmara	Embassy		
Ethiopia	Addis Ababa	Embassy		
Gabon	Libreville	Embassy	Countries: Congo-Brazzaville; Equatorial Guinea; Sao Tome and Principe	
Ghana	Accra	Embassy	Countries: Togo	
Guinea	Conakry	Embassy		
Ivory Coast	Abidjan	Embassy	Countries: Liberia	
Kenya	Nairobi	Embassy	Countries: Malawi; Seychelles	
Libya	Tripoli	Embassy		
Mali	Bamako	Embassy		
Mauritania	Nouakchott	Embassy		
Mauritius	Port Louis	Embassy		
Morocco	Rabat	Embassy		
Mozambique	Maputo	Embassy		
Niger	Niamey	Embassy		
Nigeria	Abuja	Embassy	Countries: Benin	
Nigeria	Kano	Consulate-General		
Senegal	Dakar	Embassy	Countries: Cabo Verde; Gambia; Guinea-Bissau	
Sierra Leone	Freetown	Embassy		
Somalia	Mogadishu	Embassy		
South Africa	Pretoria	Embassy	Countries: Botswana; Eswatini; Lesotho	
Sudan	Port Sudan	Embassy		
Tanzania	Dar es Salaam	Embassy	Countries: Burundi; Madagascar	
Tunisia	Tunis	Embassy		
Uganda	Kampala	Embassy	Countries: Rwanda; South Sudan	
Zambia	Lusaka	Embassy	Countries: Angola; Namibia; Zimbabwe	

== Americas ==
Host country	Host city	Mission	Concurrent accreditation	Ref.
Argentina	Buenos Aires	Embassy	Countries: Paraguay	
Brazil	Brasília	Embassy	Countries: Bolivia; Ecuador; Guyana; Suriname	
Canada	Ottawa	Embassy		
Chile	Santiago de Chile	Embassy		
Colombia	Bogotá	Embassy		
Cuba	Havana	Embassy	Countries: Bahamas; Dominican Republic; Haiti; Jamaica	
Mexico	Mexico City	Embassy	Countries: Belize; El Salvador; Guatemala; Honduras; Nicaragua	
Peru	Lima	Embassy	Countries: Costa Rica; Panama	
United States	Washington, D.C.	Embassy		
United States	Houston	Consulate-General		
United States	Los Angeles	Consulate-General		
United States	New York City	Consulate-General		
Uruguay	Montevideo	Embassy		
Venezuela	Caracas	Embassy	Countries: Antigua and Barbuda; Barbados; Dominica; Grenada; Saint Lucia; Saint Vincent and the Grenadines; Trinidad and Tobago	

== Asia ==
Host country	Host city	Mission	Concurrent accreditation	Ref.
Afghanistan	Kabul	Embassy		
Azerbaijan	Baku	Embassy		
Bahrain	Manama	Embassy		
Bangladesh	Dhaka	Embassy		
Brunei	Bandar Seri Begawan	Embassy		
China	Beijing	Embassy	Countries: Mongolia	
China	Guangzhou	Consulate-General		
China	Hong Kong	Consulate-General		
Georgia	Tbilisi	Embassy	Countries: Armenia	
India	New Delhi	Embassy	Countries: Bhutan; Laos	
India	Mumbai	Consulate-General		
Indonesia	Jakarta	Embassy	Countries: Timor-Leste	
Iran	Tehran	Embassy		
Iran	Mashhad	Consulate-General		
Iraq	Baghdad	Embassy		
Iraq	Basra	Consulate-General		
Iraq	Erbil	Consulate-General		
Japan	Tokyo	Embassy		
Jordan	Amman	Embassy	Countries: Palestine	
Kazakhstan	Astana	Embassy		
Kuwait	Kuwait City	Embassy		
Kyrgyzstan	Bishkek	Embassy		
Lebanon	Beirut	Embassy		
Malaysia	Kuala Lumpur	Embassy		
Maldives	Malé	Embassy		
Myanmar	Yangon	Embassy		
Nepal	Kathmandu	Embassy		
Oman	Muscat	Embassy		
Pakistan	Islamabad	Embassy		
Pakistan	Karachi	Consulate-General		
Philippines	Manila	Embassy		
Qatar	Doha	Embassy		
Singapore	Singapore	Embassy		
South Korea	Seoul	Embassy		
Sri Lanka	Colombo	Embassy		
Syria	Damascus	Embassy		
Taiwan	Taipei	Trade office		
Tajikistan	Dushanbe	Embassy		
Thailand	Bangkok	Embassy		
Turkey	Ankara	Embassy		
Turkey	Istanbul	Consulate-General		
Turkmenistan	Ashgabat	Embassy		
United Arab Emirates	Abu Dhabi	Embassy		
United Arab Emirates	Dubai	Consulate-General		
Uzbekistan	Tashkent	Embassy		
Vietnam	Hanoi	Embassy	Countries: Cambodia	

== Europe ==
Host country	Host city	Mission	Concurrent accreditation	Ref.
Albania	Tirana	Embassy	Countries: Kosovo; North Macedonia	
Austria	Vienna	Embassy	Countries: Slovakia	
Belgium	Brussels	Embassy	Countries: Luxembourg	
Bosnia and Herzegovina	Sarajevo	Embassy		
Bulgaria	Sofia	Embassy		
Cyprus	Nicosia	Embassy		
Czechia	Prague	Embassy		
Denmark	Copenhagen	Embassy	Countries: Lithuania	
Finland	Helsinki	Embassy	Countries: Estonia	
France	Paris	Embassy	Countries: Monaco	
Germany	Berlin	Embassy		
Germany	Frankfurt	Consulate-General		
Greece	Athens	Embassy		
Hungary	Budapest	Embassy	Countries: Serbia; Slovenia	
Ireland	Dublin	Embassy		
Italy	Rome	Embassy	Countries: Malta; San Marino	
Netherlands	The Hague	Embassy		
Norway	Oslo	Embassy		
Poland	Warsaw	Embassy		
Portugal	Lisbon	Embassy		
Romania	Bucharest	Embassy	Countries: Moldova	
Russia	Moscow	Embassy	Countries: Belarus	
Spain	Madrid	Embassy	Countries: Andorra	
Spain	Málaga	Consulate		
Sweden	Stockholm	Embassy	Countries: Iceland; Latvia	
Switzerland	Bern	Embassy	Countries: Liechtenstein	
Switzerland	Geneva	Consulate		
Ukraine	Kyiv	Embassy		
United Kingdom	London	Embassy		

== Oceania ==
Host country	Host city	Mission	Concurrent accreditation	Ref.
Australia	Canberra	Embassy	Countries: Fiji; Kiribati; Nauru; Papua New Guinea; Solomon Islands; Vanuatu	
Australia	Sydney	Consulate-General		
New Zealand	Wellington	Embassy	Countries: Cook Islands; Niue; Samoa; Tonga; Tuvalu	
New Zealand	Auckland	Consulate-General		

== Multilateral organizations ==
Organization	Host city	Mission	Ref.
European Union	Brussels	Mission	
United Nations	New York City	Permanent Mission	
United Nations	Geneva	Permanent Mission	
UNESCO	Paris	Permanent Mission	
Arab League	Cairo	Mission	
OPEC	Vienna	Mission	

== Gallery ==
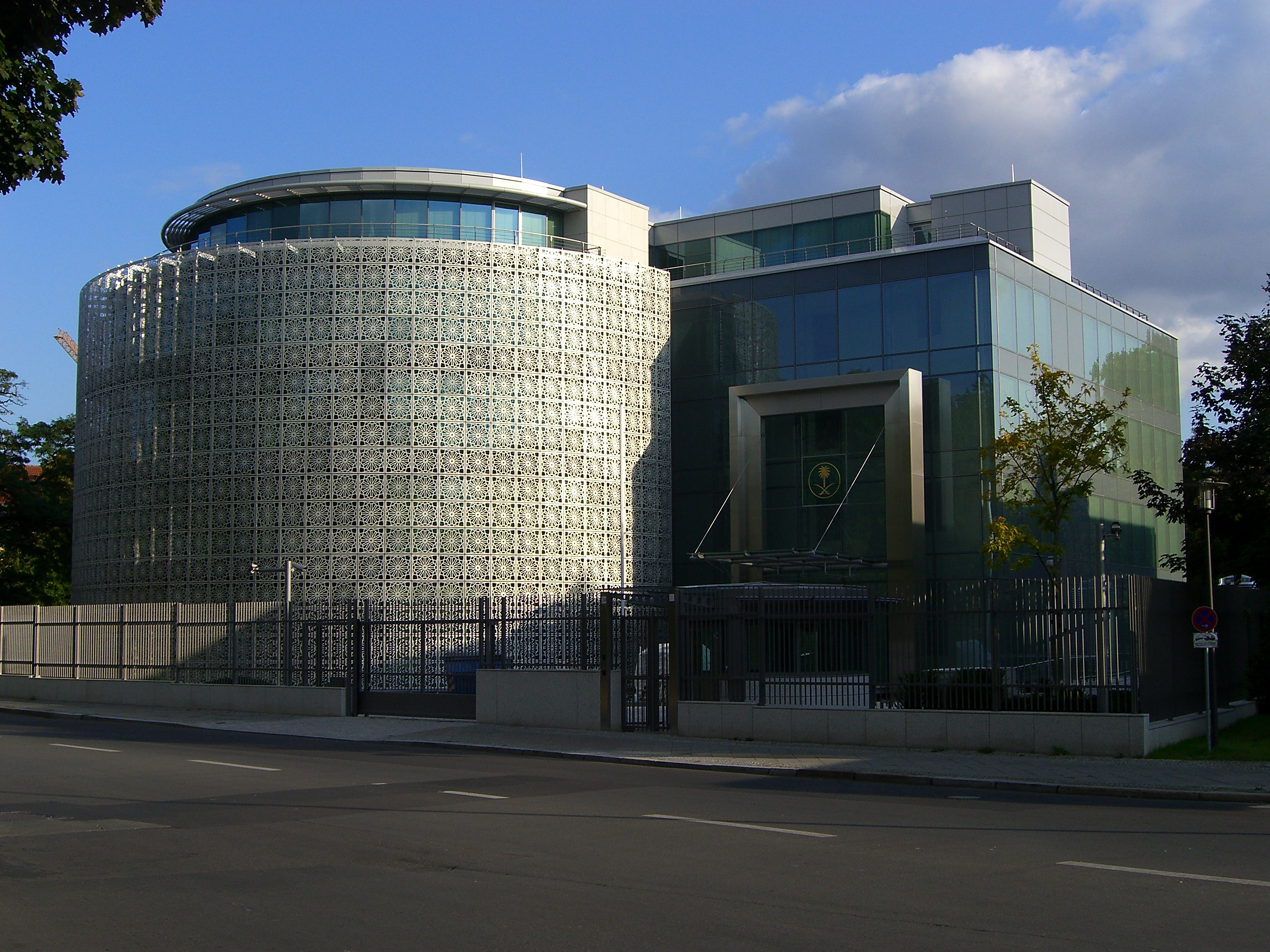
Embassy in Berlin

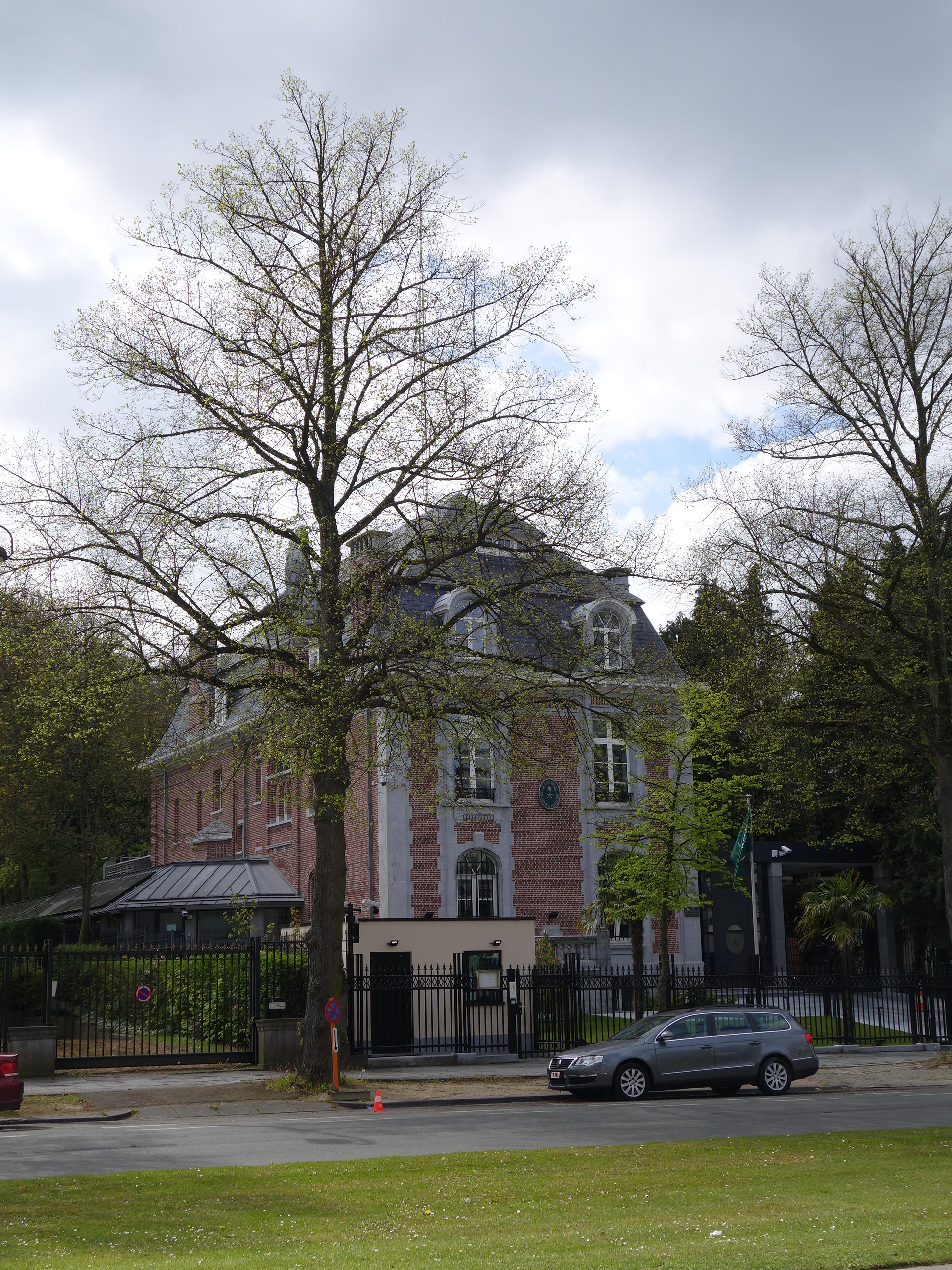
Embassy in Brussels

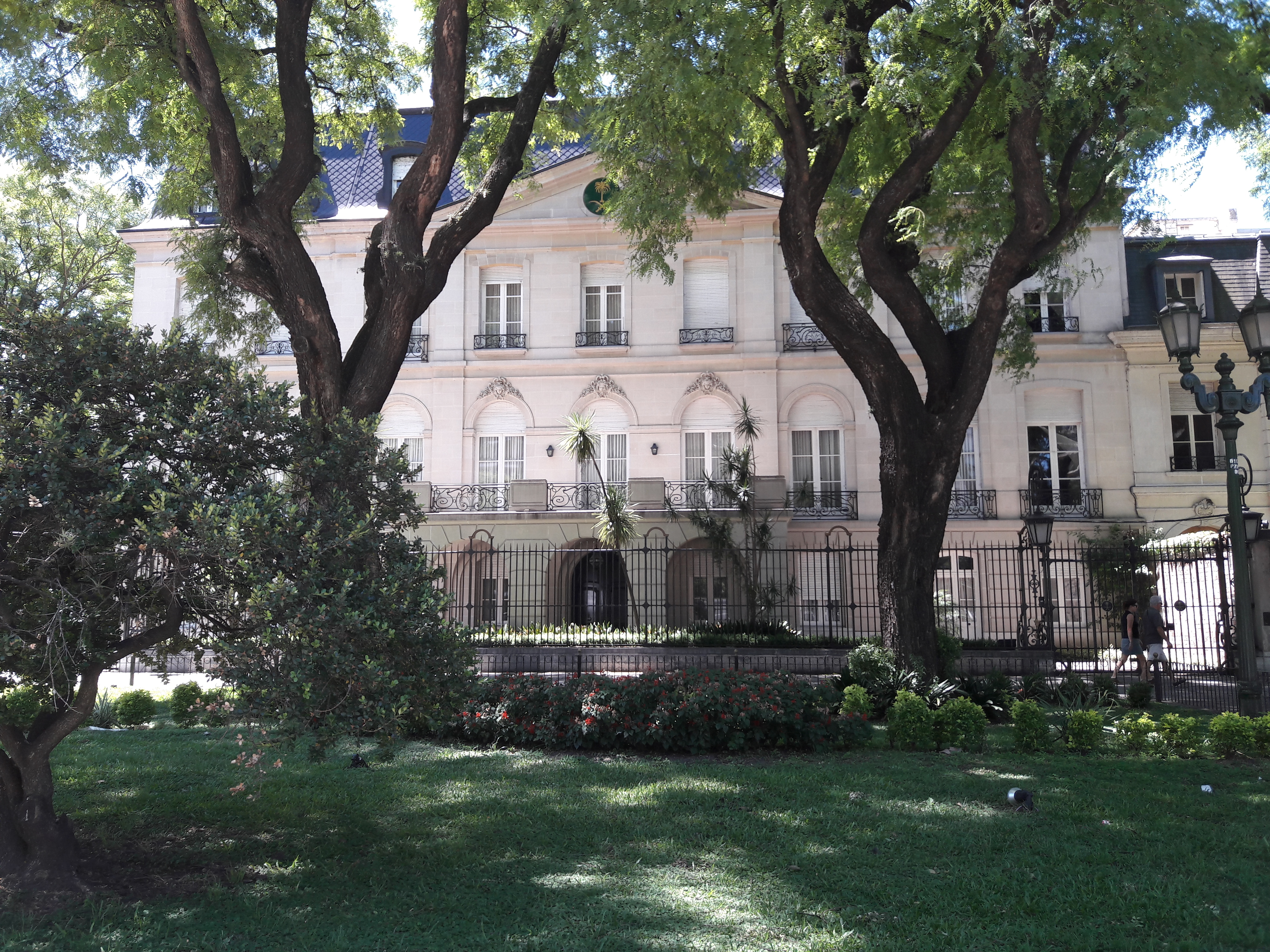
Embassy in Buenos Aires

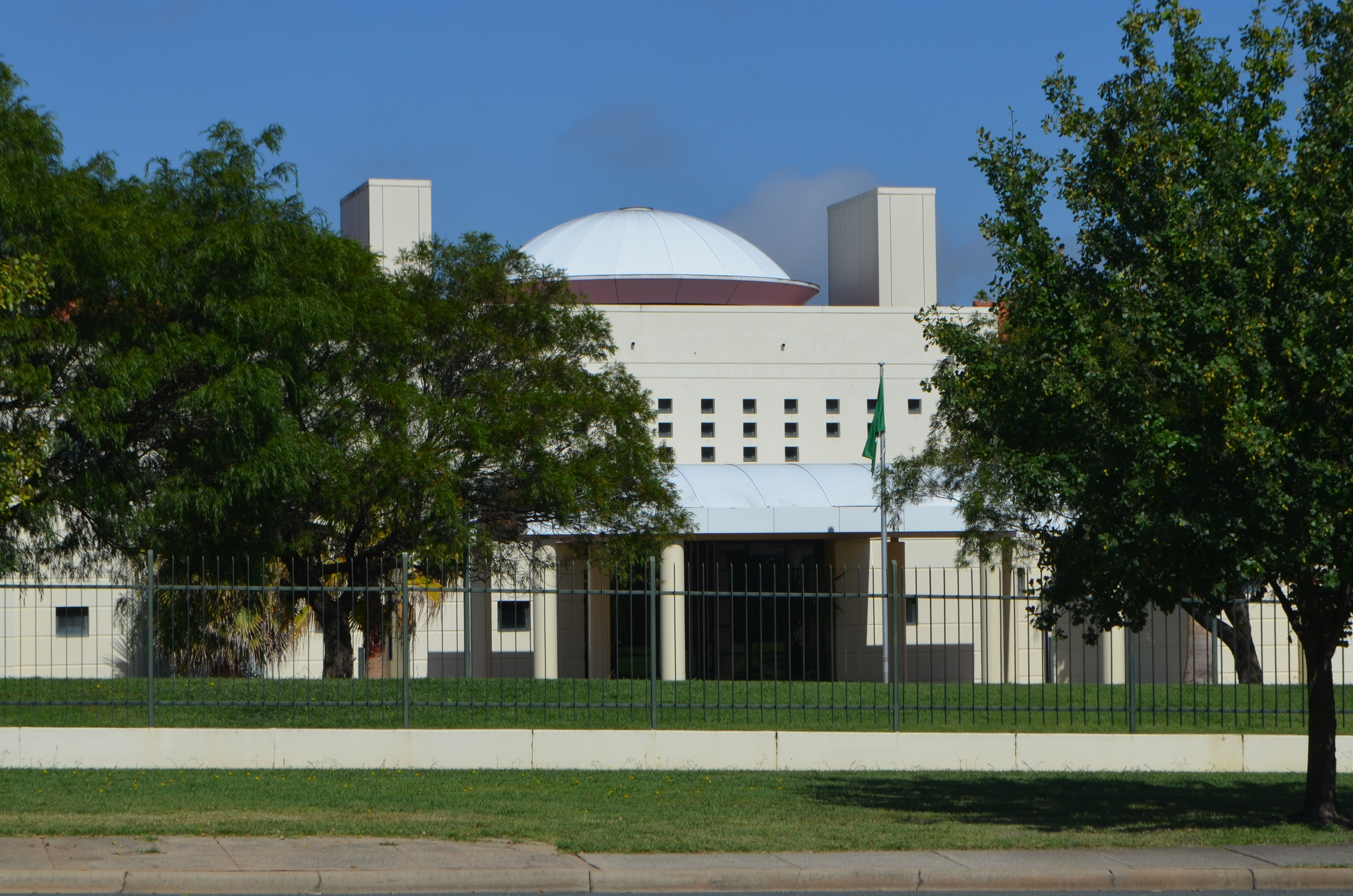
Embassy in Canberra

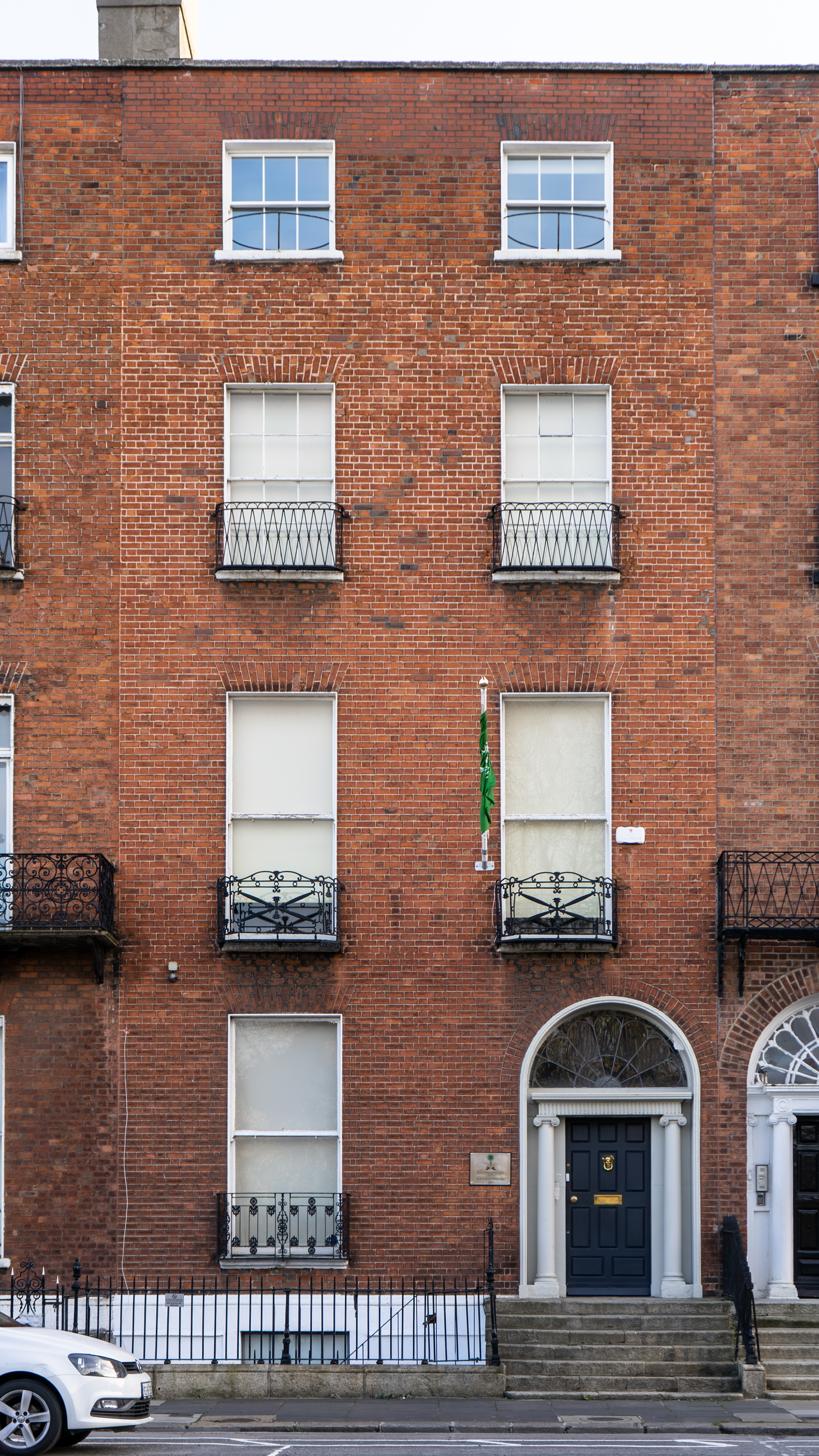
Embassy in Dublin

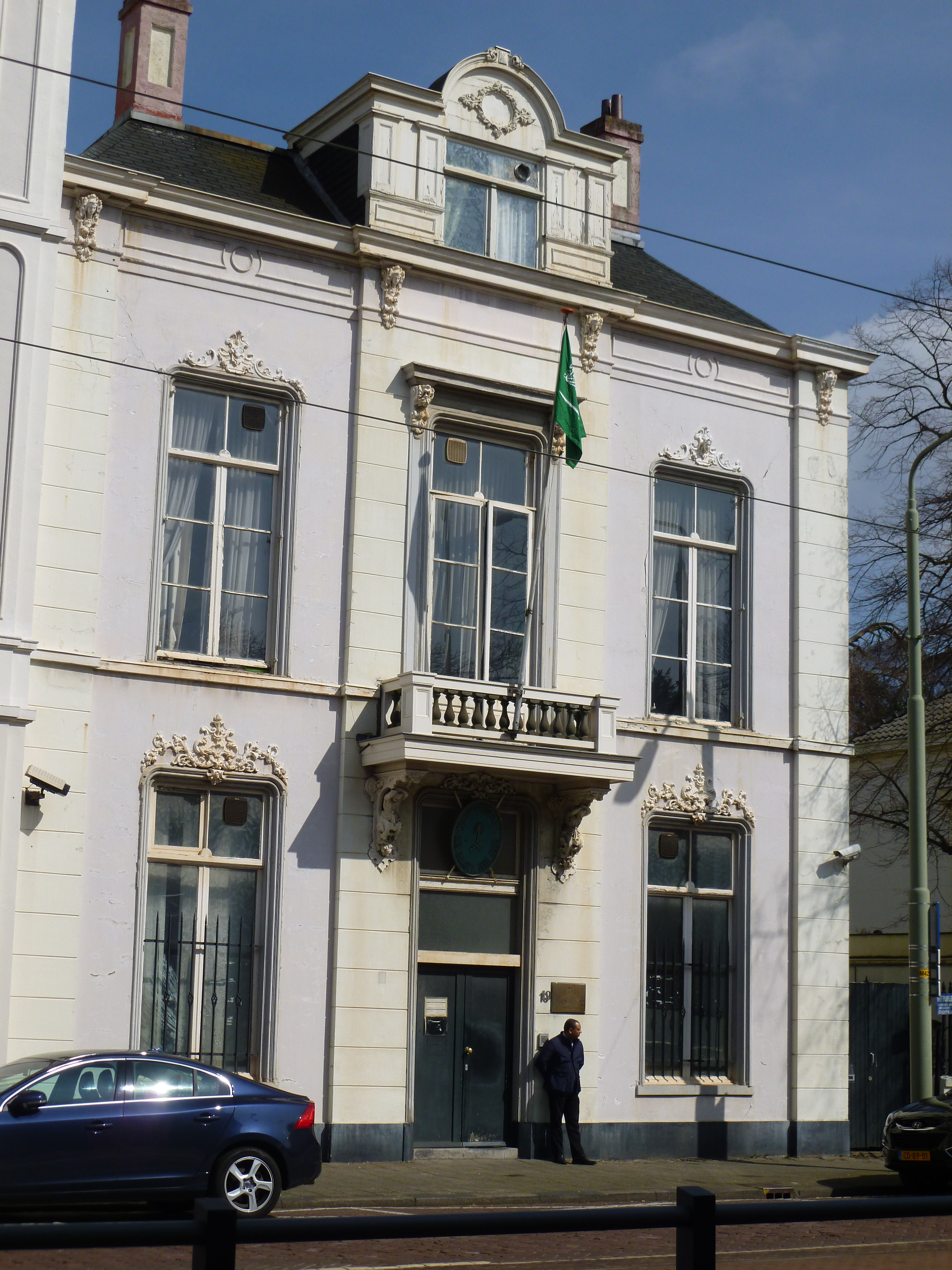
Embassy in The Hague

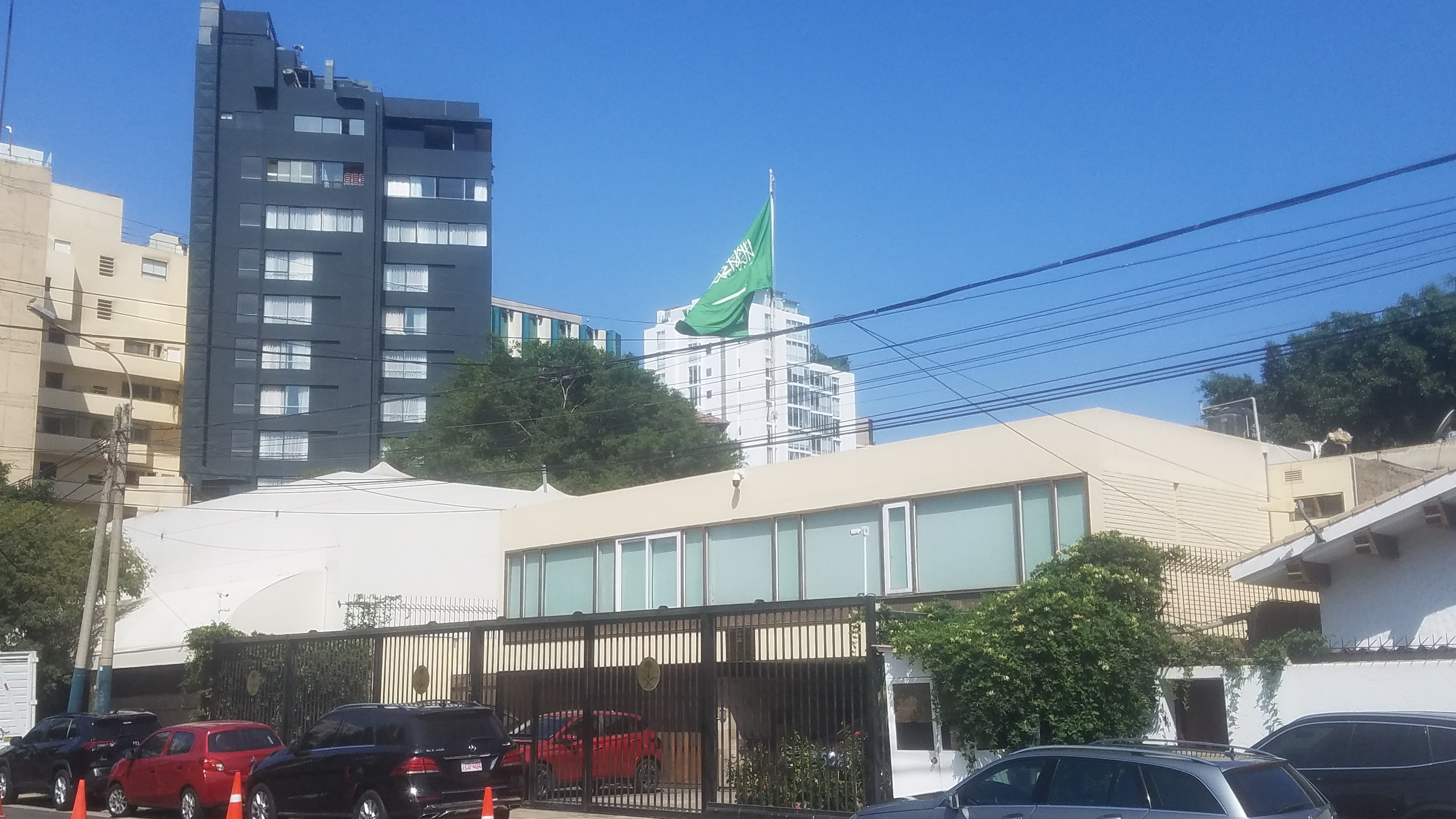
Embassy in Lima

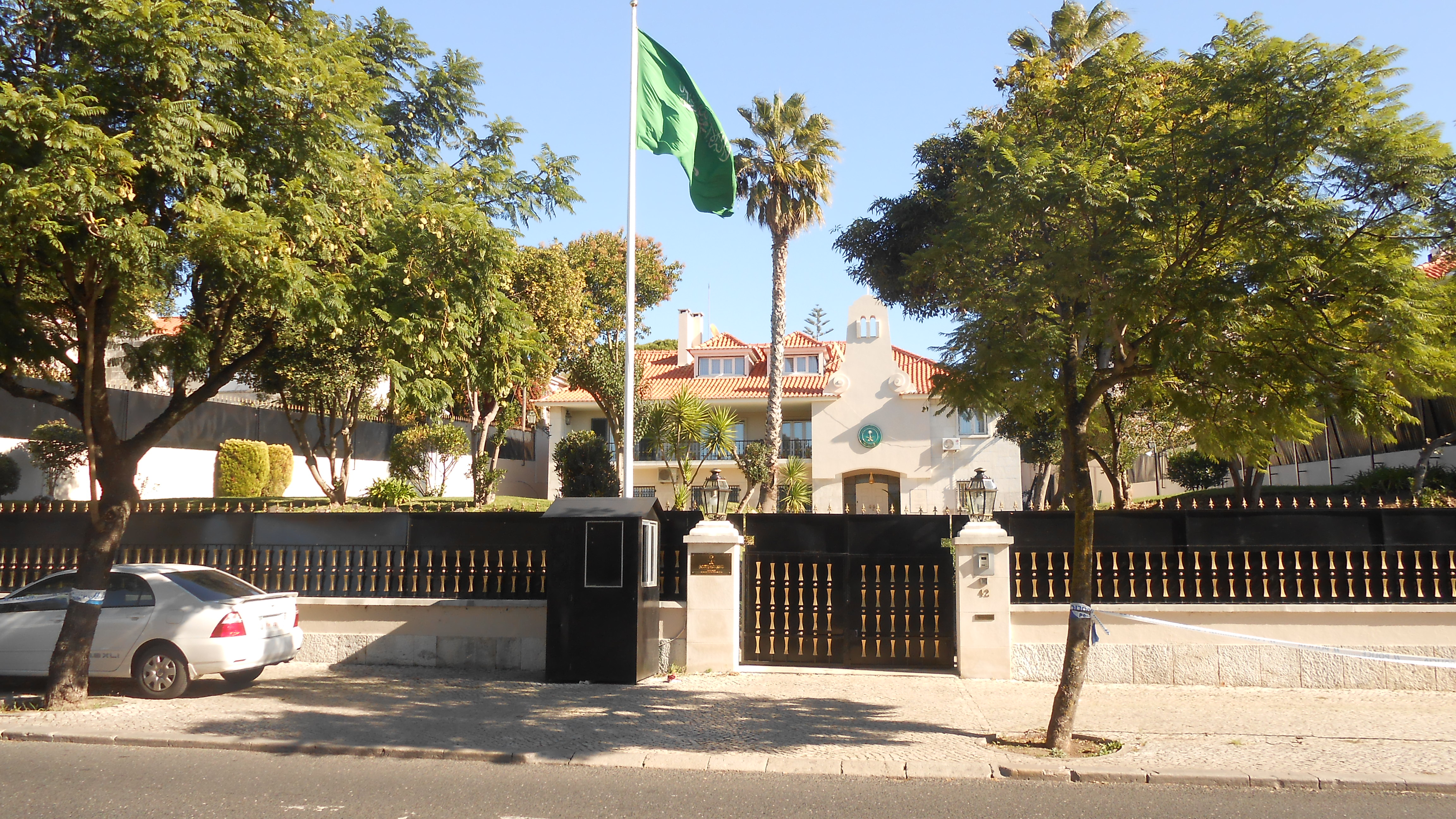
Embassy in Lisbon

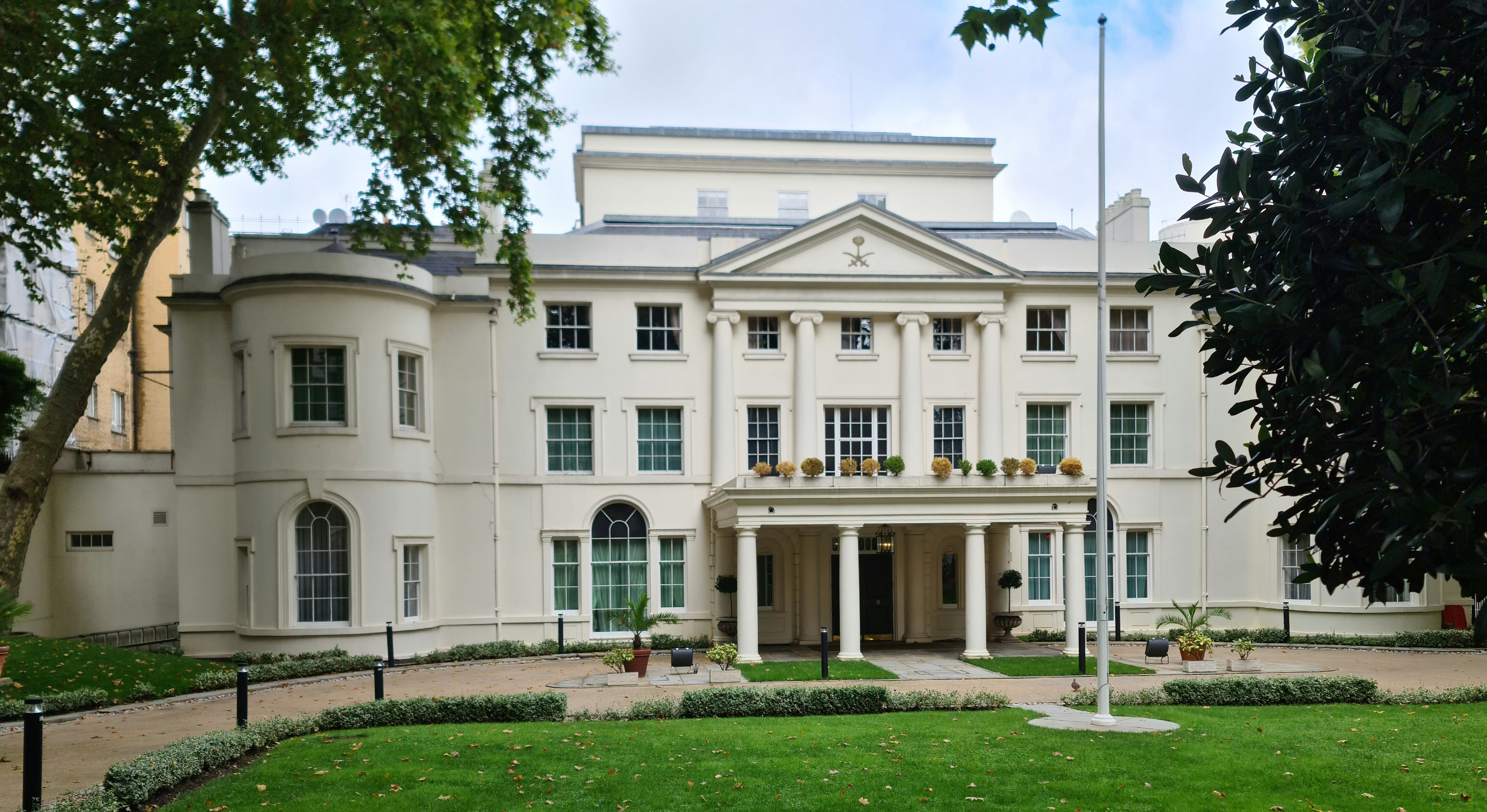
Embassy in London

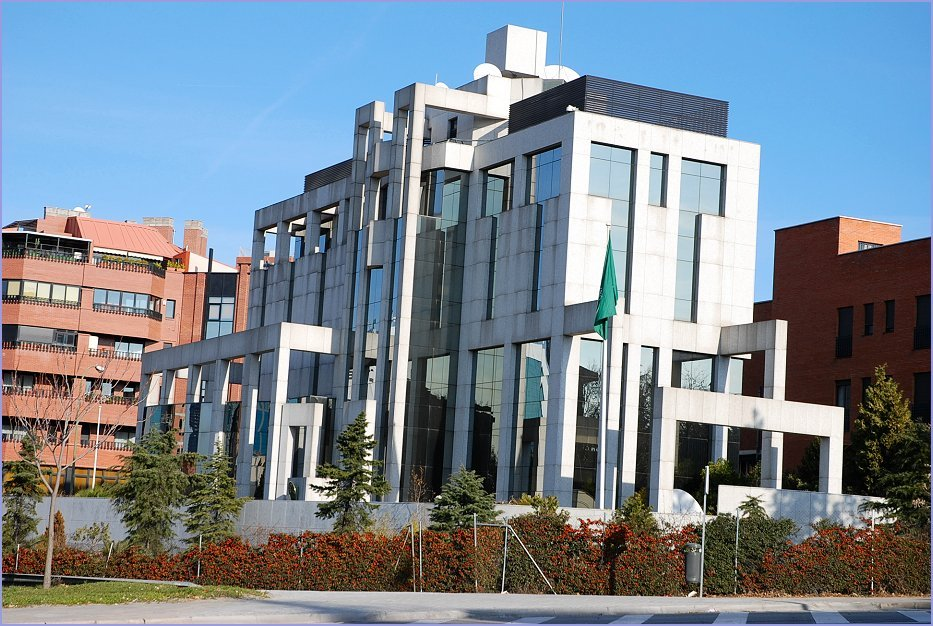
Embassy in Madrid

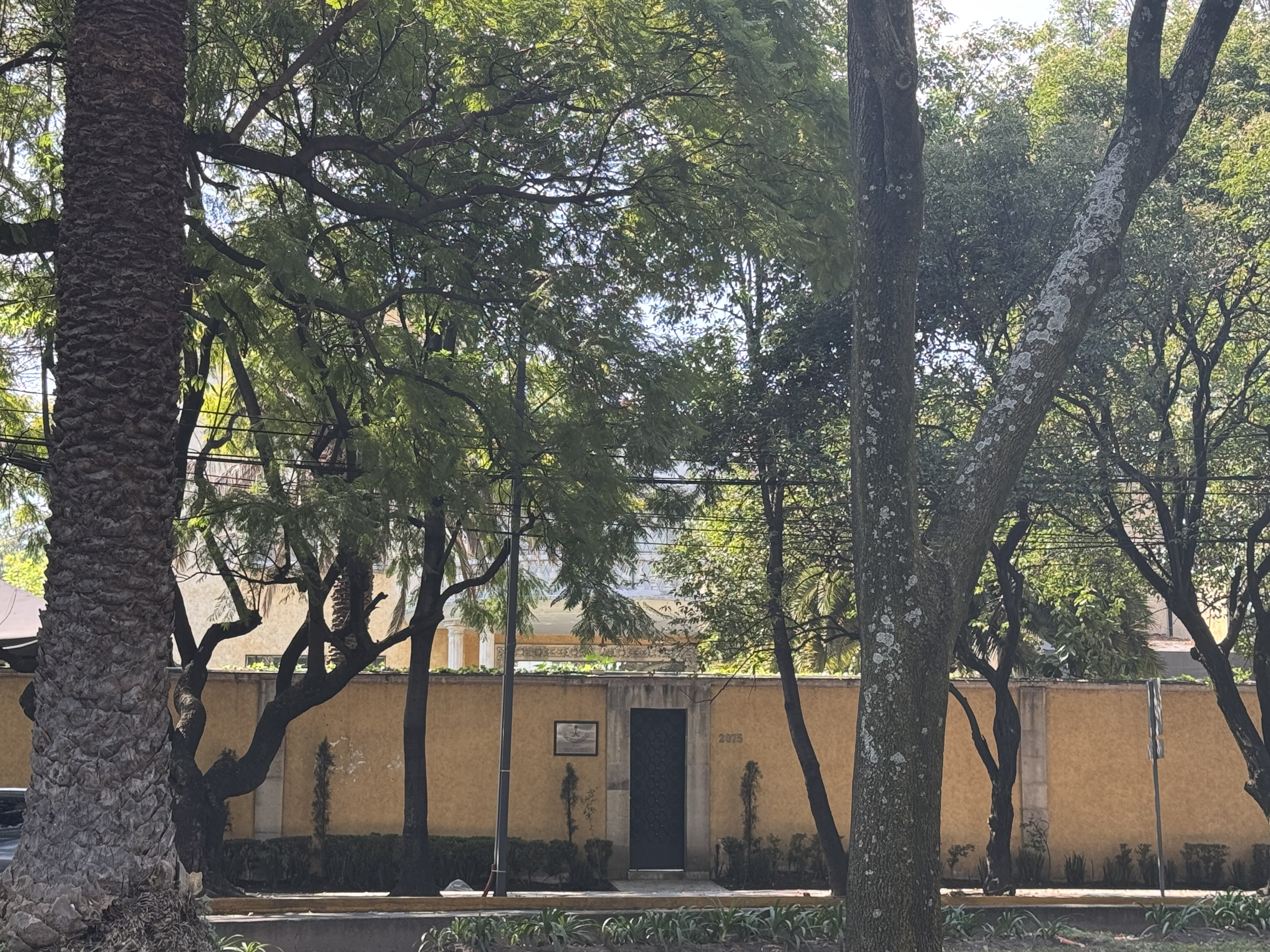
Embassy in Mexico City

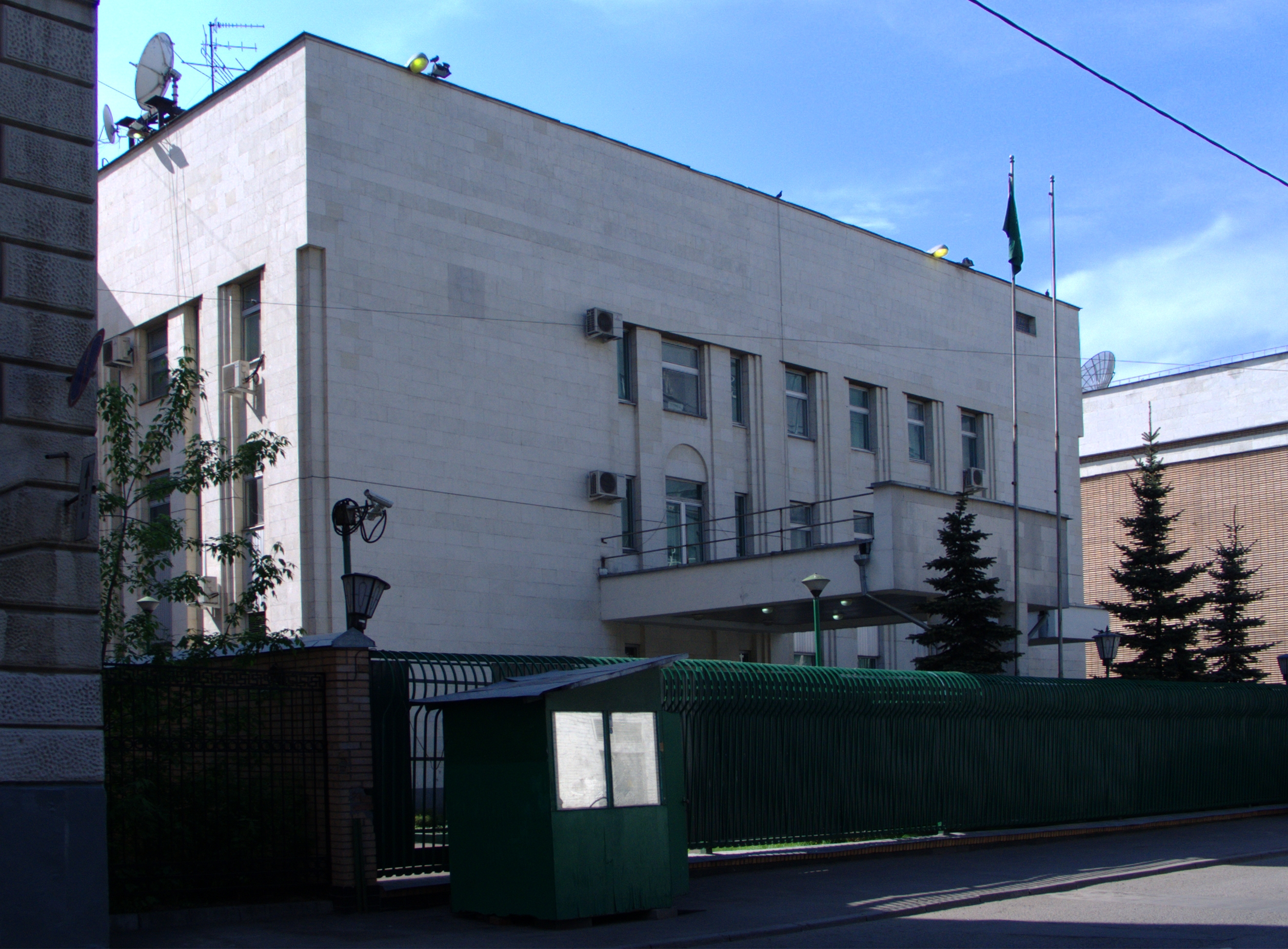
Embassy in Moscow

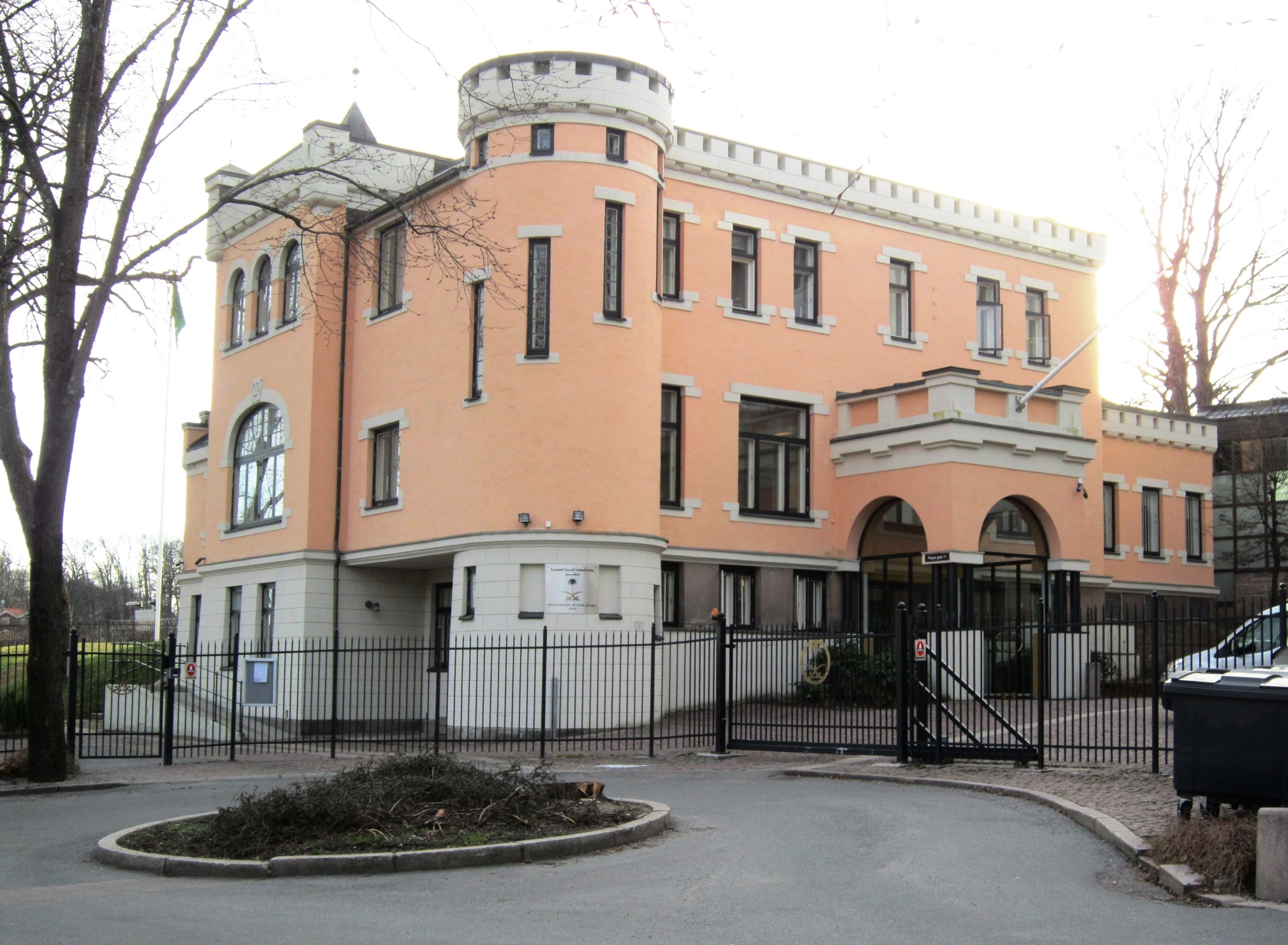
Embassy in Oslo

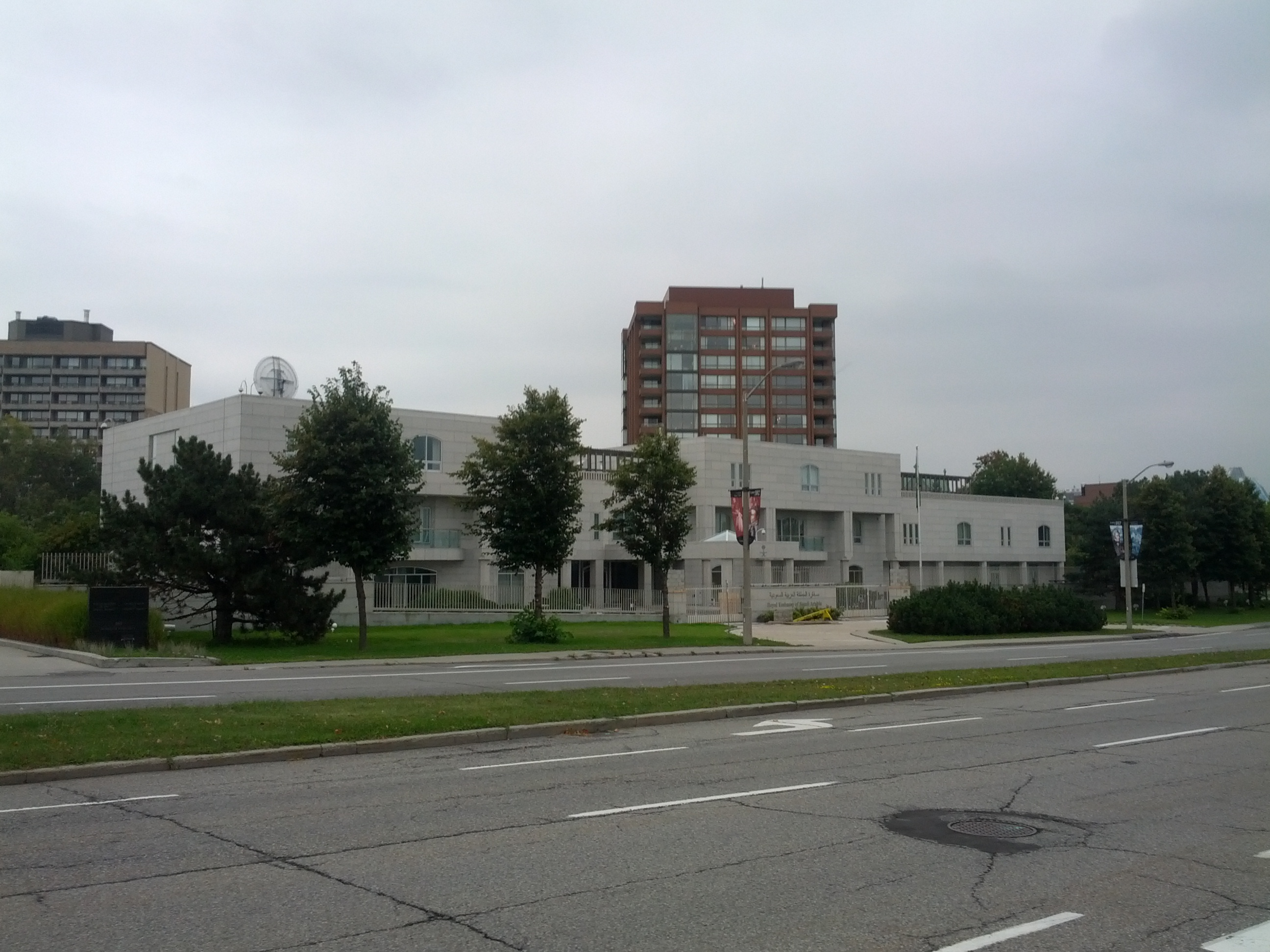
Embassy in Ottawa

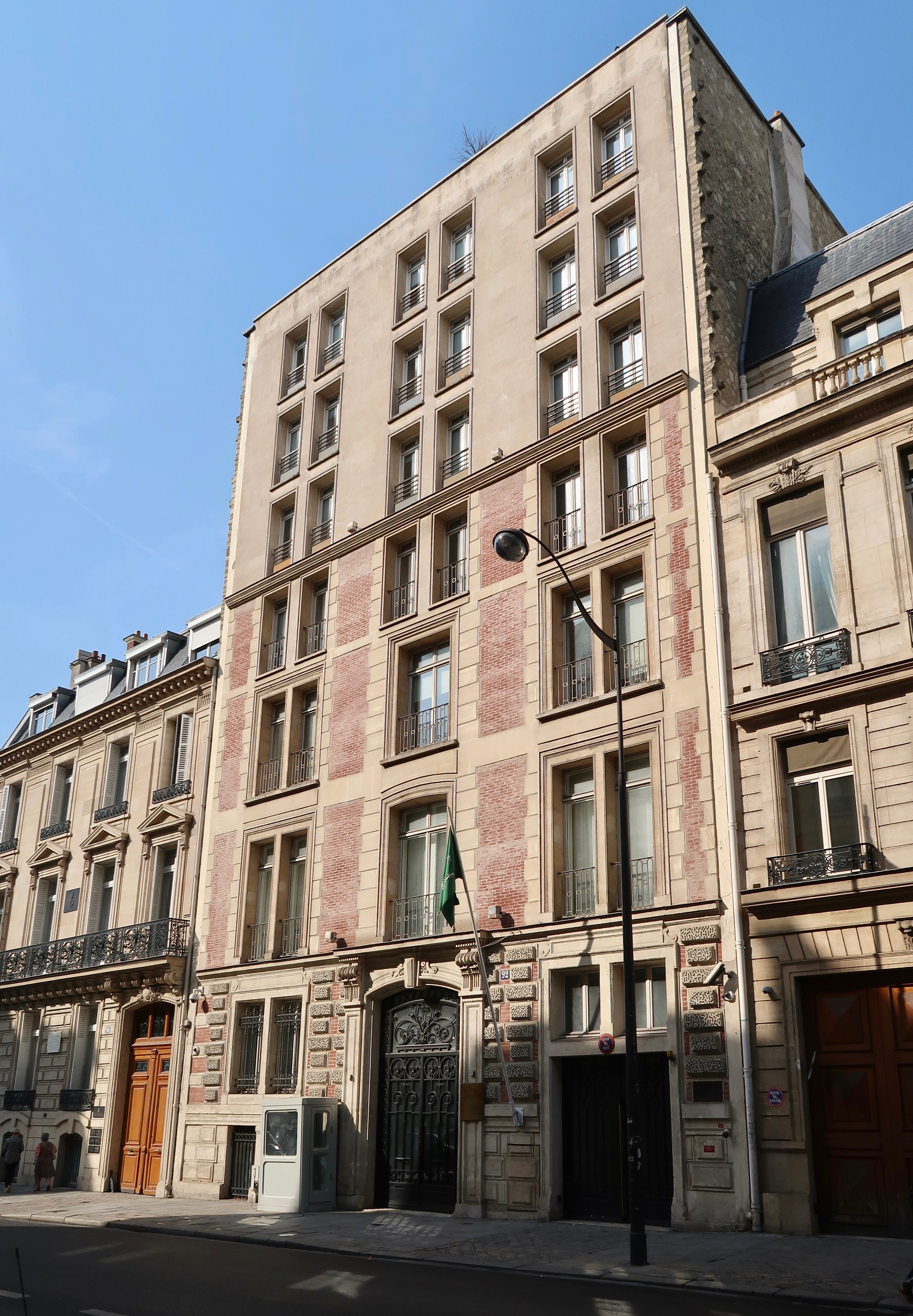
Embassy in Paris

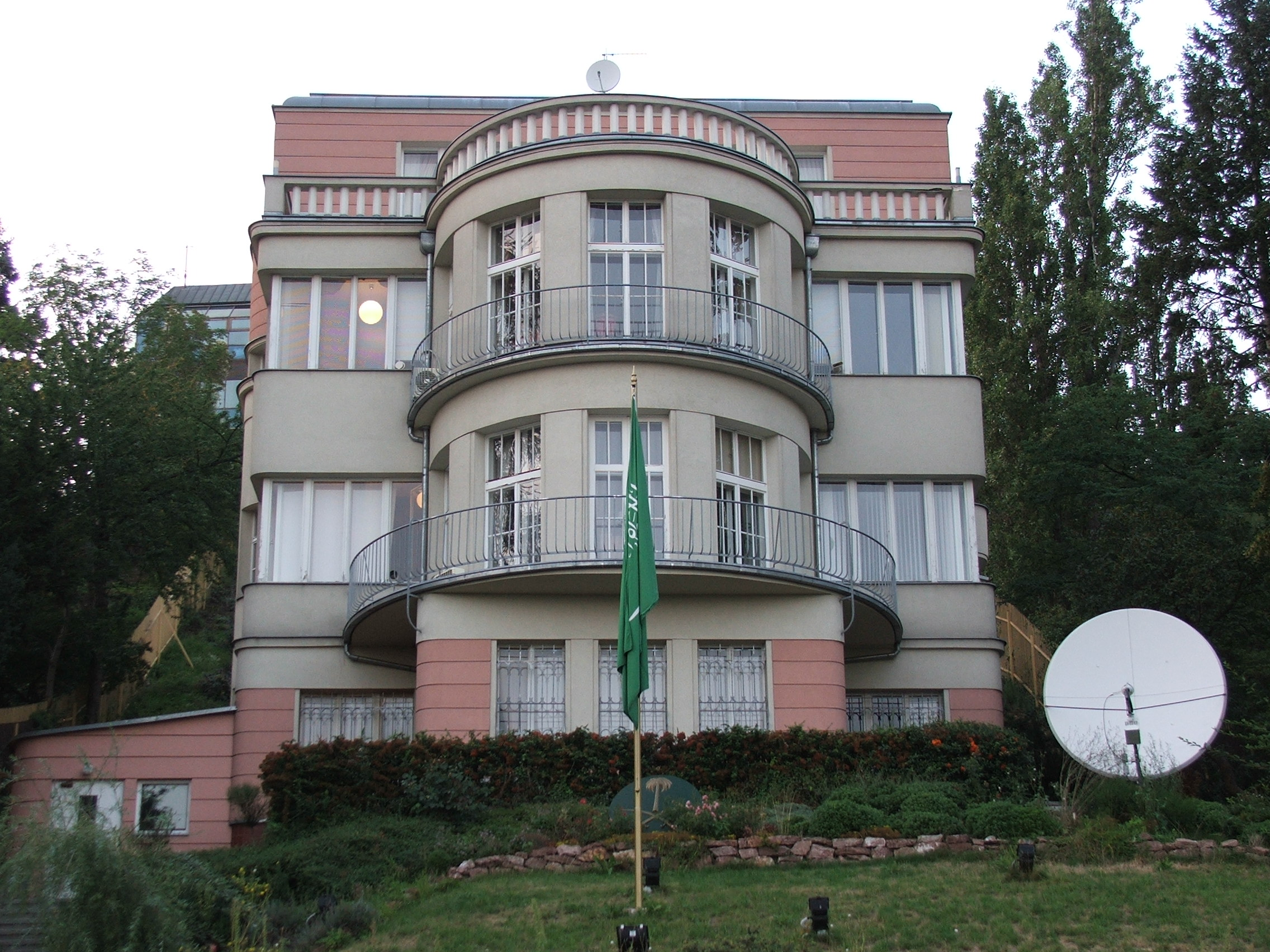
Embassy in Prague

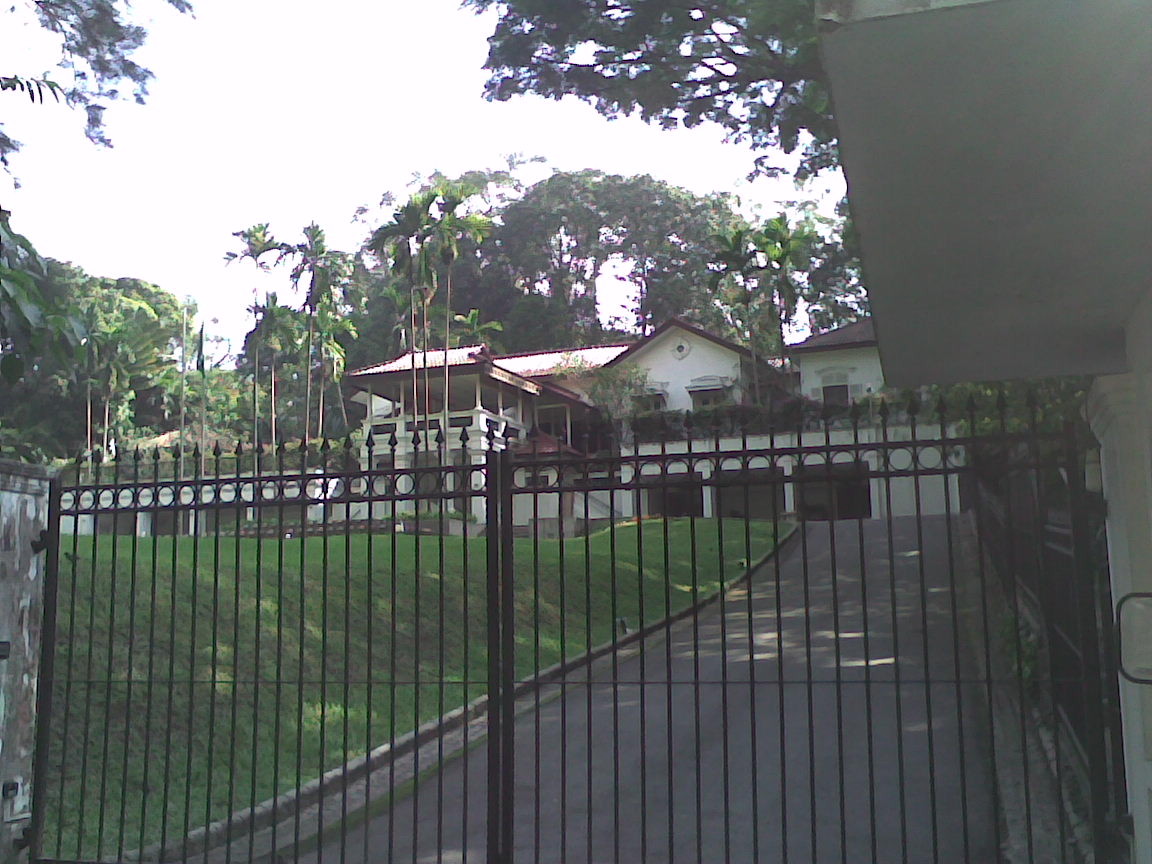
Embassy in Singapore

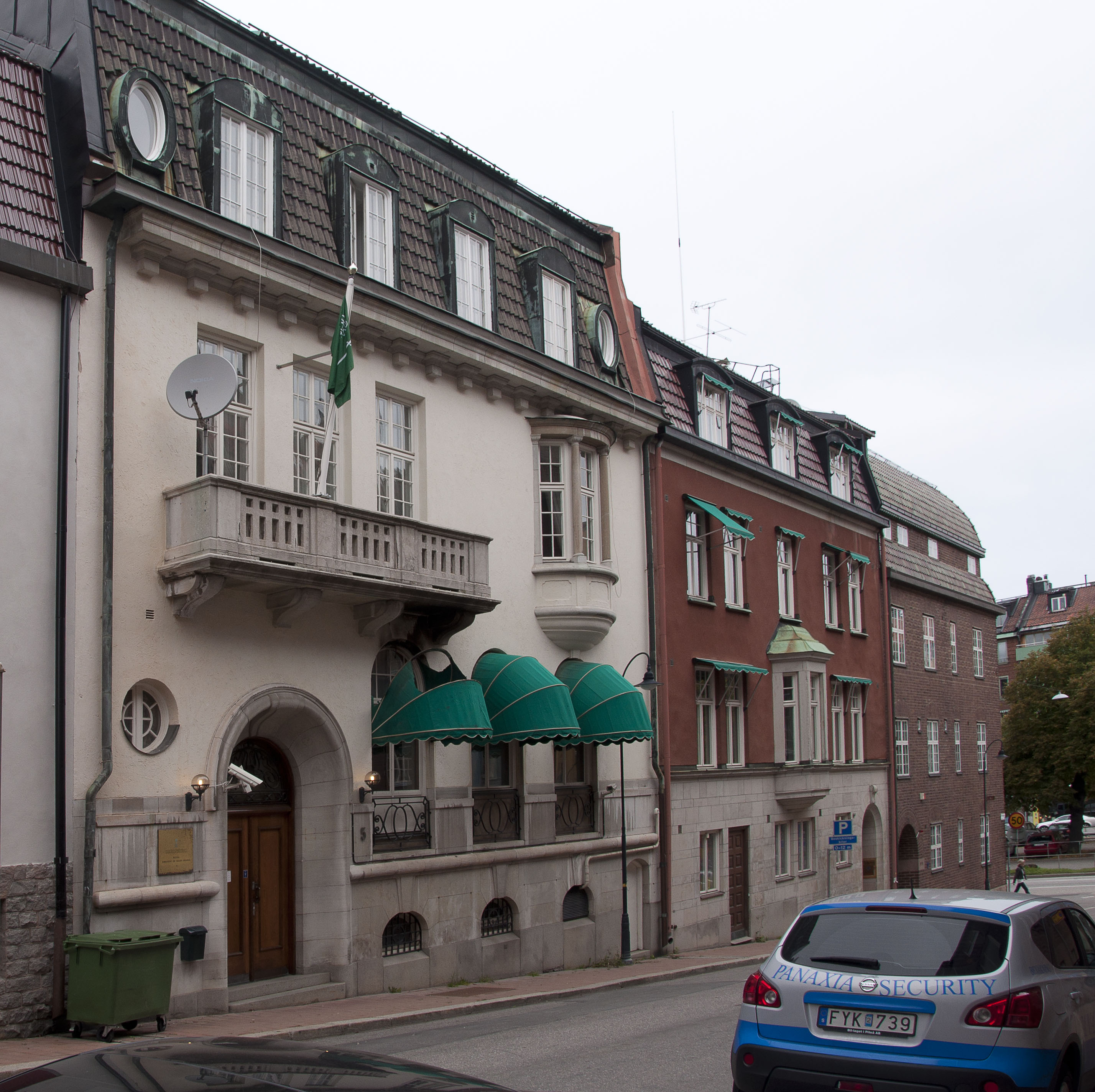
Embassy in Stockholm

Embassy in Tehran

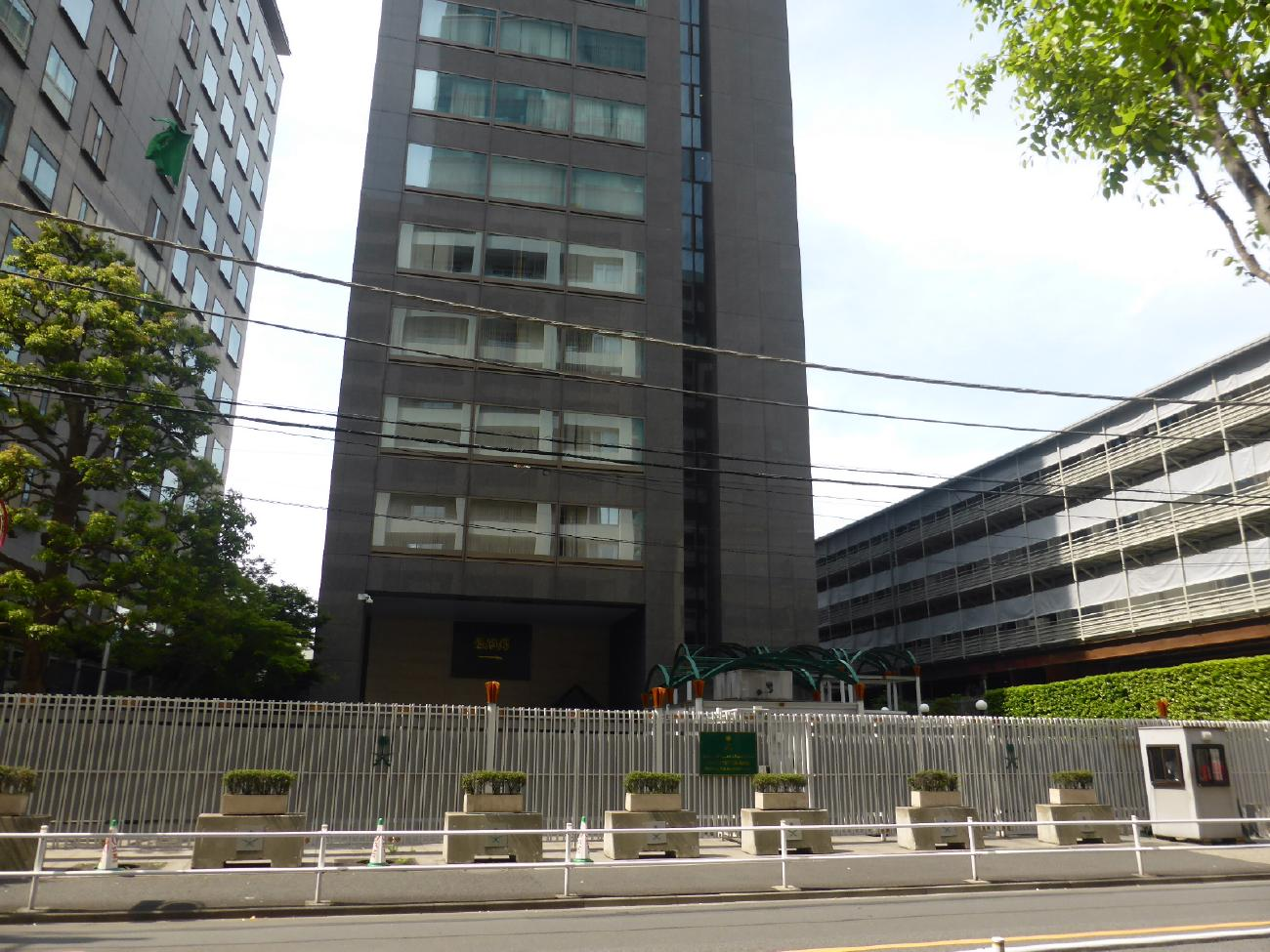
Embassy in Tokyo

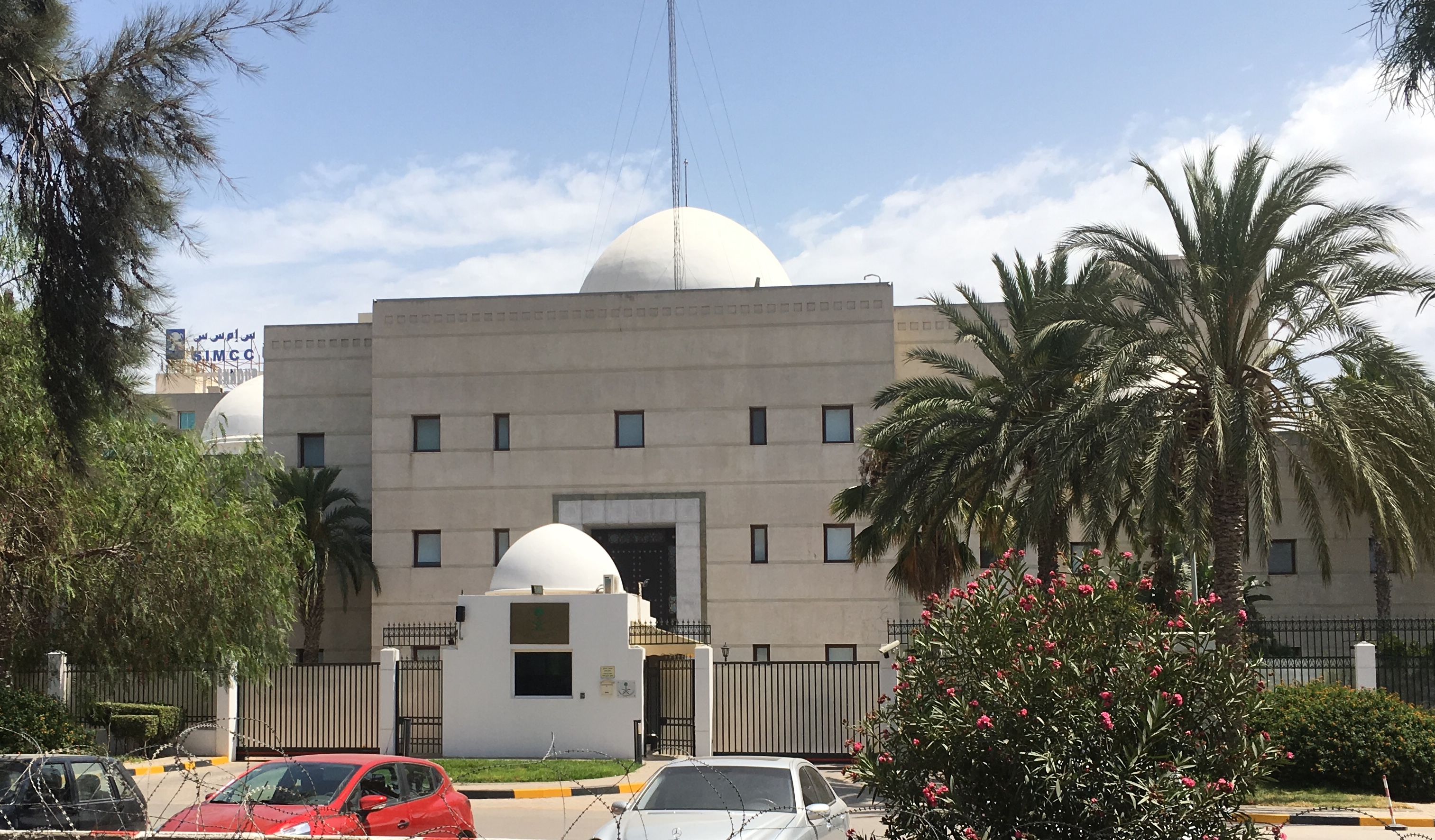
Embassy in Tunis

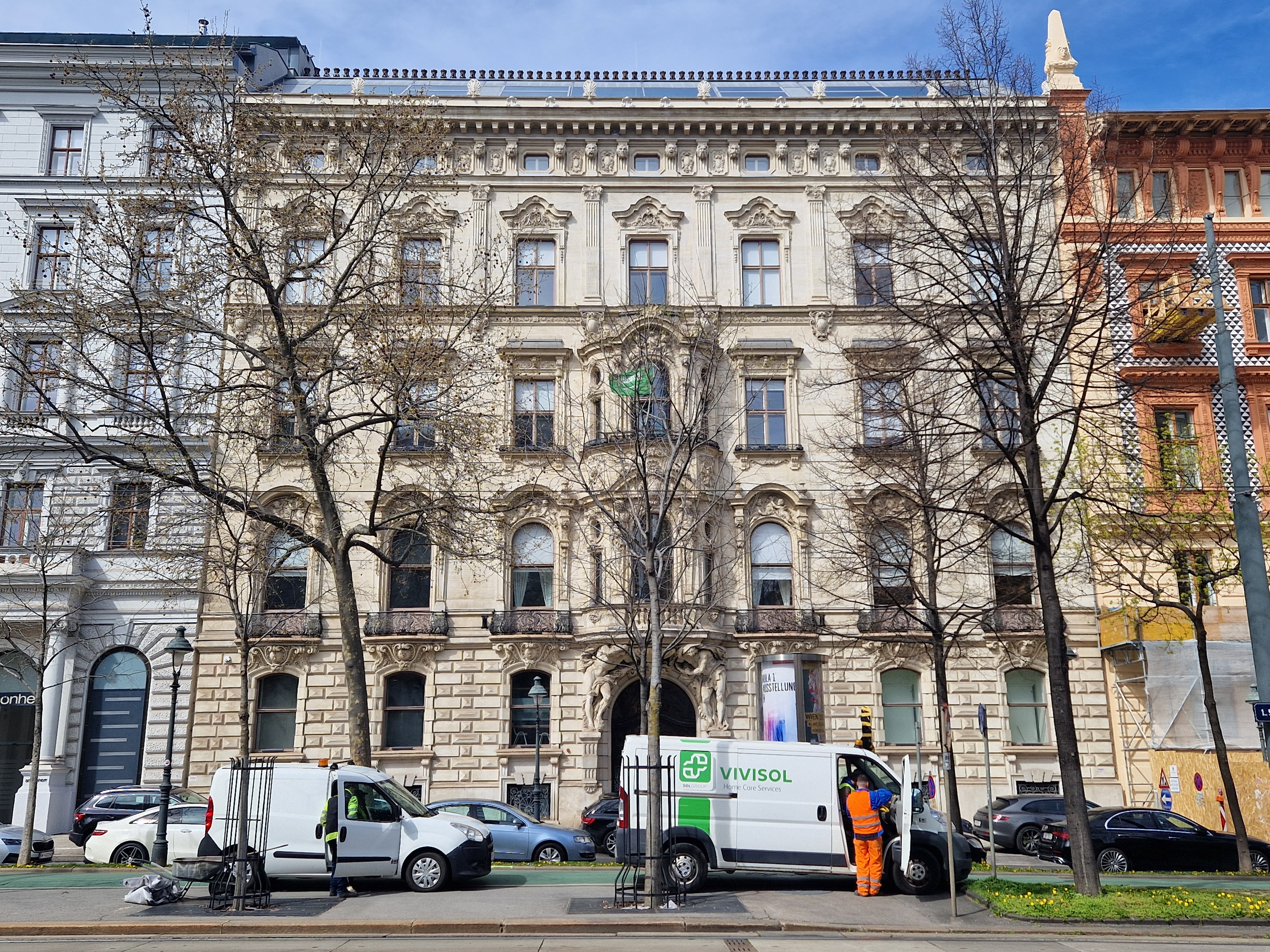
Embassy in Vienna

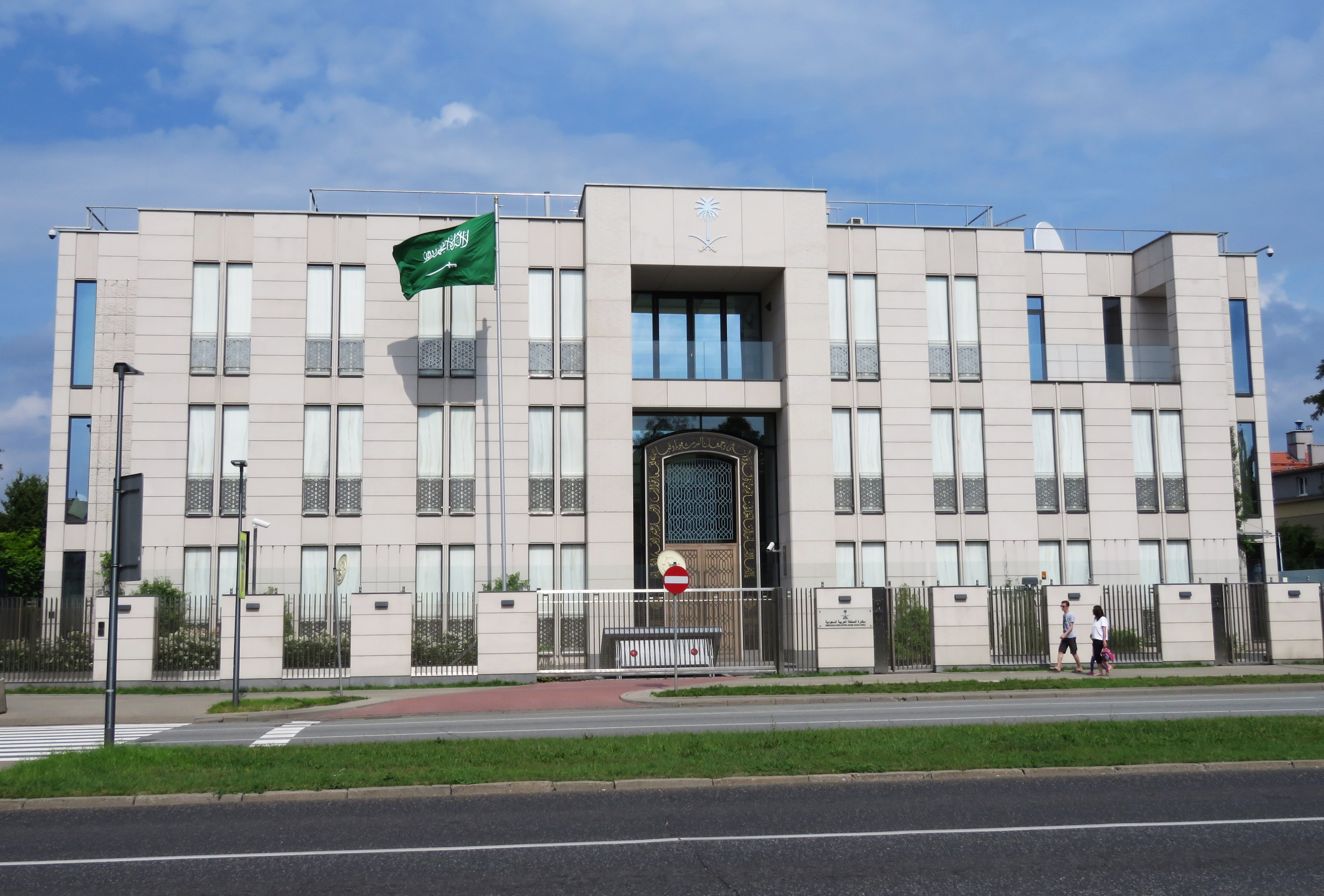
Embassy in Warsaw

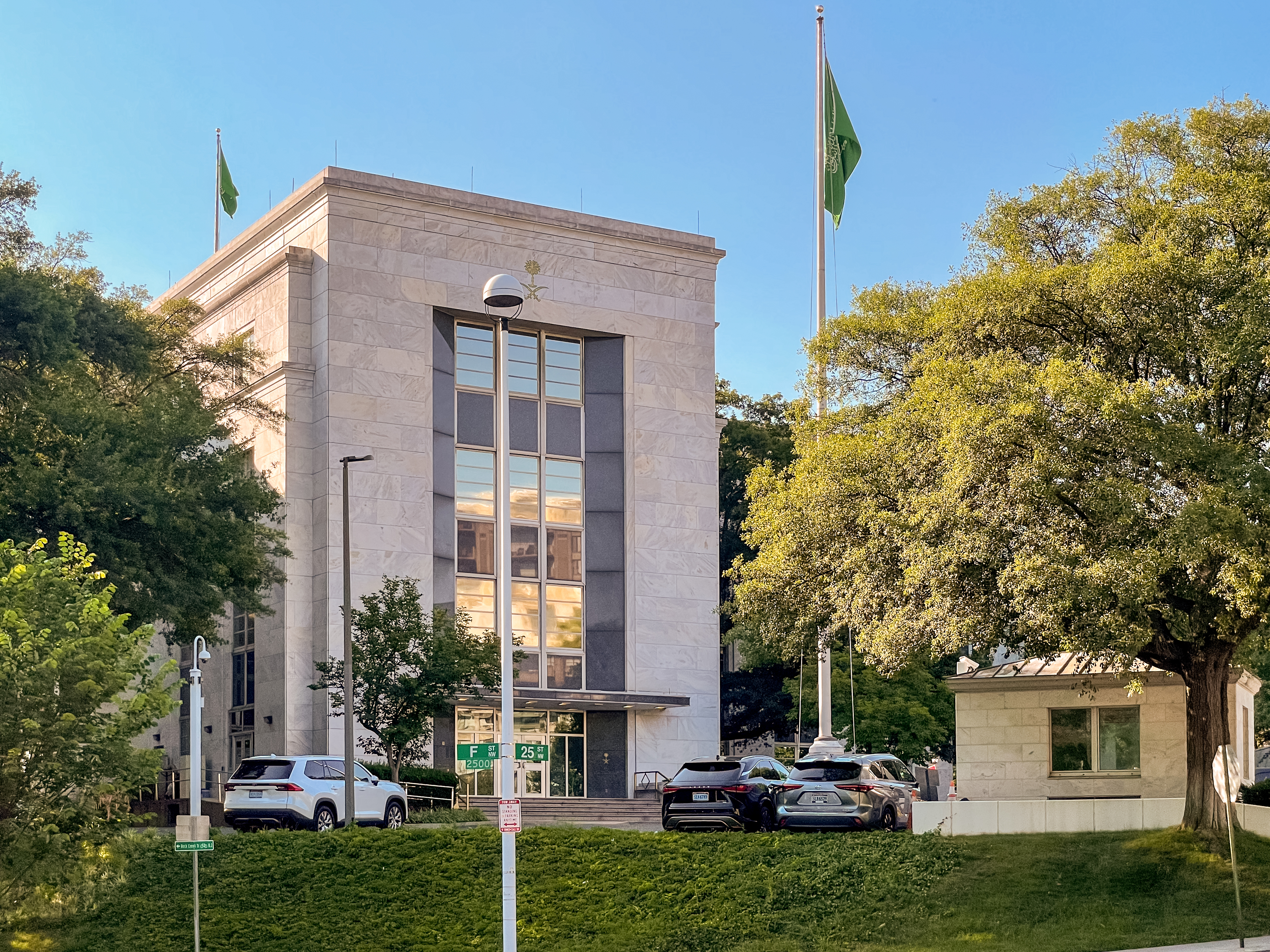
Embassy in Washington, D.C.

== To open ==
- Armenia
  - Yerevan (Embassy)
- Madagascar
  - Antananarivo (Embassy)
- Serbia
  - Belgrade (Embassy)
- Iraq
  - Najaf (Consulate General)

== See also ==
- List of diplomatic missions in Saudi Arabia
- Foreign relations of Saudi Arabia
