= Aviation and Special Forces Command =

- 中華民國陸軍航空特戰指揮部
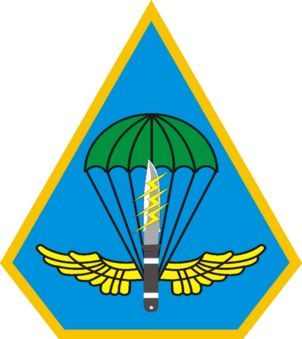
- Founded: Original: January 1, 1944; Current form: March 1, 1958
- Country: Republic of China (Taiwan)
- Branch: Republic of China Army
- Type: Special warfare operations
- Engagements: Third Taiwan Strait Crisis

The Republic of China Army Aviation and Special Forces Command (Chinese: 中華民國陸軍航空特戰指揮部) is the special operations force of the Republic of China Army. It is intended to be a highly mobile force that can quickly respond to PRC attacks against Taiwan's government.

== History ==
The command traces its origin to the 1st Airborne Division that was founded on January 1, 1944, in Kunming, Yunnan. The division was part of the Republic of China Air Force before being transferred to the Army on May 1, 1951. The Army Special Forces Headquarters was created on March 1, 1958, and was combined with the Army Airborne Headquarters on April 1, 1974. In 2006 it was renamed the Army Aviation and Special Forces Command.

== Organization ==
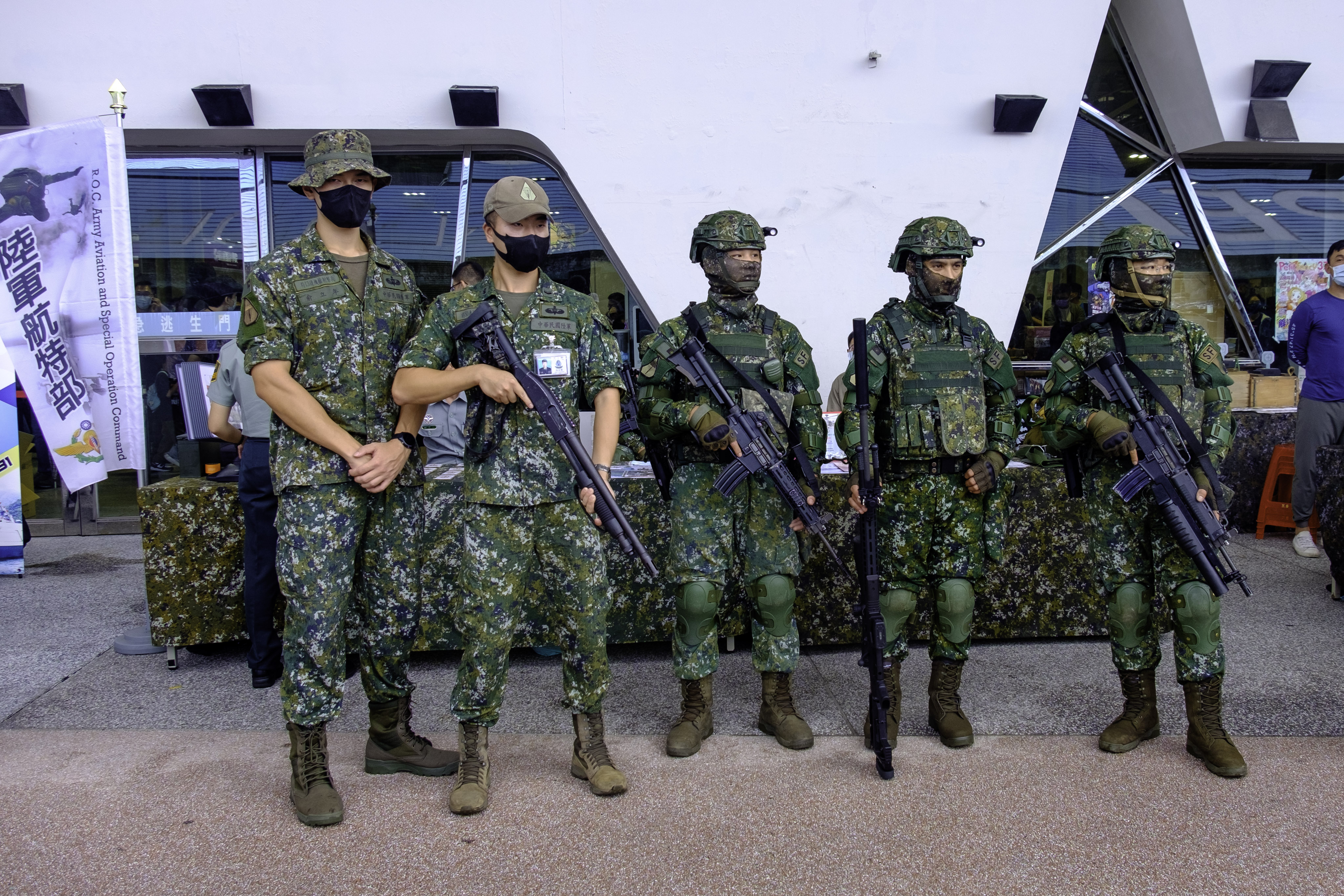
Members of the Aviation and Special Forces Command at a recruiting booth.

The command includes five special operations battalions (originally 862nd Special Operation Brigade), two helicopter brigades, two training centers, and separate units.

- 862nd Special Warfare Brigade
- 101st Amphibious Reconnaissance Battalion
- Airborne Special Service Company
- Army Aviation Training Center
- Army Special Forces Training Center
