= Croatia–Saudi Arabia relations =

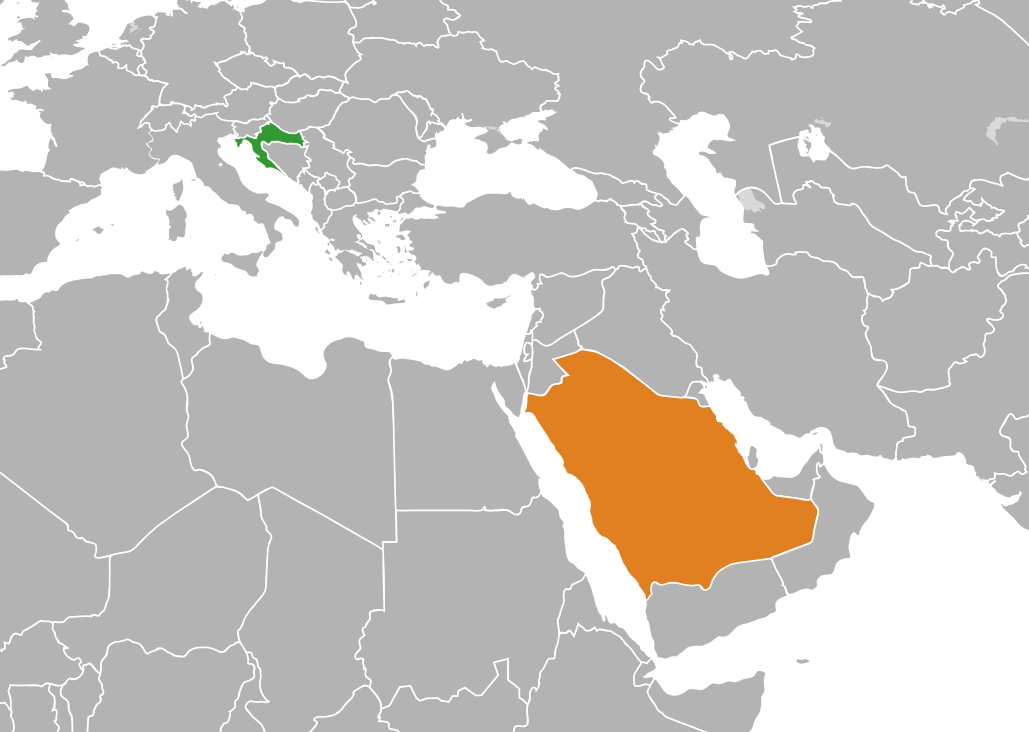

- Croatia: Saudi Arabia

Croatia and Saudi Arabia established diplomatic relations on 18 June 1995. Croatia is represented in Saudi Arabia through its embassy in Cairo, Egypt. Saudi Arabia has a non-resident ambassador in Sarajevo, Bosnia and Herzegovina.

Saudi Prince Al-Waleed bin Talal visited Croatia in August 2014 and met with the Croatian President Ivo Josipović and Minister of Economy Ivan Vrdoljak. The Prince expressed his desire to invest into Croatian tourism.

In his statement to the press he said: "For the past 6 years Croatia goes through some difficulties [economic crisis]. Rather than emphasize the negative, I prefer to emphasize the positive sides: you have stability, a good President, democracy, free press, freedom of speech and a very good tax system. I see that you still don't attract enough foreign investors, but I also see you work hard on it. Your tax system needs to be more attractive in comparison to other countries, you have to reduce bureaucracy and be more aggressive in attracting investment. I am always looking for an opportunity in any country, and what I see in Croatia is that the tourism sector is extremely important. Tourism revenue in Croatia in last year was around 6 billion euros and you had 10 million visitors. There is a potential that I seek."

Croatia exports military equipment to Saudi Arabia. In 2013, Croatia exported to Saudi Arabia weapons worth around 15 million euros (1.1 billion HRK).

== See also ==
- Foreign relations of Croatia
- Foreign relations of Saudi Arabia
- Yugoslavia and the Non-Aligned Movement
