= Saudi Arabia–Ukraine relations =

- Saudi Arabia: Ukraine

Saudi Arabia–Ukraine relations are the bilateral relations between Saudi Arabia and Ukraine. Saudi Arabia recognized Ukraine’s independence in 1992. Diplomatic relations between both countries were established in April 1993. Saudi Arabia has an embassy in Kyiv. Ukraine has an embassy in Riyadh and an honorary consulate in Jeddah.

== Political relations ==
In United Nations General Assembly Resolution 68/262 Saudi Arabia voted in favor of "territorial integrity of Ukraine" and strongly supports Ukraine.

On October 14, 2023, amid the Russian invasion of Ukraine, Saudi Arabia announced $400 million in humanitarian aid for Ukraine.

On February 27, 2024, Ukrainian President Volodymyr Zelenskyy praised the efforts of Saudi Arabia in seeking a solution to end the Russian invasion. Previously the kingdom acted as a mediator in prisoner swaps between Ukraine and Russia.

In March 2025, Ukrainian president Volodymyr Zelenskyy visited Saudi Arabia amid efforts for peace talks in the Russia-Ukraine war. The US expressed hope for progress on a ceasefire framework, although Zelenskyy did not attend the related discussions with US officials.

On March 15th 2026, President Zelenskyy said over 200 Ukrainian drone experts were already in the Middle East, including Saudi Arabia to protect the region from Iranian drones.

== High-level visits ==
Guest	Host	Place of visit	Date of visit	Notes
(Ukraine) President Leonid Kuchma	(Saudi Arabia) King Fahd bin Abdulaziz Al Saud	Riyadh	17-19 January 2003	
(Ukraine) President Petro Poroshenko	(Saudi Arabia) King Salman bin Abdulaziz Al Saud	Riyadh	24 January 2015	took part in the funeral ceremony of King Abdullah bin Abdulaziz Al Saud.
(Ukraine) President Volodymyr Zelenskyy	(Saudi Arabia) Crown Prince Mohammed bin Salman	Jeddah	19 May 2023	Attended the 2023 AL summit.
(Ukraine) President Volodymyr Zelenskyy	(Saudi Arabia) Crown Prince Mohammed bin Salman	Riyadh	27 February 2024	
(Ukraine) President Volodymyr Zelenskyy	(Saudi Arabia) Crown Prince Mohammed bin Salman	Jeddah	12 June 2024	
(Ukraine) President Volodymyr Zelenskyy	(Saudi Arabia) Crown Prince Mohammed bin Salman	Riyadh	March 10–11, 2025	
(Ukraine) President Volodymyr Zelenskyy	(Saudi Arabia) Crown Prince Mohammed bin Salman	Jeddah	March 26, 2026	During the visit, Zelenskyy the first visit since the outbreak of 2026 Iran war.
(Ukraine) President Volodymyr Zelenskyy	(Saudi Arabia) Crown Prince Mohammed bin Salman	Jeddah	April 24, 2026	

== Economic relations ==
In 2020, bilateral trade amounted to USD820.9 million.

== Cultural relations ==
Ukraine is promoting tourism from Arabic speaking countries especially Saudi Arabia. Ukraine abolished visas for citizens of Saudi Arabia and the opening of direct flights between the two countries would facilitate greater tourism.

== Resident diplomatic missions ==
- Saudi Arabia has an embassy in Kyiv.
- Ukraine has an embassy in Riyadh.
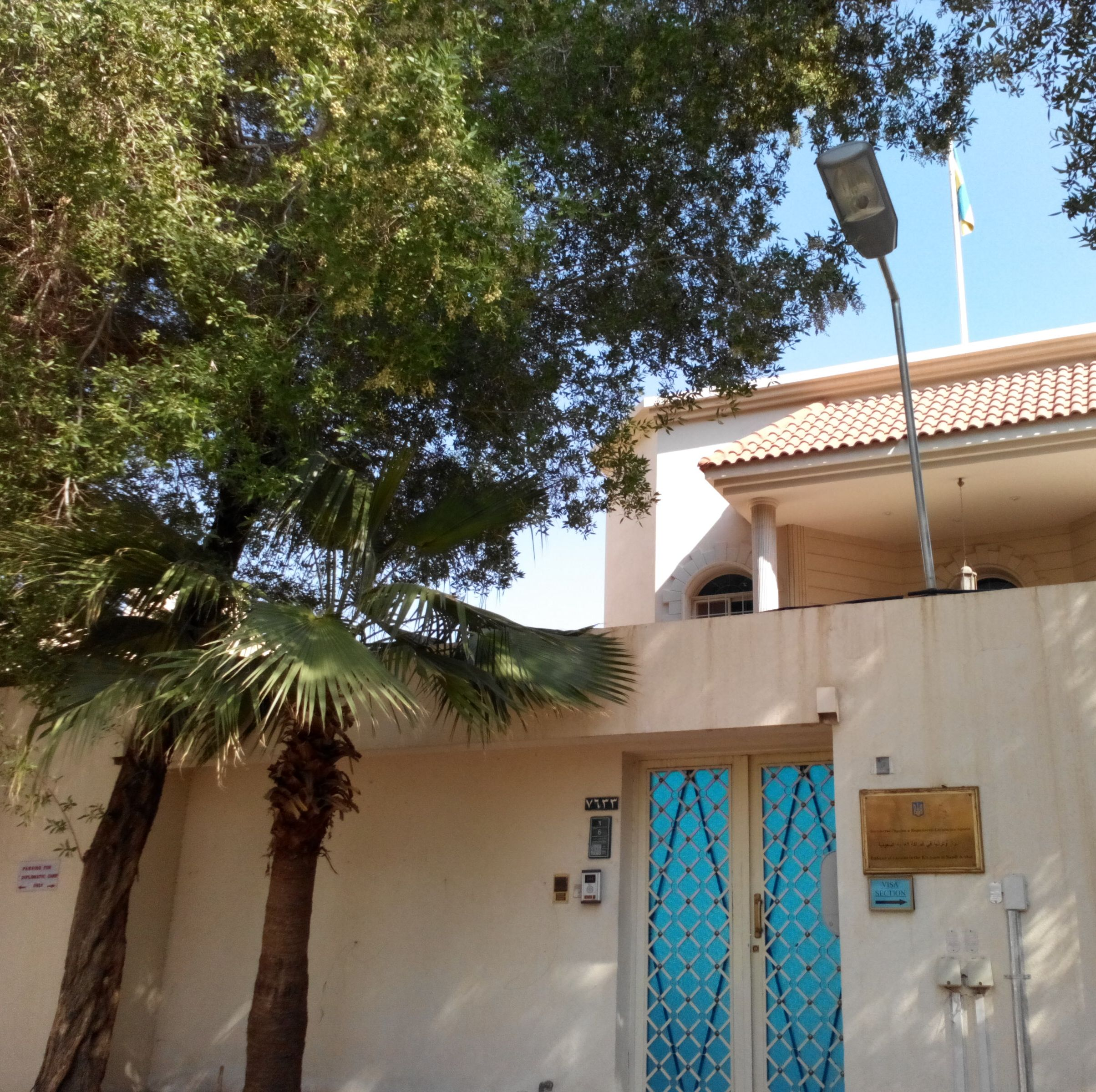
Embassy of Ukraine in Riyadh

== See also ==
- Foreign relations of Saudi Arabia
- Foreign relations of Ukraine
- Russia–Saudi Arabia relations
