= Austria–Saudi Arabia relations =

- Austria: Saudi Arabia

Foreign relations exist between Austria and Saudi Arabia. Both countries had diplomatic contact since 7 July 1880, with the opening of an Austrian consulate in Jeddah (then under Ottoman occupation). Official and direct diplomatic relations were established on 10 September 1957. Today, Austria has an embassy in Riyadh and Saudi Arabia has an embassy in Vienna.

In October 2001, the President of Austria Thomas Klestil paid a state visit to Saudi Arabia.

In April 2004, then Crown Prince Abdullah of Saudi Arabia paid a state visit to Austria.

In March 2006, the President of Austria Heinz Fischer paid a state visit to Saudi Arabia.

== Resident diplomatic mission ==
- Austria has an embassy in Riyadh.
- Saudi Arabia has an embassy in Vienna.

== See also ==
- Foreign relations of Austria
- Foreign relations of Saudi Arabia
