= Japan–Saudi Arabia relations =

- Japan: Saudi Arabia

Diplomatic mission
- Embassy of Japan, Riyadh: Embassy of Saudi Arabia, Tokyo

Japan–Saudi Arabia relations (Arabic: العلاقات السعودية اليابانية, Japanese: 日本とサウジアラビアの関係) are the foreign relations between Saudi Arabia and Japan. Most new Official relations between the two nations were established in 1955.

Since then-Japan was the world's third largest economy, as well as the second largest during large parts of the latter half of the 20th century, and Saudi Arabia which is home to two holy cities and is the world's largest oil producer, have developed their mutual interests. In 2015, Japan became the third-largest trading partner of Saudi Arabia, importing $45.4 billion in petroleum products and exporting $7.5 billion in finished goods.

== History ==
=== The first half of 20th century ===
The first official contacts between the two nations occurred in 1938 when Saudi envoy to the United Kingdom, Hafiz Wahba, visited the Empire of Japan to attend the opening of the Tokyo Mosque. In the following year the Japanese envoy to Egypt, Yokoyama, visited Saudi Arabia and met with Ibn Saud of Saudi Arabia in Riyadh.

Both of the monarchs maintained weak ties during the following years; however, the Japanese Attack on Pearl Harbor in December 1941 brought Japan–US relations to a state of war and led to a breakdown in relations between the Axis powers and the Kingdom of Saudi Arabia. Finally, in March 1945, the kingdom declared war on Japan and Nazi Germany. As a result of the catastrophic war, Japan lost three million lives and all its overseas territories, namely the Korean Peninsula, Taiwan, Manchuria, the South Seas Mandate, the southern part of Sakhalin and all of the Kurils.

=== The latter half of 20th century ===
In 1953 the Japanese government sent its first delegation to the UK Economic and accelerated the process to culminate in the establishment of diplomatic relations between the two countries in 1955, and passed the economic relations between the two countries, an important station in the year 1957 as the Kingdom was granted the right of privilege to explore for oil.

The first Saudi Royal visit to Japan occurred in 1960, when Sultan bin Abdulaziz visited the country in his capacity as Minister for Transportation and Communication.

The visit of King Faisal bin Abdul Aziz to Tokyo in 1971 strengthened their bilateral relations and it launched the most important stage in the history of Saudi-Japanese relations, which has seen many of the mutual visits of officials of the two countries. Thereafter, the bonds of relations between the Saudi royal family and the Japanese imperial family were strengthened through their repeated visits.

In 1981, when Emperor Akihito and Empress Michiko were Crown Prince and Princess during the reign of Emperor Hirohito, the couple visited Saudi Arabia.

And on behalf of the Custodian of the Two Holy Mosques King Fahd bin Abdul Aziz was attended by His Royal Highness Prince Nawwaf bin Abdul Aziz, crown emperor decrees year 1990, and in 1994 the Crown and the parent in Japan during a visit to the Kingdom.

In 1997, Ryutaro Hashimoto, then-prime minister of Japan, visited Saudi Arabia at that time as part of the Kingdom of the Custodian of the Two Holy Mosques King Fahd bin Abdul Aziz.

In the month of October of the year 1998, he visited the Custodian of the Two Holy Mosques King Abdullah bin Abdul Aziz, Japan, when he was crown prince, and Saudi Arabia signed the agenda of cooperation with Japanese Prime Minister Keizo Obuchi, was His Royal Highness Prince Salman bin Abdulaziz, Emir of Riyadh region and later king, had visited Japan in April of the same year.

=== The first half of 21st century ===
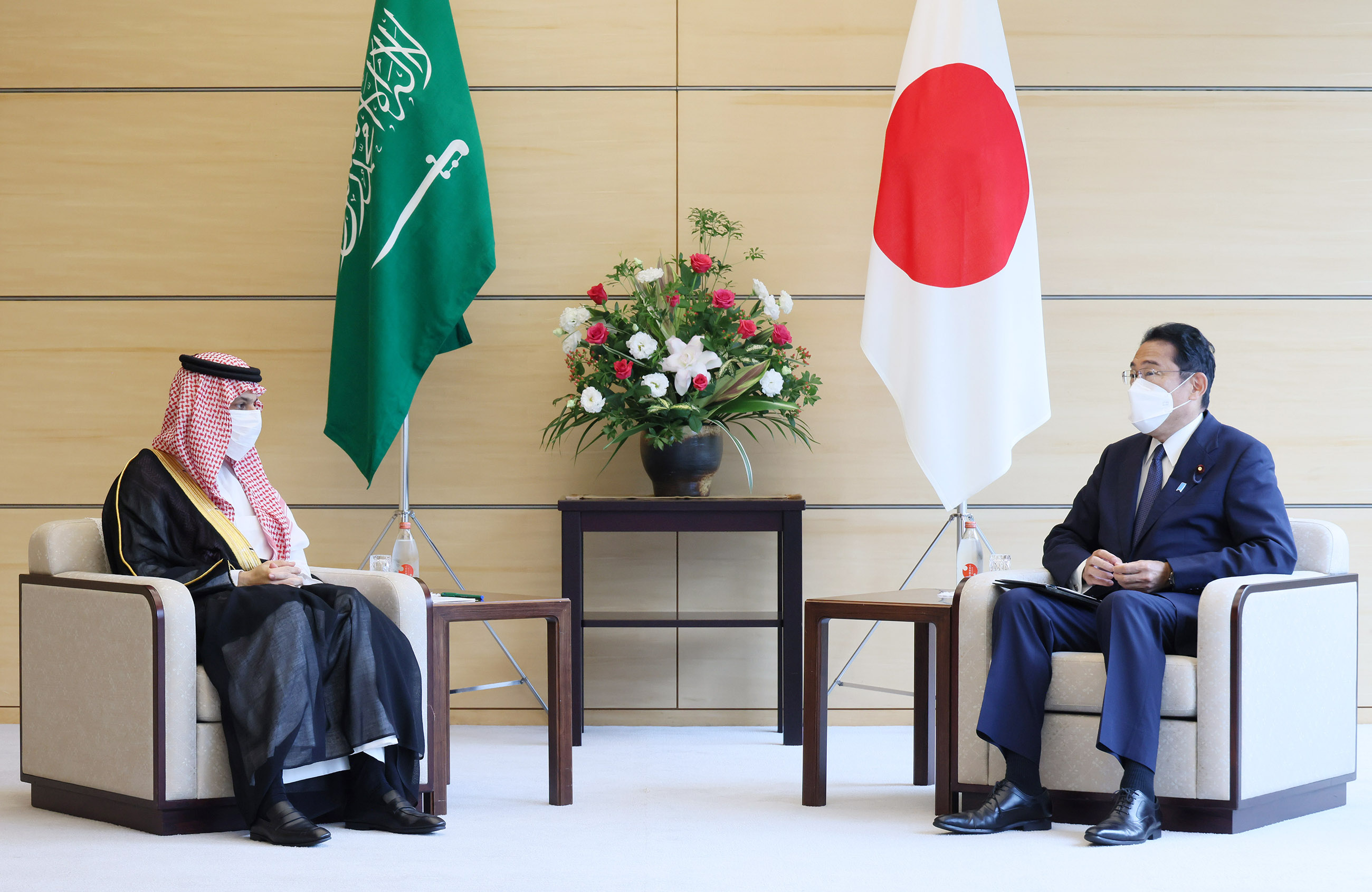
Japanese Foreign Minister Fumio Kishida and Saudi Foreign Minister Faisal bin Farhan Al Saud on 19 July 2022

In 2001 Japanese Foreign Minister Yohei Kono visited Saudi Arabia. He met with Crown Prince Abdullah bin Abdul-Aziz to discuss a plan to meet the region's needs for drinking water with the aim of further extending co-operation between the two countries. Initiatives were announced in three areas: the promotion of dialogue between the Islamic and non-Islamic worlds, the development of water resources, and wide-ranging political dialogue.

Japan is the third-largest trading partner of Saudi Arabia and by the end of 2000 Japan had invested more than three billion US dollars in the country.

In March 2017, King Salman bin Abdulaziz visited Japan and had a meeting with Japanese Prime Minister Shinzō Abe in Tokyo, where the two leaders exchanged opinions and discussed international security and Saudi-Japan Vision 2030, a program of bilateral cooperation aimed at realizing Saudi Vision 2030. Afterwards, the Saudi-Japan Vision 2030 plan was announced and published.

In January 2020, Prime Minister Shinzō Abe met Saudi Arabian Crown Prince Mohammed bin Salman in Al-'Ula, Saudi Arabia, after Japan's decision to dispatch a Maritime Self-Defense Force (MSDF) including warships and aircraft, to protect their ships in the Gulf of Oman and Arabian Sea, following the Persian Gulf crisis.

== Economic relations ==
These relations between the Kingdom and Japan have been translated on the ground and the special district is the economic reality of Japan finished second in the list of the most important trading partners of the Kingdom, with exports of 52,394 million Saudi riyals and imports of 91,341 million riyals in 2003.

In the area of the joint projects of the size of Saudi-Japanese joint projects in the Kingdom of 74 projects including 41 industrial projects, and (33) non-industrial projects with a capital of 67.45622 million representing the share of the Saudi side of the 70.74% and the Japanese side 05,25% and the rest to other investors, or 34.0%.

The two countries have signed an agreement on economic and technical cooperation from the year 1975, which also included the establishment of the Saudi-Japanese Joint Committee to monitor the implementation of the terms of the agreement between the two countries.

The visit by the Custodian of the Two Holy Mosques King Abdullah bin Abdul Aziz when he was crowned prince to Japan, one of the most important stations in the history of relations between the two countries, especially economic and technical as it was signed during the visit a joint declaration on cooperation between the UK and Japan for the atheist and the era of the twentieth century, which included Many of the pillars, which included confirmation of the leaderships of the two countries and their commitment to do their utmost to implement the program of joint cooperation and stressed the importance of the role of the private sector in promoting bilateral economic ties and agreed on the need to encourage and facilitate cooperation in the private sector in both countries in addition to the importance of cooperation for the development of trade relations and investment in the oil.

Was also signed to the program of joint cooperation between the UK and Japan, which includes the formation of four task forces, as well as the Joint Declaration for Cooperation in the field of Youth, Sports, and Culture between the Government of the Kingdom, and Japan were also planning a visit to a delegation of Saudi businessmen to Japan aimed at the definition of export potential and capacity of the Kingdom and the opportunity to invest and establish projects involved, incentives and facilities available in this regard and strongly urged them to increase imports from the UK, and has been making an exhibition in Saudi Arabia in Tokyo and Osaka in 2000, was also signed in the same year on the bilateral agreement to open markets in goods and services with Japan.

Japan is considered one of the most important partners to Saudi Arabia with total trade of $39 billion. In 2019, Saudi Arabia and Japan signed a number of agreements that aim at implementing projects in a number of strategic areas including, education and manufacturing. In the same year, a forum entitled: "Saudi-Japan Vision 2030 Business Forum" was held in Tokyo. The main aim of the forum is to boost the business relations between the two countries.

== Sports ==
=== Football ===
Both Japan and Saudi Arabia men's national teams are along the most prominent members of the Asian Football Confederation (AFC) being the two most successful teams along with Iran of the AFC Asian Cup while they also compete in the Asian Games and being the two Asian teams with most appearances in the FIFA World Cup along with Iran and after South Korea with 7 editions played by Japan and 6 by Saudi Arabia.

The Saudi squad visited Japan for 2002 FIFA World Cup playing against the German team in Sapporo on June 1, against the Cameroon team in Saitama on June 6, and against the Irish team in Yokohama on June 11.

=== Karate: Cup of Japanese Ambassador ===
On 3 May 2012, "the Cup of Japanese Ambassador" of Karate was jointly organized by the Embassy of Japan in Saudi Arabia and the Karate Federation in Saudi Arabia. A trophy and medals were awarded to the winners by H.E. Mr. Shigeru Endo，Ambassador of Japan to the Kingdom of Saudi Arabia. With the attendance of Mr. Ibrahim Abdulrahman, Vice President of Saudi Arabian Karate Federation, Mr. Humud bin Saud, Secretary General of Saudi Arabian Karate Federation and many Saudi people, this championship contributed to promoting the sports exchanges between Japan and Saudi Arabia.

== Resident diplomatic missions ==
- Japan has an embassy in Riyadh and a consulate-general in Jeddah.
- Saudi Arabia has an embassy in Tokyo.
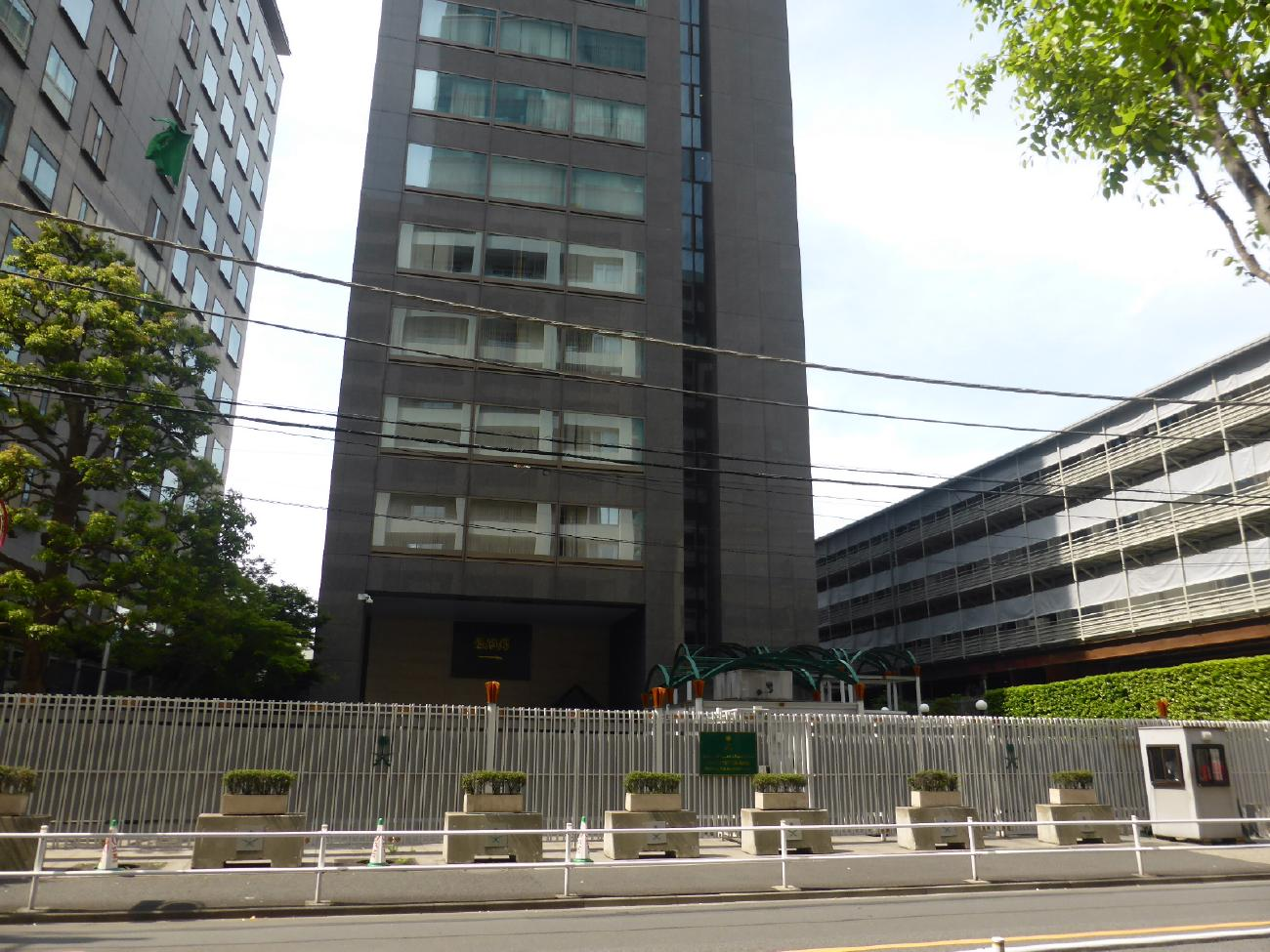
Embassy of Saudi Arabia in Tokyo

== See also ==
- Foreign relations of Japan
- Foreign relations of Saudi Arabia
