= Indonesia–Saudi Arabia relations =

- Indonesia: Saudi Arabia

Diplomatic mission
- Embassy of Indonesia, Riyadh: Embassy of Saudi Arabia, Jakarta

Envoy
- Ambassador Dr. Abdul Aziz Ahmad: Ambassador Faisal Abdullah Al-Amudi

Indonesia and Saudi Arabia established diplomatic relations on 1 May 1950. Relations are particularly important because Saudi Arabia is the birthplace of Islam, and Indonesia is a Muslim-majority country and an OIC member; both are Muslim majority countries. Economy and trade relations are also particularly important, especially on oil (energy) and human resources (migrant worker) sectors. Saudi Arabia has an embassy in Jakarta, while Indonesia has an embassy in Riyadh and a consulate in Jeddah. Both countries are members of the Organisation of Islamic Cooperation and G-20 major economies.

== History ==
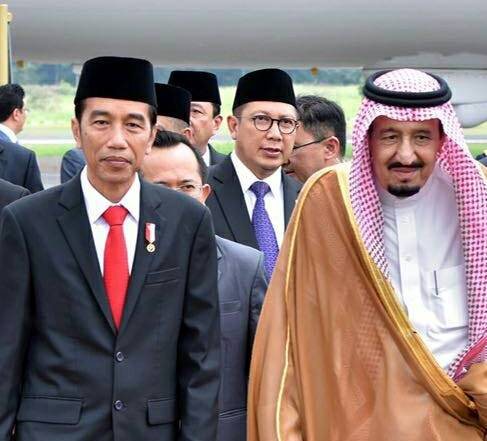
Indonesian President Joko Widodo with King Salman of Saudi Arabia in 2017

The historical link between Indonesia and Saudi Arabia was Islam. Numerous Muslim traders and ulamas arrived in the Indonesian archipelago from the Arab World during the coming of Islam around the 13th century. The earliest evidence of an Indonesian traveling to Mecca can be seen from a late 15th-century Yemeni biography, the person was described as a "Jawa" and was travelling sometime between 1277 and 1367 CE. Groups of Acehnese were recorded to live in groups in the Hejaz since at least the early 17th century. Continuing into the early 20th century, Indonesian Muslims have taken the hajj pilgrimage to Mecca. Indonesia sends the largest number of hajj pilgrims among Muslim countries. Official diplomatic relations between Indonesia and Saudi Arabia were opened in 1950.

The two countries signed a defense cooperation agreement in late January 2014. The agreement largely covers force training and counter-terrorism.

The Indonesians improved relations with Saudi under Joko Widodo's administration, this was exemplified when the president was awarded with the Order of Abdulaziz al Saud in 2015 by the Saudi authorities.

On 2 July 2025, the two countries signed multiple agreements and memorandums of understanding totaling approximately $27 billion with business sector organizations in areas such as clean energy and petrochemicals. They also decided to improve supply chains and their sustainability in the energy sector, increase collaboration in the supply of crude oil and its derivatives, and improve cooperation in the field of natural resources.

== Trade ==
In 2008, bilateral trade reached nearly US$6 billion. Because of its oil and gas exports, the trade balance is heavily in favor to Saudi Arabia, while Indonesia mainly exports plywood, textiles, apparel, palm oil, paper and tires.

== Migrant workers and human rights abuses ==
Saudi Arabia is a major employer for thousands of Indonesian workers, mostly in the domestic sector as house maids. As of 2018, there are around 600,000 Indonesians working in Saudi Arabia. However, there are reports of abuses of Indonesian migrant workers by their Saudi Arabian employers. There are reports of physical abuses, and some led to the death of Indonesian maids. Most of the time, justice was not enforced in Saudi Arabia as the abusers have rarely faced punishment greater than a fine. Some of these cases have attracted worldwide attention.

Another problem is the number of Indonesian workers facing death row in Saudi Arabia. These Indonesian maids have been arrested on alleged charges of murder, witchcraft and sexual offenses. In June 2012, around 32 Indonesian housemaids were arrested and held under death sentences. A few maids were sentenced to death earlier.

== High level visits ==
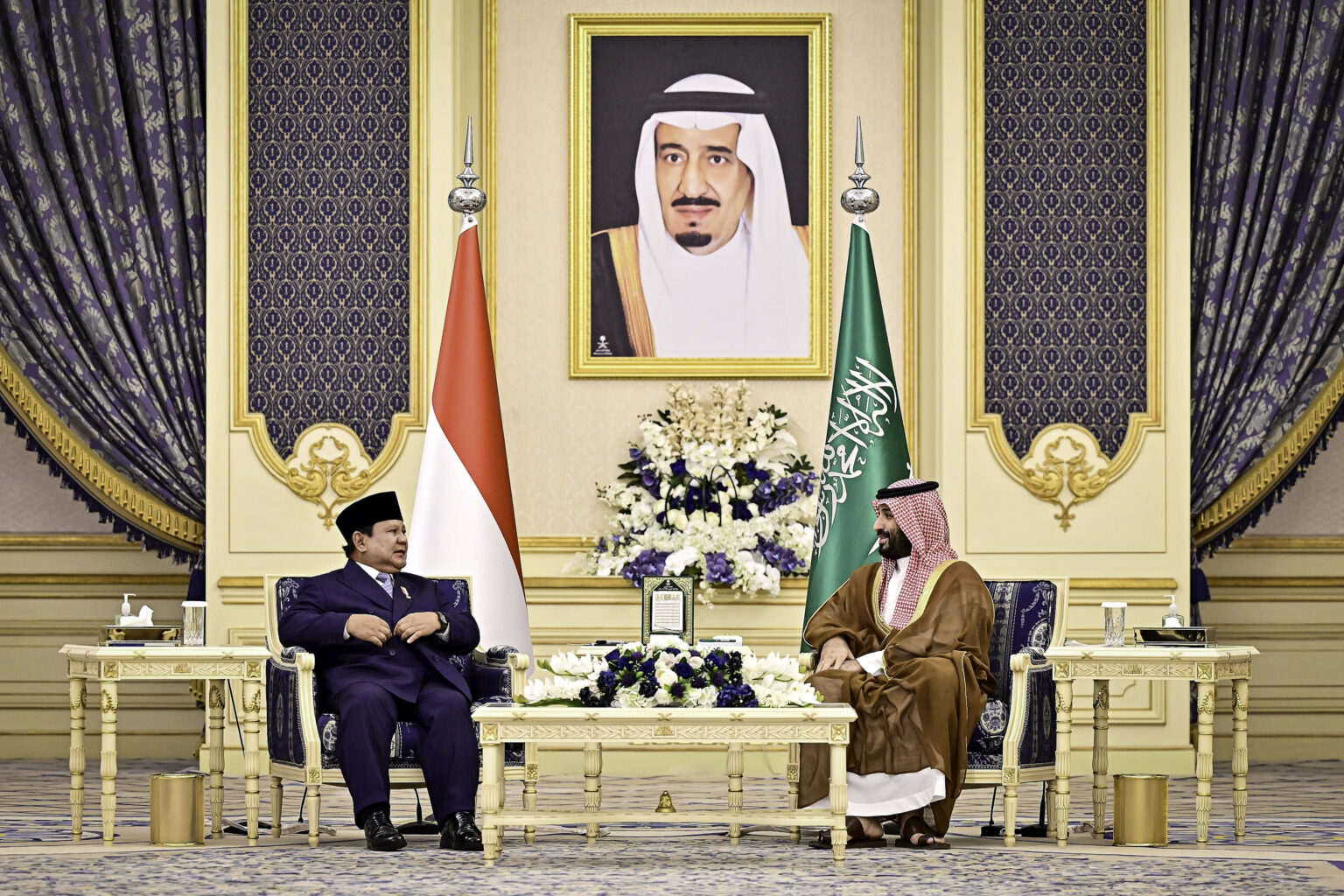
Indonesian President Prabowo Subianto with Saudi Crown Prince Mohammed bin Salman at the Royal State Palace, Jeddah.

- Indonesian President Sukarno visited Saudi Arabia in 1955.
- King Faisal of Saudi Arabia visited Indonesia on June 10 to 13, 1970.
- Indonesian President Joko Widodo visited Saudi Arabia on September 12, 2015. He would later visit the country again on May 21, 2017, to attend the Arab Islamic American Summit. Jokowi visited Saudi Arabia for his third time on April 14 to 15, 2019. In 2023, he visited the country two times.
- King Salman of Saudi Arabia visited Jakarta, Bogor, and Bali, Indonesia, on March 1, 2017.
- Crown Prince Mohammed bin Salman of Saudi Arabia visited Indonesia in April 2019.
- Indonesian President Prabowo Subianto visited Saudi Arabia in July 2025.

== See also ==
- Foreign relations of Indonesia
- Foreign relations of Saudi Arabia
- Capital punishment in Saudi Arabia
