= Morocco–Saudi Arabia relations =

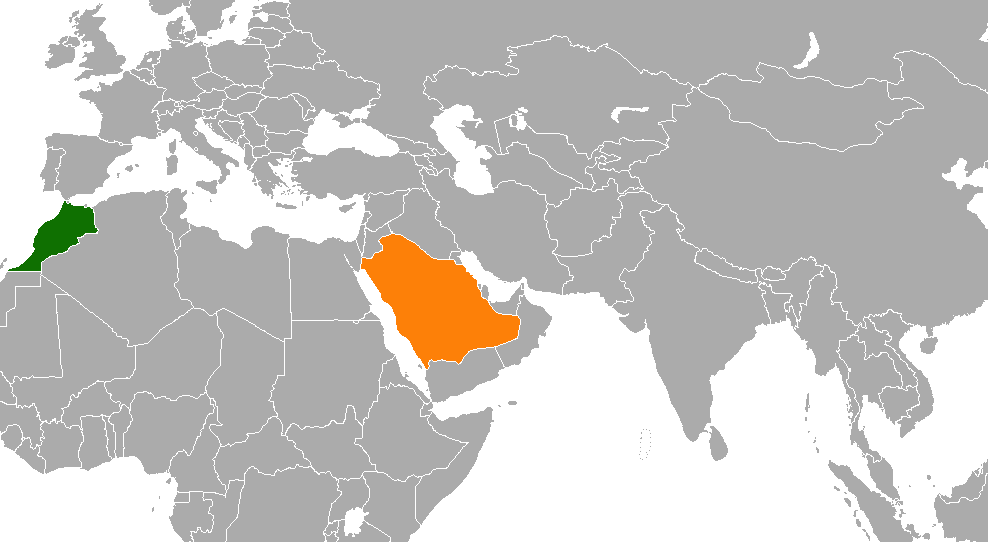
- Morocco: Saudi Arabia

Morocco–Saudi Arabia relations (Arabic: العلاقات السعودية المغربية) refers to the current and historical relations between the Kingdom of Morocco and Kingdom of Saudi Arabia. Morocco has an embassy in Riyadh and Saudi Arabia has an embassy in Rabat.

Both the two Arab nations have long and traditional friendly relations based on many historical commons. Both Morocco and Saudi Arabia are monarchies ruled by the respective families of the 'Alawis and the Al-Sauds, adhere to Sunni Islam, and their relationship is described as traditionally strong. Both the countries are members of the Arab League. The two countries then experienced hiatus in relations for a year, before the February 2019 Warsaw Conference once again stabilized the relations. In the past, both Morocco and Saudi Arabia led a campaign which successfully made the Arabic language an official language of the United Nations.

== History ==
Contact between the two sides goes back to a long time before the establishment of the first Saudi state, when the sultan of Morocco Ismail bin Sharif sent an important message to the Emir of Mecca Saad bin Zaid. When the reform movement of Sheikh Muhammad ibn Abd al-Wahhab appeared, a message arrived from the Hijaz to Fez to convey the call of Sheikh Ibn Abd al-Wahhab, and that was during the reign of Sultan Sulayman, who commissioned the scholars of the villagers to respond to the message, so he sent his son Ibrahim at the head of the delegation of pilgrims and scholars to respond to that message. The Moroccan sultan Sulayman was inspired by this Islamic revivalist movement and used his authority to condemn the use of music and dance in religious ceremonies, and banning pilgrimages to saintly shrines and religious festivals, even having the qubba over his father's grave removed in 1812, arguing that it was excessive ornamentation.

== Recent relations ==
=== Iran ===
Morocco and Saudi Arabia have together taken steps to curb Iranian influence in the Arab world. Morocco and Iran resumed diplomatic relations in 2015, however Morocco cut diplomatic ties with Iran on 1 May 2018 after it supported the separatist Polisario Front in the disputed Western Sahara militarily and financially against Morocco. Saudi Arabia is also cautious and hostile of Iran, especially with the Iran–Saudi Arabia proxy conflict.

In 2019, both Morocco and Saudi Arabia sent delegations to participate in the February 2019 Warsaw Conference. The conference saw both two nations once again stabilized the relationship to normal, with both denounced Iran together.

=== Western Sahara status ===
Saudi Arabia has typically supported Morocco over the dispute of Western Sahara and doesn't recognize the legitimacy of Sahrawi Arab Democratic Republic. It also supported Morocco by sending economic and military aid during the Western Sahara War (1975–1991). Saudi Arabia also helps fund several projects in the region with support from Moroccan authorities.

In February 2019, Morocco ended its involvement in the Saudi-led intervention in Yemen, with foreign minister Nasser Bourita citing "developments on the ground" in Yemen, "especially in regards to the humanitarian situation". Saudi state television network Al Arabiya later aired a documentary challenging the Moroccan claim to the Western Sahara. Morocco responded by recalling its ambassador to Saudi Arabia. However, ties between the two were enhanced after a few years.

=== Yemeni Civil War ===
During the current Yemeni Civil War, Morocco participated as part of the anti-Houthi coalition led by Saudi Arabia, with 6 warplanes and 1,500 troops, and ended its participation in February 2019.

=== Qatar crisis ===
Morocco has taken neutral stance in the conflict, hoping for a better resolution that would benefit Qatar and Saudi Arabia, the former having participated together with Morocco in the anti-Houthi campaign. Morocco even offered to act as a mediator to slow the tensions between the two Gulf Arab states.

Security cooperation

On October 25 and 26, 2026, in Riyadh, Abdellatif Hammouchi, Director General of Morocco's DGSN-DGST (National Security and Territorial Surveillance) agency, took part in the 52nd annual session of the Supreme Council of the Naif Arab University for Security Sciences (NAUSS), in his capacity as a member of the Council serving a second term, alongside the Secretary-General of the Council of Arab Interior Ministers and under the chairmanship of the Saudi Minister of Interior, Prince Abdulaziz bin Saud bin Naif Al Saud.

Beyond its focus on guiding police training and security policies across the Arab world, this visit carries significant diplomatic weight, reflecting Morocco's solidarity with Saudi Arabia in the face of regional security challenges. It also embodies the Moroccan royal doctrine that the security of the Gulf is a natural extension of Morocco's own security.

== Resident diplomatic missions ==
- Morocco has an embassy in Riyadh and consulate-general in Jeddah.
- Saudi Arabia has an embassy in Rabat.

== See also ==
- Foreign relations of Morocco
- Foreign relations of Saudi Arabia
