= Armenia–Saudi Arabia relations =

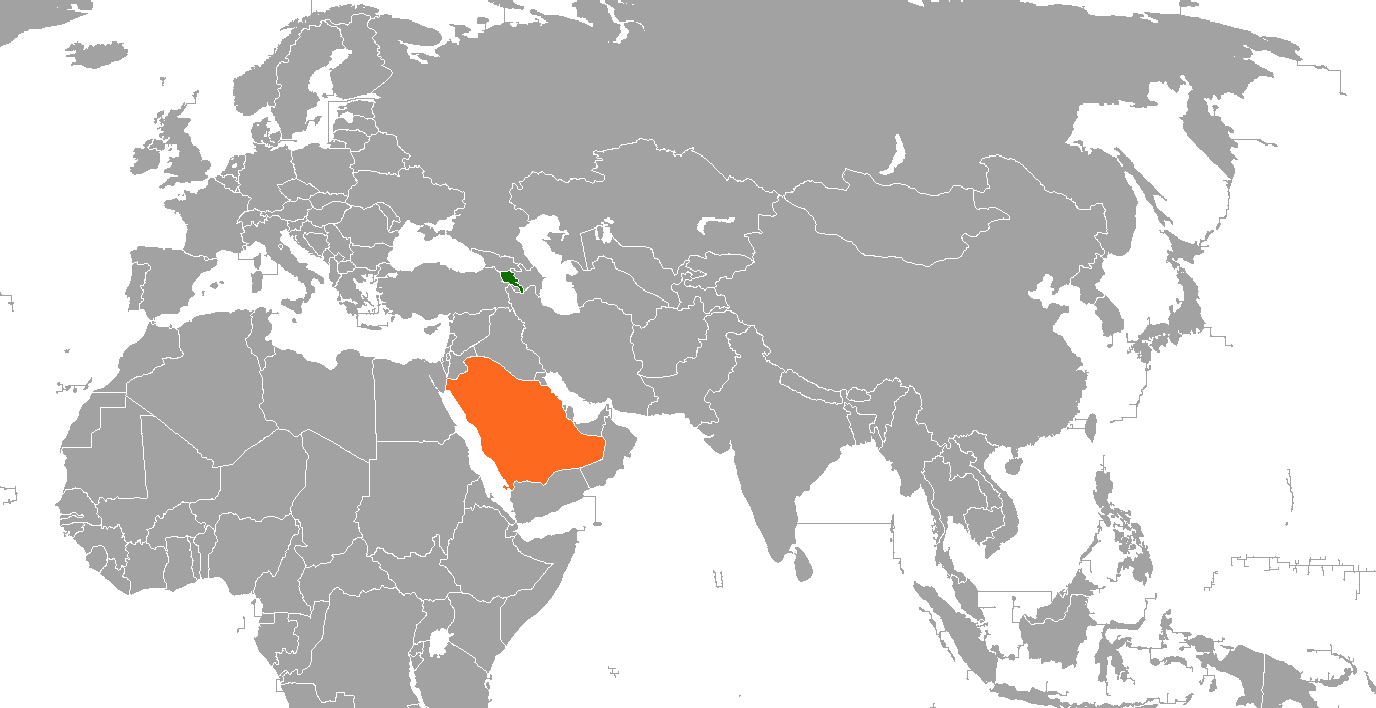

- Armenia: Saudi Arabia

Diplomatic relations between Armenia and Saudi Arabia were formalized on 25 November 2023. Prior to this, the relationship between the two countries has witnessed significant warming since the 2010s, possibly due to common opposition to increasing Turkish influence. Saudi Arabia is not among the countries that recognize the Armenian genocide.

== History ==
=== From 1990s to early 2010s ===
Due to the history of Nagorno-Karabakh conflict, in particular, the First Nagorno-Karabakh War that ended in 1994, Saudi Arabia and Armenia had no formal relations as Saudi Arabia has backed Azerbaijan's position in Nagorno-Karabakh.

=== Since mid-2010s ===
However, since the rise of Saudi Arabian Crown Prince Mohammad bin Salman and increasing hostility between Saudi Arabia and Turkey, the latter having poor relations with Armenia, the relationship between Saudi Arabia and Armenia has experienced a new level of improvement. Both Saudi Arabia and Armenia share a common sentiment on Turkish expansionism under Recep Tayyip Erdoğan as a threat to these nations, with Saudi Arabia recently launching an anti-Turkish boycott, started in 2019 and escalated since due to anti-Saudi remarks by the Turkish government; while Armenia has disputes with Turkey over the Armenian genocide and its alliance with Azerbaijan.

In 2019, Saudi Arabia agreed to sponsor a final solution to acknowledge the Armenian genocide in the United States Congress. Saudi Ambassador to the US Princess Reema bint Bandar Al Saud, in her statement, condemned Turkey for its hypocrisies and refusal to acknowledge the genocide. Saudi Arabian ambassador in Lebanon had also paid a visit to Armenian Genocide memorial to demonstrate Saudi solidarity to Armenia.

In September 2018, despite the two countries not having established official relations, Saudi Crown Prince Mohammed bin Salman and Saudi King Salman congratulated Armenia on its independence day, which was considered as a breakthrough. On October 26, 2021, Armenian President Armen Sarkissian arrived in Riyadh, Saudi Arabia on a visit described by the Armenian presidency as historic, the first of its kind for the leaders of the two countries. The President participated in the Future Investment Initiative forum, where he sat next to Crown Prince Mohammed bin Salman.

In addition, during the 2020 Nagorno-Karabakh war, Saudi Arabia, alongside the United Arab Emirates, was thought to be secretly backing Armenia against Azerbaijan. Saudi channel Al Arabiya hosted a special speech delivered by Armenian President Armen Sargsyan condemning Turkey and Azerbaijan and urged international community to prevent Turkey and Azerbaijan from intervening in the conflict together.

On the other hand, Saudi Arabia has sought to refrain from making direct support for Armenia, instead urging two parties (Armenia and Azerbaijan) to solve the problem, largely due to Saudi Arabia seeing Azerbaijan as a potential partner against Iran even though Saudi Arabia is increasingly hostile to Azerbaijan's ally Turkey.

Armenia and Saudi Arabia officially established diplomatic relations on 25 November 2023, during a signing ceremony held in Abu Dhabi, United Arab Emirates.

=== Armenian genocide recognition ===
Historically, Saudi Arabia had backed Turkey over the Armenian genocide and was one of the few countries in the world to not acknowledge the independence of Armenia; Saudi Arabia also sided with Azerbaijan, the main ally of Turkey, over the Nagorno-Karabakh conflict. However, increasing tensions between Saudi Arabia and Turkey have resulted in Saudi Arabia slowly paying attention to the Armenian genocide, with government-run newspapers starting to mention the Armenian genocide, and anti-Turkish boycotts on the rise in the Saudi Kingdom as well.

In April 2019, Saudi Arabia supported an American Congressional resolution to recognize the Armenian genocide. The Saudi Arabian ambassador in Lebanon had also paid a visit to the Armenian Genocide Memorial to demonstrate Saudi solidarity to Armenia. During the 2020 Nagorno-Karabakh conflict, Saudi Arabia had called for a boycott of Turkish goods after Turkish president Erdoğan blamed Saudi Arabia for the tensions in the Caucasus and the Middle East.

On the other hand, however, Saudi Arabia also needs to have leverage on relations with Azerbaijan, as Saudi Arabia has seen Azerbaijan as a potential place to destabilize Iran, an ally of Armenia but also Turkey and Saudi Arabia's adversary, thus Saudi Arabia takes its action carefully, although Saudi opposition to Turkey has soared.

== High-level visits ==
=== To Saudi Arabia ===
N	Date	Position	Type
1	17–18 April 2024	Minister of Foreign Affairs of Armenia Ararat Mirzoyan	Official

== Diplomatic missions ==
- Armenia is accredited to Saudi Arabia from its embassy in Abu Dhabi, United Arab Emirates.
- Saudi Arabia is accredited to Armenia from its embassy in Tbilisi, Georgia.

== See also ==
- Foreign relations of Armenia
- Foreign relations of Saudi Arabia
