= Saudi Arabia–Spain relations =

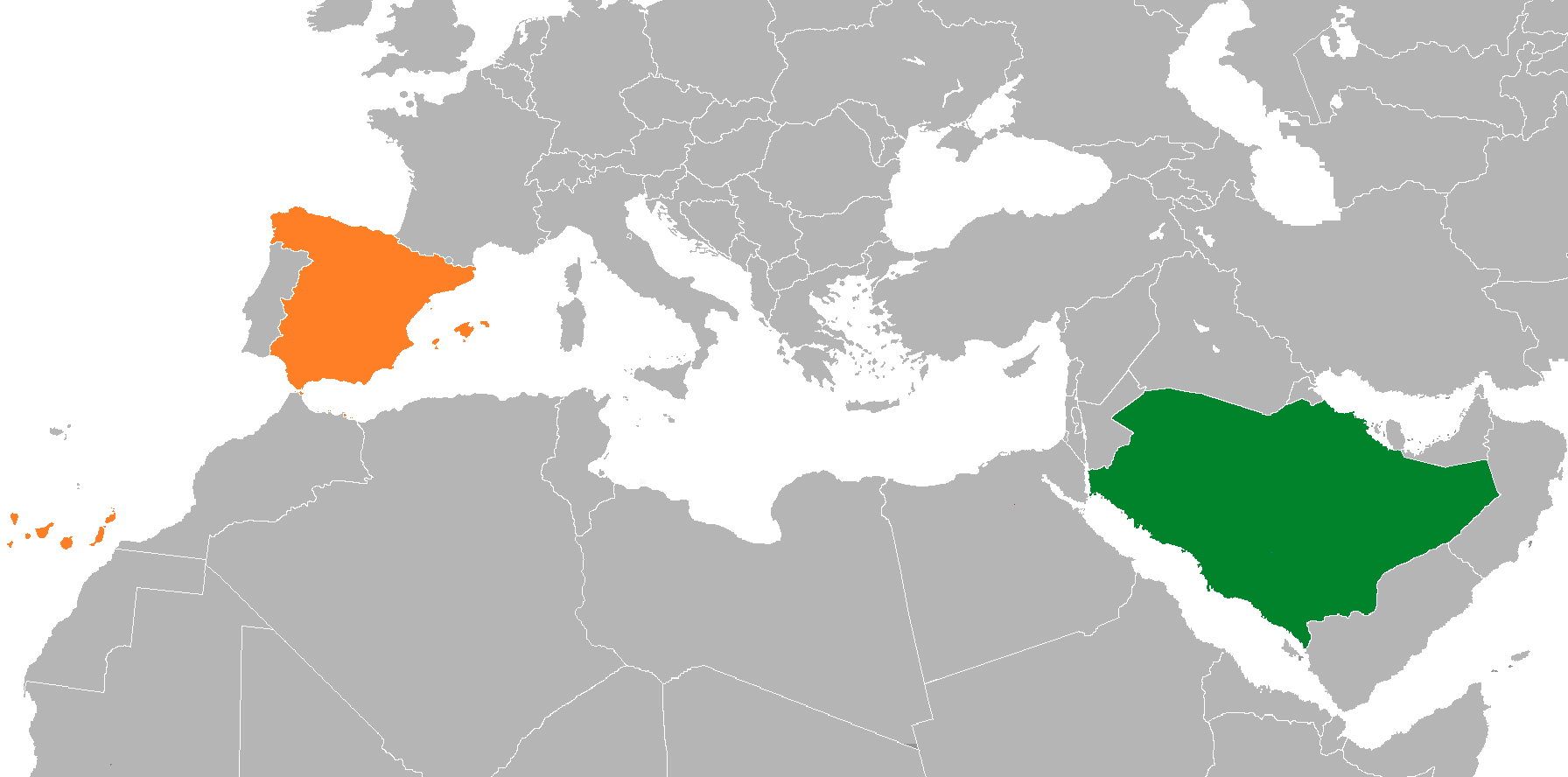
- Spain: Saudi Arabia

Diplomatic mission
- Spanish embassy, Riyadh: Saudi Arabia embassy, Madrid

Saudi Arabia–Spain relations are the bilateral and diplomatic relations between The Kingdom of Spain and The Kingdom of Saudi Arabia. Saudi Arabia has an embassy in Madrid and a consulate general in Málaga. Spain has an embassy in Riyadh. Both countries maintain a good relationship, with both of the countries being kingdoms.

== Diplomatic relations ==
It is also worth highlighting the importance of Saudi tourism in Spain, as a vehicle for rapprochement between the two societies. This is a quality tourism, with high-income people who have followed the example of King Fahd and other members of the Royal Family such as Prince Salman, Governor of Riyadh. On the occasion of the aforementioned royal visit (April 2006) an agreement was signed to institutionalize political contacts.

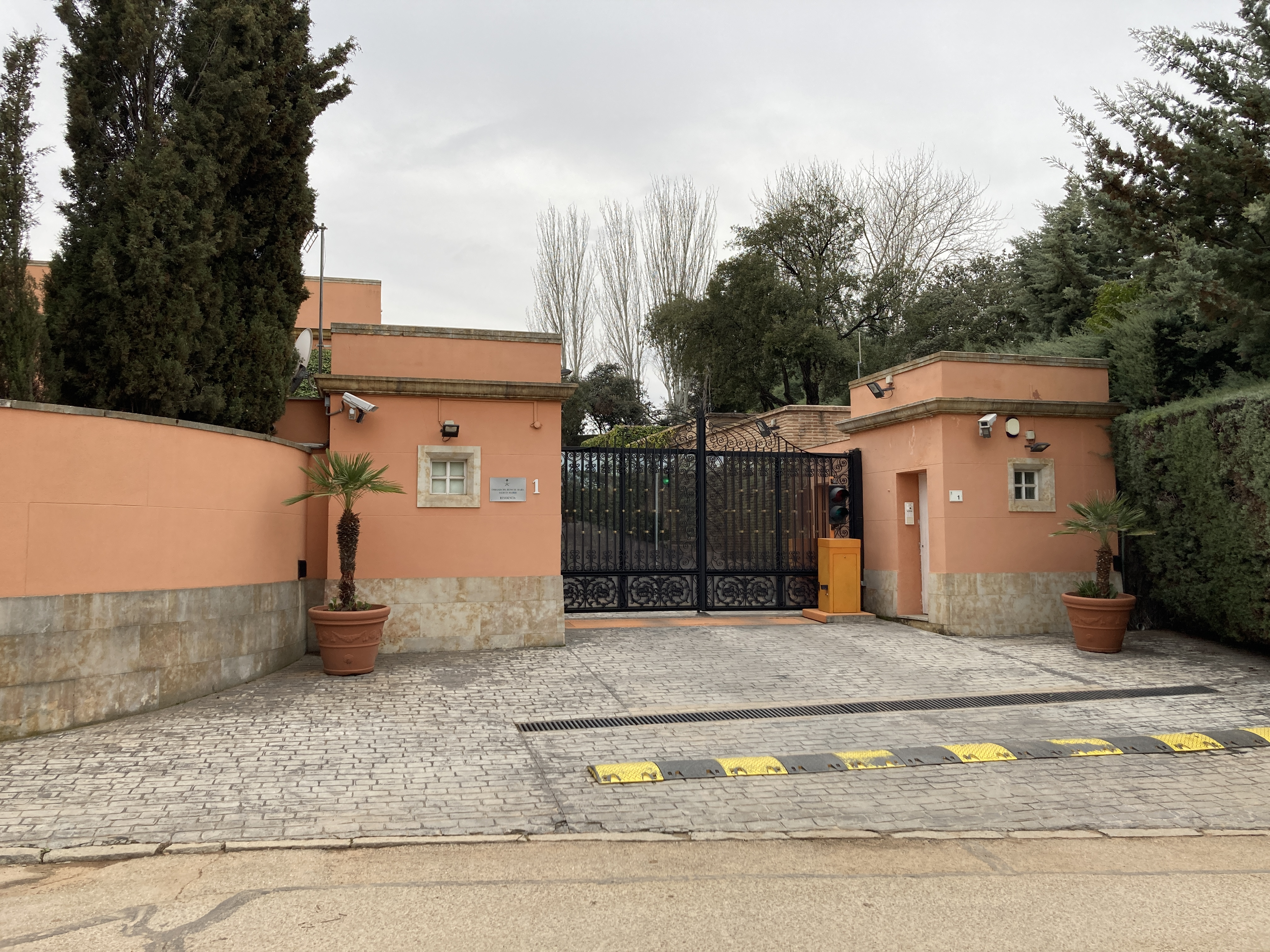
Residence of the ambassador of Saudi Arabia in Alcobendas

== Economic relations ==
The recent award of the High Speed Mecca - Jeddah - Medina project to the Hispanic-Saudi consortium Al Shoula Group, participated by a series of public and private Spanish companies such as Renfe, ADIF, Talgo, OHL, COPASA, COBRA, CONSULTRANS, IMATHIA, INABENSA and GINOVART, DI- METRONIC and INDRA, in October 2011, amounted to 7,000 million euro.

The contract, signed in Riyadh, in January 2012, involves the design, construction, operation and maintenance of the line and trains over a period of twelve years. The line will be 450 km long and will serve more than 160,000 pilgrims a day.

Good economic relations between the two countries, in particular the sale of weapons, has generated criticism due to the extremely conservative nature of Saudi Arabia and its involvement in wars in countries of the Arab environment such as Yemeni Civil War.

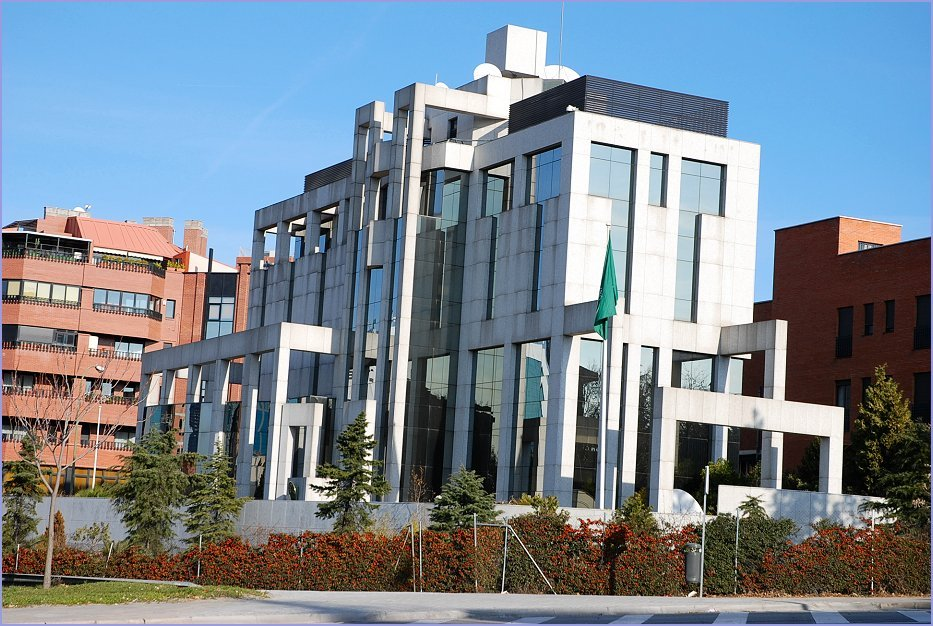
Embassy of Saudi Arabia in Madrid

== See also ==
- Foreign relations of Saudi Arabia
- Foreign relations of Spain
