= Foreign relations of Saudi Arabia =

Foreign relations of Saudi Arabia are the diplomatic and trade relations between Saudi Arabia and other countries around the world. The foreign policy of Saudi Arabia is focused on co-operation with the oil-exporting Gulf States, the unity of the Arab World, Islamic solidarity, and support for the United Nations. In practice, the main concerns in recent years have been relations with the US, the Saudi Arabian–led intervention in Yemen, the Israeli–Palestinian conflict, Iraq, the perceived threat from the Islamic Republic of Iran, and the effect of oil pricing. Saudi Arabia contributes large amounts of development aid to Muslim countries. From 1986 to 2006, the country donated £49 billion in aid.

Although a member of the Non-Aligned Movement, Saudi Arabia is described as leading the "Pro-Western Camp" of Arab countries, aligned with the U.S. and composed of Egypt, Jordan, and Arab states of the Persian Gulf. Saudi Arabia and the United States are close strategic allies and partners. However, the relationship witnessed certain decline during the last years of the Obama administration, but strengthened following the election of President Donald Trump who forged close ties with the Saudi royal family. Sunni Islam is the main religion of Saudis. China and Saudi Arabia are major allies, with the relationship between the two countries growing significantly in recent decades. A majority of Saudi Arabians have expressed a favorable view of China.

As a founding member of OPEC, Saudi Arabia's long-term oil pricing policy has been to keep prices stable and moderate—high enough to earn large amounts of revenue, but not so high as to encourage alternative energy sources among oil importers, or jeopardise the economies of Western countries where many of its financial assets are located and which provide political and military support for the Saudi government. The major exception to this occurred during the 1973 oil crisis when Saudi Arabia, with the other Arab oil states, used an embargo on oil supplies to pressure the US to stop supporting Israel.

Saudi Arabia is a founding member of several multinational organizations, including OPEC, the United Nations, the Arab League. It is also a founding member of the Gulf Cooperation Council, Muslim World League, the Organisation of Islamic Cooperation, and the Islamic Development Bank—all of which are headquartered in Saudi. The country plays a prominent role in the International Monetary Fund, the World Bank, and in 2005 joined the World Trade Organization.

According to a UCLA professor James L. Gelvin, Saudi Arabia recently has become much more active in terms of foreign and security policy because of the Arab Spring, the policies of the Obama administration and the mid-2010s collapse of oil prices.

== History ==
The history of the Kingdom of Saudi Arabia goes back to several centuries. After World War II (1939–1945) and during the Cold War (1945–1992), Saudi Arabia maintained an anti-Communist, anti-secular Arab-nationalist policy, often working with the leading anti-communist power, the United States. Following the 1973 oil crisis, when Saudi Arabia and other Arab oil exporters embargoed the United States and its allies for their support of Israel, oil revenues increased dramatically, and the Kingdom worked to become the leading Islamic state, spending generously to advance Islam and particularly its conservative school (known as Wahhabism). Supporters see this as having purified and unified the Islamic faith; other commentators claim it has eroded regional Islamic cultures. (Examples of the acculturizing effect of Saudi aid can be seen among the Minangkabau and the Acehnese in Indonesia, as well as among the people of the Maldives. The Wahhabi form of Islam is also perceived in the West as a source of Islamist extremism.

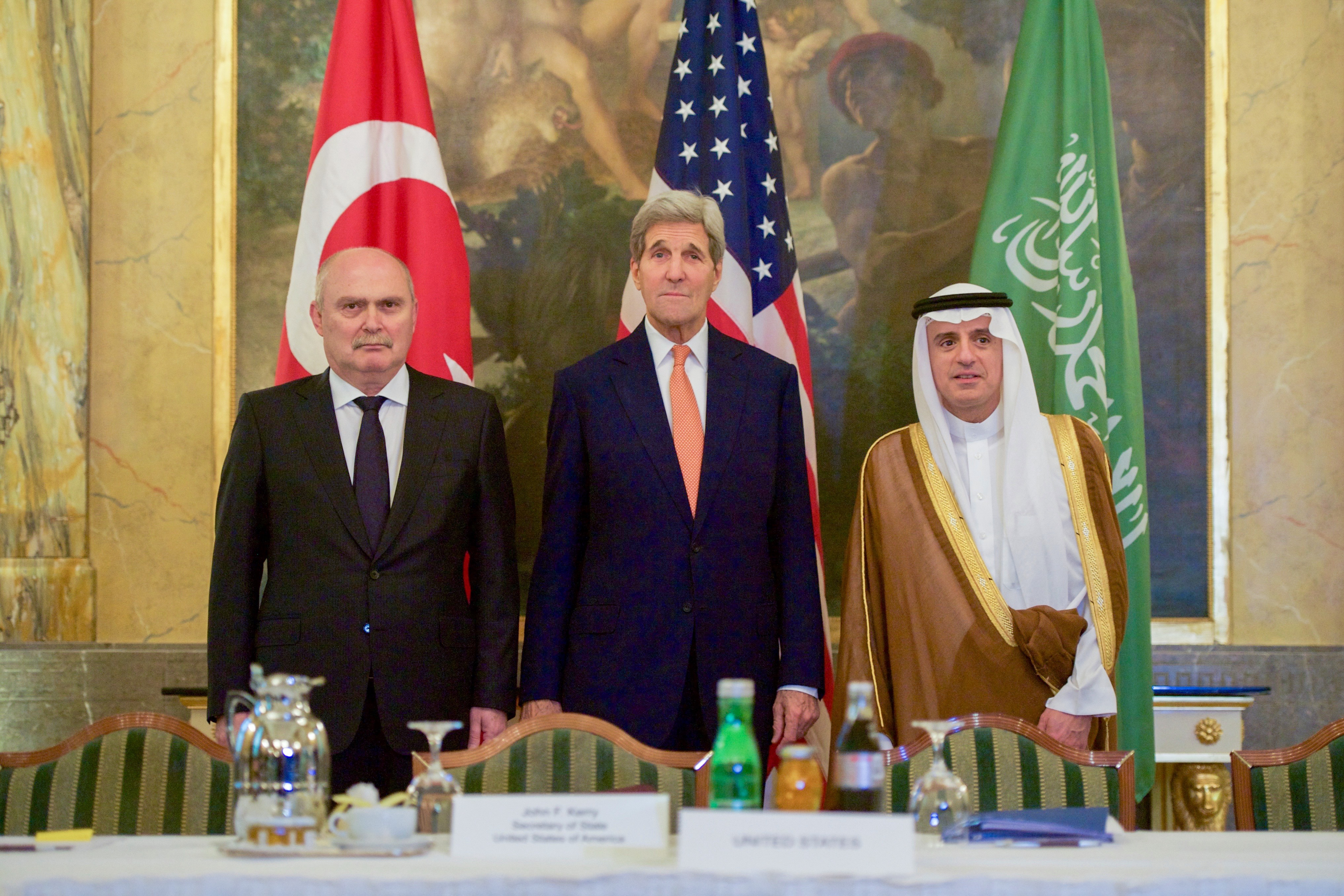
Saudi Foreign Minister Adel al-Jubeir, meets With Turkish Foreign Minister Feridun Sinirlioğlu and US Secretary of State John Kerry in 2015

Saudi Arabia and its oil policy were significant factors in the proxy wars of the Cold War prior to the downfall of Soviet Communism in the late 1980s and early 1990s. Saudi Arabia helped to finance not just the Afghan Mujahideen but also non-Muslim anti-communists. It also seriously harmed the Soviet Communist cause by stabilizing oil prices "throughout the 1980s, just when the Russians were desperate to sell energy in order to keep up with huge hikes in American military spending."

Following King Fahd's stroke in 1995, Abdullah, then Crown Prince, assumed responsibility for foreign policy. A marked change in U.S.-Saudi relations occurred, as Abdullah sought to put distance between his policies and the unpopular pro-Western policies of King Fahd. Abdullah took a more independent line from the US and concentrated on improving regional relations, particularly with Iran. Several long-standing border disputes were resolved, including significantly reshaping the Saudi border with Yemen. The new approach resulted in increasingly strained relations with the US. Despite this, the U.S. and Saudi Arabia remained close. In 1998 Abdullah paid a state visit to Washington and met with U.S. President Bill Clinton.

In 2003 Abdullah's new policy was reflected in the Saudi government's refusal to support or to participate in the U.S.-led invasion of Iraq. Some US critics saw this as an attempt by the Saudi royal family to placate the kingdom's Islamist radicals. That same year Saudi and U.S. government officials agreed to the withdrawal of all U.S. military forces from Saudi soil. After ascending the throne, King Abdullah (r. 2005–2015) followed a more activist foreign policy and continued to push-back on US policies which were unpopular in Saudi Arabia (for example, refusing to provide material assistance to support the new Iraqi government). However, increasingly, in common with the US, fear and mistrust of Iran became a significant factor in Saudi policy. In 2010 leaked diplomatic cableds revealed that King Abdullah had urged the U.S. to attack Iran in order to "cut off the head of the snake". Saudi Arabia has long since used its alliance with the United States as a counterbalance to Iran's influence in the Middle East, and Saudi Arabia and other Arab states of the Persian Gulf have looked to the United States for protection against Iran.

Relations with the US and other Western countries became further strained by the fact that Saudi Arabia has been a source of Islamist terrorist activity world-wide. Osama bin Laden and 15 out of the 19 September 11 attacks hijackers were Saudi nationals, though some officials argue that bin Laden planned this deliberately in an attempt to strain U.S.-Saudi relations, and former Central Intelligence Agency director James Woolsey described Saudi Arabian Wahhabism as "the soil in which al-Qaeda and its sister terrorist organizations are flourishing". Some in the U.S. Government also believe that the royal family, through its long and close relations with Wahhabi clerics, had laid the groundwork for the growth of militant groups like al-Qaeda, and that after the attacks had done little to help track the militants or prevent future atrocities.

As announced at the 2009 Arab League summit, Saudi Arabia had intended to participate in the Arab Customs Union to be established in 2015 and in an Arab common market to be established by 2020.

Following the wave of early-2011 protests and revolutions affecting the Arab world, Saudi Arabia offered asylum to deposed President Zine El Abidine Ben Ali of Tunisia, and King Abdullah telephoned President Hosni Mubarak of Egypt (prior to Mubarak's deposition) to offer his support.

Saudi military forces and their allies became involved in conflict in Yemen (on Saudi Arabia's southern borders) from March 2015 onwards.

== Religion ==
=== Islamist exportation ===
According to the FFGI at Goethe University Frankfurt, Wahhabism is spread globally with organizations closely associated with the government of Saudi Arabia such as the Muslim World League (WML) and the World Association of Muslim Youth are actively participating.

Between the mid-1970s and 2002, Saudi Arabia expended over $70 billion in "overseas development aid". However, there is evidence that the vast majority was, in fact, spent on propagating and extending the influence of Wahhabism at the expense of other forms of Islam. According to the government-associated paper Ain Al-Yaqeen article in 2002, Saudi government-sponsored projects were active in non-Muslim countries in Europe, North and South America, Africa, Australia and Asia. These encompassed 210 Islamic centers which were completely or partly funded by the Saudi kingdom, 1500 mosques, 202 colleges and almost 2000 schools. The House of Saud has inaugurated 1359 mosques in Europe.

In 2025, Burkina Faso's President Ibrahim Traoré turned down Saudi Arabia's offer to construct 200 mosques in his country, stating that Burkina Faso already has enough mosques. Instead, he requested that Saudi Arabia invest in infrastructure projects such as schools, hospitals, and job-creating businesses, which are more crucial for the nation's development and long-term sustainability.

=== Other relations ===
In February 2019, Saudi Arabia's Crown prince Mohammad bin Salman defended Xinjiang re-education camps for Muslims, saying "China has the right to carry out anti-terrorism and de-extermination work for its national security." China has allegedly imprisoned up to 2 million Muslims in concentration camps, where they are subject to abuse and torture.

== Diplomatic relations ==
List of countries which Saudi Arabia maintains diplomatic relations with:

#	Country	Date
1	Russia	19 February 1926
2	France	March 1926
3	Greece	1926
4	United Kingdom	20 May 1927
5	Turkey	3 August 1929
6	Iran	24 August 1929
7	Netherlands	9 June 1930
8	Iraq	7 April 1931
9	Italy	10 February 1932
10	Afghanistan	5 May 1932
11	Egypt	7 May 1936
12	United States	4 February 1940
13	Lebanon	9 April 1944
14	Syria	26 June 1944
15	Chile	6 September 1945
16	Argentina	16 February 1946
17	India	15 August 1947
18	Pakistan	September 1947
19	Jordan	12 August 1948
20	Spain	30 August 1948
21	Ethiopia	25 May 1949
22	Indonesia	1 May 1950
23	Mexico	12 September 1952
24	Venezuela	1952
25	Germany	10 November 1954
26	Belgium	10 April 1955
27	Japan	7 June 1955
28	Cuba	10 February 1956
29	Tunisia	June 1956
30	Sudan	14 October 1956
31	Switzerland	29 November 1956
32	Libya	1956
33	Morocco	1956
34	Yemen	21 June 1957
35	Sweden	28 June 1957
36	Austria	10 September 1957
37	Thailand	1 October 1957
38	Malaysia	1957
39	Ghana	30 March 1960
40	Senegal	22 January 1961
41	Norway	8 May 1961
42	Guinea	15 May 1961
43	Nigeria	21 August 1961
44	Kuwait	5 October 1961
45	Cyprus	1961
46	Denmark	1 February 1962
47	South Korea	16 October 1962
48	Somalia	29 October 1962
49	Mali	1962
50	Algeria	August 1963
51	Cameroon	6 October 1966
52	Niger	20 November 1966
53	Brazil	23 December 1968
54	Kenya	12 May 1969
55	Finland	6 June 1969
56	Philippines	24 October 1969
57	Mauritania	22 March 1970
58	Bahrain	29 September 1971
59	Qatar	12 October 1971
60	Oman	14 December 1971
61	Uganda	26 June 1972
62	Sierra Leone	1 July 1972
63	Chad	20 November 1972
64	Canada	8 May 1973
65	Democratic Republic of the Congo	13 September 1973
66	Australia	15 January 1974
67	Gabon	January 1974
68	Liberia	30 March 1974
69	Gambia	9 May 1974
70	Trinidad and Tobago	5 July 1974
71	Uruguay	9 July 1974
72	Burundi	15 July 1974
73	United Arab Emirates	21 August 1974
74	Ireland	September 1974
75	Sri Lanka	30 November 1974
76	Malta	1 September 1975
77	Bangladesh	17 November 1975
78	Jamaica	15 August 1976
79	New Zealand	22 December 1976
80	Nepal	15 March 1977
81	Singapore	10 November 1977
82	Djibouti	14 December 1977
83	Luxembourg	10 December 1977
84	Zambia	1 May 1978
85	Mauritius	7 August 1978
86	Burkina Faso	25 March 1980
87	Portugal	18 June 1980
88	Maldives	17 March 1981
89	Iceland	15 January 1982
90	Guinea-Bissau	1983
91	Tanzania	11 April 1984
92	Comoros	1984
93	Ivory Coast	10 January 1985
94	Peru	19 March 1986
95	Brunei	1 July 1987
—	State of Palestine	1 January 1989
96	Laos	29 May 1990
97	China	21 July 1990
98	Uzbekistan	20 February 1992
99	Tajikistan	22 February 1992
100	Turkmenistan	22 February 1992
101	Azerbaijan	24 February 1992
102	Bosnia and Herzegovina	17 April 1992
103	Kyrgyzstan	19 October 1992
104	Albania	2 December 1992
105	Ukraine	14 April 1993
106	Eritrea	2 October 1993
107	Kazakhstan	30 April 1994
108	Georgia	27 May 1994
109	South Africa	29 October 1994
110	North Macedonia	11 January 1995
111	Romania	13 March 1995
112	Bulgaria	20 March 1995
113	Hungary	18 April 1995
114	Poland	3 May 1995
115	Slovenia	7 June 1995
116	Croatia	8 June 1995
117	Slovakia	16 June 1995
118	Czech Republic	1995
119	Moldova	17 July 1996
120	Mozambique	1996
121	Belarus	6 June 1997
122	Republic of the Congo	1 February 1999
123	Suriname	24 February 1999
124	Malawi	15 August 1999
125	Vietnam	21 October 1999
126	Honduras	28 September 2000
127	Seychelles	28 September 2000
128	Bolivia	17 October 2000
129	Haiti	17 November 2000
130	Saint Lucia	2000
131	Estonia	21 March 2003
132	Latvia	21 March 2003
133	Benin	25 June 2004
134	Myanmar	25 August 2004
135	Lithuania	31 October 2005
136	Nicaragua	30 March 2006
137	Antigua and Barbuda	12 February 2007
138	Mongolia	12 February 2007
139	Botswana	1 March 2007
140	Cape Verde	14 March 2007
141	Barbados	17 December 2007
142	Togo	26 December 2007
143	Madagascar	22 October 2008
144	Dominica	23 January 2009
145	Ecuador	23 January 2009
146	El Salvador	27 February 2009
147	Andorra	19 March 2009
148	Angola	24 March 2009
149	San Marino	31 March 2009
150	Liechtenstein	29 April 2009
151	Paraguay	9 July 2009
—	Kosovo	7 August 2009
152	Cambodia	19 October 2010
153	Colombia	8 September 2011
154	Montenegro	16 September 2011
155	Equatorial Guinea	12 October 2011
156	Guyana	22 February 2012
157	Dominican Republic	24 July 2012
158	Serbia	17 April 2013
159	South Sudan	3 December 2013
160	Solomon Islands	17 July 2014
161	Panama	14 January 2015
162	Timor-Leste	29 January 2015
163	Tuvalu	26 March 2015
164	Eswatini	30 March 2015
165	Namibia	29 July 2015
166	Fiji	4 August 2015
167	Costa Rica	7 December 2015
168	Saint Kitts and Nevis	29 September 2016
169	Guatemala	21 April 2017
170	Central African Republic	16 June 2017
171	Rwanda	29 March 2018
172	Zimbabwe	3 December 2020
173	Tonga	14 December 2020
174	Lesotho	20 August 2021
175	Vanuatu	8 August 2022
176	Belize	24 September 2022
177	Bahamas	23 November 2022
178	Palau	23 November 2022
179	Monaco	2 March 2023
—	Cook Islands	12 April 2023
180	São Tomé and Príncipe	7 June 2023
181	Saint Vincent and the Grenadines	11 October 2023
182	Federated States of Micronesia	7 November 2023
183	Nauru	7 November 2023
184	Armenia	25 November 2023
185	Kiribati	19 December 2023
186	Grenada	2023
187	Samoa	23 May 2024
188	Marshall Islands	5 September 2024
189	Bhutan	18 September 2024

== Bilateral relations ==
=== Africa ===
Country	Formal Relations Began	Notes
Algeria		See Algeria–Saudi Arabia relations: Algeria has an embassy in Riyadh and a consulate-general in Jeddah.; Saudi Arabia has an embassy in Algiers.
Chad		Chad has an embassy in Riyadh.; Saudi Arabia has an embassy in N'Djamena.
Egypt	7 May 1936	See Egypt–Saudi Arabia relations: Egypt has an embassy in Riyadh and a consulate-general in Jeddah.; Saudi Arabia has an embassy in Cairo.
Ethiopia	25 May 1949	Both countries established diplomatic relations on 25 May 1949 when Minister of Ethiopia to Saudi Arabia (Resident in Cairo) Mr. Taffassa Hapte Mikael presented his credentials.: Ethiopia has an embassy in Riyadh and a consulate-general in Jeddah.; Saudi Arabia has an embassy in Addis Ababa.
Kenya	12 May 1969	See Kenya–Saudi Arabia relations Both countries established diplomatic relations on 12 May 1969 when Kenya's Ambassador to Saudi Arabia, Japheth Kimanzi Ilako, has presented his credentials to King Faisal.: Kenya has an embassy in Riyadh.; Saudi Arabia has an embassy in Nairobi.
Libya		See Libya–Saudi Arabia relations: Libya has an embassy in Riyadh and a consulate-general in Jeddah.; Saudi Arabia has an embassy in Tripoli.
Morocco		See Morocco–Saudi Arabia relations: Morocco has an embassy in Riyadh and a consulate-general in Jeddah.; Saudi Arabia has an embassy in Rabat.
Senegal		See Saudi Arabia–Senegal relations: Saudi Arabia has an embassy in Dakar.; Senegal has an embassy in Riyadh and a consulate-general in Jeddah.
South Africa		See Saudi Arabia–South Africa relations: Saudi Arabia has an embassy in Pretoria.; South Africa has an embassy in Riyadh and a consulate-general in Jeddah.
South Sudan		Saudi Arabia has an embassy in Kampala whose consular areas also covers South Sudan.; South Sudan has an embassy in Riyadh.
Sudan	14 October 1956	See Saudi Arabia–Sudan relations Both countries established diplomatic relations on 14 October 1956 when Minister of the Republic of Sudan to Saudi Arabia, Sayyid Mahjoub Maccawi, presented his credentials to King Saud.: Saudi Arabia has an embassy in Khartoum.; Sudan has an embassy in Riyadh and a consulate-general in Jeddah.
Tanzania		See Saudi Arabia–Tanzania relations: Saudi Arabia has an embassy in Dar es Salaam.; Tanzania has an embassy in Riyadh.
Tunisia		See Saudi Arabia–Tunisia relations: Saudi Arabia has an embassy in Tunis.; Tunisia has an embassy in Riyadh and a consulate-general in Jeddah.

=== Americas ===
Country	Formal Relations Began	Notes
Brazil		See Brazil–Saudi Arabia relations: Brazil has an embassy in Riyadh.; Saudi Arabia has an embassy in Brasília.
Canada		See Canada–Saudi Arabia relations: Canada has an embassy in Riyadh.; Saudi Arabia has an embassy in Ottawa.; See also: Arab Canadians
Mexico	12 September 1952	See Mexico–Saudi Arabia relations: Mexico and Saudi Arabia established diplomatic relations on 12 September 1952.; Mexico has an embassy in Riyadh.; Saudi Arabia has an embassy in Mexico City.; See also: Islam in Mexico
Peru		Main article: Peru–Saudi Arabia relations: Peru has an embassy in Riyadh.; Saudi Arabia has an embassy in Lima.
United States	4 February 1940	See Saudi Arabia-United States relations Further information: Saudi Arabia lobby in the United States and 2017 United States–Saudi Arabia arms deal King Ibn Saud converses with President Franklin D. Roosevelt on board the USS Quincy, after the Yalta Conference in 1945. A pro-Palestine demonstration in front of the Saudi Arabia Consulate General building in West Los Angeles United States recognized the government of King Ibn Saud in 1931. In the 1930s, oil exploration by Standard Oil commenced. The United States and Saudi Arabia established full diplomatic relations on 4 February 1940, when U.S. envoy Bert Fish presented his diplomatic credentials.There was no US ambassador resident in Saudi Arabia until 1943, but as World War II progressed, the United States began to believe that Saudi oil was of strategic importance. King Ibn Saud met with the U.S. President Franklin Delano Roosevelt on 14 February 1945 in a meeting which lasted three days. The meeting took place on board the USS Quincy at the Great Bitter Lake in the Suez Canal. The meeting laid down the basis of the future relations between two countries. In 1951, under a mutual defence agreement, the U.S. established a permanent U.S. Military Training Mission in the kingdom and agreed to provide training support in the use of weapons and other security-related services to the Saudi armed forces. This agreement formed the basis of what grew into a longstanding security relationship. The United States is one of Saudi Arabia's largest trading partners and closest allies and has had full diplomatic relations since 1933 and they remain strong today. However, Saudi Arabia's relationship with the United States has been put under pressure since late 2013 following the United States backing down from its intervention in the Syrian Civil War and the United States thawing relations with Iran. The international abduction of American children to Saudi Arabia provoked sustained criticism and resulted in a Congressional hearing in 2002 where parents of children held in Saudi Arabia gave impassioned testimony related to the abduction of their children. Washington based Insight magazine ran a series of articles on international abduction during the same period highlighting Saudi Arabia a number of times Relations between the U.S. and Saudi Arabia were strained after the September 11 attacks in 2001, when nineteen men affiliated with al-Qaeda, including 15 Saudi nationals, hijacked four commercial passenger jet airliners, crashing two of the planes into the Twin Towers of the World Trade Center in New York City, killing 2,973. Saudi Arabia issued a statement on the day of the terrorist attacks on America's World Trade Center and Pentagon, calling them "regrettable and inhuman." Saudi recognition of the Taliban stopped and as of mid-November 2001, the Bush administration continued to publicly praise Saudi support for the war on terrorism. However, published media reports have indicated U.S. frustration with Saudi inaction. Although 15 of the 19 hijackers were Saudi nationals, publicly the Saudis were not cooperating with Americans who wanted to look at background files of the hijackers or to interview the hijackers' families. Secretary of State Hillary Clinton meets with King Abdullah of Saudi Arabia, Riyadh, 2012 In his first formal television interview as U.S. President, Barack Obama addressed the Muslim world through an Arabic-language satellite TV network Al-Arabiya. He expressed interest and a commitment to repair relations that have continued to deteriorate under the previous administration. The American envoy to the region is former Sen. George J. Mitchell. On 20 October 2010, U.S. State Department notified Congress of its intention to make the biggest arms sale in American history – an estimated $60.5 billion purchase by the Kingdom of Saudi Arabia. The package represents a considerable improvement in the offensive capability of the Saudi armed forces. The U.S. was keen to point out that the arms transfer would increase "interoperability" with U.S. forces. In the 1990–1991 Gulf War, having U.S.-trained Saudi forces, along with military installations built to U.S. specifications, allowed the American armed forces to deploy in a comfortable and familiar battle environment. This new deal would increase these capabilities, as an advanced American military infrastructure is about to be built.: Saudi Arabia has an embassy in Washington, D.C., and consulates-general in Houston, Los Angeles and New York City.; United States has an embassy in Riyadh and consulates-general in Dhahran and Jeddah.; See also: United States withdrawal from Saudi Arabia

=== Asia ===
Country	Formal Relations Began	Notes
Afghanistan	5 May 1932	See Afghanistan-Saudi Arabia relations: Afghanistan has an embassy in Riyadh and a consulate-general in Jeddah.; Saudi Arabia has an embassy in Kabul.
Armenia	25 November 2023	See Armenia–Saudi Arabia relations: Armenia is represented in Saudi Arabia by its embassy in Abu Dhabi, United Arab Emirates.; Saudi Arabia is represented in Armenia by its embassy in Tbilisi, Georgia.
Azerbaijan	24 February 1992	See Azerbaijan–Saudi Arabia relations: Azerbaijan and Saudi Arabia established diplomatic relations on 24 February 1992.; Azerbaijan has an embassy in Riyadh.; Saudi Arabia has an embassy in Baku.
Bahrain	29 September 1971	See Bahrain–Saudi Arabia relations: Bahrain and Saudi Arabia established diplomatic relations on 29 September 1971; Bahrain has an embassy in Riyadh.; Saudi Arabia has an embassy in Manama.
Bangladesh	17 November 1975	See Bangladesh–Saudi Arabia relations When Bengali nationalists began a war of liberation against the Pakistani state, Saudi Arabia supported Pakistan and opposed calls for the independence of Bangladesh. Saudi Arabia saw the Bengali nationalists as opposing a Muslim state and thus opposing Islam. Saudi Arabia provided extensive financial and political support to Pakistan during the conflict. The pro-Soviet, secular and socialist policies of the regime of Sheikh Mujibur Rahman, the founding leader of Bangladesh, also antagonized the anti-Communist Saudis. Saudi Arabia and Bangladesh formally established diplomatic relations in 1975–76, after the killing of Sheikh Mujibur Rahman by pro-Islamic military officers. The military regimes of Ziaur Rahman and Hussain Muhammad Ershad took steps to forge strong commercial and cultural ties with Saudi Arabia. Since the late 1970s, a large number of both skilled and unskilled Bangladeshi workers have moved to Saudi Arabia; the number of Bangladeshis living in Saudi Arabia today exceeds 2.7 million. As one of the most populous Muslim countries, Bangladesh is a major source of Hajj pilgrims. Saudi Arabia has become a major source of financing and economic aid to Bangladesh.
China	21 July 1990	See China–Saudi Arabia relations Countries which signed cooperation documents related to the Belt and Road Initiative The People's Republic of China and Saudi Arabia established official diplomatic relations on 21 July 1990. Sino-Saudi diplomatic and economic relations grew closer in the 2000s. In January 2006, King Abdullah was the first ever Saudi head of State to visit China. His visit was reciprocated by Chinese President Hu Jintao in April of the same year. In February 2009, Hu visited Saudi Arabia a second time, to "exchange views on international and regional issues of common concern" with King Abdullah. Following the 2008 Sichuan earthquake, Saudi Arabia was the largest aid donor to China, providing close to €40,000,000 in financial assistance, and an additional €8,000,000 worth of relief materials. In 2008, Sino-Saudi bilateral trade was worth €32,500,000,000, making Saudi Arabia China's largest trading partner in Western Asia. In the first quarter of 2010, Saudi oil export to China has reached over 1,000,000 barrels (160,000 m^{3}), exceeding export to USA. In July 2019, UN ambassadors of 37 countries, including Saudi Arabia, have signed a joint letter to the UNHRC defending China's treatment of Uyghurs and other Muslim minority groups in the Xinjiang region.
India	1947	See India–Saudi Arabia relations Saudi Arabia is one of the largest suppliers of oil to India. India's booming construction industry and rising affluence has created greater demand for goods and services thereby boosting Indian industrial growth. Saudi Arabia has contributed aid to India after the 2001 Gujarat earthquake.: India has an embassy in Riyadh and a consulate-general in Jeddah.; Saudi Arabia has an embassy in New Delhi and a consulate-general in Mumbai.
Indonesia	1 May 1950	See Indonesia–Saudi Arabia relations Saudi Arabia has an embassy in Jakarta, while Indonesia has an embassy in Riyadh and a consulate in Jeddah. Both countries are the member of Organisation of Islamic Cooperation and G-20 major economies. Saudi Arabia and Indonesia have long been close allies. Indonesia sent the largest hajj pilgrims among Muslim countries. The balance of trade is heavily in favor of Saudi Arabia, because of its oil and gas exports to Indonesia. There are more than 600,000 Indonesian workers in Saudi Arabia. Migrant worker abuse and death sentences faced by Indonesian workers in Saudi Arabia are the main problems that have strained diplomatic relations between two countries.
Iran	24 August 1929	See Iran–Saudi Arabia relations See also: Iran–Saudi Arabia proxy conflict Saudi Arabia-Iran relations have been strained throughout history due to the differences between Sunni Islam and Shia Islam. Although Saudi Arabia and Iran are Muslim majority nations, their relationship is fraught with tension, suspicion and hostility. Various attempts have been made to improve the relationship, though none have had lasting success. Both Saudi Arabia and Iran have aspirations for Islamic leadership and both the countries possess a different vision of regional order. Iran, which after the Islamic Revolution strictly followed an anti-US policy, always deemed Saudi Arabia as an agent of the US in the Persian Gulf region that speaks for US interests. Saudi Arabia's concerns about Iran on the other side are mainly associated with its plans of expanding influence to other parts of the Persian Gulf region, especially in post-Saddam Iraq, and the quest to build its own nuclear arsenal. Differences in political ideologies and governance also divided both the countries. For Iran, it is said that there is no place for monarchical regimes in Islam, like the ones seen in Saudi Arabia and also in some other Arab countries. Energy difference is a third source of tension between Saudi Arabia and Iran. While Saudi Arabia, compared to Iran's smaller oil reserves and larger population, can afford to take a long-term view of the global oil market and has an incentive to moderate prices, Iran is compelled to focus on high prices in the short term. Relations in the 2010s and 2020s were increasingly unstable due to the outbreak of crisis in Syria and Iraq in 2014 with the rise of the Islamic State of Iraq and Syria. Despite both countries' efforts to help contain the situation, the Iranian government has at times accused Saudi Arabia of supporting ISIS, which they had done up until the events of June 2014. Relations dropped to an all-time low following the Saudi state's execution of 47 Shia Muslim protesters in January 2016. Iran and Saudi Arabia announced that they would resume relations in 2023.
Iraq	7 April 1931	See Iraq–Saudi Arabia relations Postwar Saudi policy focused on ways to contain potential Iraqi threats to the kingdom and the region. One elements of Riyadh's containment policy included support for Iraqi opposition forces that advocated the overthrow of Saddam Hussein's government. In the past, backing for such groups had been discreet, but in early 1992 the Saudi's invited several Iraqi opposition leaders to Riyadh to attend a well-publicised conference. To further demonstrate Saudi dissatisfaction with the regime in Baghdad, Crown Prince Abdullah permitted the media to videotape his meeting with some of the opponents of Saddam Hussein. In 2019, Saudi Arabia opened a new consulate in Baghdad. Earlier in 2016, the Kingdom reopened its embassy in Baghdad after it was closed in 1990.
Israel		See Israel–Saudi Arabia relations A charter member of the Arab League, Saudi Arabia has supported Palestinian rights to sovereignty, and called for withdrawal from the Occupied Territories since 1967. In recent years, Saudi Arabia has changed its viewpoint concerning the validity of negotiating with Israel. It calls for Israel's withdrawal from territory occupied in June 1967 in order to obtain peace with the Arab states; then-Crown Prince Abdullah extended a multilateral peace proposal based on withdrawal in 2002. At that time, Israel did not respond to the offer. In 2007 Saudi Arabia again officially supported a peaceful resolution of the Arab-Israeli conflict. Saudi Arabia rejected the Camp David accords, claiming that they would be unable to achieve a comprehensive political solution that would ensure Palestinian Arabs could all move to Israel and the division of Jerusalem. In response to Egypt "betraying" the Arab States and signing peace with Israel, Saudi Arabia, along with all the Arab States, broke diplomatic relations with and suspended aid to Egypt, the two countries renewed formal ties in 1987. Saudi Arabia does not have diplomatic relations with Israel. The country participates in an active economic boycott of Israel. However, Saudi Arabia recognizes that its ally, the United States, has a strong and supportive relationship of Israel. Saudi Arabia played an active role in attempting to bring the Palestinians towards a self-governing condition which would permit negotiations with Israel. It has done so primarily by trying to mend the schism between Fatah and Hamas, most notably when King Abdullah invited the two factions to negotiations in Mecca resulting in the Mecca Agreement of 7 February 2007. The agreement soon failed, but Saudi Arabia has continued to support a national unity government for the Palestinians, and strongly opposed Israel's war on Gaza in early 2009. The Times has reported that Saudi Arabia has tested the ability to stand down their air defenses to allow an Israeli strike on Iran to pass through their airspace. Both nations have denied this. On November 18, 2025, during a meeting between Donald Trump and Mohammed bin Salman, the White House announced the possibility of Saudi Arabia agreeing to normalize relations with Israel. In response, bin Salman announced that due to the lack of a real prospect for the formation of a Palestinian state, he would not support normalizing relations with Israel at this time and would only join this process if a clear roadmap for the formation of an independent Palestinian state was agreed upon.
Japan	7 June 1955	See Japan–Saudi Arabia relations Japan is a major trading partner for Saudi Arabia. In 2006, Japan exported $5.103 million worth of goods to the Kingdom, primarily automobiles, machinery and equipment, and metals. In the same year, Saudi Arabia exported $33.624 million worth of goods to Japan, primarily crude oil and petroleum products. Japan imported 1.3 million barrels a day of Saudi crude in 2006, 31% of the nation's total supply.: Japan has an embassy in Riyadh and a consulate-general in Jeddah.; Saudi Arabia has an embassy in Tokyo.
Jordan	12 August 1948	See Jordan-Saudi Arabia relations: Jordan has an embassy in Riyadh and a consulate-general in Jeddah.; Saudi Arabia has an embassy in Amman.
Kuwait	5 October 1961	See Kuwait–Saudi Arabia relations: Kuwait has an embassy in Riyadh and a consulate-general in Jeddah.; Saudi Arabia has an embassy in Kuwait City,
Lebanon	9 April 1944	See Lebanon-Saudi Arabia relations and 2017 Lebanon–Saudi Arabia dispute In 1989, Saudi Arabia along with the United States helped mediate the end of the fifteen-year Lebanese Civil War through the Taif Agreement. Following the assassination of Rafik Hariri, Saudi Arabia called for the immediate withdrawal of the Syrian occupation of Lebanon. Saudi Arabia has opposed Hezbollah's influence in Lebanon as they are seen to be aligned with Iran. On 4 November 2017 Lebanese Prime Minister Saad Hariri announced his resignation from Saudi Arabia, this action led to the 2017 Lebanon–Saudi Arabia dispute.
Malaysia	1957	See Malaysia – Saudi Arabia relations: Malaysia has an embassy in Riyadh.; Saudi Arabia has an embassy in Kuala Lumpur.; Relations, both diplomatic and economic, are quite close between the two Muslim-majority Organisation of Islamic Cooperation members. Additionally, there is a sizable population of Malaysian migrant workers in Saudi Arabia.
Oman	14 December 1971	See Oman–Saudi Arabia relations There have been economic, social and political ties between the two countries.
Pakistan	September 1947	See Pakistan–Saudi Arabia relations Bilateral relations between the Islamic Republic of Pakistan and the Kingdom of Saudi Arabia are largely friendly. Pakistan has been called the closest non-Arab ally of Saudi Arabia, or "Saudi Arabia's closest Muslim ally" Saudi Arabia has been rocking the cradle of Pakistani politics, brokering truce among warring leaders, providing asylum to those being exiled and generously lavishing funds on a state strapped for cash. Diplomatic relations were established at the independence of Pakistan in 1947 and have strengthened considerably owing to cooperation in regional affairs and trade. In 1969 the personnel of the Pakistani Air Force flew the Saudi fighter planes to ward off an invasion from South Yemen. The Kingdom of Saudi Arabia invested in Pakistan, in many Industries. Since the inception of Pakistan, Pakistan has been playing a major and important role in the development of Saudi Arabia. Pakistan has provided assistance in the field of science and technology, infrastructure development and many more fields, Pakistan is providing training facilities to Saudi Armed forces. The Faisal Mosque, the National Mosque of Pakistan in Islamabad, is named in honour of King Faisal and was funded by Saudi Arabia. Faisal Mosque, Islamabad, Pakistan. Due to the Kingdom's continuing support, many places in Pakistan are named after Saudi Kings and Saudi Arabia in general. For example, the city previously named Lyallpur was renamed Faisalabad in honor of the late Faisal of Saudi Arabia. Also, in Karachi, Pakistan, there are neighbourhoods named Saud Colony, Saudabad, Faisal Colony. Also in Karachi, there is an airforce base name Faisal Airbase named after King Faisal and also, in the honor of King Faisal, the main business street of Pakistan is called Sharah-e-Faisal in Karachi. In 2005, due to passing of King Fahd of Saudi Arabia, Pakistan declared a seven-day mourning period. Saudi Arabia also hosted former Pakistani Prime Minister Nawaz Sharif for 8 years while he was in exile. During his stay there, Kingdom held talks with Sharif and even provided him with license to operate business in the Kingdom. It is believed that it was Kingdom of Saudi Arabia which held talks with President Pervez Musharraf of Pakistan to foster their relationship and to allow Sharif back in Pakistan. The leaked cables revealed in 2010 that Saudis are "long accustomed to having a significant role in Pakistan's affairs." One of the Saudi diplomat boasted about the Saudi involvement in Pakistani affairs, stating, "We in Saudi Arabia are not observers in Pakistan, we are participants." Saudi Arabia also complained over President Zardari's alleged corruption and bias against Shiite Iran, thus fearing a Shia triangle stretching from Iraq, Iran to Pakistan. The cables further alleged that, Prince Mohammed bin Nayef, then Saudi assistant minister of interior, described the Pakistani Chief of Army staff Ashfaq Parvez Kayani as a "decent man" and the Pakistani Army as Saudi Arabia's "winning horse" and its "best bet" for "stability". Time reported that "despite the tensions with Zardari's government, military and intelligence links between Riyadh and Islamabad remain strong and close." Time interviewee, Arif Rafiq of an international consulting firm, stated that the cables "demonstrate that the Saudis have deep vested interests in Pakistan and an influence that is so significant that even the U.S. in some way relies on Saudi knowledge of the country."
Palestine	1 January 1989	See Palestine-Saudi Arabia relations State of Palestine and Saudi Arabia established diplomatic relations on 1 January 1989 when opened Embassy State of Palestine in Riyadh.
Philippines	24 October 1969	See Philippines–Saudi Arabia relations The Philippines–Saudi Arabia relations refers to the bilateral relations of the Philippines and Saudi Arabia. Formal diplomatic relations between the two countries were established on 24 October 1969. Trade relations: In 2012, Saudi Arabia was the 10th largest trading partner of the Philippines, 31st and 8th largest market in the export and import market respectively. Saudi Arabia was also the Philippines' largest trading partner and import supplier, and second largest export market in the Middle East. According to the Saudi government, trade between Saudi Arabia and the Philippines amounted to $3.6 billion in 2011, a bigger figure from compared to the previous year's trade figure amounting to $2.7 billion. Labor relations: As of June 2013, there are about 674,000 Filipinos working in Saudi Arabia according to the Saudi Ministry of Interior. A landmark agreement on Filipino household service workers were signed between Saudi Arabia and the Philippines. The agreement was the first for Saudi Arabia with a labor-supplying country. In 2012, about 150,000 Filipino female nurses are working in Saudi Arabia. This accounts for 25 percent of the total number of Overseas Filipino Workers in the Kingdom.
Qatar	12 October 1971	See Qatar–Saudi Arabia relations Both countries established diplomatic relations on 12 October 1971 when signed agreement to exchange ambassadors. In 1969, an agreement with Qatar was reached about their borders after three years of dispute. A final agreement about the Qatar border was signed in 2001. After a March 2014 meeting of the Gulf Cooperation Council, the United Arab Emirates, Saudi Arabia and Bahrain announced the recall of their ambassadors to Qatar. Some financial economists have interpreted the 2014 Saudi–Qatari rift as the tangible political sign of a growing economic rivalry between oil and natural gas producers, which could "have deep and long-lasting consequences" beyond the Middle East-North Africa area. On 5 June 2017, Saudi Arabia severed diplomatic relations, as well as other ties, with Qatar. Saudi Arabia explained the decision by referring to Qatar's "embrace of various terrorist and sectarian groups aimed at destabilising the region", including the Muslim Brotherhood, al-Qaida, Islamic State, and groups supported by Iran in the kingdom's eastern province of Qatif. diplomatic relations were re-established in 2021
South Korea	16 October 1962	See Saudi Arabia–South Korea relations The link between South Korea and Saudi Arabia have been historically strong from the old era when Arab merchants came to the Korean Kingdom United Silla in 7th and 8th century. This has resulted in the growth of trades between Korea and the Arab world despite regime changes on both sides. There are two Korean international schools in Saudi Arabia: Korean International School of Jeddah (KISJ; 젯다한국국제학교) and Korean School in Riyadh (리야드한국학교). During the period 1973-1984, a total of approximately 720,000 Korean workers were employed in various projects in Saudi Arabia. Korean migration to Saudi Arabia has peaked in 1982 and 1983, with over 122,000 South Koreans entering Saudi Arabia in each of those years, making up over 70% of Korean migration to the region. However, by 1985, the number of South Koreans entering Saudi Arabia had fallen to 58,924, paralleling a downward trend in the whole region. As of 2015, there are 5,189 Koreans living in Saudi Arabia. In business, the Kingdom of Saudi Arabia is the largest exporter of oil to the Republic of Korea (300,000,000 barrels, 2014) Also, ARAMCO Korea was established in 2012. In 2016, two-way trade volume reached US$29.04 billion with South Korea exporting cars, electronic goods, steel and other items to Saudi Arabia and importing oil and other petrochemical products from it. Now, South Korea is described as a "core" partner for the Saudi Vision 2030 project, noting progress in joint efforts to flesh out their cooperation scheme to realize the vision.: South Korea has an embassy in Riyadh and a consulate in Jeddah; Saudi Arabia has an embassy in Seoul
Sri Lanka	30 November 1974	Both countries established diplomatic relations on 30 November 1974: Sri Lanka has an embassy in Riyadh; Saudi Arabia has an embassy in Colombo
Syria	26 June 1944	See Saudi Arabia–Syria relations Both countries established diplomatic relations on 26 June 1944: Saudi Arabia has an embassy in Damascus.; Syria has an embassy in Riyadh.; Relations between the two countries greatly deteriorated following the outbreak of the Syrian civil war.; Between 2018 and 2023, both countries made a gradual reaprochement.; Both countries are members of the Arab League.
Thailand	1 October 1957	See Saudi Arabia–Thailand relations The country enjoyed a very friendly and strongly strategic partnership The historically friendly and strategic relationship between Thailand and Saudi Arabia had drastically deteriorated since the 1990s, following the Blue Diamond Affair. Diplomatic missions were downgraded to the chargé d'affaires level and the number of Thai workers in Saudi Arabia plummeted. Saudi Arabia did not issue working visas for Thais and discouraged its citizens from visiting the country. Relations between Thailand and Saudi Arabia, already strained, plunged to a new low in 2014 following a Criminal Court decision that acquitted five ex-police officers in relation to the murder of a Saudi businessman in 1990. On January 26, 2022, both countries announced they restored full diplomatic relations and have appointed ambassadors. Saudi Arabia has an embassy in Bangkok and Thailand has an embassy in Riyadh.
Turkey	3 August 1929	See Saudi Arabia–Turkey relations Both countries established diplomatic relations on 3 August 1929. Turkey was one of the first states that recognised the country in 1926 and had a diplomatic mission in Hijaz. Saudi Arabia has an embassy in Ankara and a consulate – general in Istanbul. Turkey has an embassy in Riyadh and a consulate – general in Jeddah. Both countries are full members of the World Trade Organization (WTO) and the Organization of Islamic Cooperation (OIC). On the other hand, in 1986 Saudi Arabia proposed that Turkey should have ended commercial relations with Iran and that it could compensate Turkey's losses resulting from this.
United Arab Emirates	21 August 1974	See Saudi Arabia–United Arab Emirates relations Both countries established diplomatic relations on 21 August 1974.: Saudi Arabia has an embassy in Abu Dhabi and a consulate-general in Dubai.; United Arab Emirates has an embassy in Riyadh and a consulate-general in Jeddah.
Yemen	21 June 1957	Both countries established diplomatic relations on 21 June 1957 when the Government of Saudi Arabia is establishing a Legation in Yemen and appointed Abdul Rahman Abikan as its first Minister of Saudi Arabia to Yemen. See Saudi-Yemen Relations For Saudi Arabia, Yemen has long been a serious national security concern. The historical tensions between Saudi Arabia and Yemen, which persist to this day, stem in part from the House of Saud’s annexation of the Asir, Najran and Jazan in 1934, now located in southern Saudi Arabia. Relations between the two countries have historically fluctuated with the Saudis having many access points into Yemen via both formal and informal networks. Then Crown Prince Sultan managed the tribal networks for decades but the tribal system is diminishing and the Saudi tribal connections have weakened as a result. While relations with former President Saleh were often stormy, Saudi Arabia considers the Iranian backed Houthis to be a terrorist group and a threat to the stability of not only their kingdom but the entire region. Due to these concerns, Saudi Arabia led an invasion of Yemen in 2015, resulting in an ongoing conflict.

=== Europe ===
Country	Formal Relations Began	Notes
Albania	2 December 1992	Both countries established diplomatic relations on 2 December 1992: Albania has an embassy in Riyadh.; Saudi Arabia has an embassy in Tirana.
Austria	10 September 1957	Both countries established diplomatic relations on 10 September 1957 See Austria–Saudi Arabia relations: Both countries had diplomatic contact since 7 July 1880, with the opening of an Austrian consulate in Jeddah (then under Ottoman occupation).; Austria has an embassy in Riyadh.; Saudi Arabia has an embassy in Vienna.; Austria Ministry of Foreign Affairs: list of bilateral treaties (in German only)
Belgium	10 April 1955	Both countries established diplomatic relations on 10 April 1955.: Belgium has an embassy in Riyadh.; Saudi Arabia has an embassy in Brussels.
Bulgaria		Bulgaria has an embassy in Riyadh.; Saudi Arabia has an embassy in Sofia.
Croatia	8 June 1995	See Croatia–Saudi Arabia relations: Croatia is represented in Saudi Arabia through its embassy in Cairo (Egypt).; Saudi Arabia isn't represented in Croatia but citizens that need any assistance are advised to contact Saudi Arabia embassy in Sarajevo (BiH).; Both countries are members of the United Nations.
Cyprus	1961	See Cyprus–Saudi Arabia relations: Cyprus is represented through its honorary consulate in Jeddah.; Saudi Arabia is represented through its embassy in Nicosia.; Both countries are members of the United Nations.
Denmark	1 February 1962	See Denmark–Saudi Arabia relations Both countries established diplomatic relations on 1 February 1962 when has been accredited first Ambassador of Saudi Arabia to Denmark Sheik Gawad Moustafa Zikry.: Saudi Arabia has an embassy in Hellerup, Copenhagen.; Denmark has an embassy in Riyadh, Saudi Arabia.
Finland	6 June 1969	Both countries established diplomatic relations on 6 June 1969: Finland has an embassy in Riyadh and an honorary consulate general in Jeddah.; Saudi Arabia opened an embassy in Helsinki; Ministry for Foreign Affairs of Finland about relations with Saudi Arabia
France	March 1926	See France–Saudi Arabia relations: France has an embassy in Riyadh and a consulate-general in Jeddah.; Saudi Arabia has an embassy in Paris.
Germany	26 April 1929	Both countries established diplomatic relations on 26 April 1929. Diplomatic Relations between Federal Republic of Germany and Saudi Arabia were established on 10 November 1954. See Germany–Saudi Arabia relations: Germany has an embassy in Riyadh and a consulate general in Jeddah.; Saudi Arabia has an embassy in Berlin and a consulate general in Frankfurt am Main.; German Ministry of Foreign Affairs: Relations between Germany and Saudi Arabia
Greece	1926	See Greece–Saudi Arabia relations The two countries started Diplomatic relations in 1926: Greece has an embassy in Riyadh.; Saudi Arabia has an embassy in Athens.
Ireland	September 1974	Both countries established diplomatic relations in September 1974.: Ireland has an embassy in Riyadh and an honorary consulate in Jeddah.; Saudi Arabia has an embassy in Dublin.
Italy	10 February 1932	Both countries established diplomatic relations on 10 February 1932 with signed the Treaty of Friendship between Italy and the Kingdom of Nejd and Hejaz. See Italy–Saudi Arabia relations: Italy has an embassy in Riyadh and a consulate in Jeddah.; Saudi Arabia has an embassy in Rome.
Kosovo	7 August 2009	See Kosovo–Saudi Arabia relations Both countries established diplomatic relations on 7 August 2009.: Kosovo has an embassy in Riyadh.; Saudi Arabia is accredited to Kosovo from its embassy in Tirana, Albania.
Liechtenstein	29 April 2009	Both countries established diplomatic relations on 29 April 2009: The interests of Liechtenstein are handled through the Swiss embassy in Riyadh.; Saudi Arabia's embassy in Bern also serves as non-resident embassy for Liechtenstein.
Netherlands	9 June 1930	Both countries established diplomatic relations on 9 June 1930 when first the Netherlands Charge d'Affaires, M. Van de Meulen, presented letters of credence to King Ibn Saud. See Netherlands–Saudi Arabia relations: The Netherlands has an embassy in Riyadh.; Saudi Arabia has an embassy in The Hague.
Norway	8 May 1961	Both countries established diplomatic relations on 8 May 1961: Norway has had an embassy in Riyadh since 1976.; Saudi Arabia has had an embassy in Oslo since 2012.
Poland	3 May 1995	See Poland–Saudi Arabia relations: Poland has an embassy in Riyadh.; Saudi Arabia has an embassy in Warsaw.
Portugal	18 June 1980	Portugal and Saudi Arabia established diplomatic relations on 18 June 1980.; Portugal has an embassy in Riyadh since 1982.; Saudi Arabia has an embassy in Lisbon.
Romania	13 March 1995	See Romania – Saudi Arabia relations: Romania has an embassy in Riyadh.; Saudi Arabia has an embassy in Bucharest.
Russia	19 February 1926	Both countries established diplomatic relations on 19 February 1926. See Russia–Saudi Arabia relations: Russia has an embassy in Riyadh.; Saudi Arabia has an embassy in Moscow.
Serbia	17 April 2013	See Saudi Arabia–Serbia relations: Serbia and Saudi Arabia established diplomatic relations on 17 April 2013; Saudi Arabia is accredited to Serbia from its embassy in Budapest, Hungary.; Serbia has an embassy in Riyadh.
Spain	30 August 1948	See Saudi Arabia–Spain relations Both countries established diplomatic relations on 30 August 1948.: Saudi Arabia has an embassy in Madrid and a consulate in Málaga.; Spain has an embassy in Riyadh.
Sweden	1957	See Saudi Arabia–Sweden relations Embassy of Saudi Arabia in Stockholm Both countries established diplomatic relations in 1957: The 2005 Project Simoom contract on weapon industry cooperation was torn up by the Swedish government in 2015.; Swedish foreign minister Wallström's planned speech for the Arab Union in March 2015 was blocked by Saudi Arabia, after Sweden criticized Saudi Arabia on human rights issues.; Sweden has an embassy in Riyadh.; Saudi Arabia has an embassy in Stockholm,
Ukraine	14 April 1993	See Saudi Arabia–Ukraine relations Both countries established diplomatic relations on 14 April 1993: Saudi Arabia recognized Ukraine's independence in 1992.; Saudi Arabia is represented in Ukraine through its embassy in Kyiv.; Ukraine has an embassy in Riyadh and an honorary consulate in Jeddah.; In January 2003, Ukrainian President Leonid Kuchma made an official visit to Saudi Arabia.
United Kingdom	20 May 1927	See Saudi Arabia–United Kingdom relations British Prime Minister Keir Starmer with Saudi Crown Prince Mohammed bin Salman in Riyadh, December 2024. Both countries established diplomatic relations on 20 May 1927 when signed in Jeddah Treaty of Friendship between Great Britain and Kingdom of Hejaz and Najd.: Saudi Arabia maintains an embassy in London.; The United Kingdom is accredited to Saudi Arabia through its embassy in Riyadh, as well as a consulate general in Jeddah.; Both countries share common membership of the United Nations, the World Health Organization, and the World Trade Organization. Bilaterally the two countries have a Critical Minerals Partnership, a Defence Agreement, a Double Taxation Agreement, and a Strategic Partnership. Both countries are negotiating a Free Trade Agreement.

=== Oceania ===
Country	Formal Relations Began	Notes
Australia	15 January 1974	See Australia–Saudi Arabia relations Both countries established diplomatic relations on 15 January 1974: Australia has an embassy in Riyadh and a consulate in Jeddah.; Saudi Arabia has an embassy in Canberra and a consulate in Sydney.
New Zealand	22 December 1976	Both countries established diplomatic relations on 22 December 1976: New Zealand has an embassy in Riyadh.; Saudi Arabia has an embassy in Wellington and a consulate-general in Auckland.

== Public relations and propaganda ==
The reputation of Saudi Arabia in the West has always been controversial due to its record of human rights abuses and the Saudi involvement in the Yemen civil war.

The United Kingdom and United States have become a major centre for public relations (PR) supporting the Saudi regime. Lina Khatib, head of the Middle East and north Africa programme at Chatham House, said that Saudi Arabia had embarked upon a "wide-ranging PR campaign focused on the UK and the US" since 2016, which involved English-language content targeting a British audience. This PR, linked with the support of Theresa May in arms sales during the war in Yemen. In the UK, media PR depicted Mohammed bin Salman as a reforming prince, and major newspapers ran adverts promoting Bin Salman's 'reform agenda'.

This image has been undermined by disappearance and apparent Saudi state-sanctioned murder of Washington Post journalist Jamal Khashoggi. Following these allegations, US Secretary of State, Mike Pompeo said, "We call on the government of Saudi Arabia to support a thorough investigation of Mr Khashoggi's disappearance and to be transparent about the results of that investigation" and a UK Foreign Office spokesman said, "These are extremely serious allegations. We are aware of the latest reports and are working urgently to establish the facts, including with the government of Saudi Arabia." France also sought an explanation as to how an "accomplished and esteemed" journalist such as Khashoggi vanished.

Following the murder of Khashoggi, Germany's Chancellor Angela Merkel halted the sale of weapons to Saudi. A non-binding resolution was also voted in the European Parliament to "impose an EU-wide arms embargo on Saudi Arabia". Canadian Prime Minister Justin Trudeau threatened to cancel a multimillion-dollar defence contract amidst the Khashoggi controversy.

Consulum, a London-based PR firm primarily staffed by former Bell Pottinger employees, has worked on communications programmes with the Saudi Arabian government and PR firm Freud Communications, which has worked with the kingdom in propagating the Saudi Vision 2030 relaunch under Bin Salman, distanced itself from the regime following the disappearance of Khashoggi. Pagefield Global Counsel and Kekst CNC (a London division of French PR company Publicis) have said that they previously worked with the regime but no longer work in Saudi Arabia.

A number of media companies that have worked with the Saudi state to promote its overseas image. Bin Salman met Vice Media founder Shane Smith in early 2018 on his tour of the US, and Vice has had a team promoting the country with the Saudi Research and Marketing Group (SRMG), a Saudi regime-affiliated publishing group and 'organ of soft power'. SMRG has signed a deal with The Independent to launch foreign-language websites (including Arabic) across the Middle East, which has led to concern over potential editorial influence by the Saudi publisher. SMRG also donates to the Tony Blair Institute for Global Change to facilitate Tony Blair's work on the Saudi modernisation programme.

According to a FARA eFile document filed with the US Department of Justice, the Embassy of Saudi Arabia in Washington, D.C., hired an ex-top lobbyist of the Heritage Foundation for a brief legislative push before the inauguration of 2020 President-elect Joe Biden and his administration. The contract with Off Hill Strategies worth $25,000-per-month was effective from 19 October 2020 through 18 January 2021, two days before the inauguration of President Biden. As per the filing, the PR firm was tasked with serving "federal legislative advocacy and related services to support the Embassy's congressional outreach efforts and further advance bilateral ties between the Kingdom of Saudi Arabia and the United States." During the primary debate of 2019, Biden was quoted as calling Saudi Arabia a "pariah" and promising to end the US arms sales to Riyadh following its alleged use in the Saudi-led coalition's war in Yemen that has resulted in the deaths of thousands of civilians. Off Hill Strategies has been called the Saudi embassy's first hiring in 2020.

== International organization participation ==
Saudi Arabia is a member of the ABEDA, AfDB, AFESD, AL, AMF, BIS, ESCWA, FAO, G-20, G-77, GCC, IAEA, IBRD, ICAO, ICC, ICRM, IDA, IDB, IFAD, IFC, IFRCS, ILO, IMF, International Maritime Organization, Inmarsat, Intelsat, Interpol, IOC, ISO, ITU, NAM, OAPEC, OAS (observer), OIC, OPCW, OPEC, UN, UNCTAD, UNESCO, UNIDO, UPU, WCO, WFTU, WHO, WIPO, WMO, and WTrO.

== See also ==
- Iran-Arab Relations (Saudi Arabia)
- List of diplomatic missions in Saudi Arabia
- List of diplomatic missions of Saudi Arabia
- Territorial disputes in the Persian Gulf

== Sources ==
- Seok, Hyunho (1991), "Korean migrant workers to the Middle East", in Gunatilleke, Godfrey (ed.), Migration to the Arab World: Experience of Returning Migrants, United Nations University Press, pp. 56–103, ISBN 978-92-808-0745-5
