= Italy–Saudi Arabia relations =

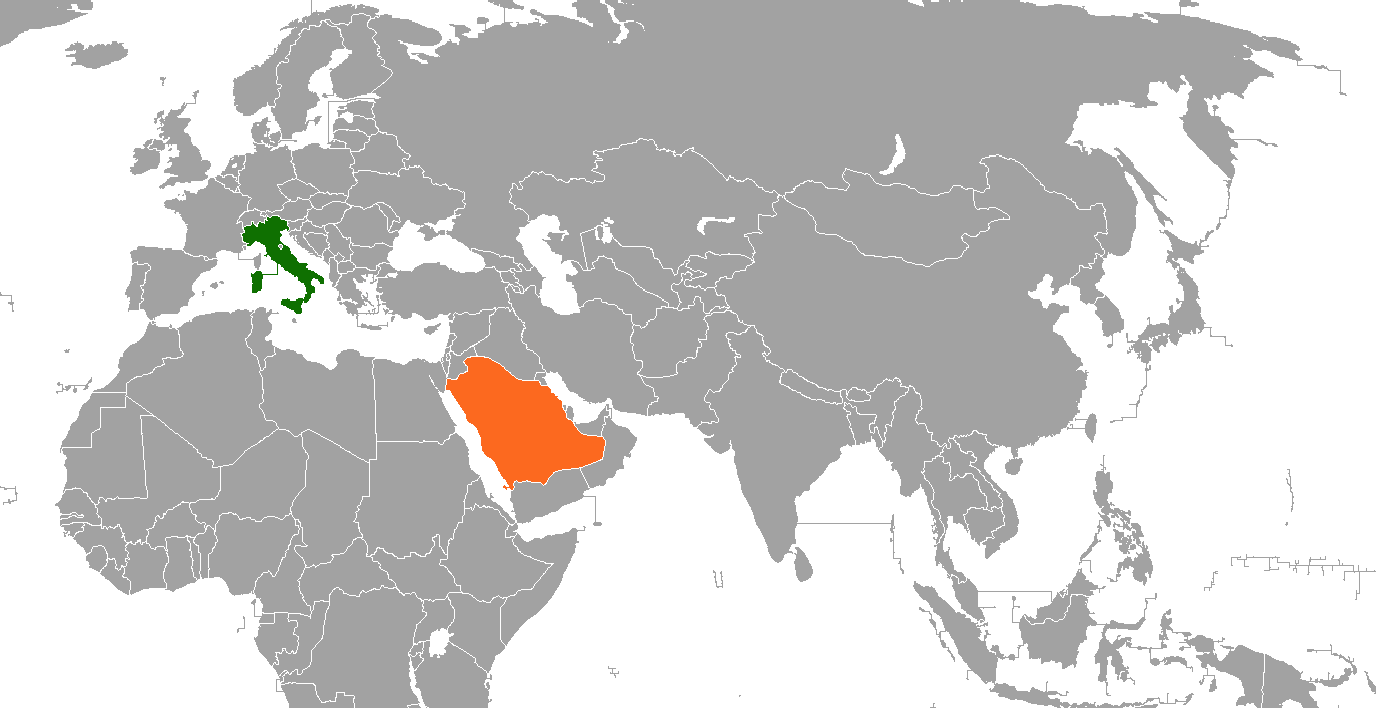
- Italy: Saudi Arabia

Relations between Italy and Saudi Arabia are the bilateral relations between two nations. Italy has an embassy in Riyadh and Saudi Arabia has an embassy in Rome.

== History ==
Historically, the ancient Roman Empire had built its connection to various parts of the Arabian peninsula, where rich archaeological findings had been found fostering the relations.

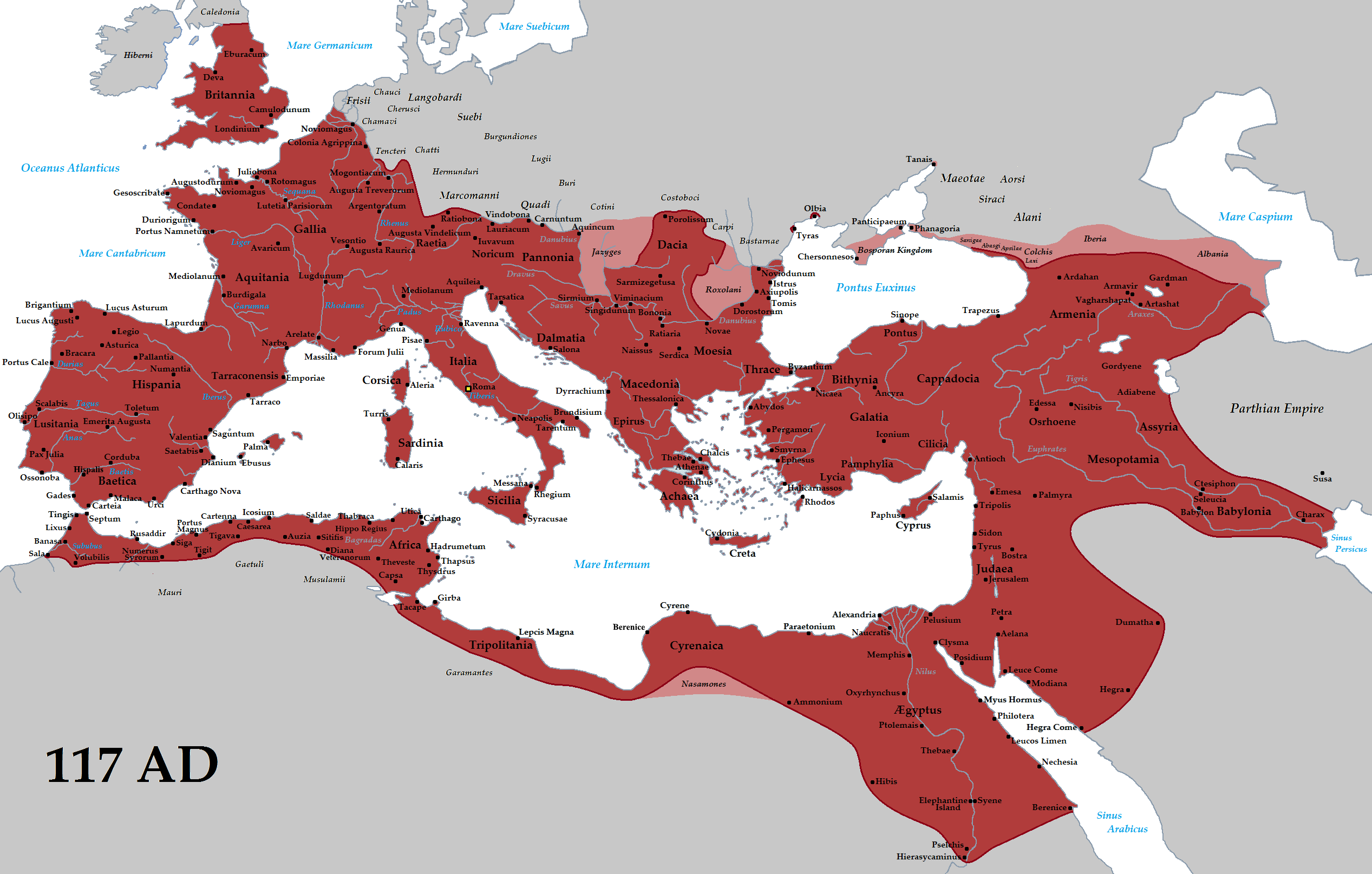
Large areas of Arabia came under the Roman Empire

Italy and the Kingdom of Nejd and Hejaz and its Dependencies first established a tie on 10 February 1932 when a treaty of friendship was signed by Italian Consul Guido Sollazzo and Saudi Foreign Minister Prince Faisal in Jeddah. The relations continued following the establishment of the Kingdom of Saudi Arabia on 22 September 1932 and a treaty of trade was signed by the parties on the same date. However, during the 1934 Saudi–Yemeni War, Italy provided support for the Yemenis against the Saudis, and this had drawn criticism from the Saudis. Nonetheless, it affected little and the relations between the two countries went on uninterrupted.

In World War II, when Italy was involved, Saudi Arabia declared neutrality while severing all relations with the Axis powers, of which Italy was a member; its oil revenues were subsidized by the Allies. On 13 January 1951, Saudi Arabia established its legation in Rome and appointed Muwaffaq Al Alusi as minister.

== Modern relations ==
Following the end of World War II, Italy and Saudi Arabia were quick to re-establish ties and the two nations became major economic partners. In 2013, Italy and Saudi Arabia celebrated their 80th year of relations. Italy is also committed to financing specific cultural activities such as lectures and seminars held in Saudi Arabia by Italian professors, from various Italian Universities and research centers, and by chairs of the Arab language and/or Islamic art and culture. Currently, efforts are underway to revive such exchanges between the academic institutions of both countries.

In 2018, Italian Minister of the Interior Matteo Salvini hosted Saudi Ambassador and praised Saudi Arabia.

In 2020, Italian Foreign Minister Angelino Alfano described the relations as "good" and "expanding"; Saudi Foreign Minister Adel al-Jubeir also hailed the relations as "historic".

== Military cooperation ==
Since the Yemeni conflict broke out in 2014, Italy has emerged as a major weapon supplier to Saudi Arabia when the Kingdom intervened to support Abd Rabbuh Mansur Hadi, this had generated criticism in Italy due to it being used to kill indiscriminately civilians in Yemen.

Between 2019 and 2020, protests against Saudi Arabia's war in Yemen had led to Italian worker unions to several times refusing to load ships for the conflict.

Italian government has faced pressure to prevent all arms export to Saudi Arabia in allegation of war crimes committed by Saudi military against Yemenis.

== Resident diplomatic missions ==
- Italy has an embassy in Riyadh and a consulate-general in Jeddah.
- Saudi Arabia has an embassy in Rome.

== See also ==
- Foreign relations of Italy
- Foreign relations of Saudi Arabia
- Saudi Arabia–European Union relations
