= Saudi Arabia–Senegal relations =

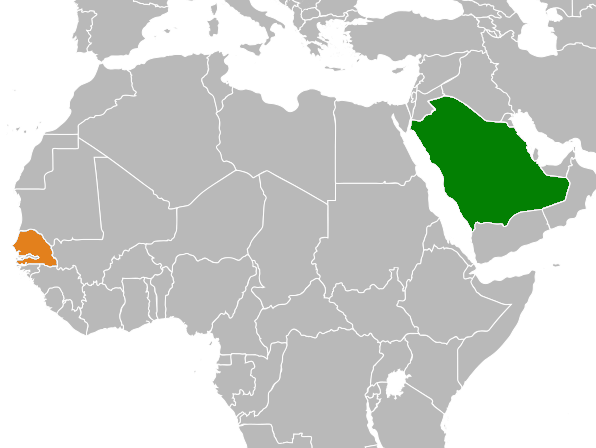
- Saudi Arabia: Senegal

Saudi Arabia–Senegal relations are the current and historical relations between Saudi Arabia and Senegal. Saudi Arabia has an embassy in Dakar while Senegal has an embassy in Riyadh and a consulate in Jeddah.

Both being dominated by Sunni Islam, Saudi Arabia and Senegal have developed a strong relationship.

== Current relations ==
=== Yemeni Civil War ===
Since the beginning of Yemeni Civil War, Senegal has participated as part of Saudi-led coalition against the Houthis, a Shia rebel group native to Yemen. Senegal has promised to deploy over 2,100 troops to Saudi Arabia. However, this promise has never been resolved.

=== Iran ===
Although it maintains a close tie with Iran, Senegal is cautious of Iran's influence in the country. In response, Saudi Arabia has tried to counter Iranian influence in the African nation.

=== Qatar diplomatic crisis ===
While not eliminating ties with Qatar, Senegal has supported Saudi Arabia by diminishing its relationship with Qatar since the diplomatic conflict between Qatar and Saudi Arabia started. Nonetheless, Senegal later re-appointed its ambassador to Qatar, hoping to reduce tensions between two Gulf Arab nations.

== See also ==
- Foreign relations of Saudi Arabia
- Foreign relations of Senegal
