= Romania–Saudi Arabia relations =

- Romania: Saudi Arabia

Romania–Saudi Arabia relations are foreign, economic and cultural relations between Romania and Saudi Arabia. Romania has an embassy in Riyadh and an honorary consulate in Jeddah. Saudi Arabia has an embassy in Bucharest.

== Official exchanges ==
Since the Romanian revolution of 1989, the two countries have routinely engaged in friendly diplomatic exchanges. In October 1999, Romanian Prime Minister Radu Vasile received a delegation of the Majlis-ash-Shura (Consultative Council) of Saudi Arabia, headed by its chairman, Shaykh Muhammad bin Ibrahim bin Uthman bin Jubayr. Jubayr proposed development of an agreement for trade, economic, technical, cultural and sports cooperation, particularly cooperation in the oil sector.

In March 2000, Romania's Foreign Affairs State Secretary Mihai Răzvan Ungureanu met with Saudi Arabia's First Deputy Foreign Minister Nizar Bin Obaid Madani. Madani told reporters after the meeting that the main goal of his visit was to search for ways of diversifying and consolidating the Saudi-Romanian ties. In April 2000, King Fahd Bin Abd-al-Aziz met with Romania's deputy premier and foreign minister Petre Roman. Petre Roman also met with his counterpart Sa'ud al-Faysal and Crown Prince Abdullah, the secretary-general of the Gulf Cooperation Council. They discussed development of greater economic cooperations between the countries. In May 2000, the president of the Romanian Senate, Mircea Ionescu Quintus visited Saudi Arabia at the invitation of the chairman of the Saudi Consultative Council, Shaykh Muhammad Bin Ibrahim al-Jubayr.

In March 2003, Chairman of the Romanian Chamber of Commerce and Industry George Cojocaru and vice-chairman of Saudi Arabia's Riyadh Chamber of Commerce and Industry Abdul Aziz al-Athel signed a memorandum on the setting up of the bilateral Romanian-Saudi Economic Council.

Since 2006, relationships have become closer, with more tangible progress on trade and investment. In November 2006, Dr. Hashim Abdullah Yamani, minister of commerce & industry of Saudi Arabia, visited Bucharest, where a broader framework of economic cooperation was discussed. At the meeting, the Romanian vice Premier Bogdan Pascu said the Kingdom of Saudi Arabia is an important economic partner and Romania is interested in developing the economic contacts existing between the two states. Also in November, Romanian Dr. Ion Dobreci presented his credentials to Prince Saud Al-Faisal, foreign minister, in Riyadh. He said Bucharest seeks to boost economic, technical, scientific and cultural cooperation with Saudi Arabia, and is examining the possibility of cooperation in oil & petrochemical sector. A Romanian economic mission was to visit Saudi Arabia and Bahrain in November 2007, meeting with the chambers of commerce and industry in Jeddah, Riyadh, Dammam and Bahrain.

== Trade and investment ==
As of 2005, total Saudi-Romanian trade was relatively low, in the region of US$200 million per year. Although an oil producer, Romania imports oil from Saudi Arabia. Exports from Romania to Saudi Arabia include steel and aluminum products used in the oil industry.

In May 2007, the Romanian ambassador to Saudi Arabia said that Saudi investors had made total investments of US$2.2 billion in Romania to date. For example, in 2001 it was reported that the Amiantit group of Saudi Arabia planned to invest at least 54M euro in existing pipe production units in Romania, and that the value of the group's production in Romania would rise to 109M euro a year. Another example was the 2007 acquisition of a controlling stake in Romania's state-owned Electroputere by a subsidiary of the Saudi Mada Group, which bought the controlling stake in the Romanian manufacturer of train engines, generators and electrical transformers for $174 million, and intends to invest $1 billion to modernize the company. Mada is involved in major railway project in Saudi Arabia, and plans to use the company's engines. The Electroputere deal was finalized in November 2007. Also in 2007, the Saudi Zamil Group was looking into investment in Romania's steel and pipe projects, and a major housing project of 25,000 units in Romania was being developed by a Saudi-Romanian joint venture. In 2008, Saudi Oger bought the Romanian cellular service provider Telemobil (Zapp). A significant number of Romanian workers, particularly engineers, are employed in the oil and construction industries in Saudi Arabia.

== Resident diplomatic missions ==
- Romania has an embassy in Riyadh.
- Saudi Arabia has an embassy in Bucharest.

== See also ==
- Foreign relations of Romania
- Foreign relations of Saudi Arabia
