= France–Saudi Arabia relations =

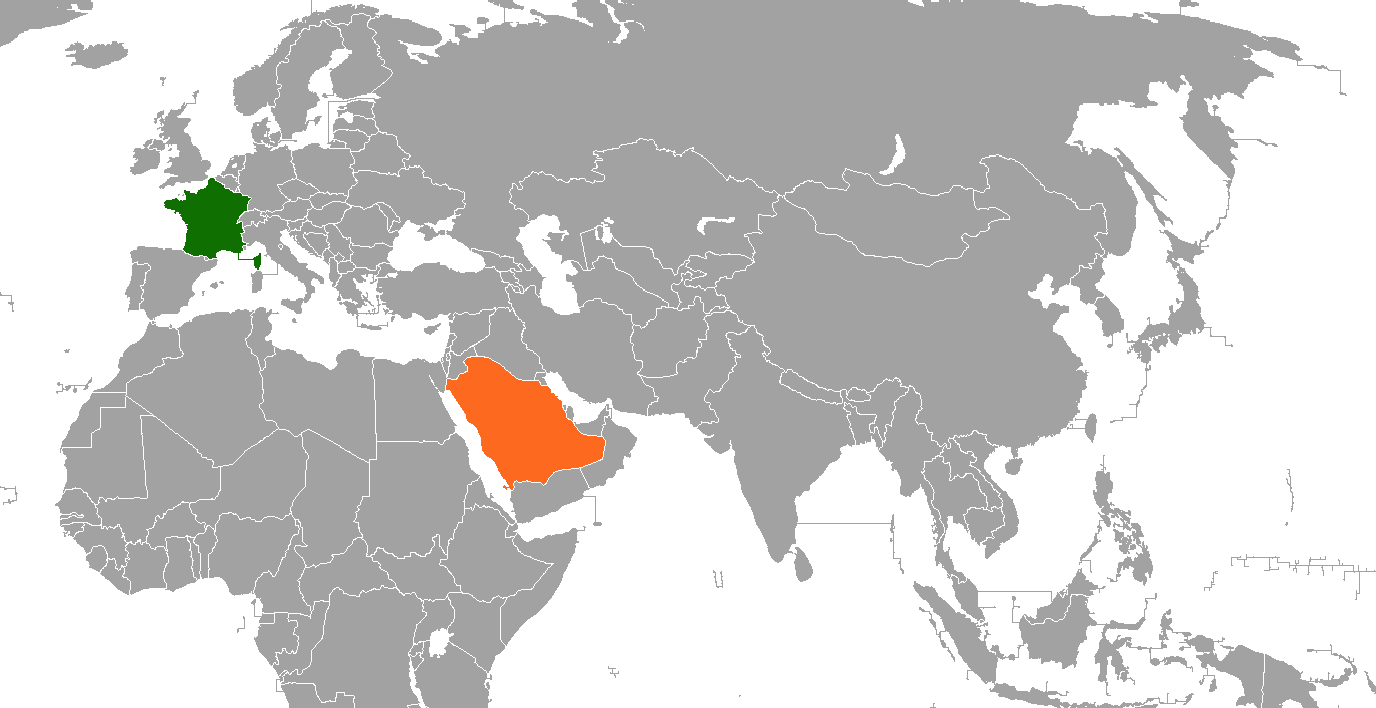
- France: Saudi Arabia

Diplomatic mission
- Embassy of France, Riyadh: Embassy of Saudi Arabia, Paris

France–Saudi Arabia relations are the foreign relations between France and Saudi Arabia. Diplomatic relations began in 1926. Today Saudi Arabia is an ally of France, with strong economic, military and political coordination on many topics such as Iran's nuclear program and the departure of Bashar al-Assad. The relationship has been called a global strategic partnership. France has an embassy in Riyadh, and a consulate-general in Jeddah. Saudi Arabia has an embassy in Paris. Both countries are members of G20.

== History ==
In the 16th century, Ottoman Arabia together with the Ottoman Empire under Suleiman the Magnificent had a military, cultural and trade alliance with the Kingdom of France. France opened its first consulate in Jeddah in 1839, decades before Saudi Arabia was officially formed.

Both Saudi Arabia and France were opposed to the Axis in World War II, in which Saudi Arabia supplied oil to the Allies. Afterwards, Saudi Arabia was aligned with NATO countries against communism.

Since King Faisal and General de Gaulle met in 1967, bilateral relations have evolved through personal contacts at the highest levels.

In the 1970s, after a large group of islamic extremists invaded the Grand mosque in Mecca, France sent special police to help the Saudi police and military.

France joined the United States and other coalition forces in Desert Shield, an operation by American president George H.W Bush to defend the Kingdom from Iraqi aggression after the invasion of Kuwait.

In 2016, amid the Saudi-led military intervention in Yemen, France condemned a Houthi ballistic missile launch towards Saudi Arabia that Saudi authorities said was aimed at Mecca.

In September 2026, France announced the deployment of troops, radar systems and air defence equipment to protect the Saudi Red Sea port of Yanbu, a key oil export terminal. French officials described the deployment as strictly defensive amid escalating Houthi attacks.

== State visits ==
An official visit in May 2015 by French president François Hollande was particularly historic as he met Custodian of the Two Holy Mosques King Salman, Crown Prince Mohammed bin Nayef and Deputy Crown Prince Mohammed bin Salman and he was the guest of honor at the Gulf Cooperation Council summit, and in March 2015 Crown Prince Mohamed bin Nayef, deputy premier and interior minister visited France, where he received the Legion of Honor, the highest honor in France whose recipients are designated by the French president.

In 2015, French President Francois Hollande was invited by Saudi Arabia to address a Gulf Cooperation Council summit in Saudi Arabia, a role not often given to a foreign head of state.

On 6 March 2016, A joint communiqué was signed between Saudi Arabia and France at the end of the official visit to Paris of Crown Prince Mohammed bin Naif.

In May 2016, a delegation of the Saudi French Parliamentary Friendship Committee of the Shura Council had a meeting with French Foreign Minister Jean-Marc Ayrault at the French Foreign Ministry in Paris.

On 4 December 2021, French President Emmanuel Macron ended a short tour of Gulf states by meeting Crown Prince Mohammed bin Salman in Jeddah.

On 19 March 2025, French President Emmanuel Macron met with Saudi Crown Prince Mohammed bin Salman in Riyadh, where they condemned the resumption of Israeli strikes on Gaza and emphasized the need for a ceasefire. They announced plans to co-chair a conference on a two-state solution. Macron also welcomed Saudi Arabia’s Jeddah initiative, which facilitated Ukraine peace talks. The leaders further discussed Syria and Lebanon, reaffirming their commitment to Lebanese sovereignty and a stable Syrian transition.

== Economic relations ==
According to Al Arabiya New sources these contracts, which highlight Paris growing ties with Riyadh, are “the first signs of a much stronger Saudi-French alliance, and the next few months are going to demonstrate exactly just how close these two allies have now become.”

A forum was established for Saudi-French expanding trade known as the Saudi French Business Opportunities Forum. The First Forum was successfully held in Paris in April 2013 under the auspices of BSF, and was organized by the Ministry of Commerce and Industry, in collaboration with the Ministry of Economy and Industry, the Council of Saudi Chambers, and the Saudi-French Business Council. A second meeting was held in October 12–13, 2015 in the Ritz-Carlton Riyadh, featuring France's largest corporations such as Airbus and Legrand.

== Military relations ==
France is a primary seller of arms to Saudi Arabia (after the United States and United Kingdom) and has potential to outgrow both in many fields. In Wednesday, 24 June 2015 Saudi Arabia and France agreed to sign $12 billion of deals, French Foreign Minister Laurent Fabius said that the ten contracts include 23 Airbus H145 helicopters worth $500 million. Meanwhile, Reuters reported that the Saudi defense ministry was also discussing the price for a contract for French naval patrol boats, built by DCNS. In 2015 France signed a 10B$ arms deal with Saudi Arabia to supply 30 patrol boats.

Amid the on-going war in Yemen, Saudi Arabia signed a preliminary agreement with the Naval Group of France in February 2019, to build warships, frigates, corvettes and related items in the kingdom.

In 2020, the entire delegation of French MEPs from the liberal Renew Europe group stood against the export of weapons to Saudi Arabia and the United Arab Emirates. France has reportedly supplied billions of euros worth weapons to both the Gulf nations while they were involved in the civil wars of Yemen and Libya, respectively. According to several reports published by investigative journalism and human rights groups, UAE and Saudi have caused thousands of civilian deaths in the named conflicts. The French government has sold weapons to the nations and trained their mercenaries despite the violation of arms embargo and international humanitarian law committed by the Gulf nations.

== Resident diplomatic missions ==
- France has an embassy in Riyadh and a consulate-general in Jeddah.
- Saudi Arabia has an embassy in Paris.
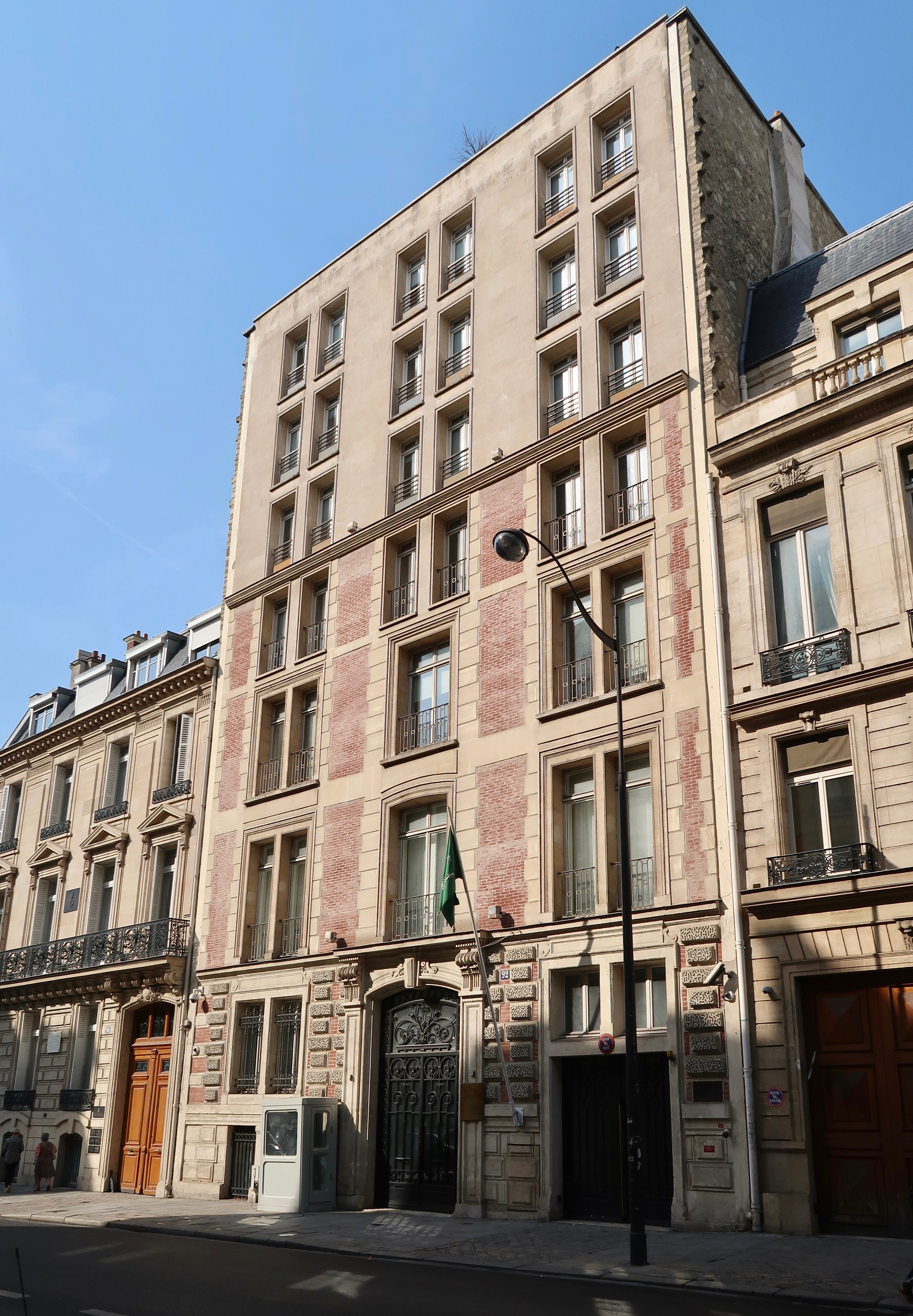
Embassy of Saudi Arabia in Paris

== See also ==
- Foreign relations of France
- Foreign relations of Saudi Arabia
