= United Nations Information Service =

United Nations Information Service (UNIS) may refer to:

- United Nations Information Service Geneva
- United Nations Information Service Vienna

== See also ==
- United Nations Information Centres
  - United Nations Information Centre for India and Bhutan
  - United Nations Information Centre Tokyo
  - United Nations Information Center Washington
