= List of United Nations organizations by location =

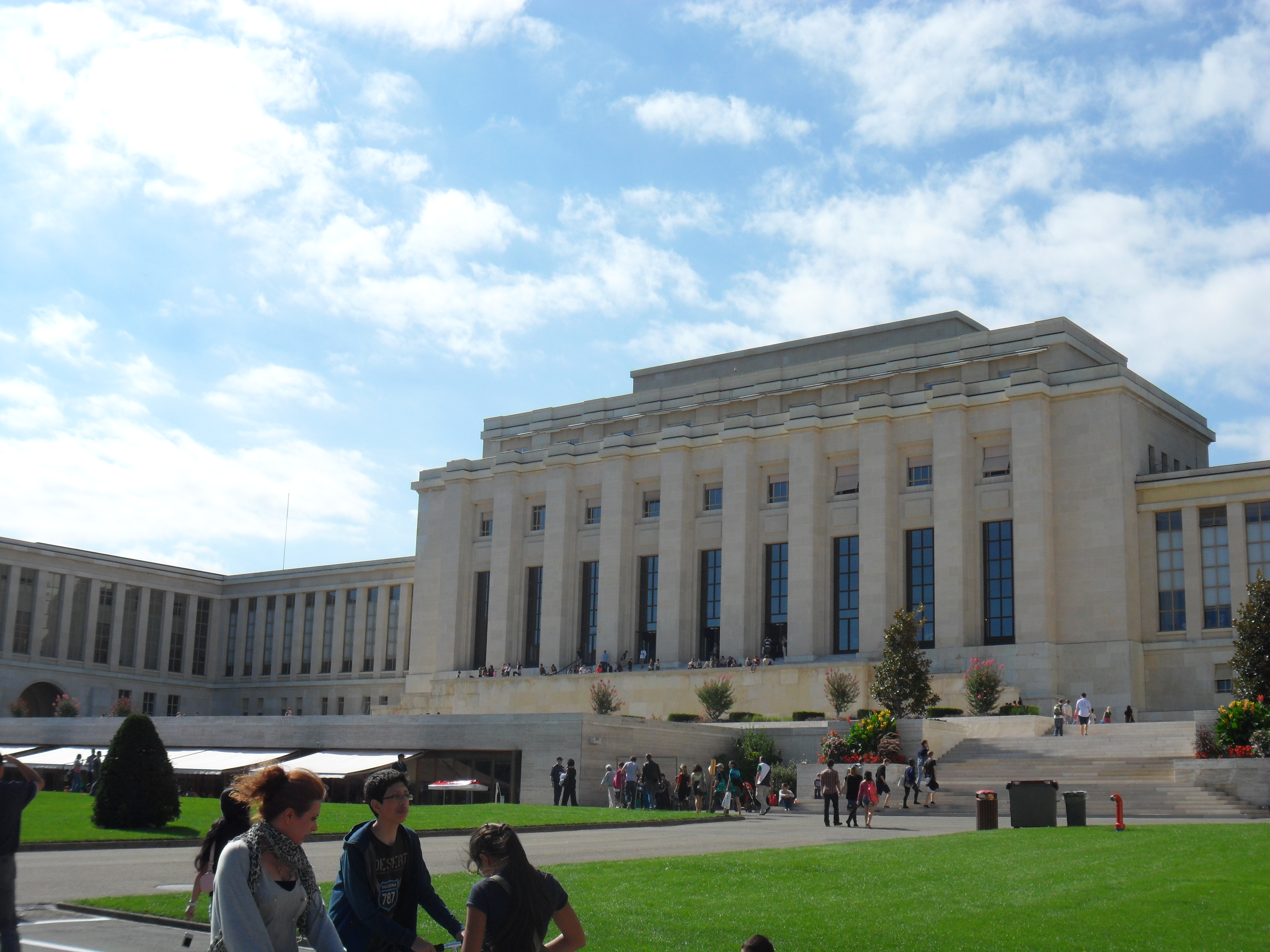
The Palace of Nations. The United Nations Office at Geneva (Switzerland) is the second most important UN centre, after the United Nations Headquarters.

While the Secretariat of the United Nations is headquartered in New York City, its many bodies, specialized agencies, and related organizations are headquartered in other parts of the world, particularly in Europe.

== Locations ==
=== Africa ===
Country	City	Organizations
Ethiopia	Addis Ababa	United Nations Economic Commission for Africa (UNECA)
Kenya	Nairobi	United Nations Environment Programme (UNEP); United Nations Human Settlements Programme (UN-Habitat); United Nations Office at Nairobi

=== Americas ===
Country	City	Organizations
Canada	Montreal	International Civil Aviation Organization (ICAO); Convention on Biological Diversity (CBD) Secretariat; UNESCO Institute for Statistics
Chile	Santiago	Economic Commission for Latin America and the Caribbean (ECLAC, UNECLAC)
Costa Rica	Ciudad Colón	University for Peace (UPEACE) (associated)
Dominican Republic	Santo Domingo	International Research and Training Institute for the Advancement of Women (INSTRAW)
Jamaica	Kingston	International Seabed Authority (ISA)
United States	New York City	United Nations Security Council (UNSC); Former Inter-Agency Committee on Sustainable Development; Inter-Agency Network on Women and Gender Equality; Inter-Agency Working Group on Evaluation; International Civil Service Commission (ICSC); Panel of External Auditors of the United Nations the Specialized Agencies and the International Atomic Energy Agency; United Nations (United Nations Secretariat); United Nations Board of Auditors; United Nations Capital Development Fund (UNCDF); United Nations Children's Fund (UNICEF) (moving to Nairobi in 2026); United Nations Communications Group; United Nations CyberSchoolBus; United Nations Development Fund for Women (UNIFEM); United Nations Development Programme (UNDP) (moving to Nairobi in 2026); United Nations Fund for International Partnerships (UNFIP); United Nations Geographic Information Working Group; United Nations Information and Communication Technologies Task Force (UN ICT TF); United Nations International School (UNIS); United Nations Joint Staff Pension Fund (UNJSPF); United Nations Mine Action Service (UNMAS); United Nations Office for Project Services (UNOPS); United Nations Population Fund (UNFPA) (moving to Nairobi in 2026); United Nations Resident Coordinators Network; United Nations Sustainable Development Group (UNSDG); United Nations System Chief Executives Board for Coordination; United Nations Women (moving to Nairobi in 2026); WomenWatch; United Nations Office for Disarmament Affairs (UNODA)
United States	Washington, D.C.	International Monetary Fund (IMF); United Nations Atlas of the Oceans; World Bank Group (WBG); International Bank for Reconstruction and Development (IBRD); International Centre for Settlement of Investment Disputes (ICSID); International Development Association (IDA); International Finance Corporation (IFC); Multilateral Investment Guarantee Agency (MIGA)

=== Asia ===
Country	City	Organizations
China	Macau	United Nations University Institute on Computing and Society (UNU-CS)
Japan	Tokyo	United Nations University (UNU)
Jordan	Amman	United Nations Relief and Works Agency for Palestine Refugees in the Near East (UNRWA) (co-located in the Gaza Strip)
Lebanon	Beirut	Economic and Social Commission for Western Asia (ESCWA)
Malaysia	Kuala Lumpur	United Nations University International Institute for Global Health
Thailand	Bangkok	Economic and Social Commission for Asia and the Pacific (ESCAP)
Turkmenistan	Ashgabat	United Nations Regional Centre for Preventive Diplomacy for Central Asia (UNRCCA)
Vietnam	Hanoi	United Nations International School of Hanoi
Nepal	Kathmandu	United Nations Regional Centre for Peace and Disarmament in Asia and the Pacific (UNRCPD)

=== Europe ===
Country	City	Organizations
Austria	Vienna	Comprehensive Nuclear-Test-Ban Treaty Organization (CTBTO) Preparatory Commission; International Atomic Energy Agency (IAEA); United Nations Commission on International Trade Law (UNCITRAL); United Nations Industrial Development Organization (UNIDO); United Nations Office at Vienna (UNOV); United Nations Office for Outer Space Affairs (UNOOSA); United Nations Office on Drugs and Crime (UNODC); United Nations Postal Administration (UNPA); United Nations Scientific Committee on the Effects of Atomic Radiation (UNSCEAR)
Denmark	Copenhagen	United Nations Office for Project Services (UNOPS)
Finland	Helsinki	United Nations University World Institute for Development Economics Research (UNU-WIDER)
France	Paris	International Institute for Educational Planning; United Nations Educational, Scientific and Cultural Organization (UNESCO)
Germany	Bonn	UN Bonn; Convention on the Conservation of Migratory Species of Wild Animals (CMS); United Nations Convention to Combat Desertification (UNCCD); United Nations Office for Disaster Risk Reduction (UNDRR); United Nations Office for Outer Space Affairs; United Nations Framework Convention on Climate Change (UNFCCC); United Nations Volunteers (UNV); United Nations Platform for Space-based Information for Disaster Management and Emergency Response (UN-SPIDER); United Nations University
Germany	Hamburg	International Tribunal for the Law of the Sea (ITLOS)
Italy	Rome	Food and Agriculture Organization of the United Nations (FAO); International Fund for Agricultural Development (IFAD); UN System Network on Rural Development and Food Security; World Food Programme (WFP)
Italy	Trieste	Abdus Salam International Centre for Theoretical Physics (ICTP); International Centre for Genetic Engineering and Biotechnology (ICGEB); International Centre for Science and High Technology (ICS)
Italy	Turin	United Nations Interregional Crime and Justice Research Institute (UNICRI); International Training Centre of the ILO (ITCILO); United Nations System Staff College (UNSSC)
Malta	Valletta	International Institute on Ageing (INIA)
Netherlands	The Hague	International Court of Justice (ICJ); International Criminal Court (ICC or ICCt); International Criminal Tribunal for the Former Yugoslavia (ICTY); Organisation for the Prohibition of Chemical Weapons (OPCW) (working relationship with United Nations)
Netherlands	Maastricht	United Nations University - Maastricht Economic and Social Research Institute on Innovation and Technology (UNU-MERIT)
Norway	Oslo	United Nations Common Supplier Database
Spain	Madrid	United Nations World Tourism Organization (UNWTO)
Sweden	Malmö	World Maritime University (WMU)
Switzerland	Bern	Universal Postal Union (UPU)
Switzerland	Geneva	Economic Commission for Europe (ECE or UNECE); Global Programme on Globalization, Liberalization and Sustainable Human Development; High Level Committee on Management; High Level Committee on Programmes; International Bureau of Education (IBE-UNESCO); International Computing Centre (UNICC); International Labour Organization (ILO); International Organization for Migration (IOM); International Strategy for Disaster Reduction (IDNDR); International Telecommunication Union (ITU); International Trade Centre (ITC); Joint Inspection Unit (JIU); Joint Inter-Agency Meeting on Computer-Assisted Translation and Terminology; Joint United Nations Programme on HIV/AIDS (UNAIDS); Office for the Coordination of Humanitarian Affairs (OCHA); ReliefWeb (RW); United Nations Compensation Commission (UNCC); United Nations Conference on Trade and Development (UNCTAD); United Nations Institute for Disarmament Research (UNIDIR); United Nations Institute for Training and Research (UNITAR); United Nations Non-Governmental Liaison Service (UN-NGLS); United Nations Office at Geneva (UNOG); United Nations Research Institute for Social Development (UNRISD); United Nations System Standing Committee on Nutrition (UNSCN); World Health Organization (WHO); World Intellectual Property Organization (WIPO); World Meteorological Organization (WMO); World Trade Organization (WTO); United Nations High Commissioner for Human Rights (OHCHR); United Nations High Commissioner for Refugees (UNHCR)
United Kingdom	London	International Maritime Organization (IMO)

== Statistics ==
Relative sizes of the main offices of the United Nations (in 2015)
Location	Number of employees in offices of the United Nations
New York City	10,000
Geneva	9,800
Nairobi	4,000
Vienna	4,000
Rome	3,200
Copenhagen	1,350

== See also ==
- List of United Nations organizations
- United Nations
- United Nations System
