= United Nations Information Service Vienna =

- Abbreviation: UNIS Vienna
- Formation: 1984; 42 years ago
- Type: United Nations Information Centre
- Legal status: Active
- Headquarters: Vienna, Austria
- Head: Director; Martin Nesirky
- Parent organization: United Nations Department of Global Communications
- Website: www.unis.unvienna.org

The United Nations Information Service Vienna (UNIS Vienna) is part of a 63-strong network of United Nations Information Centres spanning the globe, which are part of the United Nations Department of Public Information. They share a common goal: to help fulfill the substantive purposes of the United Nations by communicating the activities and concerns of the organization to the public.

UNIS Vienna plays a dual role: as UN Information Centre it serves four client countries – Austria, Hungary, Slovakia and Slovenia. By serving as the local voice of the UN in these countries, the Information Service aims to promote an informed understanding of the work and goals of the UN, by reaching out to media, government, academia, schools and civil society organizations. Furthermore, it provides public information support and promotional services to the substantive programmes of the United Nations based in Vienna. It acts as Secretariat to the UN Communications Group in Vienna.

== Guided tours and lectures ==
UNIS Vienna's Visitors Service runs daily guided tours of the UN in Vienna for some 50,000 visitors per year. The UN Office at Vienna is one of the four global UN headquarters, along with the UN Headquarters in New York, the UN Office at Geneva and the UN Office at Nairobi. Tours are offered in more than a dozen languages. The Visitors Service also organizes lecture programmes about the UN and the work of its organizations based at the Vienna International Centre (VIC).

== Media accreditation ==
UNIS Vienna issues annual accreditation to bona-fide representatives of the media who are writing on UN system issues, on the basis of certain criteria. Accredited journalists to the UN receive access to the Vienna International Centre, information on the happenings in the UN world in Vienna and beyond, invitations to events and press briefings being organized at the VIC.

== Civil society liaison ==
Over 1,500 civil society organizations with strong information programmes on issues of concern to the UN are associated with the UN Department of Public Information, linking the UN with people around the world. The NGO liaison service of UNIS Vienna maintains a distribution list of approximately 400 local NGO representatives, research institutes, political think tanks and initiatives of civil society.

== Publications and information products ==
UNIS Vienna produces a wide range of information products on the work of the UN and current international issues, including German-, Hungarian-, Slovak- and Slovene-language versions of press releases, backgrounders and the UN Secretary-General's statements, as well as information on the work of the Vienna-based organizations in English and other languages. All publications are available on UNIS website.

== Library and reference assistance ==
The UNIS library is a repository of information from all over the UN System. Reference documents, Security Council resolutions, the latest sales publications, the latest UN reports and more are available in the library, along with UN posters and handout material on a variety of subjects. The UNIS reference library in Vienna is open to visitors, journalists and students (upon prior appointment) and to all UN staff members. A wide range of reference material on all aspects of the UN System is available, especially on issues dealt with by the Vienna-based UN organizations dealing with drugs control, crime prevention and outer space affairs. Information and promotional material (handouts, reports, posters) as well as sales publications in limited quantities are available free of charge. The UNIS library can also help interested individuals and institutions to find a UN document.
