= UN Sacco Ltd =

UN banking services provider

United Nations Deposit Taking Sacco Society (UN SACCO) Limited is a credit union founded in 1975 initially to provide banking services to United Nations employees in Kenya but has since expanded to serve staff of diplomatic missions and select international organizations. The Sacco is based in Gigiri, Nairobi and now has members worldwide. Membership is open to all staff of UN agencies, staff of diplomatic missions and staff of select international organisations.

The organization started with 131 members in 1975 and had 6,916 by December 2023. In the same period, members' deposits grew from KES 290,000 to KES 13.7 billion. The total asset capitalization by end of 2023 stood at KES 17.9 billion (US$136 million) while the share capital is at KES 1.2 billion.

CPA Dr. Nebart Avutswa is the chief executive officer.

== Milestones ==
- The Sacco businesses commenced in 1975 under the Chairmanship of Ms. Teresa Muigai. Subsequent Chairpersons are: Mr. John Nyaga, Mr. Alexander Alusa, Ms. Mary Githiomi, Ms. Mary Odhiambo, Mr. Kimani Macharia, Mr. Dennis Kerina and Eng. Samuel Olago.
- The business office was in UNON block G with a workforce of four staff and a membership of 131 and a share capital (members' deposits) of KES 290,354
- The objective was and has been to provide a forum for members to consolidate part of their disposable income and benefits by saving and borrowing from the society at minimal cost to meet their socio-economic needs.
- The society has grown from 131 members in 1975 to the 6,916 members be end of 2023
- The society's asset base as of Dec 2023 stood at KES 17.968 billion with member deposits at KES 13.7 billion, with a loan book of KES 11.09 billion
- The UN SACCO has 2 offices. One, UN SACCO Block is located in UNON was built in 2004 and opened on 7 December 2004.

The second office UN SACCO CENTRE was acquired in late 2022 after a Special General Meeting and moved in on 22 May 2023.

- The website www.unsacco.org was launched in 2004
- The FOSA started operations in 2006
- The average weighted moving average dividend on share capital is 13% p.a. and interest on Deposits (Savings) is 10% p.a.
- In the Cooperative movement in Kenya, the UN Sacco is the 9th largest Sacco in terms of asset base; it was among the pioneer 7 Sacco's which were the first to be registered by Sacco Societies Regulatory Authority (SASRA) after fulfilling all the required conditions; SASRA is to the Cooperative movement what the central bank is to the banking industry.
- There are 18 loan products offered by the SACCO.
- To enable its member access their funds easily the Sacco has partnered with Cooperative Bank of Kenya to offer Debit VISA ATM cards (SACCO-LINK), which enables members to access funds from any VISA accepted ATM globally.
- The UN Sacco also launched an online banking platform and a mobile App in January 2023. This enables members to monitor their accounts from anywhere anytime. Members can also transfer funds from their accounts using the App to their mobile money wallets MPesa.
