= United Nations Information Service at Geneva =

The United Nations Information Service at Geneva (UNIS Geneva) is part of a network of United Nations Information Centres across the world working to promote greater public understanding of the aims and activities of the United Nations.

UNIS Geneva operates from the United Nations Office at Geneva, the second-biggest of the four major office sites of the United Nations (UN) after the UN's main headquarters in New York (the other two are the Offices in Vienna and Nairobi). It is also the United Nations Information Centre for Switzerland.

The Service provides information services focusing primarily on Geneva-based United Nations activities in the field of human rights, disarmament, development and economic and social issues. It bears a special responsibility for informing the press and the general public on the UN's human rights activities due to the location in Geneva of the Office of the High Commissioner for Human Rights and of the annual meetings of the Human Rights Council. UNIS Geneva also highlights disarmament efforts, reporting on the work of the Conference on Disarmament, which meets in Geneva and is the world's sole multilateral forum for disarmament negotiations. Relief assistance is also a focus of the Service's work, Geneva being the world capital of humanitarian activity.

== Press services ==
UNIS Geneva also conveys the United Nations' position on matters in the news through its briefings, official statements, interviews, and background briefings. It provides breaking news and in-depth material to international print and audiovisual media.

The Service produces a wide range of information products on the work of the United Nations and current international issues, including meeting summaries, press releases, backgrounders, and statements. All publications are available on the UNIS webpage.

It produces text, radio, television, and photo material on events in Geneva and related field activities.

UNIS Geneva provides annual accreditation to representatives of the media who are covering UN system issues. Accredited journalists receive access to the United Nations Office at Geneva, information on UN events and activities in Geneva and in the world, and can participate in events and press briefings being organized at the Office.

Furthermore, UNIS Geneva provides services for press conferences and briefings held by organisations of the United Nations system based in Geneva, including the International Labour Organization (ILO), the International Telecommunication Union (ITU), the Office for the Coordination of Humanitarian Affairs (OCHA), the Office of the United Nations High Commissioner for Human Rights (OHCHR), the Office of the United Nations High Commissioner for Refugees (UNHCR), the World Health Organization (WHO), the World Intellectual Property Organization (WIPO), the World Meteorological Organization (WMO), the United Nations Conference on Trade and Development (UNCTAD), and the United Nations Economic Commission for Europe (UNECE).

== Guided tours ==
UNIS Geneva is also responsible for guided tours of the Palais des Nations, which is the headquarters of the United Nations Office at Geneva, with over 100,000 visitors each year.

The tour of the Palais des Nations - built in the 1930s for the League of Nations - includes meeting rooms such as the Assembly Hall, the Human Rights and Alliance of Civilizations Room, the Salle des Pas Perdus, and the Council Chamber.

== Information programmes ==
The UN Information Service at Geneva offers lectures by UN staff members on the UN in general and the work of the Geneva-based specialized agencies. The information programmes are prepared for groups coming from all parts of the world and composed of university students, diplomats, public servants and representatives of non-governmental organizations or other associations. The themes of the programmes range from human rights and humanitarian affairs to disarmament and peacekeeping operations.

The Information Service at Geneva also holds a graduate study programme each year during the first three weeks of July, providing an opportunity for postgraduate students from all over the world to deepen their understanding of the United Nations and its related agencies through first-hand observation and study at the United Nations Office at Geneva.

== Information centres ==
The United Nations Information Centres (UNICs) system was established in 1946. It currently operates in 63 countries through its regional centers which are known as United Nations Regional Information Centres (UNRIC). Its headquarters is located in New York. The UNIC's operations are directed by the United Nations Department of Global Communications (DGC).

UNICs are established to bridge communication gaps between the United Nations and the people of the world. They provide a wide scope of media outreach to raise and spread the voice of the United Nations, as well as to increase public awareness of the United Nations system globally. The regional centres disseminate United Nations news and issues to the people by translating them into regional languages. They also organize events, memorial days, national and international days to increase awareness through various activities including competition for drawing, sports, art, and craft in thematic manners.
