= LeMouvement =

Le Mouvement
- Founded: 2013
- Founders: Romain Cayla (Romano), Riks, Tiez
- Type: Artist collective
- Headquarters: Paris, France
- Fields: Street art

Le Mouvement (stylized as LeMouvement) is a street art collective founded in Paris in 2013 by Romain Cayla (alias Romano), Thomas Fansten (alias Riks), and Thomas Dejean (alias Tiez). It brings together painters, graffiti artists, illustrators, photographers, videographers, set designers, and visual artists. The collective's work is rooted in a reflection on urban space, social diversity, and living together.

== History ==
The collective emerged in Paris around 2013. Its project “Les Parapluies du Mouvement” (“The Umbrellas of the Movement”) gained attention in the cultural press, including *Les Inrockuptibles*, which described it as a poetic way of “bringing Parisians closer together” through simple artistic gestures.

Pasted directly onto the streets of Paris, these photographic portraits created a visual dialogue with residents. According to local cultural reporting, more than 250 couples were depicted as part of the series.

Originally carried out as an independent street art initiative, “Les Parapluies” was later supported by public institutions. The collective received commissions from the City of Paris and took part in the 2014 and 2015 editions of the all-night festival *Nuit Blanche*. The group also produced installations and artistic interventions for the French Ministry of Culture.

== Artistic approach ==
Le Mouvement promotes a participatory approach to street art. Its interventions, based on photographic collage, explore themes such as cultural diversity, the reception of refugees, intercultural dialogue, and collective memory.

The collective's work combines monumental collages, mural paintings, and open workshops with local residents. Many interventions are carried out in public space during the day, interacting directly with passers-by, and sometimes involving the photographed participants themselves.

== Notable projects ==
- Les Parapluies (Paris, 2013–) — ongoing installation of photographic portraits of Parisian couples.
- Au bout du tunnel (Pantin) — open-air exhibition commissioned by the city of Pantin in collaboration with the association Banane Pantin.
- Nuit Blanche 2015: Refugees Welcome — installation at Les Blancs-Manteaux in partnership with Emmaüs Solidarité.
- Hommage aux victimes du 13 novembre 2015 — artistic commission from the French Ministry of Culture.
- Festival de Cannes (2016) — participation in the official Directors’ Fortnight poster, designed by Cécile Burban using a Le Mouvement collage.
- Hommage à Jean Gabin (2019) — monumental collage in Seine-Saint-Denis as part of the Été du Canal programme.
- Danse (Paris 19) (2021) — mural created on rue d’Aubervilliers with local dance associations and authorised by Le Centquatre-104.
- La folle journée street art à Beyrouth (2023) — major participatory project commissioned by the Institut Français du Liban, featuring 40 artworks across Beirut.
- Urban Art Fair Paris (2023) — production of fifteen outdoor artworks for the fair's organizers.
- Rêves de cité (Paris 20, Paris 13) (2023) — community exhibitions in collaboration with Paris Habitat and local municipalities.
- Refugees Welcome (2019–2025) — series of public-space interventions in refugee shelters, in partnership with Emmaüs Solidarité.

== Reception ==
The collective's work has been covered by several cultural and general-interest media outlets, including Les Inrockuptibles, Melty, and Le Petit Journal.

Their projects have also been highlighted by Seine-Saint-Denis Tourisme (Tourisme93), which promotes their public-space interventions.
