= Kosovo–Saudi Arabia relations =

- Kosovo: Saudi Arabia

Diplomatic mission
- Embassy of Kosovo, Riyadh: none

Envoy
- Ambassador Lulzim Mjeku: none

Kosovo–Saudi Arabia relations are foreign relations between the Kosovo and Saudi Arabia. Like Saudi Arabia, Kosovo has a mainly Muslim population.

== History ==
The Socialist Autonomous Province of Kosovo was an autonomous province of the Republic of Serbia during the Socialist Federal Republic of Yugoslavia (1946–92), and then of Serbia during the Federal Republic of Yugoslavia. Up until 1999 Saudi Arabia had no investments in, nor any direct relationship with, the province. During the Kosovo War (1998–99), the Saudi government expressed support for the Kosovar Albanians, although it stopped short of supporting military action by NATO. During the UN administration, Saudi Arabian organizations sought to establish a cultural foothold in Kosovo.

Kosovo declared its independence from Serbia on 17 February 2008 and Saudi Arabia recognised it on 20 April 2009. Saudi Arabia has a Liaison Office in Pristina and Kosovo planned to open an embassy in Riyadh later. On 22 December 2009, Saudi ambassador Abdullah Abdulaziz (who is also ambassador to Albania and to the Republic of North Macedonia) presented his credentials to Kosovar President Fatmir Sejdiu.

On 25 May 2009, at the Organisation of the Islamic Conference's 36th session of the Council of Foreign Ministers in Damascus, the 57 member states adopted a resolution that noted Kosovo's declaration of independence, upheld the role of the United Nations in Kosovo, reaffirmed the strong interest of the OIC regarding Muslims in the Balkans, welcomed the co-operation of Kosovo with the OIC Economic and Financial institutions, and called on the international community to continue contributing to the fostering of Kosovo's economy. Saudi Arabia was one of the main Islamic states backing this resolution and it has been reported that an earlier draft of the resolution (tabled by Saudi Arabia) had called for recognition of Kosovo by Islamic countries, but this was rejected by some member states, including Syria, Egypt and Azerbaijan.

Saudi Arabia spoke in support of Kosovo at the International Court of Justice's oral debate on the legality of Kosovo's independence in 2009.

== Islam in Kosovo ==
Like Saudi Arabia, Kosovo has a mainly Muslim population. The traditional Islam in Kosovo is the Hanafi school, described as 'liberal' and 'moderate'.

== See also ==
- Foreign relations of Kosovo
- Foreign relations of Saudi Arabia
- Saudi Arabia–Serbia relations

== Sources ==
- Testa, Andrew (2016-05-21). "How Kosovo Was Turned Into Fertile Ground for ISIS". New York Times.
