= United Nations Office at Geneva =

One of four major United Nations offices

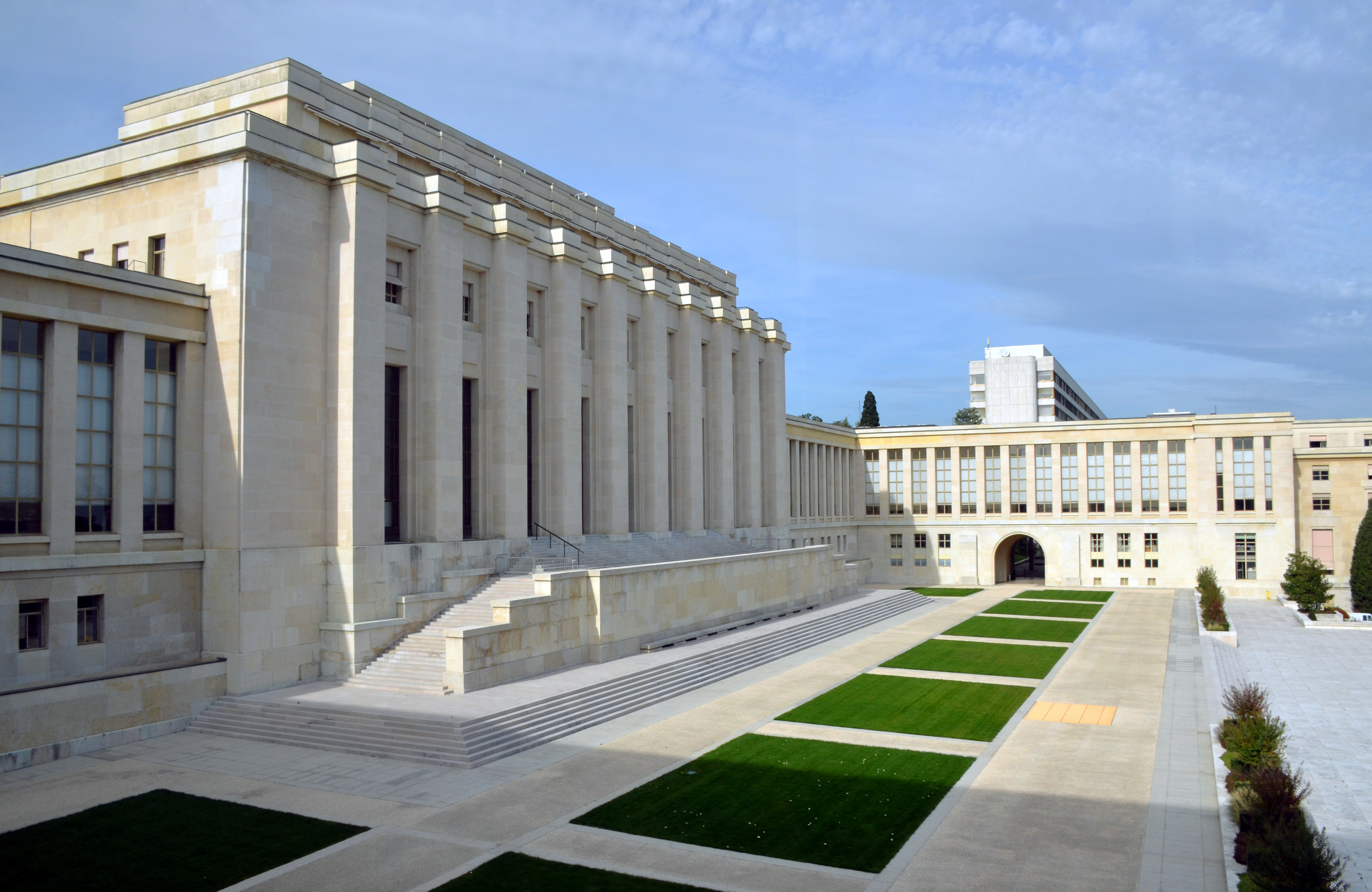
- The Palace of Nations, the main building of the United Nations Office at Geneva

- Location within Switzerland
- Alternative names: UNOG

General information
- Location: Palais des Nations, 1211 Geneva, Switzerland
- Coordinates: 46.226667°N 6.140556°E

Website
- https://www.ungeneva.org/en

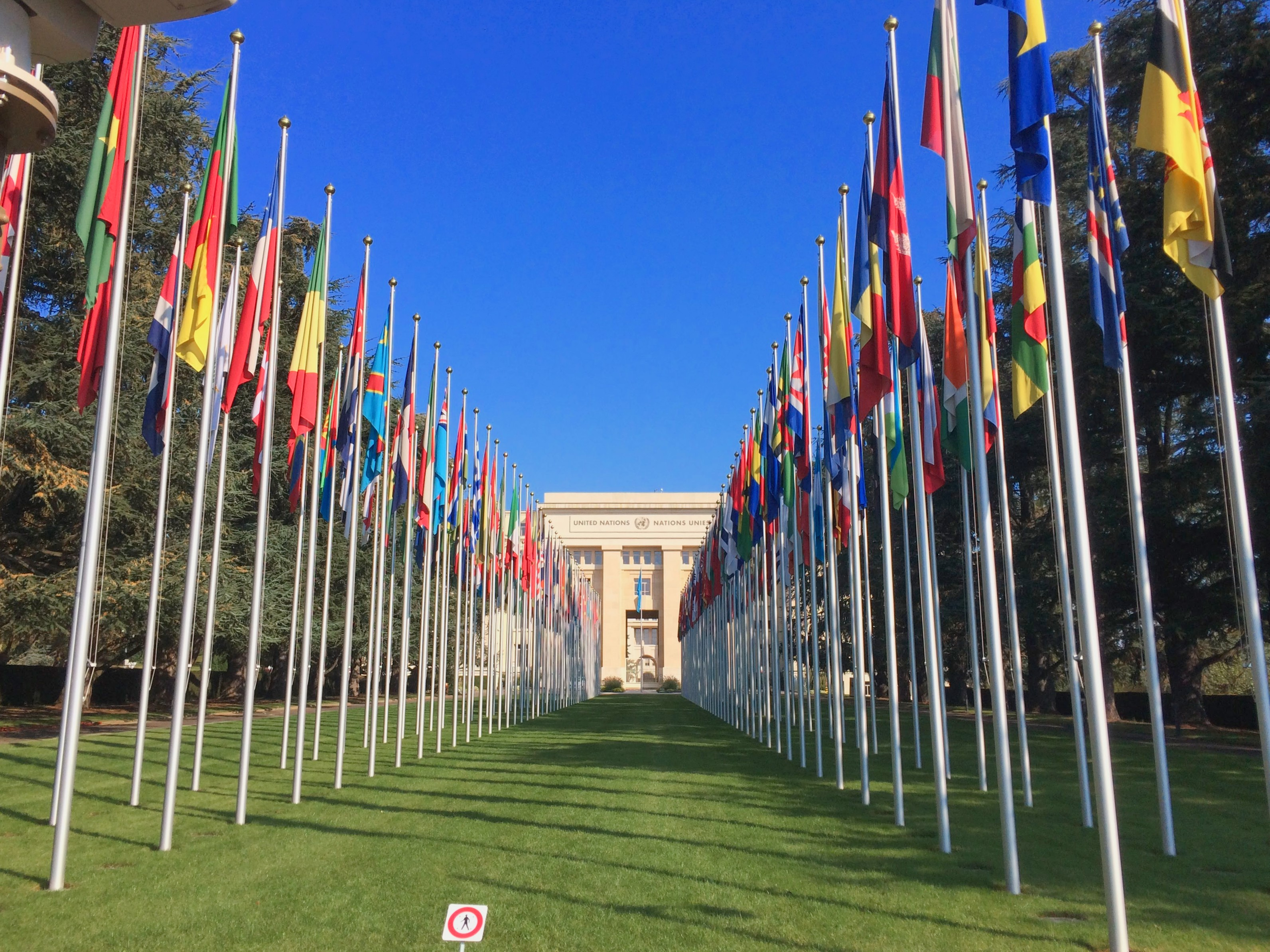
The Allée des Nations, with the flags of the member countries

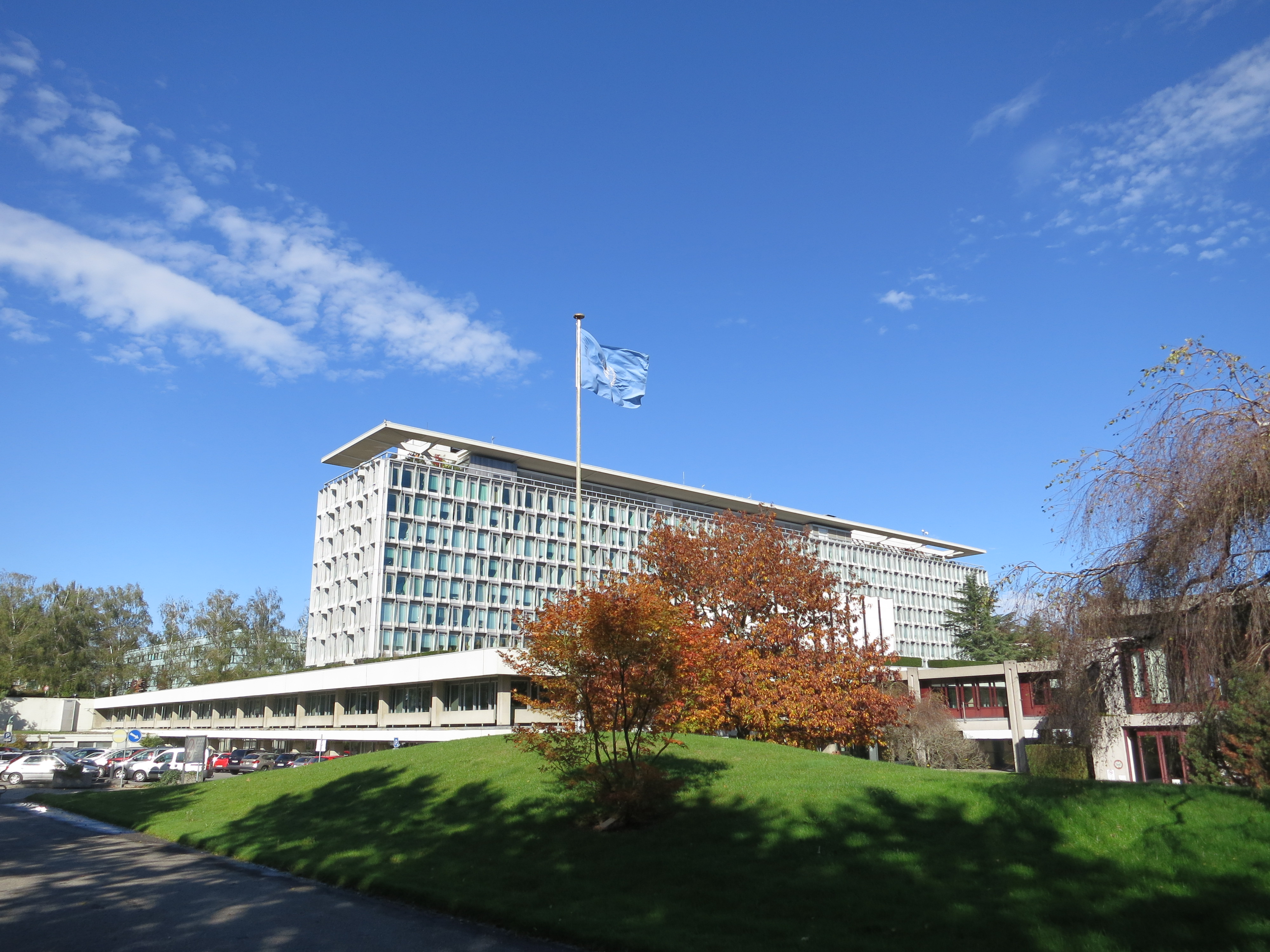
The headquarters of the World Health Organization

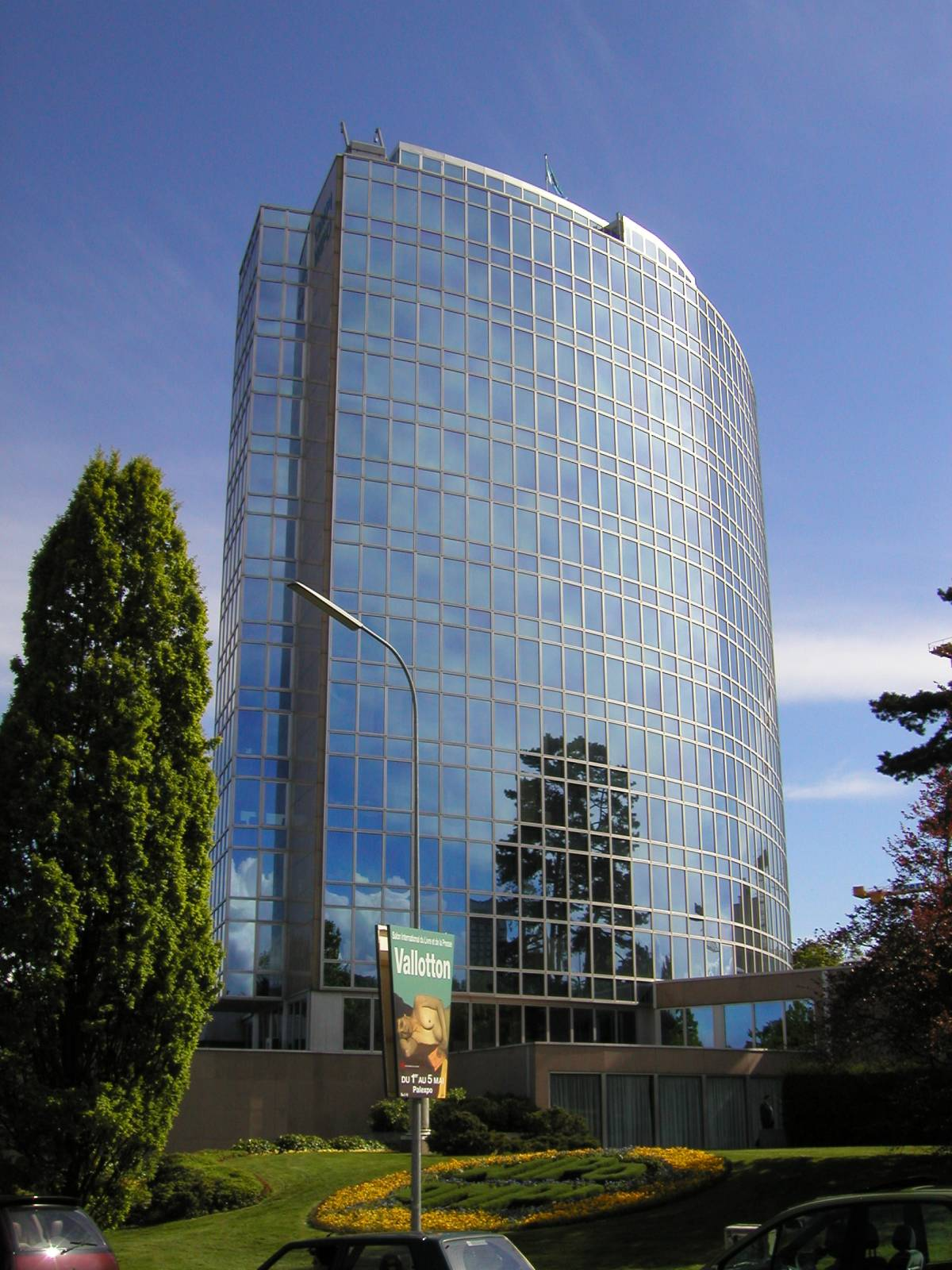
World Intellectual Property Organization headquarters

The United Nations Office at Geneva (UNOG; French: Office des Nations unies à Genève) is one of the four major offices (Note: The others being in New York City, Nairobi and Vienna) of the United Nations where numerous different UN agencies have a joint presence, located in Geneva. The main UNOG administrative offices are located inside the Palace of Nations complex, which was originally constructed for the League of Nations between 1929 and 1938.

Besides United Nations administration, the Palais des Nations also hosts the offices for a number of programmes and funds such as the United Nations Conference on Trade and Development (UNCTAD), the United Nations Office for the Coordination of Humanitarian Affairs (OCHA) and the United Nations Economic Commission for Europe (ECE).

The United Nations and its specialized agencies, programmes and funds may have other offices or functions hosted outside the Palais des Nations, normally in office spaces provided by the Swiss government.

UN specialised agencies and other UN entities with offices in Geneva hold bi-weekly briefings at the Palais des Nations, organized by the United Nations Information Service at Geneva.

UNOG produces an annual report where it lists all major events and activities that happened through a year.

The United Nations Library & Archives Geneva is part of UNOG.

== Constituent agencies ==
=== Headquartered in Geneva ===
- Conference on Disarmament
- International Bureau of Education
- International Computing Centre
- International Labour Organization
- International Organization for Migration
- International Trade Centre
- International Telecommunication Union
- Joint Inspection Unit
- Joint United Nations Programme on HIV/AIDS
- Office of the United Nations High Commissioner for Human Rights
- United Nations Chief Executives Board for Coordination
- United Nations Compensation Commission
- United Nations Conference on Trade and Development
- United Nations Economic Commission for Europe
- United Nations High Commissioner for Refugees
- United Nations Human Rights Council (see also United Nations Commission on Human Rights)
- United Nations Institute for Disarmament Research
- United Nations Institute for Training and Research
- United Nations Non-Governmental Liaison Service
- United Nations Office for the Coordination of Humanitarian Affairs
- United Nations Office on Sport for Development and Peace
- United Nations Research Institute For Social Development
- World Health Organization
- World Intellectual Property Organization
- World Meteorological Organization
- World Trade Organization

=== Presence at Geneva ===
- Food and Agriculture Organization of the United Nations (headquarters in Rome)
- International Atomic Energy Agency (headquarters are in Vienna)
- United Nations Environment Programme (headquarters are in Nairobi)
- United Nations Educational, Scientific and Cultural Organization (headquarters are in Paris)
- United Nations Industrial Development Organization (headquarters are in Vienna)
- World Food Programme (headquarters are in Rome)
- United Nations World Tourism Organization (headquarters in Madrid)

== Directors-general ==
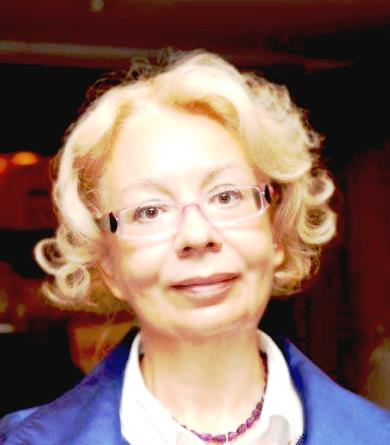
Tatiana Valovaya, Russia, Director-General since 2019.

1. Wladimir Moderow, Poland, 1946–1951
2. Adriaan Pelt, Netherlands, 1952–1957
3. Pier Pasquale Spinelli, Italy, 1957–1968
4. Vittorio Winspeare-Guicciardi, Italy, 1968–1978
5. Luigi Cottafavi, Italy, 1978–1983
6. Eric Suy, Belgium, 1983–1987
7. Jan Mårtenson, Sweden, 1987–1992
8. Antoine Blanca, France, 1992–1993
9. Vladimir Petrovsky, Russia, 1993–2002
10. Sergei Ordzhonikidze, Russia, 2002–2011
11. Kassym-Jomart Tokayev, Kazakhstan, 2011–2013
12. Michael Møller, Denmark, 2013–2019
13. Tatiana Valovaya, Russia, 2019–present

== Administrative history ==
1. United Nations Geneva Office, from beginning, Aug 1946 – Apr 1947, (IC/Geneva/1)
2. European Office of the UN, 11 Apr 1947 – 10 Aug 1948, (IC/Geneva/49)
3. United Nations Office at Geneva, 10 Aug 1948 – 9 Aug 1949, (IC/Geneva/152)
4. European Office of the UN, 9 Aug 1949 – 8 Dec 1957, (SGB/82/Rev.1)
5. United Nations Office at Geneva, 8 December 1957 – present, (SGB/82/Rev.2)

== See also ==
- Headquarters of the United Nations (New York City)
- United Nations Information Service at Geneva
- United Nations Office at Vienna
- United Nations Office at Nairobi
- Outline of the United Nations
- List of United Nations organizations by location
- List of international organizations based in Geneva

== Bibliography ==
- Joëlle Kuntz, Geneva and the Call of Internationalism: A History, Éditions Zoé, 2011, 96 pages (ISBN 978-2-88182-855-3).
