= List of ambassadors of Iran to United Nations Office at Vienna =

Coordinates: 48.197099°N 16.384112°E

Permanent Representative of Iran next the United Nations Office at Vienna
- Persian: نماینده دائم جمهوری اسلامی ایران در دفتر سازمان ملل متحد در وین
- Coat of Arms of Iran
- Incumbent; Mohsen Naziri Asl since August 16, 2022
- Inaugural holder: Ali Asghar Soltanieh
- Formation: 1983

The Iranian Permanent Representative next the United Nations Office at Vienna is the official representative of the Government in Tehran next the

- International Atomic Energy Agency (IAEA)
- United Nations Industrial Development Organization (UNIDO)
- United Nations Office on Drugs and Crime (UNODC)
- United Nations High Commissioner for Refugees (UNHCR)

in the Vienna International Centre.

== List of representatives ==
Diplomatic accreditation	Diplomatic accreditation Solar Hijri calendar	Permanent Representative	Persian language	Observations	List of presidents of Iran	Term end	Term end Solar Hijri calendar
1983	1361	Ali Asghar Soltanieh	علی‌اصغر سلطانیه	Iranian representative to the International Atomic Energy Agency.	Ali Khamenei	1988	1366
1988	1366	Khalil Moosavi Bioki	سید خلیل موسوی بیوکی	Iranian representative to the International Atomic Energy Agency.	Ali Khamenei	1993	1371
1993	1371	Mohammad Sadegh Ayatollahi	محمدصادق آیت‌اللهی	Iranian representative to the International Atomic Energy Agency.	Akbar Hashemi Rafsanjani	1999	1377
1999	1377	Ali Akbar Salehi	علی‌اکبر صالحی	Iranian representative to the International Atomic Energy Agency.	Mohammad Khatami	2004	1382
2004	1382	Pirooz Hosseini	پیروز حسینی	(10/01/1958) Pirooz Hosseini Ambassador Extraordinary and Plenipotentiary Permanent Mission of the Islamic Republic of Iran to the United Nations (Vienna)	Mohammad Khatami	2006	1384
2005	1383	Mohammad Mehdi Akhondzadeh	محمدمهدی آخوندزاده		Mahmoud Ahmadinejad	2005	1383
February 7, 2006	1385	Ali-Asghar Soltanieh	علی‌اصغر سلطانیه		Mahmoud Ahmadinejad	2014	1392
2014	1392	Reza Najafi	رضا نجفی	Director General of the Department of International Peace and Security of Ministry of Foreign Affairs, Reza Najafi,	Hassan Rouhani	July 1, 2018	1397
July 1, 2018	1397	Kazem Gharib Abadi		In 1996 he headed the Asia and Pacific Division at the Parliament.; From 2003 to 2005 he was Director of Communications and International Affairs at the IRIB World Service; From 2005 to 2009 he was Advisor to the Minister of Foreign Affairs in disarmament and nuclear affairs; From 2005 to 2009 he was Deputy Director General for Political Affairs at the Ministry of Foreign Affairs.; From 2010 to 2014 he was Iranian ambassador to the Netherlands and concurrently Permanent Representative to the Organisation for the Prohibition of Chemical Weapons (OPCW), and International Legal Organizations based in The Hague.; From 2014 to 2018 he was Deputy Secretary General of the High Council for Human Rights in International Affairs and International Judicial Cooperation.; From 2014 to 2018 he was Chairman of the National Committee for the Universal Periodic Review and Chair of the Human Rights Coordinating Committee.; From 2015 to 2018 he was Chief of the Joint Comprehensive Plan of Action (JCPOA), the Nuclear Committee, and in the Supreme National Security Council.; In 1996 he became Bachelor in Political Relations and in 1998 a Master in Diplomacy and International Organizations, both obtained at the College of International Relations, Ministry of Foreign Affairs. In 2017 he was graduated as a PhD in Public Law from Allameh Tabatabaei University.	Hassan Rouhani	2021	1400
2021	1400	Mohammad Reza Ghaebi	محمدرضا غائبی	Acting Head of Mission and Charge d’Affaires	Ebrahim Raisi	2022	1401
August 16, 2022	1401	Mohsen Naziri Asl	محسن نذیری‌اصل		Ebrahim Raisi		

== See also ==
- Atomic Energy Organization of Iran
- Nuclear program of Iran
- Scholars Pavilion
