= Gigiri =

Neighborhood in Nairobi, Kenya

Coordinates: 1°15′S 36°48′E

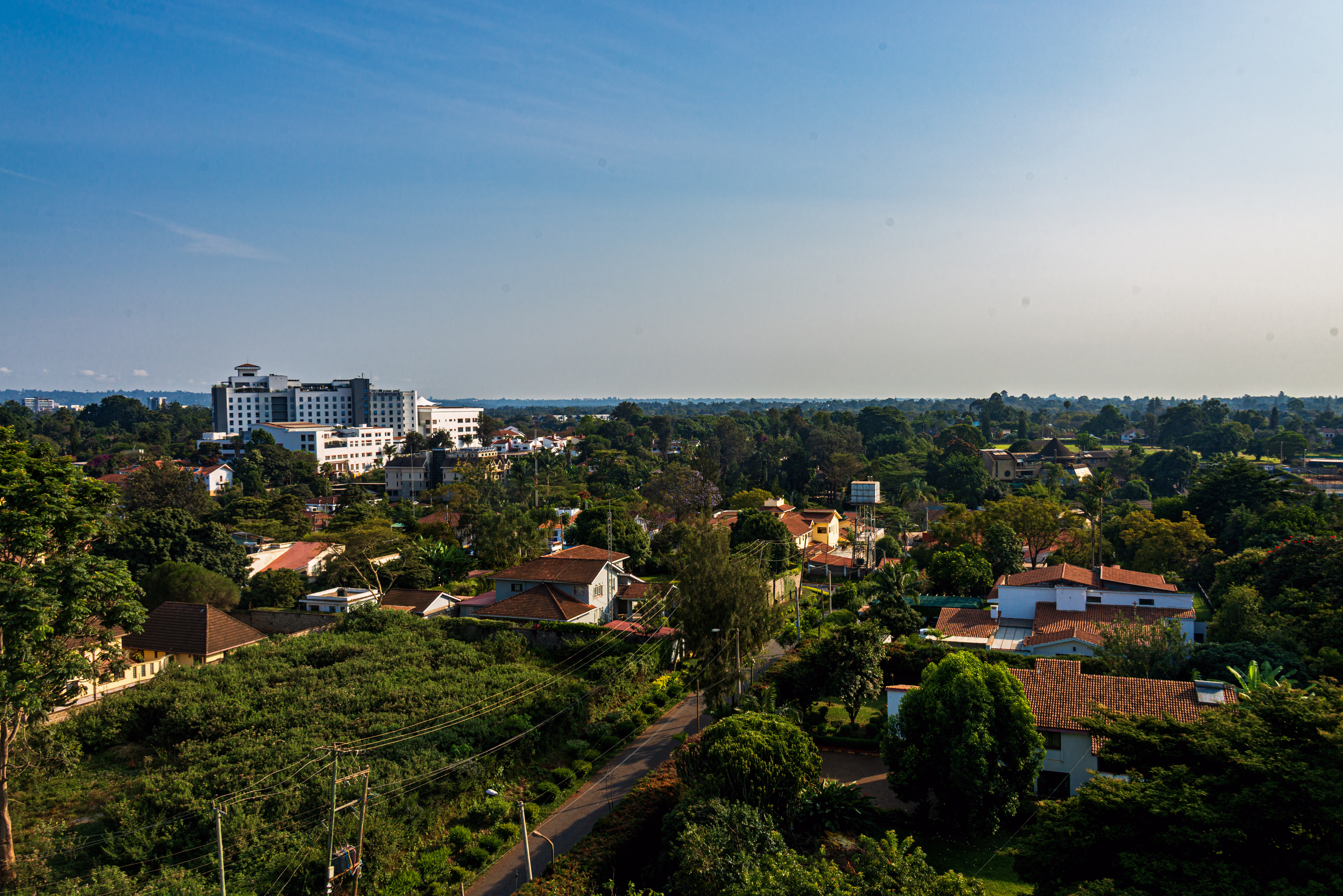
Gigiri (2025) from the Gem Hotel

Gigiri is a residential estate in Nairobi. It is home to Kenya's large expatriate community. It is one of the largest expat communities in Africa. Gigiri hosts:

- United Nations Office at Nairobi making Nairobi the only African city to host several UN bodies i.e.
  - United Nations Environment Programme
  - United Nations Human Settlements Programme
- Embassy of the United States, Nairobi
- Chile, Malaysia, Oman, Poland and Senegal also have their embassies in Gigiri
- The International Civil Aviation Organization's Eastern and Southern African (ESAF) Office, located in the UN Office.

It also hosts The Village Market which is a large shopping, recreation and entertainment complex and UN Sacco Ltd which is one of the biggest SACCOs (credit unions) in Kenya. Gigiri is considered one of Kenya's most posh suburbs along with Runda and Muthaiga, which are located close by.
