= Romain Cayla =

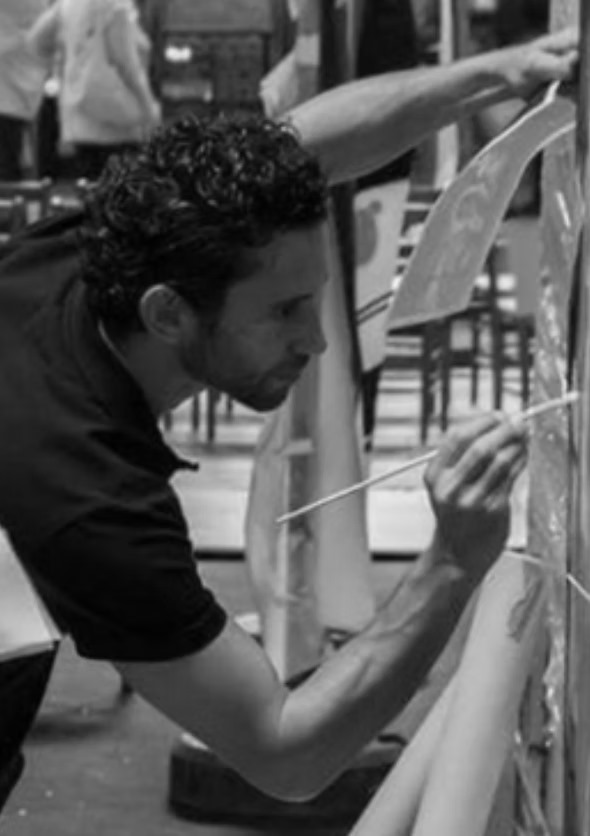
- Romain Cayla working on a mural (2023)
- Born: 22 July 1982 (age 43); Paris, France
- Known for: Visual art, street art, narrative figuration
- Website: www.romanoartist.com

Romain Cayla, known as Romano or Romanoartist, was born in 1982 in Paris, is a French visual artist active in narrative figuration, recognized for his artistic interventions on canvas and in public space, as well as for his participation in the independent Parisian street art collective Le Mouvement.

== Biography ==
Romano was born in 1982 in Paris. He attended evening classes at the École nationale supérieure des Beaux-Arts in Paris while working as an art director in a communication agency.

== Artistic career ==
In 2013, Romano co-founded the Paris-based collective Le Mouvement together with artists Riks and Tiez. The group focuses on fostering connections between citizens through urban art and collaborative practices. Among their most notable projects is Les Parapluies ("The Umbrellas"), a series of photographic collages portraying Parisian couples under umbrellas, displayed across various neighborhoods of the city.

In 2017, Romano created a monumental mural entitled Gabin & Aïssa on the façade of Point Éphémère in Paris (3 × 5 m). The work stages a symbolic encounter between actor Jean Gabin and a contemporary woman, Aïssa, set against a stained-glass background combining references to the three monotheistic religions. Through this dialogue between classical heritage and popular culture, Romano seeks to highlight diversity and question the idea of living together in French society. In the same spirit of inclusiveness, he painted a mural on the wall of the first refugee reception center at Porte de la Chapelle in Paris, underscoring his commitment to inclusion and intercultural dialogue. In 2018, he took part in an international art project in Hong Kong, where the city's tramway was covered with street art, reflecting his involvement in the global urban art scene.

Alongside his work as a visual artist, Romain Cayla has also established himself as a producer in contemporary art, street art, music, and cinema. Through the association Européens Sans Frontières, which he directs, he develops and produces projects that combine artistic creation, civic engagement, and cultural innovation. His productions include transnational campaigns of animated films and street art works created in collaboration with international press cartoonists (notably Cartooning for Peace), and broadcast by media outlets such as Arte, France Télévisions, Euronews, and Canal+.

In the field of street art, he has collaborated with European artists and collectives to create large-scale murals in public spaces, in partnership with cultural institutions such as the Centre Pompidou, Paris Habitat, and the City of Paris. As a producer attentive to the educational dimension, he also develops digital tools such as virtual museums (for example, the Ode2Joy+ project in partnership with the Universal Museum of Art) and educational kits distributed at the European level.

His works embody a fusion of French classicism and 1990s hip-hop culture, a duality that informs his exploration of social cohesion and diversity.

== Techniques and style ==
Drawing from both 1990s hip-hop and French classical art, Romano creates works that explore the intersection of tradition and contemporary urban culture, highlighting questions of social cohesion and diversity.

== Exhibitions and public interventions ==
- 2013 : Launch of the project Les Parapluies in Paris, a series of collages depicting Parisian couples under umbrellas, displayed across various districts.
- 2017 : Presentation of the collective Le Mouvement’s work in French media specializing in street art.
- 2018 : Participation in an international street art project in Hong Kong, where the city's tramway was adorned with murals and collages by international artists, including Romano.
- 2019 : Creation of a monumental mural depicting a bear on the quays of Auxerre, as part of the Rencontres Auxerroises du Développement Durable.
- 2019 : he event was also covered by local press, highlighting Romano's participation alongside other artists in raising awareness of sustainable development.

== Exhibitions in Galleries ==
- 2017: Vivre, group show, Artelie Gallery, Paris, France; Change, group show, Modus Art Gallery, Paris, France
- 2018: Urban Art Fair Paris, solo show, Paris, France
- 2019: Annual Show, group show, OD Gallery, Amsterdam, Netherlands; Dehors dedans, group show, WallWorks Gallery, Paris, France
- 2020: Urban Art Fair New York, group show, New York, USA; Urban Art Fair Paris, solo show, Paris, France
- 2022: Collages, commissioned by curators Mabille & Chaumette in collaboration with the French Consulate, presented at Art Basel Hong Kong, China
- 2023: Group show, Elya Gallery, Paris, France
- 2024: Urban Art Fair Paris, group show, international urban art fair, Paris, France

== Commissions and competitions ==
- 2019: Hockney Revisited, commissioned by the Paris Tourist Office and the Centre Pompidou; Gauguin Revisited, commissioned by the Paris Tourist Office and the Réunion des Musées Nationaux – Grand Palais; Rubens Revisited, commissioned by the Paris Tourist Office and the Musée du Luxembourg
- 2021: Refugees Welcome Porte de la Chapelle, commissioned by Emmaüs Solidarité, Fraternité Générale, and Quai36, Paris; Reportage JT France 3 on the legalization of street art, commissioned by France Télévisions; Bubbles, commissioned by La Bellevilloise, Paris; Don't Clean Street Art, commissioned by the Welling Court Mural Project, Queens, New York; Welcome to Tirana, commissioned by the Center of Openness and Dialogue, Tirana, Albania
- 2022: Power and Love, commissioned by Mabille & Chaumette with the French Consulate, Focus Art Basel program, Hong Kong; Morgane et Adamo, group exhibition, Église Saint-Merry, Paris (City Hall of the 4th arrondissement)
- 2023: Aïssa et Gabin, group exhibition Été du canal de l’Ourcq, competition by the Seine-Saint-Denis Tourist Office, Paris
- 2024: L’Arche de Noé, monumental mural (50 m) on the quays of Auxerre (national competition); Politics vs Love, mural intervention on the Berlin Wall, Germany
- 2025: Caricartoons, commissioned by Reporters Without Borders, Paris; Prière de déchirer, commission supported by the CNC, Paris; Déchirures, commissioned by the OFAJ, Berlin; Célébration de la vie, commissioned by Champagne Pannier, Château-Thierry

== See also ==
- Street art
