= Feodor Starčević =

Serbian diplomat

Feodor Starčević (born 30 June 1942) is a Serbian diplomat and United Nations official.

Starčević was born in Split, Croatia. Beginning in the late 1960s, Starčević worked as a diplomat for Yugoslavia, including time at the Yugoslav embassy in the United Kingdom and at the United Nations in New York. From 1992 to 1995, Starčević was United Nations Chief Representative in Tbilisi, Georgia and from 1995 and 2004 he was Director of the United Nations Information Centre for India and Bhutan in New Delhi.

In May 2009, Starčević became the Permanent Representative of Serbia to the United Nations in New York.

He graduated from the University of Belgrade's Law School, having also attended the School of Journalism of the Vjesnik daily newspaper in Zagreb. Starčević speaks English and French.
