= Embassy of the United States, Nairobi =

Diplomatic mission of the United States of America to the Republic of Kenya

Embassy of the United States of America to Kenya
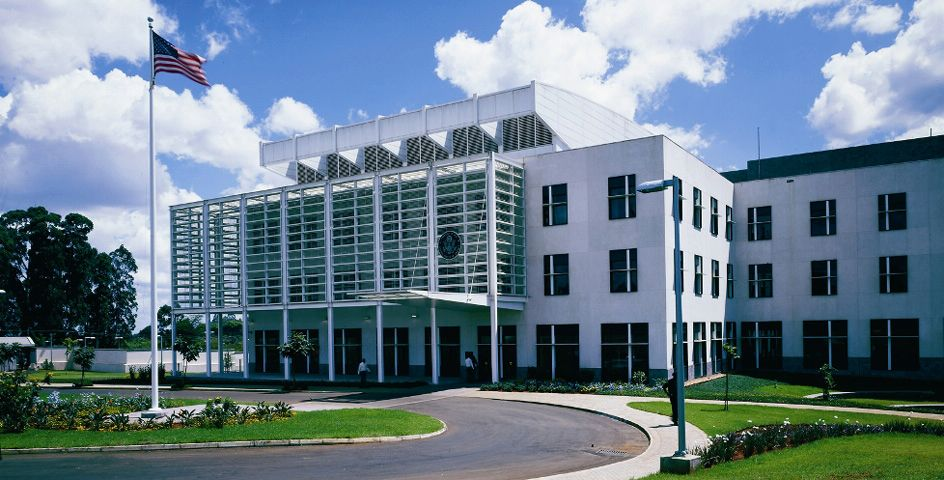
- Location: United Nations Avenue, Nairobi, Kenya
- Coordinates: 1.233985°S 36.810552°E
- Chargé d'affaires: Susan M. Burns
- Website: U.S. Embassy in Kenya

The Embassy of the United States of America in Nairobi (also known as Embassy Nairobi by the State Department), located in Nairobi, is home to the diplomatic mission of the United States to the Republic of Kenya. The embassy opened in central Nairobi on March 2, 1964, when the United States established diplomatic relations with Kenya. In 1998, the original embassy was the target of a terrorist attack, after which a new embassy building was constructed in Gigiri, a suburb of Nairobi, in 2003.

== History ==
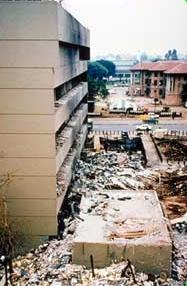
Aftermath of the 1998 bombing.

=== Original embassy ===
The United States recognized Kenya upon its independence on December 12, 1963. The US formally established diplomatic relations with Kenya on March 2, 1964. The US embassy in Nairobi was established the same day. The original embassy (1.289017°S 36.826880°E) was located on the western corner of Moi Avenue and Haile Selassie Avenue in central Nairobi.

==== 1998 bombing ====
On the morning of August 7, 1998, a truck loaded with explosives detonated in a parking lot between the embassy and two commercial, high-rise buildings (both of which contained some offices for US diplomatic staff). The attack killed 213 people and injured approximately 4000. Only 12 of the dead were Americans; most were Kenyans killed when the Ufundi House—a seven-storey office building adjacent to the embassy—collapsed. A simultaneous attack occurred at the US Embassy in Dar es Salaam, Tanzania. The attacks were attributed to al-Qaeda.

In 1999, the federal government convened a group of experts to examine the security of US diplomatic posts worldwide. The group later released a report, stating that the security of US diplomatic posts (collectively, the US's "overseas presence") were "unacceptable" and that the US overseas presence was "perilously close to the point of system failure." The 1998 embassy bombings and the September 11 terrorist attacks three years later prompted the US State Department to start a multibillion-dollar building and renovation program to make US embassies around the world safer.

The original embassy grounds were donated to a charitable trust, which turned the property into the August 7th Memorial Park and maintains the grounds. The August 7th Memorial Park contains a garden, a sculpture made of debris from the attack, a wall engraved with the names of victims, and a visitor center (built on the site of the Ufundi House).

=== Current embassy ===
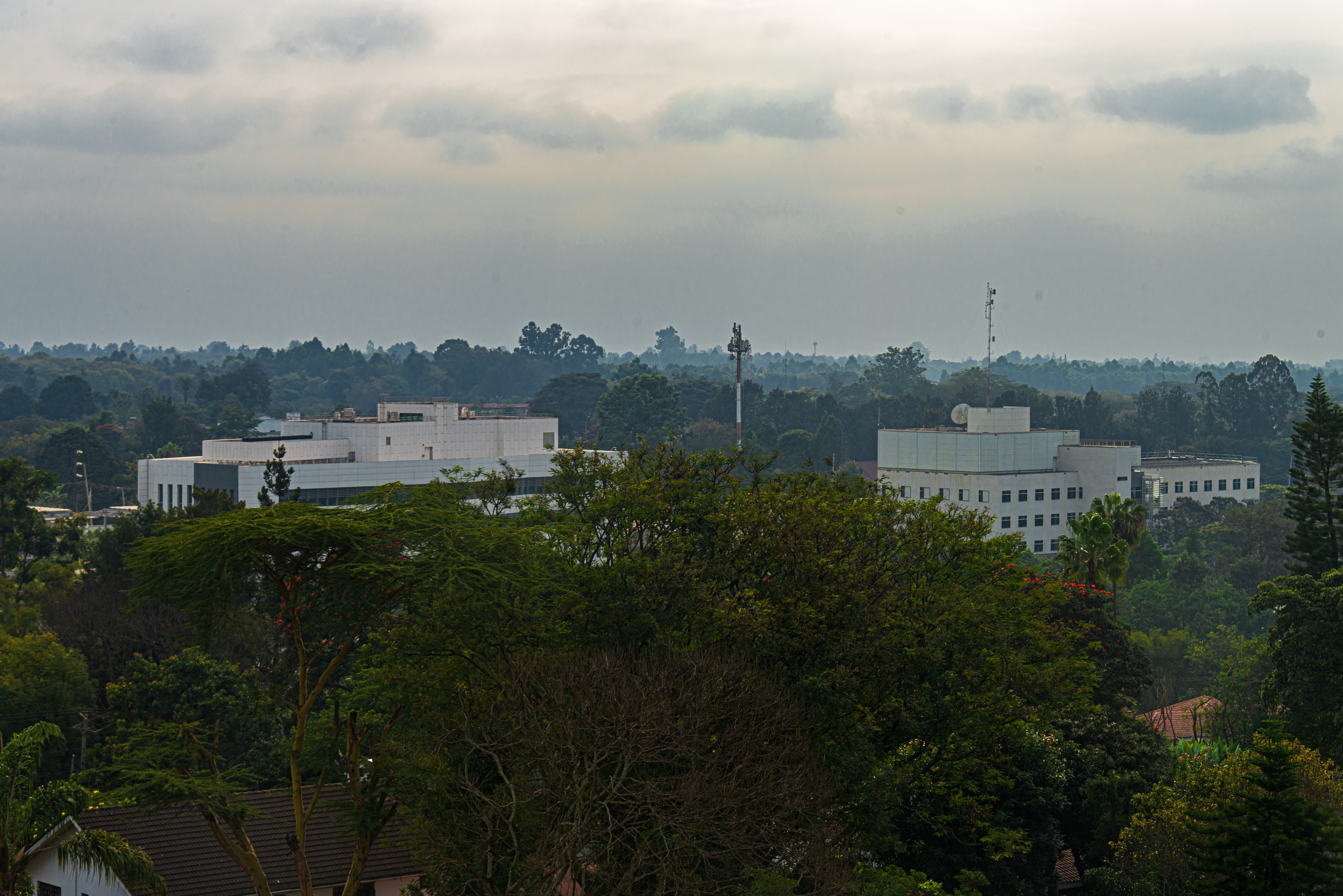
Current embassy complex seen from nearby hotel

In 2003, the US opened a new embassy in the suburb of Gigiri, across from the Office of the United Nations in Nairobi. The new embassy building was inaugurated on March 3, 2003 and has 402,100 square feet (37,350 m^{2}) of floor space. Several threats shortly after its opening caused some closures in mid-2003 and in 2014, some staff from the embassy were relocated due to a possible security threat.

== Mission ==
The embassy is home to the United States' official diplomatic mission to Kenya—consisting of the diplomats and personnel representing American interests in the host country, led by the United States Ambassador to Kenya. (Note: "Embassy" can refer to the diplomatic mission or, in common usage, the building the mission is housed (especially the chancery), while "diplomatic mission" is sometimes used interchangeably with "embassy.") The US diplomatic mission to Kenya is working with the Kenyan government to prevent the spread of HIV/AIDS, promote and strengthen Kenyan institutes of democracy, and promote business between the U.S. and Kenya; besides diplomatic activities. The embassy also provides consular services, such as issuing visas, passports (for U.S. citizens), and providing assistance to U.S. citizens in distress.

From 2015 to 2018, it was also the base for the US diplomatic mission to Somalia, due to the security situation in Somalia.
