= United Nations Information Center Washington =

Information center based in Washington, D.C.

- Abbreviation: UNIC Washington
- Formation: October 1946; 79 years ago
- Type: United Nations Information Center
- Legal status: Active
- Headquarters: Washington, D.C., United States
- Head: Director; William Davis
- Parent organization: United Nations Department of Global Communications
- Website: www.unicwash.org

The United Nations Information Center Washington (UNIC Washington) is one of the United Nations Information Centers (UNICs) located in Washington, D.C. that provides service to the United States. UNIC Washington serves as the main point of contact for engagement between the United Nations and the United States Government, as well as American civil society, media, academia and youth.

== Services ==
UNIC Washington works to link the work of the United Nations with people of the United States. It does this by providing reliable up-to-date information about the work of the organization and its subsidiary bodies to journalists, government officials, civil society representatives, students, educators and researchers. It also provides the following services:

=== Outreach ===
In order to fulfill its mandate, UNIC Washington maintains contact with media outlets across the United States in order to disseminate information about United Nations affairs via press materials and newsletters. It also works to feature articles and opinion editorials about the United nations in national media. Finally, it arranges interviews and organizes press conferences and briefings about the work of the United Nations.

=== International observances ===
UNIC Washington also works to bring awareness of international observances to the American public. It does this by participating in observances of many international days, years and decades of the United Nations. It participates in these events by hosting presentations involving national or local dignitaries, workshops, seminars, educational programs, sporting events, and musical performances. These events help stimulate interest in United Nations activities and programs by the American public, as well as promote awareness of and action upon, important political, social, cultural, humanitarian or human rights issues championed by the organization.

=== Visiting officials ===
In its efforts to strengthen United Nations-United States relations, UNIC Washington provides assistance to United Nations officials who are visiting Washington on official business. It does this by arranging meetings between high-ranking officials, ensure visiting United Nations officials are put together with the policy leaders in Washington that follow their issues closely, briefing United Nations officials on current issues under discussion in Washington, monitoring media coverage and putting United Nations officials in touch with members of the media covering specific issues of interest.

== Campaigns and projects ==
UNIC Washington helps increase public awareness for the goals of the United Nations by bringing its campaigns to the attention of the American public. The following are some of its current and past campaigns:

=== StandUp4HumanRights ===
The "StandUp4HumanRights" campaign is run by the Office of the United Nations High Commissioner for Human Rights that aims to uphold the values of peace and inclusion espoused in the Universal Declaration of Human Rights. It advocates for individual action to uphold basic human rights, as well as for practical solutions to fear and injustice. Finally, it puts pressure on the world's governments to protect the rights of all their citizens equally and in line with international law.

=== TOGETHER ===
The "TOGETHER" campaign is run by the United Nations and aims to change negative perceptions and attitudes towards refugees and migrants. It also aims to strengthen the social contract between host countries and communities, and refugees and migrants. It was launched in September 2016 and was welcomed unanimously by all 193 United Nations Member States, who committed to implementing the campaign in the New York Declaration for Refugees and Migrants.

=== Impossible Choices ===
Started in 2006 just prior to the World Humanitarian Summit in Istanbul, Turkey, the "Impossible Choices" campaign is run by the United Nations and aims to rally people and governments to take action against human loss and suffering. The campaign includes an interactive story that puts users in the shoes of refugees and requires them to make decisions that a refugee might have to in real life. It also calls for the implementation of Secretary-General Ban Ki-moon's "Agenda for Humanity," which included five core areas for action:

1. To end and prevent conflict.
2. To respect rules of war.
3. To leave no one behind.
4. To work differently to end need.
5. To invest in humanity.

=== Year of Living Sustainably ===
The "Year of Living Sustainably" campaign is run by the United Nations to provide a forum for the sharing of information and tips on leading a sustainable lifestyle. It also advocates for the successful implementation of the Sustainable Development Goals. Past activities of the campaign include:

- A cleanup of the East River near United Nations Headquarters.
- The "Be the Change" week held at Headquarters, in which staff were encouraged to live more sustainably by changing their consumption patterns.
- As part of the "Be the Change" week, getting a group of restaurants near Headquarters to allow customers to bring, and use, their own containers for food and drinks.

=== Free & Equal ===
The "Free & Equal" campaign is run by the Office of the United Nations High Commissioner for Human Rights that aims to increase public education on LGBTQ+ equality globally. It hopes to raise awareness of homophobic and transphobic violence and discrimination, and promote greater respect for the rights of LGBTQ+ people everywhere.

== Information Centers ==
UNIC Washington is part of an international system of information centers set up by the United Nations that currently operates in over 130 countries via 63 different centers. These centers are run by the Department of Global Communications, and work to disseminate information about the United Nations to the global public. They aim to do this via the translation of materials into local languages, the engagement of local opinion-makers and by placing op-ed articles by senior United Nations officials in the local media. The centers serve as one of the main vehicles through which the United Nations hopes to tells its story to the world.
