= Maria Dotsenko =

UNIC Director in the I.R. of Iran

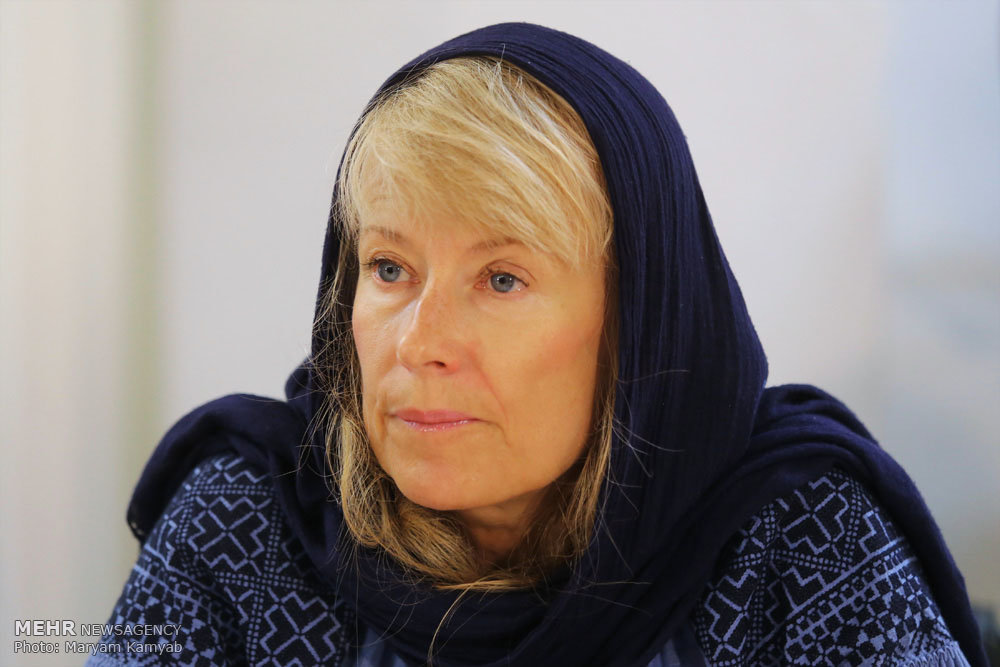
Dotsenko in 2016 in Iran

Maria Dotsenko (Ukrainian: Марія Доценко) is the UNIC director in the I.R. of Iran and former representative for the United Nations' public information office in Yerevan, Armenia.

Previously, Dotsenko was press secretary in the Serbian office of the Organization for Security and Cooperation in Europe (OSCE). She has also been a public information officer with the OSCE Spillover Monitor Mission to Skopje, Macedonia, project manager with the United States Agency for International Development (USAID), and a technical analyst for the Citizens Network for Foreign Affairs.

Dotsenko has a PhD in mathematics from the Ukrainian Academy of Science. She has also earned master's degrees in mathematics and journalism from Kyiv State University and an MBA from the International Management Institute.
