= United Nations Information Centres =

- Abbreviation: UNICs
- Formation: 1946
- Headquarters: New York
- Head: António Guterres (2017–present)
- Website: www.un.org

United Nations Information Centres (UNICs) are the filed offices Department of Global Communications of the UN Secretariat. They are the principle sources of information about the United Nations system in the countries where they are located. UNICs are responsible for promoting greater public understanding of and support for the aims and activities of the United Nations. There are 60 field offices covering 139 countries around the world.

== History ==
In 1946, the United Nations Information Centres were established by the Department of Global Communications. The first two United Nations Information Centers were created in 1946.

== Scope ==
United Nations Information Centres have been established in the regions of Europe, Americas, UAE, Asia & Pacific, and Africa. These centres are organized to reduce the communication gaps by providing information of United Nations to the people of the world. To make it more communicable all information have been translated and presented respectively in their regional languages. These centres are otherwise called United Nations Regional Information Centres and responsible for connecting United Nations with the people of developing countries. They reach out media, institutions with coordinating the UN system and get allianced with Government, Non-government, and private sector organizations in their projects. UNICs also maintain physical & digital resources of information like libraries and electronic information medium.

== Activities ==
UNICs are engaged in multiple cores of activities for sharing the latest information about UN system.

- Communication - UNICs follow communication strategies through the current affairs, traditional festivals, and events. They get information translated into regional languages of the countries they serve.
- Media Outreach - United Nations get connected with national & regional media houses to circulate information. These centres use press conference, print media, electronic and digital medium to collaborate information.
- Information Resource Development - These centres create & maintain resources like libraries, and websites through regional information centres. UNICs activities cover training sessions for journalist to keep them update with its development projects. They regularly conduct television and radio for broadcasting stories of UN in regional languages.
- Events Organization - These centres organize many events on international & national celebration days. Besides, they manage to arrange seminars, sports & other competitions in educational institutions.

== List of centres ==
The following are all of the current information centres, as well as all the areas they serve:

=== African States ===
Centre	Established	Areas serviced	Director
UNIC Accra	1958	Ghana; Sierra Leone	Sylvia Lopez-Ekra
UNIC Antananarivo	1963	Madagascar	Violet Kakyomya
UNO Asmara	1993	Eritrea	Susan Ngongi
UNIC Brazzaville	1983	Congo	Anthony Ohemeng-Boamah
UNIC Bujumbura	1961	Burundi	Garry Conille
UNIC Dakar	1964	Senegal; Cape Verde; Ivory Coast; Gambia; Guinea; Guinea-Bissau; Mauritania	Damian Cardona Onses
UNIC Dar es Salaam	1961	United Republic of Tanzania	Alvaro Rodriguez
UNIC Harare	1982	Zimbabwe	Bishow Parajuli
UNIC Lagos	1967	Nigeria	Ronald Kayanja
UNIC Lome	1962	Togo; Benin	Damien Mama
UNIC Lusaka	1975	Zambia	Janet Rogan
UNIC Nairobi	1974	Kenya; Uganda; Seychelles	Nasser Ega-Musa
UNIC Ouagadougou	1982	Burkina Faso; Chad; Mali; Niger	Metsi Makhetha
UNIC Pretoria	1995	South Africa	Masimba Tafirenyika
UNIC Windhoek	1992	Namibia	Rachel Odede
UNIC Yaounde	1965	Cameroon; Central African Republic; Gabon	Allegra Maria Del Pilar Baiocchi

=== American States ===
Centre	Established	Areas serviced	Director
UNIC Asuncion	1962	Paraguay	Jorge Meza
UNIC Bogota	1954	Colombia; Ecuador; Venezuela, Bolivarian Republic of	Helene Papper
UNIC Buenos Aires	1948	Argentina; Uruguay	Tamar Hahn
UNIC La Paz	1963	Bolivia (Plurinational State of)	Mauricio Ramirez-Villegas
UNIC Lima	1960	Peru	Maria del Carmen Sacasa
UNIC Mexico City	1947	Mexico; Cuba; Dominican Republic	Giancarlo Summa
UNIC Panama City	1984	Panama	Harold Robinson
UNIC Port of Spain	1962	Countries: Antigua and Barbuda; Bahamas; Barbados; Belize; Dominica; Grenada; Guyana; Jamaica; Saint Kitts and Nevis; Saint Lucia; Saint Vincent and the Grenadines; Suriname; Trinidad and Tobago; Other areas: Aruba; Bonaire; Curaçao; Saba; Sint Eustatius; Sint Maarten	Juan Miguel Diez
UNIC Rio de Janeiro	1947	Brazil	Maurizio Giuliano
UNIC Washington	1946	United States of America	Robert Skinner

=== Arab States ===
Centre	Established	Areas serviced	Director
UNIC Algiers	1963	Algeria	Eric Overvest
UNIC Beirut	1962	Lebanon; Jordan; Kuwait; Syrian Arab Republic	Marguerite El Helou
UNIC Cairo	1949	Egypt; Saudi Arabia	Radhia Achouri
UNIC Khartoum	1963	Sudan; Somalia	Gwi-Yeop Son
UNIC Manama	1977	Bahrain; Qatar; United Arab Emirates	Samir Al-Darabi
UNIC Rabat	1962	Morocco	Fethi Debbabi (Acting Director)
UNIC Sana'a	1994	Yemen	Lise Grande
UNIC Tunis	1960	Tunisia	Diego Zorrilla

=== Asia and Pacific States ===
Centre	Established	Areas serviced	Director
UNIC Canberra	1948	Australia; Fiji; Kiribati; Nauru; New Zealand; Samoa; Tonga; Tuvalu; Vanuatu	Christopher Woodthorpe
UNIC Colombo	1961	Sri Lanka	Hanaa Singer
UNIC Dhaka	1981	Bangladesh	Mia Seppo
UNIC Islamabad	1951	Pakistan	Vlastimil Samek (Acting Director)
UNIC Jakarta	1985	Indonesia	Francyne Harrigan (Acting Director)
UNIC Kathmandu	1964	Nepal	Sara Beysolow Nyanti
UNIC Manila	1953	Philippines; Papua New Guinea; Solomon Islands	Ola Almgren
UNIC New Delhi	1947	India; Bhutan	Rajiv Chandran (National Information Officer)
UNIC Tehran	1950	Iran (Islamic Republic of)	Maria Dotsenko
UNIC Tokyo	1958	Japan	Kaoru Nemoto
UNIC Yangon	1959	Myanmar	Knut Ostby

=== Europe and the Commonwealth of Independent States ===
Centre	Established	Areas serviced	Director
UNO Almaty	1993	Kazakhstan	Abdurahim Muhidov (Officer-in-Charge)
UNIC Ankara	1975	Turkey	Irena Vojačkova-Sollorano
UNO Baku	1992	Azerbaijan	Ghulam Isaczai
UNRIC Brussels	2004	Countries: Andorra; Belgium; Cyprus; Denmark; Finland; France; Germany; Greece; Holy See; Iceland; Ireland; Italy; Luxembourg; Malta; Monaco; Netherlands; Norway; Portugal; San Marino; Spain; Sweden; United Kingdom of Great Britain and Northern Ireland; Other areas served: European Union	Deborah Seward
UNIS Geneva	1947	Switzerland	Alessandra Vellucci
UNO Kyiv	1992	Ukraine	Osnat Lubrani
UNO Minsk	1992	Belarus	Joanna Kazana
UNIC Moscow	1948	Russian Federation	Vladimir Kuznetsov
UNIC Prague	1947	Czech Republic	Michal Broza (Officer-in-Charge)
UNO Tashkent	1992	Uzbekistan	Helena Fraser
UNO Tbilisi	1992	Georgia	Vinton Louisa
UNIS Vienna	1984	Austria; Hungary; Slovakia; Slovenia	Martin Nesirky
UNIC Warsaw	1995	Poland	Mariola Ratschka (Officer-in-Charge)
UNO Yerevan	1992	Armenia	Shombi Sharp
