= Saudi Arabia–Serbia relations =

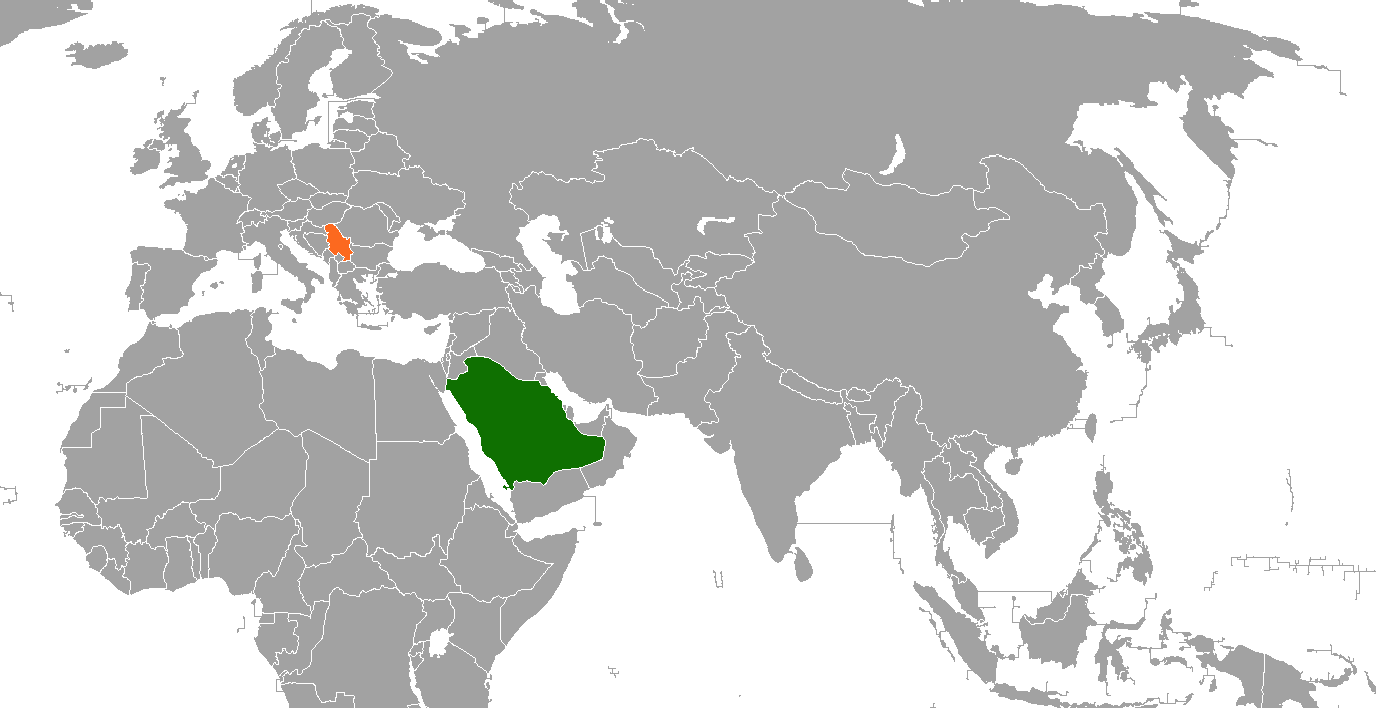
- Saudi Arabia: Serbia

Serbia and Saudi Arabia maintain diplomatic relations established in 2013.

== History ==
During the NATO bombings of Yugoslavia in 1999, which related to the Kosovo dispute, Saudi Arabia had called for restraint. Saudi Arabia had also sent lethal weapons to Kosovo Albanian force, but refused to make further involvement except to enhance cultural power in Kosovo.

Kosovo declared independence in 2008 and Saudi Arabia recognized it in 2009. Kosovo's independence was strongly opposed by Serbia, which has maintained the view that Kosovo is an integral part of Serbia.

Saudi Arabia was the last Arab country with which Serbia established diplomatic relations. In 2013, the Permanent Representative of Serbia to the United Nations, Feodor Starčević, and the Permanent Representative of Saudi Arabia to the United Nations, Abdallah Al-Mouallimi, signed a Protocol on the Establishment of Diplomatic Relations between the two countries.

== Military relations ==
Since official establishment of relations, Serbia has emerged as a major weapon supplier for Saudi Arabia. Since 2016, Serbia has been the center of controversies over arms deals with Saudi Arabia.

In 2017, a joint BIRN and OCCRP investigation revealed a large number of Serbian weapons have been purchased by Saudi Arabia via a Bulgarian tycoon to sell for the Armed Forces of Saudi Arabia and Saudi-backed groups fighting in Yemen and Syria. The accusation on Serbia over weapon selling to Saudi Arabia resurfaced in August 2019 when Serbian weapons were found to be used by Sudanese Janjaweed with Saudi Arabia as the buyer.

In 2019, Serbian military company Krušik had been involved in a scandal with regard to Saudi Arabia's arms deals; Serbian authorities were accused of silencing the detail to secure trades with Riyadh.

== Economic relations ==
Trade between two countries amounted to $96 million in 2023; Saudi merchandise exports to Serbia were about $38 million; Serbian exports were roughly the same, standing at $36 million.

== Resident diplomatic missions ==
- Serbia has an embassy in Riyadh.
- Saudi Arabia has an embassy in Belgrade.

== See also ==
- Foreign relations of Saudi Arabia
- Foreign relations of Serbia
