= United Nations Non-Governmental Liaison Service =

The United Nations Non-Governmental Liaison Service (UN-NGLS or NGLS) is a programme of the United Nations mandated to promote and develop constructive relations between the United Nations and civil society organizations. UN-NGLS operates autonomously across the United Nations system and with civil society constituencies and social movements on cross-cutting and emerging issues on the UN agenda. For example, UN-NGLS currently focuses on the UN General Assembly preparatory process for negotiations of a global compact on migration, and high-level events organized by the President of the UN General Assembly. UN-NGLS advises civil society organizations on opportunities to engage with the UN and facilitates their participation in various UN processes and events (conferences, hearings, workshops, etc.). UN-NGLS has offices at UN headquarters in New York and is part of the United Nations Department of Global Communications.

== Objectives and Structure ==
UN-NGLS facilitates civil society participation in intergovernmental policy deliberations at the UN and monitors and reports on ongoing developments in the UN and summarizes information. The Service primarily assists the Executive Office of the Secretary-General and the Office of the President of the General Assembly, as well as UN Conference Secretariats, agencies, funds, and programmes, in the design and implementation of their civil society strategies. UN-NGLS also helps address gaps and fill needs as they arise on the UN System-civil society interface.

In 2004, the Cardoso Report (the Report of the UN Secretary-General's Panel of Eminent Persons on UN-civil society relations (We the Peoples: Civil Society, the UN and Global Governance) identified NGLS as a key player to reposition the UN in addressing challenges related to the need for more participatory and coalition-based forms of global governance.

== Activities ==
Over the years UN-NGLS has pioneered many of the practices which today have become relatively mainstreamed for engagement between the UN and civil society. For example, UN-NGLS was called upon to facilitate the selection process of civil society representatives and their input in the first Interactive Hearings of the General Assembly (GA) with Civil Society, held prior to the 2005 World Summit. Since then, UN-NGLS expertise has been sought to spearhead civil society participation in the series of UNGA Hearings that focused on various issues, including international migration and development, the least developed countries, HIV/AIDS, Financing for Development, the Post-2015 Development Agenda, and more.

2006-2014
UN-NGLS has facilitated:
2006: Consultations of civil society around the Panel of Eminent Persons on UN System-wide Coherence.
2008: Participation of civil society organizations in the International Review Conference on Financing for Development.
2010: Consultations for the Secretary-General's High-level Advisory Group on Climate Change Financing (AGF).
2011-12: Consultations for the Secretary-General's Global Sustainability Panel.
2012: Consultations for the Secretary-General's High-level Group on Sustainable Energy for All.
2012-13: Consultations for the Secretary-General's High Level Panel of Eminent Persons on the Post-2015 Development Agenda, as well as a Consultation for the Secretary-General, President of the General Assembly, and the Open Working Group on Sustainable Development Goals, resulting in the seminal report Advancing Regional Recommendations on the Post-2015 Development Agenda and a series of eight policy briefs.
2014:
· For the Intergovernmental Committee of Experts on Sustainable Development Financing (ICESDF), organized civil society participation in the formal multi-stakeholder dialogues of the ICESDF, and assisted in the selection process of civil society participants in the regional/global outreach meetings.
· Supported UNDESA DSD in the design and establishment of a civil society Steering Committee for the SIDS Conference.
· At the request of UNDG, co-led the UNDG Phase II consultations for the “partnerships with civil society” component of the “Dialogues on Implementation of the Post-2015 Development Agenda,” along with UNFPA, UN Volunteers, and UN Millennium Campaign. UN-NGLS led the production of the reports for this project, and co-organized a global meeting in Cambodia that brought together civil society and government representatives from the eight countries that conducted national consultations as part of this initiative.
· By request of the Office of the President of the General Assembly (PGA), organized civil society participation in all of the PGA's High-level Thematic Debates and Events, as well as several GA mandated sessions.
· By request of the Executive Office of the Secretary-General, organized civil society participation in the Secretary-General's Climate Summit, including the selection of speakers for the opening ceremony and the panel discussion on Voices from the Frontlines of Climate Change.

2014-2017
Since 2014, UN-NGLS has become recognized for innovating more efficient and effective, open, transparent and participatory processes to enable more diverse, balanced and meaningful stakeholder participation in UN high-level events, including:

· UN General Assembly dialogues with Secretary-General Candidates
· UN Summit for Refugees and Migrants
· High-level Civil Society Event for Refugees and Migrants with Secretary-General Ban Ki-moon
· Meeting between Secretary-General Ban Ki-moon & civil society for Paris Agreement entry into force
· Paris Climate Change Agreement signing and ratification ceremonies
· High-level Events and Thematic Debates hosted by the President of the General Assembly
· UNGA High-level Meeting on Antimicrobial Resistance
· UNGA High-level Meeting on the Total Elimination of Nuclear Weapons
· UNGA High-level Meeting on Ending AIDS
· Meetings of the Interagency and Expert Group on Sustainable Development Goal Indicators
· World Humanitarian Summit
· Solutions Summit 2015 & 2016
· Post-2015 development agenda negotiations and Summit
· 2015 World Conference on Disaster Risk Reduction
· UN Secretary-General's Sustainable Energy for All Forum

2016: UN-NGLS managed accreditation and registration for stakeholders to participate in the World Humanitarian Summit, the Mid-Term Review on the Istanbul Programme of Action for Least Developed Countries, the UN Sustainable Development Summit, and the Third International Conference on Financing for Development. For the World Humanitarian Summit, it also supported the management of the execution of the Summit's 115 side events in Istanbul with UNOCHA. For the SDG Media Zone of the 71st UNGA General Debate period in September 2016, UN-NGLS introduced the participation of Google Made With Code and Code.org, where they conducted activities to raise awareness of the importance of engaging youth – particularly girls – in computer science education.
UN-NGLS co-led the process for stakeholder engagement in the UN General Assembly preparatory process for negotiations of a global compact on migration and the facilitation of stakeholder participation in the President of the General Assembly's High-level Sustainable Development Goal Action Events.

UN Secretary-General Staff Awards 2015 and 2016:
The UN-NGLS New York Office received a UN Secretary-General Staff Award in 2015 in the category of Teamwork as part of the Climate Summit Communications Team. In 2016, the UN-NGLS New York Team members were recognized as finalists for UN Secretary-General Staff Awards in the category of Managing Change together with staff members of the Office of the President of the General Assembly for their work together on the UN General Assembly dialogues for UN Secretary-General candidates.

2017–Present
In 2017, UN-NGLS joined the Civil Society Unit in the United Nations Department of Global Communications and has continued to support civil society engagement in UN processes.

2019:
NGLS involved more than 12,000 civil society representatives in conferences, events and meetings organized by the UN, at New York Headquarters and abroad. During the High-level week of the 74th UN General Assembly, UN-NGLS partnered with EOSG, OPGA, WHO, UNICEF, DESA and others to ensure the participation of CSOs in three Summits and two High-level Meetings, including the Climate Action Summit; High-level Review of the Samoa Pathway; Youth Climate Summit, and High-level Meeting on Universal Healthcare among others.

2019-20:
UNGA 74th Session: UN-NGLS facilitated 10 events convened by the President of the General Assembly. It supported the accreditation of 1195 entities, developed outreach collaterals and supported the participation of more than 6,000 representatives from across civil society onsite as well as through virtual platforms.

COVID-19 initiatives: UN-NGLS adapted swiftly to the changes in our world to engage CSOs in the fight against the coronavirus and misinformation around the pandemic. UN-NGLS surveyed NGOs over a six-month period to follow the patterns of misinformation and engaged them in the Verified initiative, to support the Department's work. UN-NGLS also called for civil society on their response stories to the pandemic, highlighting their actions through a dedicated website and social media channels.

UN Inter-agency Meetings: UN-NGLS convenes monthly meeting of Civil Society Focal Points from UN Agencies, Funds and Programmes as well as UN Departments and Offices to collaborate and amplify best practices in engagement with civil society organizations in support of the UN agenda and priorities.

== Funding ==
UN-NGLS is voluntarily funded. It receives a grant from the UN regular budget and voluntary funding from a number of UN agencies, funds, programmes and governments.

From 1988 UN-NGLS was administered by the Secretariat of the UN Conference on Trade and Development (UNCTAD) in Geneva.

Since 2017, UN-NGLS is part of the Civil Society Unit in the United Nations Department of Global Communications.

UN-NGLS is not allowed to fund NGOs.

== History of UN-NGO relations ==
Non-governmental organizations (NGOs) have been active in the United Nations (UN) since its founding. They interact with the UN Secretariat, programmes, funds and agencies and they consult with the Member States. Since its creation, the UN has committed itself to ensure that NGOs have a role to play in the work of the organization.

The UN Charter Article 71 states:

"The Economic and Social Council may make suitable arrangements for consultation with non-governmental organizations which are concerned with matters within its competence. Such arrangements may be made with international organizations and, where appropriate, with national organizations after consultation with the Member of the United Nations concerned."

Since 1945, the engagement of NGOs in the work of the UN has considerably evolved. The 1970s and 1980s witnessed a significant increase in their participation in the activities of the organization. In this period, there was a recognition of their ability to shape the global agenda as well as of their important role as operational actors. However, NGOs involved were mostly Western-based international NGOs and, with a few exceptions, their relations with the UN remained of a formal nature.

UN-NGOs relationships changed significantly in the 1990s, both quantitatively and qualitatively. The involvement of NGOs in the UN-organized world conferences, in particular, marked a turning point. Tony Hill, former head of Office in Geneva, described a "second generation" of UN-NGOs relations. This generation "is marked by the much larger scale of the NGO presence across the UN system, the more diverse institutional character of the organizations involved, now including national, regional and international NGOs, networks, coalitions and alliances, and the greater diversity of the issues that NGOs seek to address at the UN. Above all, the second generation of UN-NGOs relations are essentially political and reflect the motivation of NGOs to engage with the UN as part of the institutional architecture of global governance." One institutional response of the UN to these changes was to review the consultative status with the ECOSOC. Resolution 1296 of 1968 was replaced by resolution 1996/31 adopted in 1996, which allows, among other things, subregional, regional, and national NGOs to be accredited. Before, only international NGOs could apply for consultative status.

Since then, the necessity to strengthen relations between the UN and civil society has been emphasized in various documents, in particular in the United Nations Millennium Declaration of September 2000. The commitment of Member States to give greater opportunities to NGOs has been reaffirmed in the 2005 World Summit Outcome Document (para 172–174).

This was again reaffirmed during the 2012 Rio+20 outcome document called "The Future we Want".

== Other UN engagements with NGOs ==
Several UN agencies have dedicated NGO Focal Points and UN-NGO relations are conducted on a broad range of issues.

According to the UN, NGOs and other civil society organizations (CSOs) are system partners and valuable UN links to civil society. CSOs play a key role at major United Nations Conferences and are indispensable partners for UN efforts at the country level. NGOs are consulted on UN policy and programme matters. The UN organizes and hosts, on a regular basis, briefings, meetings and conferences for NGO representatives who are accredited to UN offices, programmes and agencies.

The Civil Society Unity of the Department of Global Communications oversees partnerships with associated NGOs and provides a wide range of information services to them.

The UN Democracy Fund (UNDEF), which is supported by 36 Member States, is funding projects that strengthen the voice of civil society in democratic processes around the world. The large majority of UNDEF funds go to local civil society organizations—both in the transition and consolidation phases of democratization.

The Department of Economic and Social Affairs (DESA) NGO Branch is the Secretariat for the process for non-governmental organizations to apply for consultative status with ECOSOC.

=== See also ===
UNCTAD
