= United Nations Information Centre for India and Bhutan =

Outreach and communication centre

- Abbreviation: UNIC for India and Bhutan
- Type: Information centre
- Legal status: Active
- Headquarters: New York
- Head: Director; Darrin Farrant; India; Bhutan (2023 - present)
- Website: india.un.org/en

The United Nations Information Centre for India and Bhutan is based in New Delhi, India. It is one of 59 active United Nations Information Centres (UNICs) located worldwide.

These UNICs work globally under the direction of the Department of Global Communications (DGC) of the United Nations Secretariat. Their objective is to engage audiences in the work of the United Nations (UN) and promote its goals.

The United Nations Information Centre for India and Bhutan, also known as UNIC New Delhi, was created in 1947. While it is headquartered in New Delhi, it provides information services to the public in both India and Bhutan.

== Scope ==
UNIC New Delhi’s work covers an array of media, outreach and strategic communications activities. This includes creating and publishing original multimedia content, conducting media outreach, engaging with the government, universities, schools, civil society and the private sector, organizing and participating in public events, maintaining digital information resources and translating UN information materials into local languages.

== Activities ==
The core objective of UNIC New Delhi is to bring the UN closer to the people. It does this through many activities, including:

- Creating original multimedia content about the work of the UN and publishing it on various platforms, including websites, videos, newsletters and social media
- Translating UN information materials into local languages
- Sharing UN information materials with key partners, including government, civil society, universities, schools, researchers and media houses
- Engaging in public speaking opportunities and media interviews
- Partnering government ministries, public institutions, embassies, universities, schools and civil society groups to celebrate international days with special events and activities
- Organizing workshops, seminars, webinars, training sessions and conferences on UN objectives, in partnership with government and/or civil society groups
- Staging social and cultural activities such as art competitions, musical performances, quizzes and other public events
- Maintaining digital resources that are accessible to the public
- Coordinating UN communications in India
- Helping India-based UN agencies develop and execute their communications strategies.

== UNIC Director ==
Darrin Farrant has served as Director of the UN Information Centre for India and Bhutan since May 2023. Mr. Farrant, a national of Australia, has worked in communications or journalism for more than three decades, including over 20 years with the United Nations in New York, Khartoum and El Fasher, Sudan.

== Location ==
The United Nations Information Centre for India and Bhutan is located at 55, Joseph Stein Lane, Lodhi Estate, New Delhi 110003, India.
