= Sacco Societies Regulatory Authority =

- SASRA

Agency overview
- Formed: June 18, 2010
- Jurisdiction: Kenya
- Agency executives: Robert Mungai, Chairman of the Board of Directors; Peter Njuguna, Chief Executive Officer
- Parent department: Office of the Commissioner of Co-operative Development
- Parent agency: Ministry of Agriculture, Livestock, Fisheries and Co-operatives
- Website: www.sasra.go.ke

The SACCO Societies Regulatory Authority (SASRA) is the primary regulatory body charged with licensing Deposit‑Taking Sacco Societies (Savings and Credit Co-operatives Societies) - DT regulation 2010 and authorizing specified Non Deposit taking saccos - NDTS Regulations 2021 in the Republic of Kenya.

== History ==
The Authority was established as a body corporate in 2010, pursuant to the provisions of the Sacco Societies Act with the primary purpose of streamlining the regulation of SACCOs and Co-operatives in the country under the supervision of the Commissioner of Co-operative Development, an office under the Ministry of Agriculture, Livestock, Fisheries and Co-operatives.

Its mandate is to regulate, supervise and license SACCOs and Co-operatives in the country while receiving levy contributions from the same in accordance with the Sacco Societies Act of 2008.
