= Ali Asghar Soltanieh =

Iranian academic and diplomat (born 1950)

علی اصغر سلطانیه Ali Asghar Soltanieh
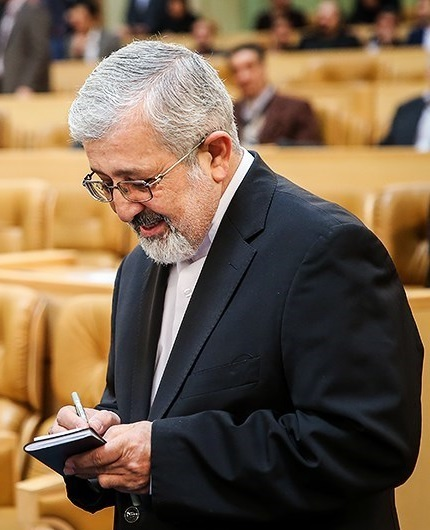

Representative of Iran to the IAEA
- In office 1 September 2006 – 1 September 2013
- President: Mahmoud Ahmadinejad
- Preceded by: Mohammad Mehdi Akhondzadeh
- Succeeded by: Reza Najafi
- In office 1 September 1982 – 1 September 1987
- President: Ali Khamenei
- Preceded by: Inaugural holder
- Succeeded by: Khalil Mousavi

Personal details
- Born: 1 October 1950 (age 76) Tehran, Iran
- Education: Utah State University

Ali Asghar Soltanieh English pronunciation (Persian: علی‌اصغر سلطانیه, born 1 October 1950) was Iran's ambassador to the International Atomic Energy Agency in Vienna. He served the position from 1982 to 1987 and for a second term in 2006 until 2013.

== Early life and education ==
Soltanieh was born in Tehran on 1 October 1950. He studied at Utah State University in the United States. Currently living in Vienna Austria.

== Career ==
Soltanieh is a nuclear physicist by training and worked as associate professor at faculties of science and international relations in various universities between 1988 and 1997. He taught courses in nuclear physics.

In the 1990s he was involved, as a nuclear physicist and senior diplomat, in the capacity of special envoy, delegate, chief negotiator, and invited speaker in numerous international events on disarmament and international security, such as NPT, CWC, BWC, CTBT, CCW, and has worked closely with the relevant international scientific and technical organizations such as UN, IAEA, OPCW, and other specialized international organizations such as WHO, ILO, Inter-Parliamentary Union (IPU), QIC, WMO, TWAS and ICDO. He has published several papers in aforementioned areas.

For the three years immediately prior to taking up his position as the Iran's envoy to the International Atomic Energy Agency in Vienna, Soltanieh was the head of Iran's National Escort Team for IAEA Inspections; a member of delegation to the IAEA board of governors and general conference; and a member of the negotiating team, Iran-EU3/EU negotiation on nuclear energy.

On 27 August 2013, it was reported that Reza Najafi replaced Soltanieh as the Iran's ambassador to the International Atomic Energy Agency in Vienna.

== Personal life ==
Soltanieh is married and has three children.

Diplomatic posts
Preceded by Mohammad Mehdi Akhondzadeh Basti	Ambassador of Iran to IAEA; 2006–2013	Succeeded by Reza Najafi
