= United Nations Office at Vienna =

One of four major United Nations offices

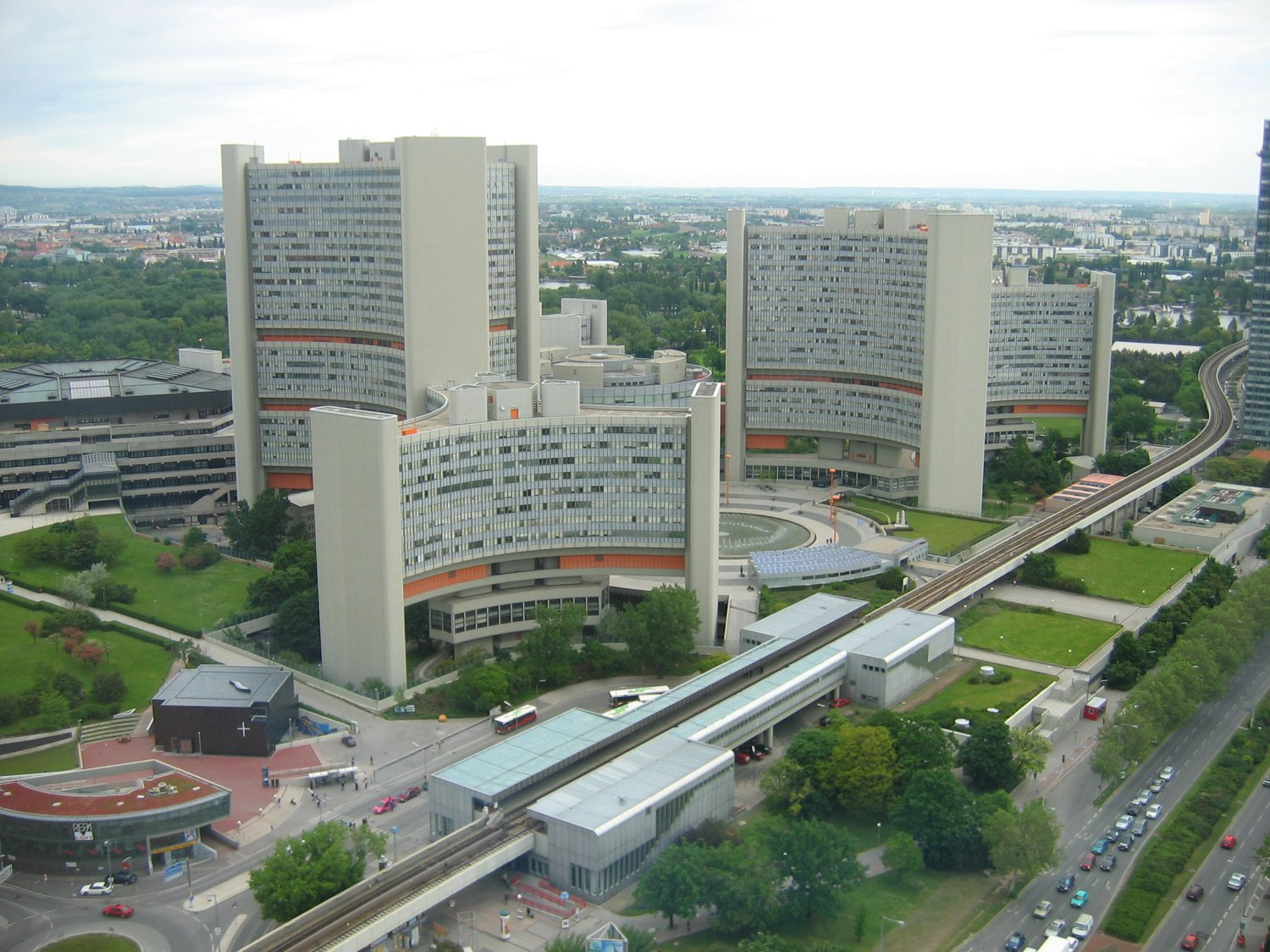
- Aerial view of Vienna International Centre, which houses the UNOV

- Location within Austria
- Alternative names: UNOV

General information
- Location: Vienna, Austria
- Coordinates: 48.234722°N 16.416944°E

Website
- unov.org

The United Nations Office at Vienna (UNOV, German: Büro der Vereinten Nationen in Wien) is one of the four major office sites of the United Nations (Note: The others being in New York City, Geneva and Nairobi) where numerous different UN agencies have a joint presence. UNOV was established on 1 January 1980, and was the third such complex to be created.

The office complex is located in Vienna, the capital of Austria, and is part of the Vienna International Centre, a cluster of several major international organizations also informally called "UNO city" and "Mordor".

== Constituent agencies ==
Headquartered at the Vienna International Centre:

- International Atomic Energy Agency (has a special agreement on its status)
- International Money Laundering Information Network
- International Narcotics Control Board
- Preparatory Commission for the Comprehensive Nuclear-Test-Ban Treaty
- United Nations Commission on Crime Prevention and Criminal Justice
- United Nations Commission on International Trade Law
- United Nations Industrial Development Organization
- United Nations Office for Outer Space Affairs
- United Nations Office on Drugs and Crime
- United Nations Scientific Committee on the Effects of Atomic Radiation

Presence at the Vienna International Centre:

- International Commission for the Protection of the Danube River
- United Nations High Commissioner for Refugees
- United Nations Information Service
- United Nations Office for Project Services
- Investigations Division of the United Nations Office of Internal Oversight Services
- United Nations Postal Administration
- United Nations Office for Disarmament Affairs

== Visits ==
Daily guided tours of the office are provided.

== Services ==
=== United Nations Library - Vienna ===
The United Nations Library in Vienna provides library and information services to staff of United Nations units based in Vienna, as well as to any Permanent Missions in Vienna and select clients.

As part of the global network of United Nations Libraries, the library works with the various United Nations libraries across the globe. The library at Vienna also works closely with the International Trade Law (UNCITRAL) Library and the United Nations Information Service (UNIS) Library.

The Library's collection includes:

- Material related to the work of the United Nations units based in Vienna
- Official United Nations documents in all official languages
- The United Nations Treaty Series
- Selected United Nations sales publications
- Documents of other United Nations organizations and specialized agencies

The Library has also developed a series of research guides on subjects related to the work of the United Nations entities based in Vienna. These guides provide more information on the work done in Vienna, and highlight resources for further research in those subject areas. Some of the guides include:

- Corruption
- Crime Prevention and Criminal Justice
- Terrorism Prevention

== Country representatives ==
- United States Ambassador to the United Nations International Organizations in Vienna
- Andorra
- List of ambassadors of Iran to United Nations Office at Vienna

== Cultural works ==
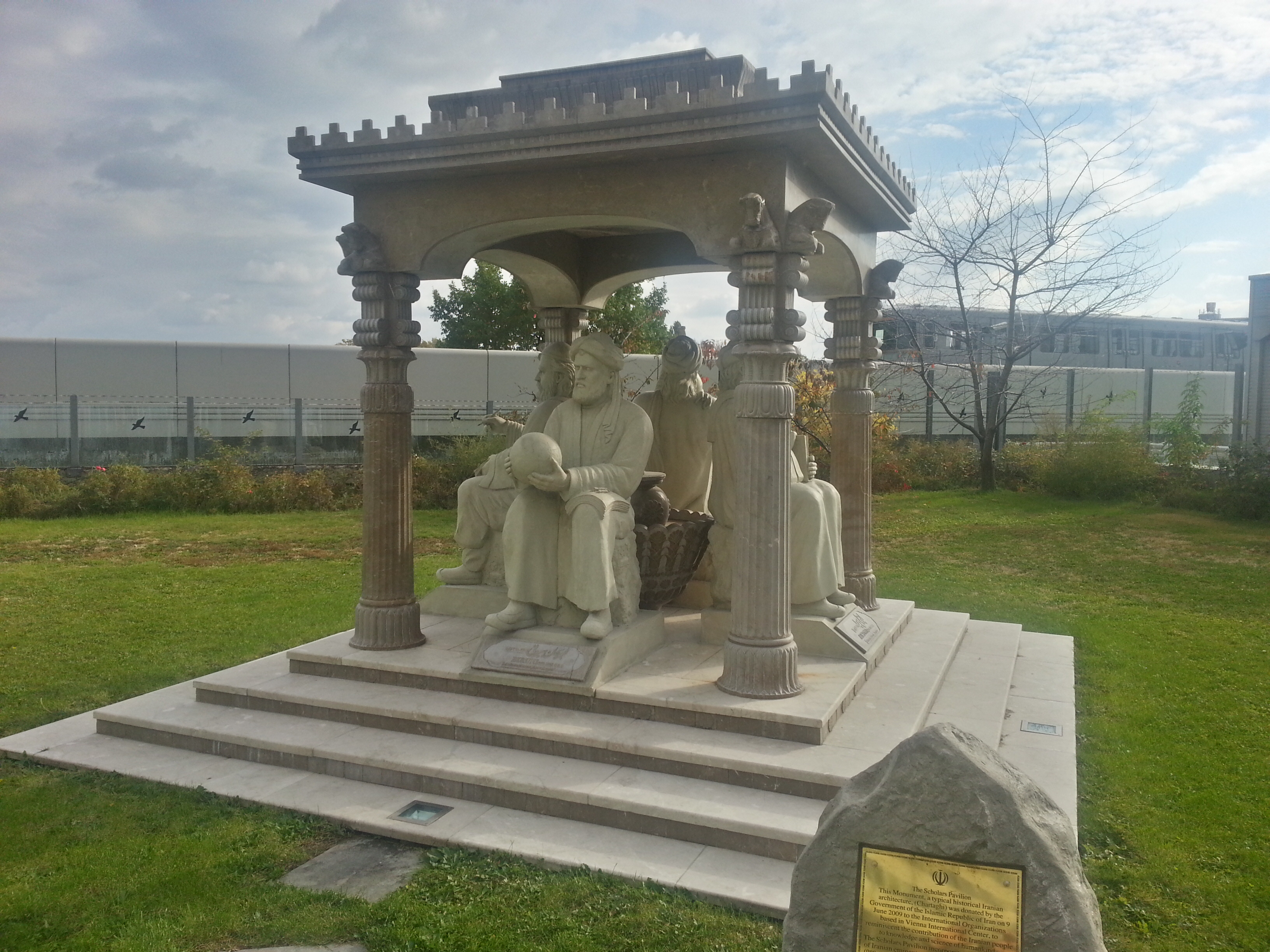
"Persian Scholars Pavilion" at UNOV, donated by Iran

The courtyards and corridors of the United Nations Office at Vienna are adorned with many works of art.

Persian Scholar Pavilion

In June 2009 Iran donated a pavilion to the United Nations Office in Vienna, which is located in the central Memorial Plaza of the Vienna International Centre. The Persian Scholars Pavilion at UNOV features statues of four prominent Persian figures. Highlighting Persian architectural features, the pavilion is adorned with Persian art forms and includes the statues of renowned Persian scientists Avicenna, Abu Rayhan Biruni, Zakariya Razi (Rhazes) and Omar Khayyam.

== Popular culture ==
The Vienna International Centre has also entered Viennese popular culture through its colloquial name, "UNO City", which is widely used in everyday speech and tourism promotion. The complex has also been referenced in popular culture by cannabis activists and locals as "Mordor".

In 2024, a large peace-themed mural by Australian street artist Fintan Magee was completed on one of the VIC buildings as part of a collaboration with Vienna's "Calle Libre" festival and UN organizations.

== See also ==
- United Nations headquarters (New York City)
- United Nations Office at Geneva
- United Nations Office at Nairobi
