= United Nations Regional Information Centre for Western Europe =

United Nations communications organization

Coordinates: 50.8428°N 4.3804°E

- Abbreviation: UNRIC
- Formation: January 2004; 22 years ago
- Type: United Nations Information Centre
- Legal status: Active
- Headquarters: Brussels, Belgium
- Head: Director; Sherri Aldis (since 2022)
- Parent organization: United Nations Department of Global Communications; United Nations Secretariat
- Website: unric.org/en/

The United Nations Regional Information Centre for Western Europe (UNRIC) based in Brussels serves as the United Nations (UN)'s communications office, across 22 Western European countries as well as operating under 13 regional languages which makes the UN information accessible to the diverse audiences throughout the region.

== Main Objective ==
As the regional arm of the UN Department of Global Communications, UNRIC's main objective is to notify the public and to keep them connected with all of UN's current and past activities, as well as building strong connections between the United Nations and key European stakeholders; these stakeholders include EU institutions, governments, civil society, media, academia, and the private sector. To execute their objective, the UNRIC makes a page of informational materials, which include their fact sheets, press kits, brochures, reports, and other communication resources which keeps the public informed daily about what is happening with the UN. They also work closely with governments, media outlets, civil society organizations, academic institutions, and schools to support the community with interactive events that help promote understanding of the United Nations' work.

== Resources ==
UNRIC’s official website is available in 13 languages—including Danish, Dutch, English, Finnish, French, German, Greek, Icelandic, Italian, Norwegian, Portuguese, Spanish, and Swedish.This makes the UN's content available to the tons of people living across Western Europe. UNRIC Centre also operates a public reference library that provides access to a ton of the UN's documents and publications over the years and currently to keep Western Europeans up to date. They also regularly organize events such as press briefings, film screenings, panel discussions, and Model United Nations conferences, both in Brussels and throughout Western Europe, to encourage informed dialogue and engagement with the UN’s work.

== Countries served ==
On 1 January 2004, the United Nations Regional Information Centre opened in Brussels, replacing the previous United Nations Information Centres in Athens, Bonn, Brussels, Copenhagen, Lisbon, London, Madrid, Paris and Rome, which ceased operations on 31 December 2003. It has since provided services to the following Western European countries:

- Andorra
- Belgium
- Cyprus
- Denmark
- Finland
- France
- Germany
- Greece
- Holy See
- Iceland
- Ireland
- Italy
- Luxembourg
- Malta
- Monaco
- Netherlands
- Norway
- Portugal
- San Marino
- Spain
- Sweden
- United Kingdom of Great Britain and Northern Ireland
