= United Nations Office at Nairobi =

One of four major United Nations offices

- Location within Kenya
- Abbreviation: UNON
- Location: Nairobi, Kenya
- Coordinates: 1.2346°S 36.8164°E
- Director-General: Zainab Bangura
- Website: www.unon.org

The United Nations Office at Nairobi (UNON, Swahili: Ofisi ya Umoja wa Mataifa Nairobi) in Nairobi, the capital of Kenya, is one of four major United Nations office sites (Note: The others being in New York City, Geneva, and Vienna) where numerous different UN agencies have a joint presence. Established in 1996, it is the UN's official headquarters in Africa.

The United Nations Office at Nairobi also hosts the global headquarters for two programmes: the United Nations Environmental Programme (UNEP) and the United Nations Human Settlements Programme (UN-Habitat).

In November 2004, the United Nations Security Council held a rare session at Nairobi to discuss the armed conflicts in southern and western Sudan that constituted a phase of the Second Sudanese Civil War. The meeting was convened at the urging of then-Ambassador John Danforth of the United States.

== Location ==
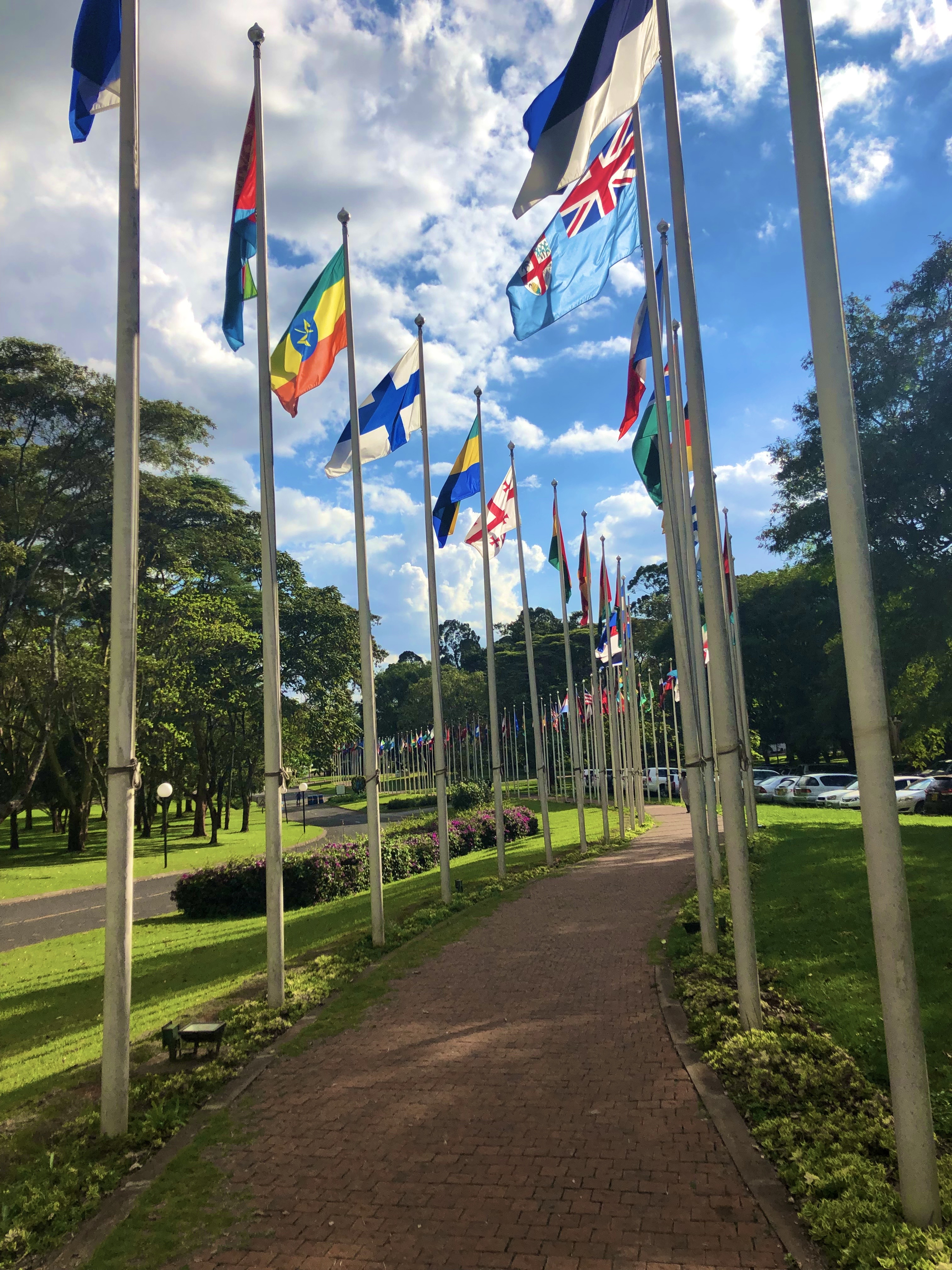
Flags of member states at the United Nations, Nairobi

The complex of buildings is located next to the Karura Forest in the Gigiri district of Nairobi, along United Nations Avenue. It stands across the street from the US Embassy in Kenya.

The UN complex contains a 'green' building, a completely energy and carbon-neutral building, housing UNEP and UN-Habitat offices. The building is the first of its kind in Africa, recycling water and using natural light to reduce reliance on artificial lighting. In addition, the building is designed to use natural flow of air as a substitute to air conditioning, and it contains solar panels to generate all the energy that the building might consume. It was opened on 31 March 2011 by UN Secretary-General Ban Ki-moon and Kenyan President Mwai Kibaki.

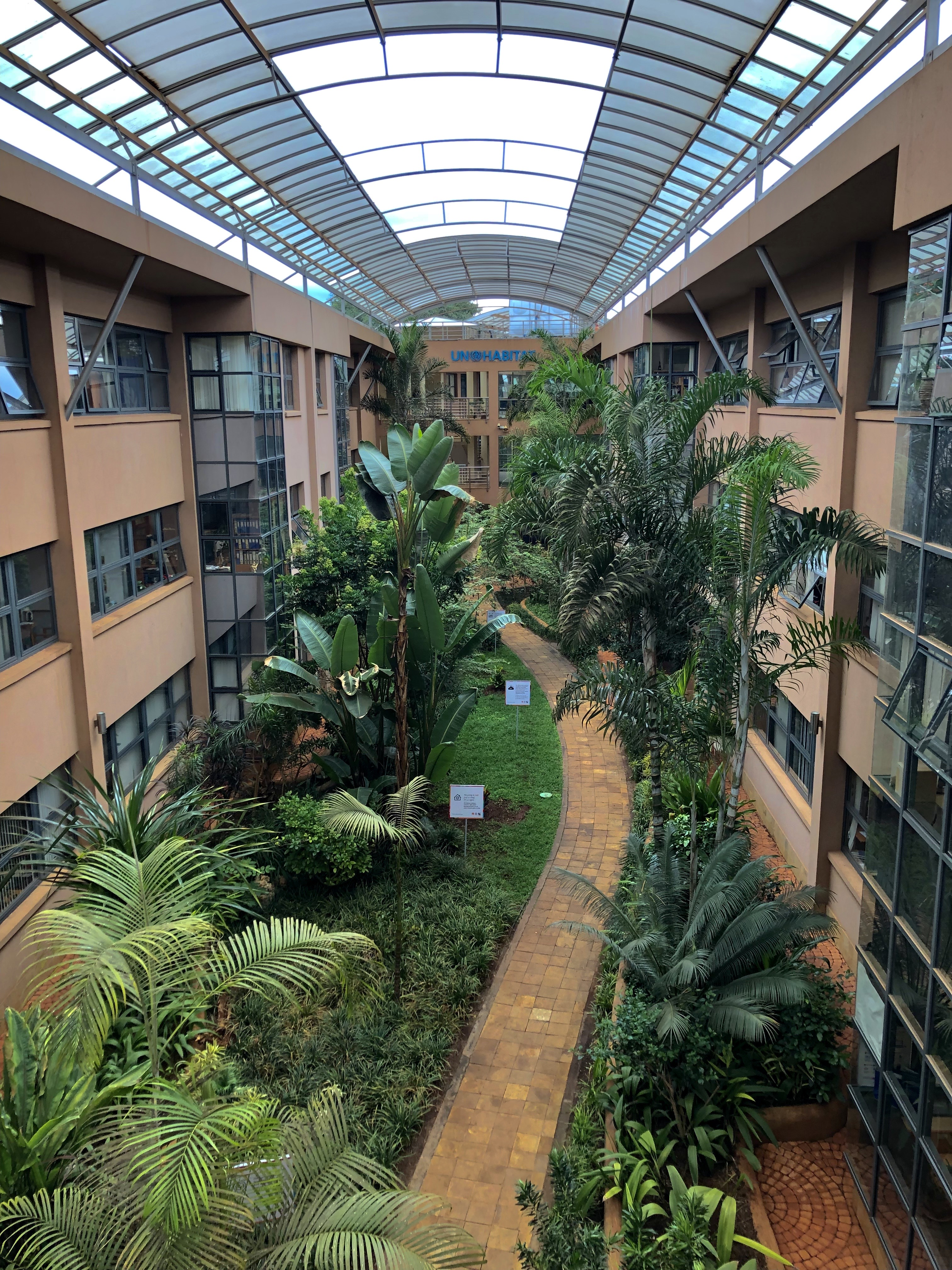
The zero-energy UN-Habitat and UNEP office building

Burned Trees, a series of sculptures designed by Monegasque artist Philippe Pastor aimed at drawing attention to forest fires, has been exhibited continuously at the office since 2006.

== Visits ==
The office complex can also be visited by the public, in the form of pre-booked, guided tours, provided by the UN Visitors' Service of Nairobi. Anyone interested has the opportunity to book a tour, during which one can learn about the history and work of the UN, while also getting an opportunity to see the offices, including the above-mentioned green building. Tours are available during office hours each day, in various languages (e.g. English, Chinese, German, French, Kiswahili).

== Constituent agencies ==
Headquartered at Nairobi:

- United Nations Environment Programme (UNEP or UN Environment)
- United Nations Human Settlements Programme (UN-Habitat)

Presence at Nairobi:

- Food and Agriculture Organization
- International Civil Aviation Organization - Eastern and Southern African (ESAF) Office - Located in the UN office
- International Labour Organization
- International Maritime Organization
- International Monetary Fund
- Joint United Nations Programme on HIV/AIDS
- United Nations Centre for Regional Development, Africa Office
- UN Women
- United Nations Development Programme
- United Nations Office on Drugs and Crime
- United Nations Educational, Scientific and Cultural Organization
- United Nations High Commission for Refugees
- United Nations Industrial Development Organization
- United Nations Children's Fund
- United Nations Common Air Services
- United Nations Office for the Coordination of Humanitarian Affairs
- United Nations Office for Project Services
- United Nations Assistance Mission in Somalia
- United Nations Population Fund
- World Bank
- World Food Programme
- World Health Organization

UNON also hosts the annual East Africa Model United Nations Conference for secondary school and university students from East Africa.

== Directors-General ==
UNON is headed by a Director-General, who is at the rank of Under-Secretary-General in the United Nations System. The Director-General is appointed by the Secretary General. The current Director-General is Zainab Bangura of Sierra Leone.

1. Klaus Töpfer, Germany, 1998–2006
2. Anna Tibaijuka, Tanzania, 2006–2009
3. Achim Steiner, Brazil, 2010–2011
4. Sahle-Work Zewde, Ethiopia, 2011–2018
5. Hanna Tetteh, Ghana, 2018–2019
6. Maimunah Mohd Sharif, Malaysia, 2019–2020 (Acting)
7. Zainab Bangura, Sierra Leone, 2020–present

== See also ==
- United Nations Headquarters, New York City
- United Nations Office at Geneva
- United Nations Office at Vienna
- List of United Nations organizations by location
