= United Nations Department of Global Communications =

Department of the Secretariat of the United Nations

- Abbreviation: DGC
- Formation: 13 February 1946; 79 years ago
- Legal status: Active
- Head: Under-Secretary-General of Global Communications; Melissa Fleming since 2019
- Parent organization: United Nations Secretariat
- Website: DGC on www.un.org

The United Nations Department of Global Communications (DGC) (prior to 1 January 2019, the United Nations Department of Public Information) is a department of the Secretariat of the United Nations. It is tasked with raising public awareness and support of the work of the United Nations through strategic communications campaigns, media and relationships with civil society groups.

== Mission ==
The mission of the Department is "communicating the ideals and work of the United Nations to the world; to interacting and partnering with diverse audiences; and to building support for peace, development and human rights for all."

In 2018, Jan Kickert, Permanent Representative of Austria to the UN, was Chairman of the United Nations Committee on Information, a subsidiary body of the United Nations General Assembly established to deal with questions relating to public information. The Committee oversees the work of the United Nations Department of Global Communications.

== Divisions ==
The Department aims to accomplish this through its three Divisions:

=== The Strategic Communications Division (SCD) ===
The Strategic Communications Division formulates and launches global information campaigns on United Nations issues to help support the goals of the Organisation.

The Division also manages its network of 63 United Nations Information Centres around the world. These centres are responsible for promoting greater public understanding of, and support, for the aims and activities of the United Nations by disseminating information to the public. It achieves this by:

- Translating information materials into local languages
- Engaging opinion-makers
- Placing op-ed articles by senior United Nations officials in the national media
- Organising events to highlight issues or observances.

=== The News and Media Division (NMD) ===
The News and Media Division works with partners in global media to disseminate information on the United Nations and its work. This includes dissemination in various formats, including: television, radio and Internet.

The Departments services include:

- Allowing media accreditation and liaison for journalists to cover day-to-day operations of the United Nations
- Providing live coverage, through video, audio and still images, of all official meetings and other important events
- Providing written summaries of these events as they are concluded
- Making accessible these visual and audio records
- Producing and distributing original content for broadcast

The News and Media Division includes the UN News Centre. In 2002, when the News Centre was under the Department of Public Information, it launched an email-based United Nations News Service.

=== The Outreach Division (OD) ===
The Outreach Division works to foster global dialogue between academia, civil society, the entertainment industry, educators and students to encourage support for the goals of the United Nations.

This Division serves the broadest audience through:

- Special public events
- Publications
- Services for visitors, including guided tours through the UN Visitor Centre
- Library services through the Dag Hammarskjöld Library
- Partnerships with educational institutions and non-governmental organizations (NGOs).

== Other services ==
The United Nations Development Business (UNDB) was launched in 1978 as a news source for information about procurements.

== See also ==
- Aarhus Convention
- Declaration of Rio (principle no. 10)
- Participation (decision making)
