= Reactions to 2012 Gaza War =

The following is a list of reactions to the 2012 Gaza War:

== Domestic ==
Israel	On the first day of the operation, Prime Minister of Israel Benjamin Netanyahu said "Today we sent a clear message to Hamas and other terrorist organisations, and if it becomes necessary we are prepared to expand the operation." According to Haaretz, President Shimon Peres updated US President Barack Obama by phone and told him "Israel does not want an escalation but for the last five days we were under nonstop bombardment, mothers and children cannot sleep in peace at night. There is a limit to what Israel can withstand. Ahmed Jabari was behind many terror activities." Interior Minister Eli Yishai said: "The goal of the operation is to send Gaza back to the Middle Ages, only then will Israel be calm for the next 40 years." Ministry of Home Front Defense Avi Dichter said: "We have no other choice; Israel must perform a reformatting of Gaza, and rearrange it, as we did in Judea and Samaria during Operation Defensive Shield." Most Israeli political leaders, including Tzipi Livni, Shelly Yachimovich, Yuli Edelstein, Israel Katz, Shaul Mofaz, and Naftali Bennett applauded the operation. However, leaders of the left-wing Meretz party voiced opposition on the radio and online. The Israeli Foreign Ministry went into semi-emergency mode, canceling all vacations for its Jerusalem staffers.
Hamas	Fawzi Barhoum, a spokesman for Hamas, called the assassination of Ahmed Jabari an act of war. On 14 November 2012, a statement from the Izz ad-Din al-Qassam Brigades said "The occupation has opened the gates of hell on itself" and vowed that its militants would "continue the path of resistance". Similarly Abu Ahmed, a spokesman for the armed wing of Islamic Jihad, called the assassination a "declaration of war" pledging a response within hours.
Palestinian National Authority	Palestinian officials have asked the U.N. Security Council to act to halt Israel's military operation in Gaza. President Mahmoud Abbas cut short a tour of Europe to return to the West Bank. Mahmoud Abbas instructed the Palestinian Representative to the Arab League to ask for an urgent meeting of the Arab League.

== Supranational bodies ==
United Nations	The United Nations Security Council held an emergency meeting on the situation during the night of 14–15 November and came to no decision. President Pro Tempore of the Council Hardeep Singh Puri subsequently told reporters: "In short, the message that must resonate from this meeting is 'the violence has to stop'”. On 18 November, UN Secretary-General Ban Ki-moon released a statement saying that he was "deeply saddened" by the deaths of civilians and "alarmed by the continuing firing of rockets against Israeli towns." On 19 November, Ban Ki-moon visited Cairo to discuss with the Egyptian President the current state of conflict and the efforts made to cease fire. It will be followed by a visit on Tuesday to the Israeli Prime Minister in Jerusalem to stop the operation expansion. Ban will end his Middle East tour by heading to the West Bank, Ramallah to meet the Palestinian president.
Arab League	The Arab League called for the prosecution of "Zionist war criminals," describing their actions as "war crimes" and "crimes against humanity." On 20 November, a selected delegation from the Arab League, led by Nabil Elaraby, will be visiting Gaza in solidarity with the Palestinians and to facilitate the efforts of ceasing fire. Stronger actions are yet to be expected by the Palestinian authority from the league such as conducting an urgent summit.
European Union	EU foreign policy chief Catherine Ashton said: "The rocket attacks by Hamas and other factions in Gaza, which began this current crisis are totally unacceptable for any government and must stop. Israel has the right to protect its population from these kind of attacks. I urge Israel to ensure that its response is proportionate."
Non-Aligned Movement	A statement released by Iran, which holds the rotating presidency of the bloc of mainly Asian, American and African countries, condemned the Israeli air strikes.
NATO	NATO Secretary General Anders Fogh Rasmussen said: "Of course Israel has the right to self-defense, and attacks against Israel must end. But the international community would also expect Israel to show restraint."

== Countries ==
Afghanistan	Afghan President Hamid Karzai condemned Israel's airstrikes on Gaza and called for an "immediate stop" to violence against civilians.
Algeria	Algeria strongly condemned, through Ministry of Foreign Affairs' spokesman Amar Belani, the "Israeli aggression against Gaza strip" and urged the United Nations Security Council and the international community to assume their responsibilities and "put an end to this dangerous escalation"
Argentina	President Cristina Fernandez de Kirchner expressed "solidarity with all victims" and pledged to "work with regional leaders in urging warring parties to cease violence."
Armenia	The Foreign Minister of Armenia, Edward Nalbandyan, said regarding the war in Gaza: “The use of force and militaristic threats should be stopped. We strongly believe that there is no alternative to the peaceful resolution of the conflict through peace talks,”
Australia	The Prime Minister of Australia, Julia Gillard, stated that "The government condemns the repeated rocket and mortar attacks on Israel from the Gaza Strip and calls on Hamas to cease these immediately. Australia supports Israel's right to defend itself against these indiscriminate attacks. Such attacks on Israel's civilian population are utterly unacceptable."
Bahrain	Bahrain reiterated its strong condemnation of the "brutal Israeli aggression on the Gaza Strip." The Minister of State for Foreign Affairs Ghanim bin Fadl Al Buainain urged the international community to step up efforts to halt the "repeated and unjustified Israeli aggression on the Gaza Strip." On 20 November a Bahrain lawmaker said he set fire to an Israeli flag during a parliament session in a show of support for the Palestinians in Gaza. Al-Tamimi said he sought to "send a clear message to the international community" about Bahrain's support for the people of Gaza as they face Israeli attacks in retaliation for stepped up rocket strikes by the Palestinian group Hamas.
Belgium	Belgian Foreign Minister Didier Reynders stressed "Israel's legitimate right to defend its population against these attacks" and called for a "measured response".
Brazil	The Brazilian government talking on behalf of Mercosur condemned Israel's "disproportionate use of force" on Gaza and called on Israel and Palestinians for an immediate ceasefire. In the statement Mercosur leaders expressed their "strongest condemnation of the violence unleashed between Israel and Palestine" and "deeply regret the loss of lives and expresses its concern with the disproportionate use of force".
Bulgaria	Bulgarian Foreign Minister Nickolay Mladenov defended "the right of Israeli citizens to live peacefully" and condemned the rocket attacks by "Hamas and other militant groups". At the same time he urged Israel to take "strict measures to avoid civilian casualties among the Palestinian population" and expressed condolences to the families of victims among the civilian population on both sides.
Canada	Canadian Minister of Foreign Affairs, John Baird, issued a statement stating, "We fundamentally believe that Israel has the right to defend itself and its citizens from terrorist threats. Far too often, the Jewish people find themselves on the front lines in the struggle against terrorism, the great struggle of our generation. Just last weekend, more than 100 rockets rained down on civilians in southern Israel from positions in the Gaza Strip. Canada condemns the terrorist group Hamas and stands with Israel as it deals with regional threats to peace and security.”
Chile	The President of Chile, Sebastián Piñera, stated during a state visit to Turkey that Chile supports "Palestines right to a free, independent and autonomous state" at the same time Chile supported Israels right to "have safety and peace at its frontiers". On 17 November around 100 persons protested outside the Israeli embassy in Santiago disrupting traffic. The protest had not been authorized and protesters retired when carabineros arrived.
China	A spokesperson from the Ministry of Foreign Affairs of the People's Republic of China told reporters in a news conference that China expressed "concern" to the clashes and urge all sides, particularly Israel, to display "restraint" and avoid civilian casualties.
Cuba	Cuba expressed "strongly condemns" the Israeli operation and called on the international community to stop what he called a "criminal act".
Czech Republic	The Czech Foreign Ministry released a statement saying: "The Czech Republic deeply regrets the loss of civilian lives in Israel and Gaza as well as the current escalation of the situation. The Czech Republic fully recognizes Israel's right to self defense against rocket barrage carried out by the militant organizations in the Gaza Strip while underlining importance of avoiding civilian casualties. The Czech Republic calls on both sides to refrain from all forms of violence and provocative actions and to bring quiet to the civilian population of both sides.
Ecuador	Ecuador condemned the attacks carried out by Israel while criticizing the rocket attacks that Hamas fighters launched into southern Israel.
Egypt	The Egyptian ambassador was recalled to Cairo and Israel's ambassador received an official protest. Egyptian President Mohamed Morsi stated that "The Israelis must realise that this aggression is unacceptable and would only lead to instability in the region". Demanding that the Arab League call an urgent meeting of Arab foreign ministers to discuss "criminal Israeli aggression" on Gaza, and sought an immediate meeting of the UN Security Council. The Foreign Ministry of Egypt berated the operation and called on Israel to halt its attacks. According to The Guardian, the chairman of the Freedom and Justice party, Saad El-Katatni, said: "The Egyptian people revolted against injustice and will not accept an attack on Gaza. The brutal aggression on Gaza proves that Israel has not yet learned that Egypt has changed". An Egyptian official reported that Egyptian hospitals are ready to receive wounded Palestinians and that the Rafah Crossing will remain open. Egyptian Prime Minister Hisham Qandil visited Gaza on Friday, 16 November. On 17 November, the Arab Medical Union has sent a delegation of Egyptian doctors with aid across the Rafah border. On 19 November, a group of Egyptian civilians headed to Gaza to aid their Palestinian neighbors in their current tribulation.
France	French Foreign Minister Laurent Fabius acknowledged Israel's right to defend itself, but called for restraint. He said "It would be a catastrophe if there is an escalation in the region. Israel has the right to security, but it won't achieve it through violence". The French Foreign Ministry released a statement saying: "France is exceedingly worried about the deteriorating situation in Gaza and the South of Israel. It is calling on the parties to refrain from any escalation of violence since the Israeli and the Palestinian civilian population would inevitably pay the price." French ambassador to Israel Christophe Bigot visited Kiryat Malachi, where three Israeli civilians were killed, and expressed his solidarity with Israeli victims of rocket attacks.
Germany	German Foreign Minister Guido Westerwelle said: "It is obvious that Israel has a legitimate right to defend itself and protect its own citizens against rocket attacks from the Gaza Strip... Now it is necessary that everyone contributes to deescalating the situation. Everybody needs to understand that we need to prevent worse things from happening. We call upon all parties to act wisely and in a deescalating manner." A spokesperson for Chancellor Angela Merkel said: "Hamas in Gaza is responsible for the outbreak of violence. There is no justification for the shooting of rockets at Israel, which has led to massive suffering of the civilian population. The Chancellor urges those responsible in the Gaza Strip to immediately stop firing on Israel. At the same time she calls on the Egyptian government to use its influence on Hamas to limit the violence and bring it to an end."
Hungary	The Hungarian Foreign Ministry issued a statement saying that it was "following developments in the Middle East with deep concern, in particular the rocket attacks from the Gaza Strip against Israel and the ensuing military response in protection of the population. We regard it as a necessity that the sides exercise self-restraint and desist from the use of violence. We support all efforts which facilitate the termination of fighting."
India	The Indian government sought peace and cessation of all hostilities by Israel and Hamas and urged direct talks between the Palestine Authority in West Bank and Israel.
Iran	Foreign Ministry spokesman Ramin Mehmanparast berated the Israeli strikes, saying that they were a "sign of the regime's brutal nature".
Iraq	Iraq's envoy to the Arab League called on the Arab countries to "use the weapon of oil, with the aim of asserting real pressure on the United States and whoever stands with Israel".
Ireland	Irish Tánaiste and Minister for Foreign Affairs and Trade Eamon Gilmore said that "This latest round of violence, which was triggered by sustained rocket attacks on towns in Israel and has escalated with the targeted killing of a senior Hamas leader, could lead to the further death and suffering of innocent Israeli and Palestinian civilians. The risks from an escalation of violence on either side are all too apparent. I urge both sides to immediately cease these attacks and remove the threat they pose to the lives and safety of innocent people."
Italy	Italian Foreign Minister Giulio Terzi said that Hamas missile attacks posed "serious risks for the population" of Israel and invoked them as justification of Israel's response.
Jordan	Jordanian Information Minister Sameeh Maaytah said: "Israel's aggressive policy placed the area again in a cycle of violence and instability. This additional hostility... closes all doors on negotiations and the achievement of political arrangements. Israel deprives the Palestinian people of their political and national right to create an independent state... Israel's aggression needs to be stopped and the Palestinian people need to be protected."
Kazakhstan	Kazakhstan condemned Israel's operation. At 39th session of the Foreign Ministers Council of the Islamic Organization for Cooperation Kazakh Foreign Minister said "We condemn the air strikes of Israel on Gaza Strip that claimed lives of civilians and damaged infrastructure. As the history shows, the policy of repressions will not bring peace and security to Israel. Both parties have to immediately take measures to prevent any further escalation of the conflict, perform their obligations in the international humanitarian law and focus on resolution of the fundamental problems of Palestinian-Israeli conflict".
Kuwait	Foreign minister of Kuwait expressed sorrow for the "bloody developments in Gaza which was in violation of all international laws and agreements".
Latvia	Official statement of 18 November: "Foreign Minister Edgars Rinkēvičs strongly condemns the rocket attacks against Israeli territory by Hamas and other terrorist groups and calls on both sides to do their utmost for the regulation of the situation. While recognising the right of Israel to protect the security of its population, a proportionate balance of forces should be exercised in doing that to avoid any further civilian casualties.
Lebanon	The President of Lebanon condemned the war in Gaza, which claimed "was started by a monstrous Israeli attack." On the other hand, stated that "the policy of war and terrorism do not lead to lasting peace and not conducive to achieving democracy in the Middle East.
Libya	Libya condemned Israeli attacks on Gaza, calling them "criminal". Ministry of Foreign Affairs said in a statement that "these criminal attacks which resulted in the killing and wounding of dozens of the Palestinian people" were a challenge to the international community and to "resolutions of international legitimacy". The statement said the attacks exposed Israel's "aggressive, expansionist and terrorist" intentions and merited condemnation by the whole world.
Mauritania	The Mauritanian government denounced and condemned the "wicked Israeli attack on the Gaza strip". A communiqué issued by the Mauritanian Foreign Ministry extended condolences to the families of those killed in the Gaza strip. Nouakchott also urged the UN Security Council "to take up their responsibilities and take the needed measures to protect the Palestinian people against such attacks which jeopardizes security and stability in the region".
Malaysia	A motion that condemned Israeli attacks, was tabled on behalf of Prime Minister Najib Razak, and found bi-partisan support in the Parliament of Malaysia. The motion called on the UN Security Council to immediately enforce a cease-fire and deploy a peacekeeping force in Gaza.
Morocco	Morocco on expressed its deep concern and strong condemnation regarding Israel's ongoing large-scale military operation in the Gaza Strip, urging for "an immediate halt to these raids". According to a Ministry of Foreign Affairs statement, Morocco "considers that this dangerous escalation is unacceptable and that the continuation of these attacks could have disastrous consequences on the security and stability of the region. As a result, Morocco calls for an immediate halt to these raids and urges the international community to take its responsibility to protect the lives of the inhabitants of the Gaza Strip and their property".
Netherlands	Dutch Foreign Minister Frans Timmermans said Hamas is responsible for the escalation: "Hamas has attacked Israel by firing rockets over and over again. Doing this makes Hamas the main actor that is guilty for the Israeli reaction". He also said: "Let it be clear that the current created and unbelievable sorrow of the people in the Gaza strip is in first place the result of Hamas' actions". Beside that he stated: "Israel has the full right to defend itself as long as its does this in a proportional way". An official Foreign Ministry statement from 13 November said: "Foreign minister Frans Timmermans has condemned the mortar and rocket attacks against Israel carried out by militant groups in the Gaza Strip. The Netherlands recognises Israel's right to defend itself from this rocket fire. The escalating violence over the past several days is in no one's interests."
Norway	Norwegian Foreign Minister said he is worried about the escalation of violence between the Palestinians and Israelis of which leader of the Hamas military Ahmed Jabar was killed. He said the rocket attacks on Israel are "clearly unacceptable" and that Israel has a right to defend itself. He added that reactions must be proportional and must distinguish between combatants and non-combatants, refusing and postponing to say whether the Israeli response indeed was "within acceptable limits".
Pakistan	In a phone conversation with President Morsi of Egypt, Pakistani Prime Minister Raja Pervez Ashraf said that Pakistan strongly condemns Israeli air attacks in Gaza "that have targeted not only the Hamas leadership but also innocent civilians". He said Pakistan considers Israeli action as "a grave violation of international law and all humanitarian norms". He added that Israeli threats of a ground offensive against Gaza were even more disturbing. Raja also said that unless the Palestinian problem was resolved, peace in the Middle East would remain elusive. He expressed concern that the escalation in violence could lead to a spreading of conflict, which may engulf the region.
Qatar	After a meeting in the Saudi capital Riyadh between Gulf Cooperation Council Foreign Ministers and their Russian counterpart Sergei Lavrov to discuss Syrian civil war, Sheikh Hamad bin Jassim bin Jaber Al Thani told journalists "I condemn in the name of Qatar... This filthy crime must not pass without a punishment. The UN Security Council must shoulder its responsibilities in preserving peace and security in the world."
Romania	Romanian Foreign Minister Titus Corlăţean issued a press release stating: "The Ministry of Foreign Affairs ... hopes that Hamas will stop its military aggression and that both parties will refrain from escalating the conflict and will show restraint. It is extremely important to avoid escalation of violence, and this can be exploited on multiple fronts by regional groups with different agendas, which don't promote stability and security in the region."
Russia	Russian Foreign Minister Sergei Lavrov called for end to the violence after a meeting held with Gulf Arab foreign ministers in Riyadh. Foreign Ministry spokesman Alexander Lukashevich said: "The attacks on southern Israel, as well as Israel's disproportionate shelling, are entirely unacceptable. We urge all sides to end the military confrontation immediately and to prevent a new round of bloodshed in the Gaza Strip." Following a telephone conversation between President Putin and Netanyahu the presidential press service said that "The President of Russia called on the parties to exercise restraint and avoid the path of escalating violence, whose victims include civilians, and to do everything to return the situation to its normal course."
Saudi Arabia	Saudi Arabia expressed its condemnation of the "Israeli assaults on the Gaza Strip" and called for a stronger and more united Arab stance in the face of the "Israeli occupation practices". In his speech before the extraordinary meeting of the Arab League Council at the ministerial level held in Cairo, the Saudi Foreign Minister Nizar Madani said "It is no longer reasonable or acceptable to pass this new aggression unpunished and that Arab stances earlier which did not exceed words and sought, in vain, binding decisions of the Security Council made Israel careless of observing the Arab and international community's demands". Madani said "The Kingdom sees that it is time for the Palestinians to enjoy, like other peoples of the world, peace and security and to have a homeland free of violence, killing and destruction".
Sudan	Sudanese President Omar al-Bashir condemned the Israeli air strikes in Gaza, and called on all Islamic nations to join together to address the situation
Syria	The Syrian Government called Israel's actions "barbaric, reprehensible crimes" and called on the international community to pressure Israel into halting its strikes.
Tunisia	Tunisian foreign minister Rafik Abdessalem visited Gaza on 17 November, calling on the world to stop Israel's "blatant aggression" in Gaza, saying it was "no longer acceptable or legal by any standards".
Turkey	Prime Minister Recep Tayyip Erdogan accused Israel of aggressively attacking the armed organization in the Gaza Strip. According to Erdogan, Israel's strikes were motivated by the Knesset elections scheduled to take place in about two months. In a speech in Cairo University on 17 November 2012, "Everyone must know that sooner or later there will be a holding to account for the massacre of these innocent children killed inhumanely in Gaza," Erdogan also praised Egypt for recalling their ambassador to Israel. Foreign Ministry of Turkey condemned the Israeli strikes with a written statement. "We strongly condemn this Israeli attack and immediately demand that it be stopped," the statement said, adding that no country, Israel included, is above international law.
United Arab Emirates	The United Arab Emirates strongly condemned the "Israeli aggression on Gaza Strip" and urged the international community to "shoulder its responsibility towards the Palestinian people and to put an end to Israel's messing up with regional and international peace and stability".
United Kingdom	In a phone call with Benjamin Netanyahu, Prime Minister David Cameron said "the rocket attacks from Gaza into southern Israel by Hamas and other armed groups were completely unacceptable and that the increasing frequency of rocket attacks in recent days was the immediate cause of the situation." He added that "the priority must be to de-escalate the crisis." Foreign Secretary William Hague said: "Hamas bears principal responsibility for the current crisis. I utterly condemn rocket attacks from Gaza into southern Israel by Hamas and other armed groups. This creates an intolerable situation for Israeli civilians in southern Israel, who have the right to live without fear of attack from Gaza." He also called on all those involved "to avoid any action which risks civilian casualties or escalates the crisis." On 18 November, he warned that "a ground invasion of the Gaza Strip would lose Israel much international sympathy and support"
United States	President Barack Obama said: "The precipitating event here...that's causing the current crisis...was an ever-escalating number of missiles; they were landing not just in Israeli territory, but in areas that are populated. And there's no country on Earth that would tolerate missiles raining down on its citizens from outside its borders. So we are fully supportive of Israel's right to defend itself from missiles landing on people's homes and workplaces and potentially killing civilians. And we will continue to support Israel's right to defend itself." The U.S. Department of State issued a press release stating, "We strongly condemn the barrage of rocket fire from Gaza into southern Israel, and we regret the death and injury of innocent Israeli and Palestinian civilians caused by the ensuing violence." The statement offered support for Israel's right to self-defense and urged Israel to avoid civilian casualties in its military operations. State Department deputy spokesman Mark Toner said "We ask Egypt to use its influence in the region to help de-escalate the situation," adding that Hamas must stop its rocket attacks on Israel. "This is a situation that they've created by firing rockets on innocent Israeli civilians. You know, we obviously mourn civilian deaths on both sides. But the onus is on Hamas to stop its rocket attacks," According to the CNN/ORC International poll, conducted between 16th and 18 November, 57% of American public think " Israel is justified in taking military action in Gaza" and almost 60% of American public sympathize with Israel, while 13% sympathize with the Palestinians.
Venezuela	Venezuelan president, Hugo Chavez has condemned the Israeli airstrikes. "Another savage aggression against the Gaza Strip had begun. Once again, Israel is bombing the Gaza Strip." – Chavez told on a cabinet meeting.
Yemen	According to a statement released to the Saba News Agency from a government source, "Yemen has announced its strong condemnation and denunciation of the "brutal Zionist aggression on the Gaza Strip, and standing of the Yemeni people with their brothers in Palestine at all times". The unnamed spoken also said that "The Yemeni government calls for the international community to bare their responsibilities towards the Zionist offensive and take swift action to stop this brutal aggression". The Yemeni parliament has denounced the Israeli operation, considering it an "aggression against all Arab and Muslim countries" and calling for using oil as a weapon to end the Israeli operation. It called on the Arab parliaments and shoura councils to hold an urgent meeting to discuss the "Israeli aggression against Gaza", calling for visiting Gaza in sympathy with its people. On 17 November, Permanent Representative of Yemen to the Arab League, Mohammed al-Haisami called "all Arab states to put an end to the cruel Zionist aggression on the Gaza Strip and to stop the crimes committed by Israel on the Palestinian people". On 19 November, hundreds marched in Sana'a to "affirm their solidarity with those under siege in the Gaza strip". The demonstrators, which began at Change Square, marched to the local Hamas office in Haseba district.

== Non-governmental organizations ==
- Amnesty International said that both sides should stop the violence, and Ann Harrison, Deputy Director of Amnesty International's Middle East and North Africa Programme, said "The Israeli military must not carry out further indiscriminate attacks, or attacks in densely populated residential areas that will inevitably harm civilians." and "Palestinian armed groups in Gaza meanwhile must not fire indiscriminate rockets into Israel. The international community must put pressure on both sides to fully respect the laws of war and protect civilian lives and property."
- The Palestinian Centre for Human Rights called for intervention on the part of the international community to restore the rule of law. Remarking that all States are bound by a legal obligation to 'ensure respect' for international humanitarian law in all circumstances, it states that the international community's failure to hold Israel accountable for its behavior in the occupied Palestinian territory "has resulted in pervasive impunity."
- Human Rights Watch said that "Israeli and Palestinian forces alike need to make all feasible efforts to avoid harming civilians,” and "there is no justification for Palestinian armed groups unlawfully launching rockets at Israeli population centers.” It accused Israel of using disproportionate force in its attacks and of firing at rescuers of victims of Israeli shelling. In the wake of the ceasefire deal, HRW called on both sides to review policies that harm civilians, including Israel's "blanket ban on travel to the West Bank, and firing live ammunition to restrict Palestinians’ access to up to 35 percent of Gaza's farmland and 80 percent of its fishing waters." It has accused Israel of failing to provide information to justify the strike on the al-Dalu family home, which the group has condemned as unlawful, disproportionate and a war crime.
- The American Center for Law & Justice sent a legal brief to the U.N. Security Council, warning that there is no legal or moral defense for Hamas's "indiscriminate rocket attacks", "use of civilian buildings", and the "use of human shields." The organization added that Israel goes beyond the requirements of the law to protect innocent life and that under the laws of war "civilian deaths are the legal and moral responsibility of the terrorists."
- The Israeli human rights organization B'Tselem warned both sides about causing civilian deaths and stated that according to international humanitarian law, civilians must never be targeted and all measures must be taken to protect them. B'Tselem added that Hamas combatants, as well as other armed groups operating against Israel, fire at Israeli civilian targets from within Palestinian civilian areas and do not distinguish themselves from the civilian populations, actions which B'Tselem consider a war crime and "severe violation of International Humanitarian Law". B'Tselem pointed out that Israeli officials are using the conduct of militants to justify harm to Palestinian civilians and stated that the fact that Hamas combatants and other organizations commit war crimes does not automatically justify Israeli actions that harm civilians, and called upon Israel to follow its legal and moral duty to minimize as much as possible harm to civilians, despite Hamas' illegal conduct.

== Protests ==
Countries in which rallies and protests in support of the Palestinians took place included Malaysia, Indonesia, India, Pakistan, Turkey, Egypt, Yemen, Italy, United States, United Kingdom, Canada, Australia, New Zealand, Poland, South Africa, Germany, Belgium, Israel, Argentine, Chile, Venezuela, South Korea, Hong Kong, Norway and Japan. Countries in which rallies and protests in support of Israel included: the United States, the United Kingdom, South Africa, Australia, France, Argentina, Brazil, Canada, Chile, Guatemala, El Salvador, Finland, France, Germany, Israel, Netherlands, Norway, Poland, Spain and Sweden.
