= Embassy of the Maldives, Riyadh =

Diplomatic mission of the Maldives in Riyadh, Saudi Arabia

Embassy of Maldives, Riyadh
- Location: Saudi Arabia
- Address: 8, Abul Ezzu El Kharasani Lane Sulaimaniya, Riyadh - 114511 Kingdom of Saudi Arabia
- Opened: 12 May 2008
- Ambassador: Ahmed Sareer
- Website: MaldivesEmbassy

The Embassy of the Republic of Maldives in the Kingdom of Saudi Arabia (Dhivehi: ސަޢޫދީ ޢަރަބިއްޔާގައި ހުންނަ ދިވެހިރާއްޖޭގެ އެމްބަސީ, Arabic: سفارة جزر المالديف في المملكة العربية السعودية, Japanese: 在サウジアラビア王国モルディブ大使館, also known as the Embassy of Maldives in Riyadh) is an embassy established by the Maldives in Riyadh, the capital of Saudi Arabia.

In 1981, diplomatic relations were established between Saudi Arabia and the Maldives. In November 2007, it was decided to establish the Maldives Embassy, the first in the Middle East, and on 12 May 2008, Saudi Arabia's State Minister for Foreign Affairs, Nizar Bin Obaid Madani attended. It was officially opened by Abdulla Shahid, the then-Minister of Foreign Affairs of the Maldives.

== Address ==
8, Abul Ezzu El Kharasani Lane, Sulaimaniya, Riyadh, 114511, Kingdom of Saudi Arabia

== Ambassador ==
Since 30 October 2024, Ahmed sareer has been serving as Ambassador Extraordinary and Plenipotentiary.

== Former Ambassadors ==
- Mohamed Khaleel (6 July 2019 to 18 November 2023)
- Abdullah Hameed (18 August 2015 – 15 December 2018)
- Adam Hassan (1 February 2011 – 22 March 2014)
- Hussain Shihab (11 May 2008 – 24 November 2010)

== Related ==
- Maldives–Saudi Arabia relations
