= Hussain Rasheed Ahmed =

Maldivian politician and islamic scholar

- ހުސެއިން ރަޝީދު އަހުމަދު
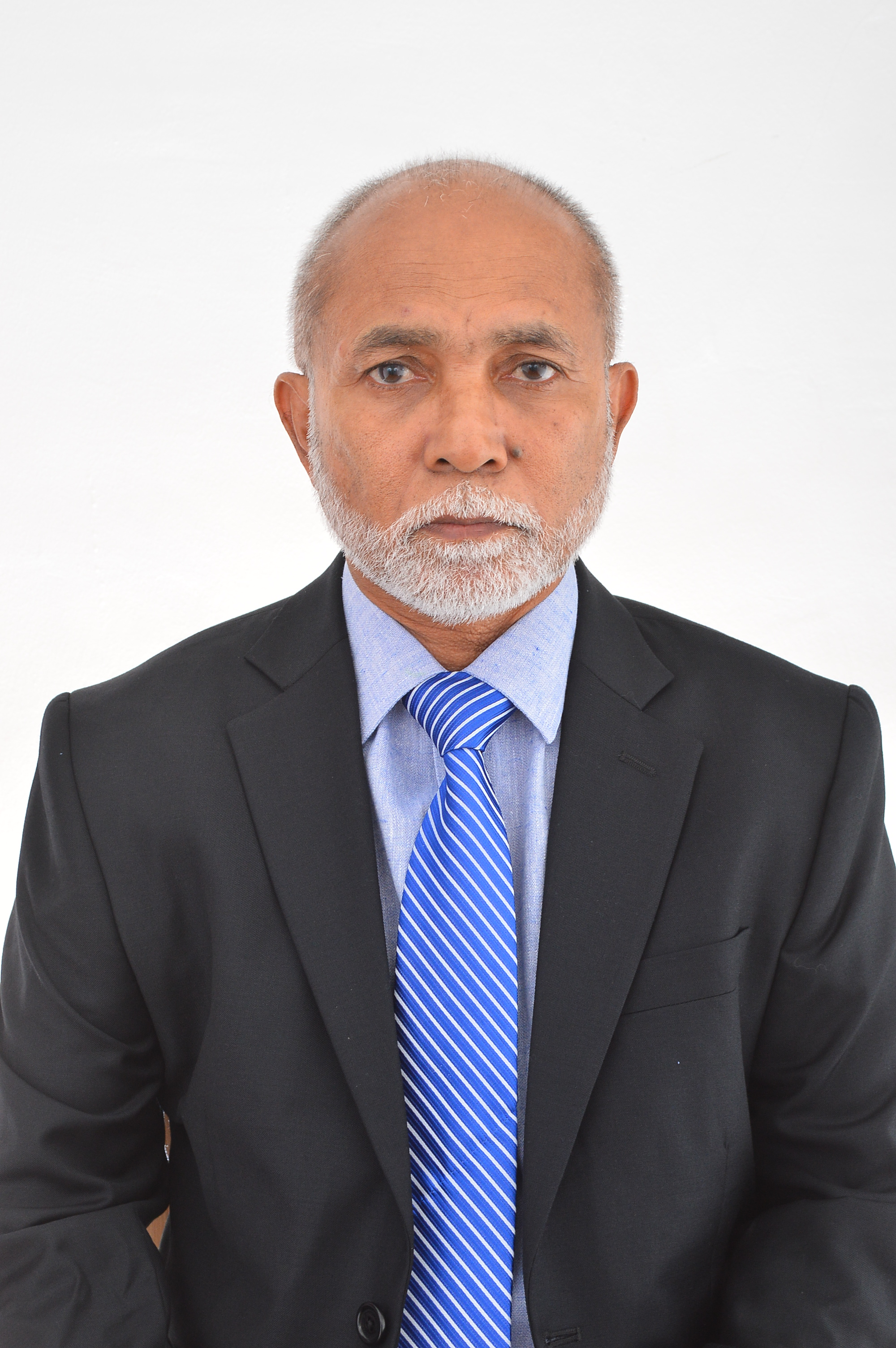
- Ahmed in 2019

Minister of State for Islamic Affairs
- In office 23 December 2010 – 7 February 2012
- President: Mohamed Nasheed

Minister of State for Home Affairs
- In office 24 Nov 2009 – 23 December 2010
- President: Mohamed Nasheed

Personal details
- Party: Maldivian Democratic Party
- Other political affiliations: Adhaalath Party (2005–2011)
- Children: 7

Hussain Rasheed Ahmed (Dhivehi: ހުސެއިން ރަޝީދު އަހުމަދު) is a Maldivian Islamic scholar and politician who served as the first president of the Adhaalath Party from 2009 to 2011. He had also served in other positions within the Maldivian government during his career

== Career ==
Ahmed served as one of the founding members of the Adhaalath Party as well as the president of the party until 2011. He later left the party in December.

In 2009, Ahmed was appointed by President Mohamed Nasheed as a member of the presidential commission to investigate the alleged embezzlement of state funds and resources of the Gayoom government. He was later appointed as the Minister of State for Home Affairs by President Nasheed in November 2009.

In 2010, Ahmed became the co-chair of the commission following a reconstitution following the resignation of some members. He was also appointed as the Minister of State for Islamic Affairs by President Nasheed.

In 2019. Ahmed was appointed by President Ibrahim Mohamed Solih as the Additional Secretary at the Ministry of Foreign Affairs. He had also served as Minister Counselor at the Maldivian Embassy in Riyadh as well as Consul General in Saudi Arabia.

== Personal life ==
Ahmed is married and has a child.

In 2010, while Ahmed was driving in his motorcycle near Masjidhul Sulthaan Mohamed-bin-Abdulla, he was attacked causing him to fall from his cycle. Ahmed called his attack politically motivated.

In 2016, Ahmed was arrested inside the Islamic Centre when he was the imam, later being released the same day.
