= General debate of the seventy-third session of the United Nations General Assembly =

United Nations General Debate Assembly

- 25 September – 1 October 2018 73rd session 73rd general debate

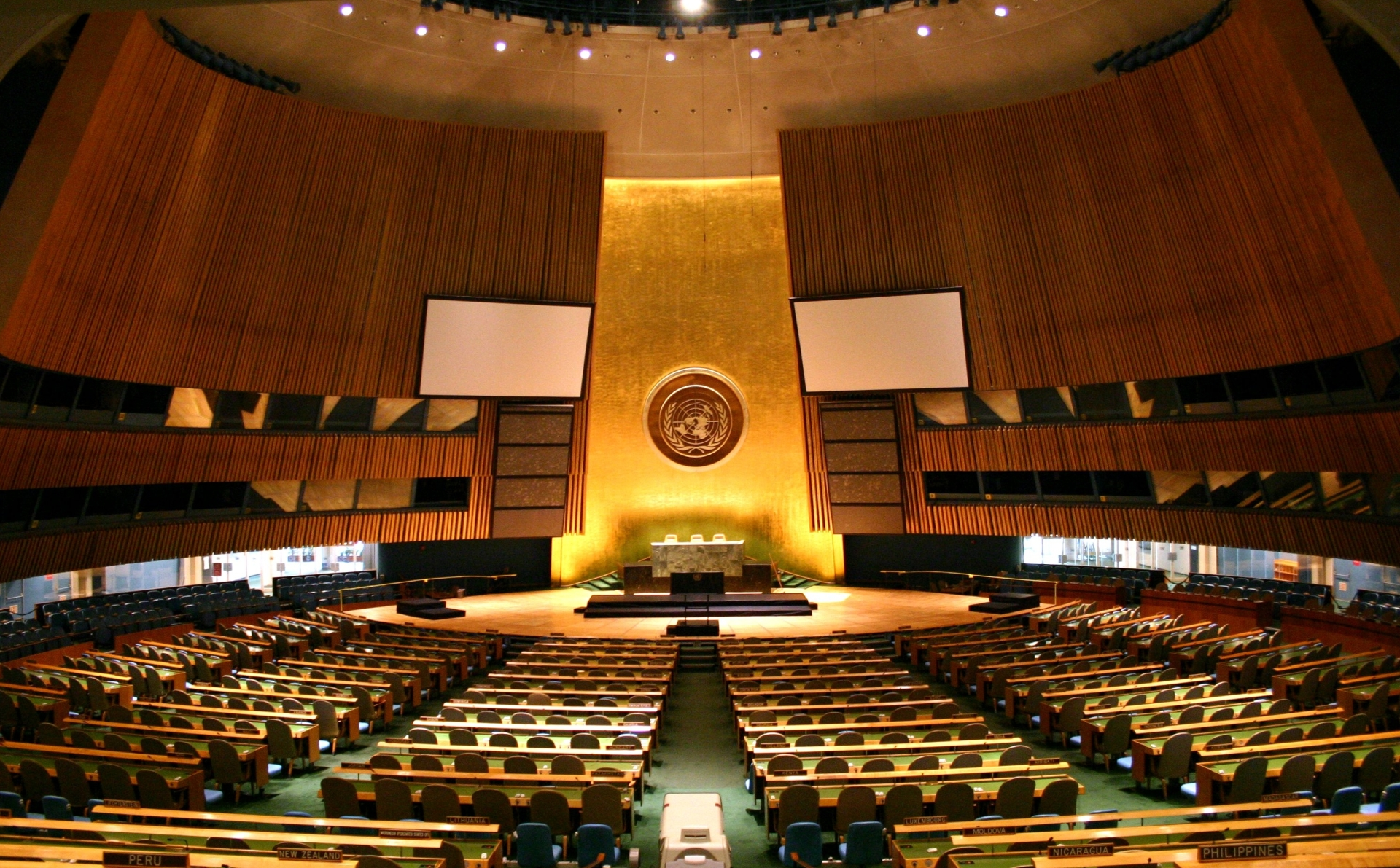
- General Assembly Hall at United Nations Headquarters, New York City
- Host country: United Nations
- Cities: New York City, United States
- Venues: General Assembly Hall at the United Nations Headquarters
- Participants: United Nations Member States
- President: María Fernanda Espinosa
- Secretary-General: António Guterres
- Website: gadebate.un.org/en/sessions-archive/73

The General debate of the seventy-third session of the United Nations General Assembly (UNGA) was opened on 25 September and ran until 1 October 2018. Leaders from a number of member states addressed the UNGA.

== Organisation and subjects ==
The order of speakers is given first to member states, then observer states and supranational bodies. Any other observers entities will have a chance to speak at the end of the debate, if they so choose. Speakers will be put on the list in the order of their request, with special consideration for ministers and other government officials of similar or higher rank. According to the rules in place for the General Debate, the statements should be in of the United Nations official languages of Arabic, Chinese, English, French, Russian or Spanish, and will be translated by the United Nations translators. Each speaker is requested to provide 20 advance copies of their statements to the conference officers to facilitate translation and to be presented at the podium. The theme for this year's debate was chosen by President María Fernanda Espinosa as: "Making the United Nations relevant to all people: Global leadership and shared responsibilities for peaceful, equitable and sustainable societies."

== Speaking schedule ==
Since 1955, Brazil and the United States are the first and second countries to speak. For this session, however, President of the United States Donald Trump arrived late, causing President Lenín Moreno of Ecuador to speak second. Other countries follow according to a speaking schedule issued by the Secretariat.

The list of speakers is provided by both the daily UN Journal, while changes in order are also reflected by the UNGA General Debate website.

=== 25 September ===
Morning session

- United Nations – Secretary-General António Guterres
- United Nations – 73rd Session of the United Nations General Assembly María Fernanda Espinosa
- Brazil – President Michel Temer
- Ecuador – Constitutional President Lenin Moreno Garcés
- United States – President Donald J. Trump
- Ecuador – Constitutional President Lenin Moreno Garcés (Scheduled)
- Turkey – President Recep Tayyip Erdoğan
- Rwanda – President Paul Kagame
- Mexico – President Enrique Peña Nieto
- France – President Emmanuel Macron
- Seychelles – President Danny Faure
- Peru – President Martín Vizcarra
- Jordan – King Abdullah II ibn Al Hussein
- Qatar – Amir Tamim bin Hamad Al -Thani
- Iran – President Hassan Rouhani
- Finland – President Sauli Niinistö
- Croatia – President Kolinda Grabar-Kitarović (Scheduled)
- Togo – President Faure Gnassingbé (Scheduled)
- Nigeria – President Muhammadu Buhari
- South Africa – President Cyril Ramaphosa

Evening session (Note: Session started immediately after a formal closing of the previous one.)

- Guatemala – President Jimmy Morales
- Malawi – President Arthur Peter Mutharika
- Guatemala – President Jimmy Morales (Scheduled)
- Egypt – President Abdel Fattah al-Sisi
- Paraguay – President Mario Abdo Benítez
- Argentina – President Mauricio Macri
- Switzerland – President Alain Berset
- Sri Lanka – President Maithripala Sirisena
- Slovenia – President Borut Pahor
- Zambia – President Edgar Chagwa Lungu
- Democratic Republic of the Congo – President Joseph Kabila Kabange
- Kyrgyzstan – President Sooronbay Jeenbekov
- The Gambia – President Adama Barrow
- Marshall Islands – President Hilda Heine
- Bosnia and Herzegovina – Chairman of the Presidency Bakir Izetbegović
- Mozambique – President Filipe Jacinto Nyusi (Scheduled)
- Marshall Islands – President Hilda Heine (Scheduled)
- Dominican Republic – President Danilo Medna Sánchez
- Japan – Prime Minister Shinzō Abe
- Armenia – Prime Minister Nikol Pashinyan
- Morocco – Prime Minister Saad-Eddine El Othmani

=== 26 September ===
Morning session

- Panama – President Juan Carlos Varela Rodríguez
- Namibia – President Hage Geingob
- Ghana – President Nana Addo Dankwa Akufo-Addo
- Estonia – President Kersti Kaljulaid
- Lebanon – President Michel Aoun
- Croatia – President Kolinda Grabar-Kitarović
- Yemen – President Abdrabuh Mansour Hadi Mansour (Note: The government of Yemen is disputed between a parliament sitting in the national capital of Sanaa and another that is temporarily sitting in Aden.)
- Uruguay – President Tabaré Vázquez
- Colombia – President Iván Duque Márquez
- Uruguay – President Tabaré Vázquez (Scheduled)
- Tonga – King Tupou VI
- Mali – President Ibrahim Boubacar Keita
- Angola – President João Manuel Gonçalves Lourenço
- Cuba – President of the Council of Ministers Miguel Díaz-Canel Bermudez
- Liberia – President George Manneh Weah
- Slovakia – President Andrej Kiska
- South Korea – President Moon Jae-in
- Romania – President Klaus Werner Iohannis
- United Kingdom of Great Britain and Northern Ireland – Prime Minister Theresa May
- Afghanistan – Chief Executive Abdullah Abdullah
- Italy – President of the Council of Ministers Giuseppe Conte

Evening session

- Cabo Verde – President Jorge Carlos de Almeida Fonseca
- Eswatini – King Mswati III
- Ukraine – President Petro Poroshenko
- Eswatini – King Mswati III (Scheduled)
- Honduras – President Juan Orlando Hernández Alvarado
- Kenya – President Uhuru Kenyatta
- Kiribati – President Taneti Maamau
- Zimbabwe – President Emmerson Dambudzo Mnangagwa
- Poland – President Andrzej Duda
- Portugal – President Marcelo Rebelo de Sousa
- El Salvador – President Salvador Sánchez Cerén
- Nauru – President Baron Divavesi Waqa
- Bolivia – President Evo Morales Ayma
- Palau – President Tommy Esang Remengesau, Jr.
- Venezuela – President Nicolás Maduro Moros
- Central African Republic – Head of State Faustin Archange Touadera
- Kuwait – Prime Minister Sheikh Jaber Al-Mubarak Al-Hamad Al-Sabah
- Luxembourg – Prime Minister Xavier Bettel
- Norway – Prime Minister Erna Solberg (Scheduled)
- Netherlands – Prime Minister Mark Rutte
- Norway – Prime Minister Erna Solberg

==== Right of Reply ====
Member states have the option to reply to comments on the day (or even to the days prior), but are limited to 10 minutes for the first response and five minutes for the second response. All speeches are made from the floor, as opposed to the podium for the General Debate.

Azerbaijan's delegate took the floor to reply to Armenia in saying that the prime minister talks of the Velvet Revolution while he is the same as his predecessors. He added words needed to be put into action to mean something. This ought to start with the start with return of Azeris to Nagorno-Karabakh (NKO), the occupied districts and some exclaves. He suggested that Armenia had ethnically expelled non-Armenians while other minorities, including Armenians, were living in Baku and elsewhere in the country.

Armenia then replied to Azerbaijan's statement.

Azerbaijan took the floor for the second time in saying that it demanded cessation of hostilities first and foremost from Armenian forces. "Armenia intentionally disregarded the Security Council to establish a stable ceasefire. Events before and after each resolution makes clear that Armenia issues baseless allegations and leave no doubt as to who continues hostilities. [There is] no doubt claims by Armenia run counter to the norms of international law and are without foundation. NKO and the seven surrounding districts of Azerbaijan are under Armenian military occupation. Armenia has established a subordinate regime that is unrecognized and under the control of Armenia. This was formed by racism[, etc]. Armenia's claims are a threat to peace and security. [Armenia's actions are a result] of deep political crisis and the economic situation in that country. [There is] no doubt the international community has not heard from the Armenian delegation and what problems the economy faces: an economic drop and high [em]migration of its citizens. Neither the prime minister nor the delegation, in the statement, mentioned any efforts the government makes [in this regard] and to implement the Development Goals. [There is] silence because there is nothing to say. As I said before and will stress again, the earlier Armenia realises the lack of any prospect for its dangerous agenda, the quicker the conflict would be solved and the two countries will benefit from peace..."

Armenia then used its second reply to say that one should recall media outlets which featured all the details and descriptions given on the "massacre of the Armenian population in Azerbaijan. Who attack who first, how it started, what was the source [of the conflict]...it is important that people read the papers from 30 years ago not today because today from Azerbaijan they are merely lying on what happened 30 years ago. Unfortunately, there is no single human rights activist, human rights defender [or anyone] who speaks freely in Azerbaijan because those who spoke correctly are behind bars these days. The Security Council's call for hostilities to stop was made by Armenia on May 1, 1994 when it was willing to sign a ceasefire of the de facto NKO, Armenia signed on to it. The main parties are Azerbaijan and NKO authorities. It is awful to see what happens in Azerbaijan...[unlike] any visitor from any country in the world, whether for tourism or business, [would see NKO] is sincere in its values. [Meanwhile] all the blackmail is made by Azerbaijan to limit freedom to travel, freedom of movement [on NKO authorities]. NKO is fully abiding by...unilaterally abiding by rules. It has unilaterally ratified important UN convention like the civil and political rights, rights of the child, economic and social rights and other important documents. Armenia will be soon presenting...sorry NKO [will be] voluntary presenting its national review for high level review on developmental goals progress. the threat is only from Azerbaijan. This is exacerbated by a 1,000 Azerbaijani citizens fighting in the so-called Azeri Brigade of ISIS who have appeared on the border. They have declared to leave Raqqa to fight NKO...[to restart the war but have] luckily, and not surprisingly, and logically lost the war they had again started by Azerbaijan. Peace negotiations are in the format of the OSCE Minsk Group. The main principles put forth are [1.] the non use of force of threat of force, [2.] territorial integrity, and the [3.] rights of the people. Azerbaijan seemingly forgets self-determination and territorial integrity. The solution is in the negotiation format and these are the three important principles.

=== 27 September ===
Morning session

- Lithuania – President Dalia Grybauskaitė
- Botswana – President Mokgweetsi Eric Keabetswe Masisi
- Cyprus – President Nicos Anastasiades
- Chile – President Sebastián Piñera Echeñique (Scheduled)
- (North Macedonia) Republic of Macedonia – President Gjorge Ivanov
- Equatorial Guinea – President Teodoro Obiang Nguema Mbasogo
- Haiti – President Jovenel Moïse
- Chile – President Sebastián Piñera Echeñique
- Sierra Leone – President Julius Maada Bio
- Palestine – President Mahmoud Abbas
- European Union – President of the European Council Donald Tusk
- Belgium – Prime Minister Charles Michel
- Israel – Prime Minister Benjamin Netanyahu
- Malta – Prime Minister Joseph Muscat
- Georgia – Prime Minister Mamuka Bakhtadze
- Vietnam – Prime Minister Nguyen Xuan Phuc
- Jamaica – Prime Minister Andrew Holness
- New Zealand – Prime Minister Jacinda Ardern
- Saint Vincent and the Grenadines – Prime Minister Ralph Gonsalves

Evening session

- Benin – President Patrice Athanase Guillaume Talon (Scheduled)
- Micronesia – President Peter Christian
- Guinea-Bissau – President José Mário Vaz
- Comoros – President Azali Assoumani
- Madagascar – President ad interim Rivo Rakotovao
- Indonesia – Vice President Muhammad Jusuf Kalla
- Ivory Coast – Vice President Daniel Kablan Duncan
- Costa Rica – Vice President Epsy Campbell Barr
- Nepal – Prime Minister K.P. Sharma Oli
- Tuvalu – Prime Minister Enele Sosene Sopoaga
- Bangladesh – Prime Minister Sheikh Hasina
- Spain – President of the Government Pedro Sánchez Pérez-Castejón
- Serbia – Prime Minister Ana Brnabić
- Uganda – Prime Minister Ruhakana Rugunda
- Bhutan – Acting Head of Government Lyonpo Tshering Wangchuk
- Mauritania – Minister of Foreign Affairs Ismail Ould Cheikh Ahmed
- Liechtenstein – Minister for Foreign Affairs, Justice and Culture Aurelia Frick
- Cameroon – Minister of Foreign Affairs Lejeune Mbella Mbella
- United Republic of Tanzania – Minister for Foreign Affairs and East African Cooperation Augustine Phillip Mahiga
- Djibouti – Minister for Foreign Affairs and International Cooperation Mahamoud Ali Youssouf
- Ethiopia – Minister of Foreign Affairs Workineh Gebeyehu Negewo
- Togo – Minister for Foreign Affairs, Cooperation and Regional Integration Robert Dussey

==== Right of Reply ====
Iran replied to the "Israeli regime. The Israeli regime has a long history in following opportunistic policies to mislead others. The intention of this psychological reactionary behaviour is to divert attention from its savage and inhuman actions against Palestinians and other Arab nations. This has brought so much suffering, caused so many crises and caused so much instability and brought anger to the region. The Israeli regime continues to be the top spoiler of stability and peace in the region and the Middle East. The Israeli showman has no temerity particularly to accuse Iran. His fallacies in his statements confirm his pathological tendencies...distort reality. This is to distract attention from his regimes inherent cruelty towards Palestinians. To cover up the killing of defenseless, innocent women and children. To cover the fact that millions of Palestinians have been taken hostage by Israel for decades...[it is the] last apartheid regime in the world...[It] conceal[s] reality that this is the only regime in the world that openly practices racism...[it maintains] the worlds biggest open prison, Gaza. [Netanyahu] stands here once again to make a statement filled with despicable lies. No amount of lies, no amount of application will cover up the criminal nature of Israel. This is a dreadfully regressive and undemocratic regime led by a corrupt leader who pretends to be progressive and democratic. [The] Israel[i] prime minister...[is] very close to, namely, Daesh. Israel['s] absurd claim of being democratic has [re-]called similar [to] that [of the] Nazis used to make before dragging the world into destruction. Democracy for [a] racist [government] that crushes the dreams of the true owners of Palestine for self-determination. That is a mockery of democracy. That is the tyranny of racists. In fact, Israel is the enemy of democracy in the Middle East. It hates democracy...there would be no room for Israel in the Middle East should democracy prevail. The Israel[i] regime that rejects all UN purposes and principles in its practices and policies and defies all UN resolutions only uses this august assembly to mislead others. As an example lets see how many UN resolutions [have been] violated by Israel. It is about 300 [ranging] from weapons of mass destruction, to a nuclear weapons free zone in the Middle East. On the Israel-Palestinian related issue alone Israel has violated 225 United Nations Security Council resolutions; at least resolution 2324 calls for an end to Israeli settlement building. on 20 September 2018, almost all members. of course except Israeli big patron [the] U.S...urged [for a] to end defying the resolution. Israel holds the record of ignoring [the most] UNSC resolutions, the symbol of international law. To do [so] relies mainly on [the] U.S. to date. [The] U.S. has used its veto power a total of 44 times to shield Israel from Security Council draft resolutions for Israel. Mister President, exhibiting some photographs...[as they did] today the Israeli showman claims [to have] discovered new nuclear facilities in Iran. This is yet another false story. It is not surprising as [he is] lying...[with] such publications. He should stop threatening Iran with nuclear annihilation, as he did recently. Such an infantile statement against a NPT party constitutes a serious violation of international law and the UN charter. Recalling [that] the Israeli regime has attacked two nuclear facilities in the region in the past, the Security Council should strongly condemn threats by this regime to use such weapons on Iran. It should also be compelled to its abandon its nuclear weapons, to accede to the NPT without pre-conditions and place all of its nuclear facilities under IAEA safeguards. this regime should stop the de-stabilising conduct and frequent encouragement against the countries of the region. [It should stop] its regular violation of Syrian and Lebanese air space and put an end to its various airstrikes to targets in Syria. These airstrikes serve as support to terrorist groups. Let's be clear, we watch Israel's criminal behaviour wherever they do it. The time [of] Israel hitting its neighbours with impunity is passed. I thank you, Madam President."

=== 28 September ===
Morning session

- Albania – President Ilir Meta
- Guyana – Vice President Carl Barrington Greenidge
- South Sudan – First Vice President Taban Deng Gai
- Bulgaria – Prime Minister Boyko Borissov
- Samoa – Prime Minister Tuilaepa Sailele Malielegaoi
- China – State Councilor and Minister for Foreign Affairs Wang Yi
- Denmark – Prime Minister Lars Løkke Rasmussen (Scheduled)
- Vanuatu – Prime Minister Charlot Salwai Tabimasmas
- Saint Lucia – Prime Minister Allen Michael Chastanet
- Malaysia – Prime Minister Mahathir Mohamad
- Andorra – Head of Government Antoni Martí Petit
- Fiji – Prime Minister Josaia Voreqe Bainimarama
- Greece – Prime Minister Alexis Tsipras
- Montenegro – Prime Minister Duško Marković (Scheduled)
- Mauritius – Prime Minister Pravind Kumar Jugnauth
- Greece – Prime Minister Alexis Tsipras (Scheduled)
- Montenegro – Prime Minister Duško Marković
- Cambodia – Prime Minister Samdech Akka Moha Sena Padei Techo Hun Sen
- Russia – Foreign Minister Sergey Lavrov
- Germany – Foreign Minister Heiko Maas
- Tunisia – Foreign Minister Khemais Jhinaoui
- Iraq – Foreign Minister Ibrahim Abdulkarim Al-Jafari
- Denmark – Minister for Development Cooperation Ulla Tørnæs

Evening session

- Saint Kitts and Nevis – Prime Minister Timothy Harris
- Bahamas – Prime Minister Hubert Alexander Minnis
- Lesotho – Prime Minister Thomas Motsoahae Thabane
- Antigua and Barbuda – Prime Minister Gaston Alphonso Browne
- Moldova – Prime Minister Pavel Filip
- Barbados – Prime Minister Mia Amor Mottley
- Solomon Islands – Prime Minister Ricky Nelson Houenipwela
- Mongolia – Prime Minister Khurelsukh Ukhnaa
- Ireland – Deputy Prime Minister Simon Coveney
- Saudi Arabia – Foreign Minister Adel Ahmed Al-Jubeir
- Hungary – Minister for Foreign Affairs and Foreign Trade Péter Szijjártó
- Monaco – Minister for Foreign Affairs and International Cooperation Gilles Tonelli
- Australia – Foreign Minister Marise Payne
- Kazakhstan – Foreign Minister Kairat Abdrakhmanov
- Myanmar – Union Minister for the Office of the State Counsellor Kyaw Tint Swe
- Iceland – Foreign Minister Gudlaugur Thór Thórdarson
- Azerbaijan – Foreign Minister Elmar Maharram oglu Mammadyarov
- Chad – Minister for Foreign Affairs, Cooperation and Regional Integration Mahamat Zene Cherif
- Guinea – Foreign Minister Mamadi Touré
- Libya – Foreign Minister Mohamed Siala (Note: The government of Libya is disputed between a parliament sitting in the national capital of Tripoli and another that is temporarily sitting in Tobruk.)

==== Right to Reply ====
Qatar responded to the comments by Saudi Arabia and the United Kingdom in Arabic.

Indonesia responded in regards to West Papua comments made by Vanuatu. The delegate said that "these countries have it in their heads that the group of people are different...Mayhem creates fatalities to one's own families. Indonesia categorically rejects any efforts to disturb West Papua...[to] accuse Indonesia of gross violations of human rights is serious and unacceptable. No country in the world is free from human rights [aggressions] or other challenges. One has so many problems of its own [that this] is like the pot calling the kettle black. Vanuatu is not part a party to [many human rights] instruments; Indonesia is a party to eight out of nine. Vanuatu is not a party to the convention to eliminate all forms of racial discrimination. Indonesia is diverse and comprising of hundreds of ethnic groups, thousands of tribes and hundreds of languages. [We are] not defined by racial identity but are diverse. Just to remind Vanuatu, customary international law of the convention of 1933 on the rights and duties of states clearly stipulated four elements [in regards to]: 1. population; 2. territory; 3. government; 4. capacity [for] relations with other states. [It] never [mentions matters] on race for rights to be in conflict. Let me remind Vanuatu of history. Almost 50 years on this very same forum, in this very same group, in this very same august chamber, all of us in the UN have decided the final status of West Papua as an integral and legitimate part...[the] resolution of 1969...was adopted with no country's voting against [it]. The people of Papua affirm their unity with Indonesia. In other words, what Vanuatu is propagating is an outrageous challenge to Indonesia. [The] decision [made] by the then 128 members, almost half a century ago...[is a prerequisite] Indonesia and every responsible member of the UN [is in line with the] Charter. For that reason Vanuatu['s claims]...against Indonesia violates the principle of the Charter and that should be enough. Since last year, Vanuatu incorporates [such] people into its delegation. Such hostility has no place in the UN system. No country that supports [the] dismember[ment] of any country should now sit at the UN. We could not care less what motiv[ations there] are. Indonesia strongly and firmly defends its sovereignty, territorial integrity and dignity."

Saudi Arabia responded to Qatar to (in Arabic) in saying that the comments made by Qatar came from a country that "supports extremists and incites violence for a long time. [It is the] headquarters of political Islam and [hosts] many extremist organisations, such as the Nusra Front...and allows factions on its television screens. One Al-Qaeda member entered Qatar...and Saudi Arabia arrested some members when they entered in[to] our country, Qatar and the U.S.A. knows [this]. Qatar supports separatists in Saudi Arabia and U.A.E. to destabilise the region...is not terrorism of Saudi Arabia, in fact Qatar supports and finances terrorism...[that] my governments prevents Qatari pilgrims is not true; we welcome them after completing administrative procedures. The data is registered on our website; all digital transactions are complete. Qatari pilgrims have rights and have chosen different packages, like pilgrims from elsewhere in the world. They arrive at the airports and on Qatar Airways.

Qatar then responded to Saudi Arabia on its second intervention (in Arabic) in saying "when in June 2017 Saudi Arabia tried to make an act of aggression through its embargo against the sovereignty and is rejected by international law. Qatar suffered from a mendacious approach. [One] can see [this] through Saudi media on this accusation. It is bizarre that this mendacious accusation is at UNGA where one should discuss how to strengthen international relations between countries. We reject [the comments by] by The Saudi delegation and insist Qatar will do [its] best to prosper...while protecting human rights. [It is] best to build stability and fight terrorism in our region. President, I will not be able to speak again since this is the second right to reply in General Assembly procedures. [We] reserve the right to respond to accusations in writing and have [it] in the minutes of [the] meetings."

=== 29 September ===
Morning session

- Latvia – Foreign Minister Edgars Rinkēvičs
- Papua New Guinea – Minister for Foreign Affairs and Foreign Trade Rimbink Pato
- Oman – Foreign Minister Yousuf bin Alawi bin Abdallah
- India – Foreign Minister Sushma Swaraj
- Syria – Deputy Prime Minister Syrian Arab Republic– Walid Al-Moualem
- North Korea – Foreign Minister Ri Yong Ho
- Algeria – Foreign Minister Abdelkader Messahel
- Suriname – Foreign Minister Yldiz Pollack-Beigle
- Singapore – Foreign Minister Vivian Balakrishnan
- San Marino – Minister for Foreign and Political Affairs and Justice Nicola Renzi
- Philippines – Secretary of Foreign Affairs Alan Peter Cayetano
- Austria – Federal Minister for Europe, Integration and Foreign Affairs Karin Kneissl
- Bahrain – Foreign Minister Shaikh Khalid Bin Ahmed Al-Khalifa
- Canada – (Scheduled)
- Pakistan – (Scheduled)
- Brunei Darusallam – (Scheduled)
- Burundi – Minister for Foreign Affairs and International Cooperation Ezéchiel Nibigira
- Brunei Darusallam – Second Minister of Foreign Affairs and Trade Dato Erywan Pehin Yusof
- Pakistan – Foreign Minister Makhdoom Shah Mahmood Qureshi
- Trinidad and Tobago – Foreign Minister Denis Moses
- United Arab Emirates – Minister for Foreign Affairs and International Cooperation Sheikh Abdullah Bin Zayed Al Nahyan

Evening session

- Turkmenistan – President Gurbanguly Berdimuhamedov
- Czech Republic – Deputy Prime Minister Jan Hamáček
- Laos – Foreign Minister Saleumxay Kommasith
- Belize – Minister for Foreign Affairs and Foreign Trade Wilfred Elrington
- Eritrea – Foreign Minister Osman Mohammed Saleh
- Sao Tome and Principe – Foreign Minister Urbino José Gonçalves Botelho
- Senegal – Foreign Minister Sidiki Kaba
- Niger – Minister for Foreign Affairs, Cooperation and Regional Integration Kalla Ankourao
- Dominica – Foreign Minister Francine Baron
- Congo – Foreign Minister Jean-Claude Gakosso
- Grenada – Foreign Minister Peter David
- Somalia – Foreign Minister Ahmed Awad Isse
- Burkina Faso – Minister for Foreign Affairs and International Cooperation Alpha Barry

==== Right to Reply ====
Qatar responded (in Arabic) to the "false accusations mentioned in the statements of the U.A.E. and Bahrain. Mister chairman…[we have]developed consensus that Qatar is innocent of the accusations targeted at it. In fact, we are active in promoting peace...These fake accusation have never been substantiated by any credible international party...[and, thus, they] violate international human rights law. What the cause of suspicion is that we find these states throw allegations and do not practice what they preach, [they] do not practice sovereignty and interfere in the sovereignty of other states. [They] do not respect human rights... [they] financed [an] unsuccessful coup attempt in Qatar, [they then] implemented a blockade on Qatar. [They] continue to lie and lie until people are expected to believe [them], [all the while] using modern technology in [such] attempts. The U.A.E. has...to finance greatest acts of terrorist in modern days [and it] allows perpetrators to escape through its territory. While states pretend to combat terrorism, everyone knows terror is launched from these countries...[It is]regrettable [that this has] reached this level of conspiracies. [It is] regrettable Bahrain...represents [a] real crisis with[in its] lines of leadership in Bahrain. Instead of solving internal issues [it prefers] fabrications...[and] holding conferences and presenting misleading discourse. Results [are] never in Bahrain's favour thus [it is] necessary to exercise this Right of Reply. The situation in Bahrain does not allow [them] to speak of human rights. Bahrain should commit to international conventions and respect human rights...[it should also] know that solving domestic issues [will] not be attained by false allegation. Bahrain should best apply [solutions that do not] seek to marginalize its own citizen [instead of] unilateral measures that are illegal[y] taken by Bahrain against my country...[It would be better] to achieve prosperity and combat terrorism. Mister chairman,...[it is] no longer a secret U.A.E. is irresponsible in its behaviour in other regions. It is attempting to destabilise regional bodies like the GCC. [It is] disrespecting international law and the principle of good neighbourliness. The U.A.E. evade[d] implementation of Security Council resolutions. [It has] become widely known U.A.E. relies on mercenary, mercenary companies in the region. It uses espionage...[against] regional countries...[As a result of] the U.A.E.'s record in the region and [on] the international stage...any sane person knows the U.A.E. ignores international conventions and destabilises the Middle East and Africa and beyond. [It has] become the leading party to destabilise and to destroy. The U.A.E. punishes freedom of expression with 15 years of prison. [In]Yemen,...[there have been] crimes against humanity by the U.A.E. Last July the International Court of Justice issued a verdict against the U.A.E. because of its discrimination to[wards] Qatari nationals and [in regards to the] Convention to Combat all Forms of Racial Discrimination. The U.A.E. [promised it would be] reuniting families; offering opportunities to Qatari students affected by [the] U.A.E.['s] policies in order to resume [their] studies in the U.A.E.; and 3. allowing Qatari nationals to have access to [the] U.A.E. courts. Mister chairman, this decision by the International Court of Justice is the best evidence against the U.A.E. [and] reveals its role in the fabricated crisis against Qatar....I wonder how has the U.A.E. respects human rights [in the body] it [has been] appointed to."

India responded to Pakistan in saying: "Mister President, my delegation came to this august assembly to listen to the new foreign minister of Pakistan...what we heard is [a] new Pakistan cast in the mold of the old Pakistan. Mister president, [I] take the floor to reply [and] reject the baseless allegations of Pakistan. Amongst the most outrageous was...on [the attack at the] Peshawar school four years ago. Let me recollect, [there was an] outpouring of pain in India following the massacre. Both houses of India's parliament expressed solidarity and memory to those killed. Schools all over India held two minutes of silence in memory. [Their comments are a] despicable claim to the memory of [those] killed...Pakistan [has] created [attempts] to destabilise neighbours...let me make clear Jammu and Kashmir will remain an integral part of India. Mister president, we have heard Pakistan has turned the tide on terrorism. Let us fact check them. Can Pakistan deny it is the host of [several] terrorist groups[, including] 22 sanctioned by the UN sanctions regime as of today? Will Pakistan deny that the UN designated terrorist Hafiz Saeed has a free run and sets up candidates for office? We have noticed effort by Pakistan to champion human rights. This is verbal...[a] Princeton professor...[appointed to a national committee in the country has his] removal on [the] grounds he belongs to a minority. Before preaching to the world, preaching human rights should begin at home...Mister president, the new foreign minister of Pakistan chose to term the gruesome killings of our [security personnel]...on flimsy grounds. [In India] every life counts...To conclude, mister president, what we have heard is fake...Pakistan must demonstrate it has moved beyond deceit and distortion."

Speaking in Arabic in response to Qatar, the United Arab Emirates "wish[ed] to exercise [our] Right to Reply on the allegations and false representations of Qatar. It is deplorable Qatar, as usual, adopted political maneuvers to exacerbate [tense relations]...instead of focusing on illegal attitudes which should be redressed...Qatar international[ises] dimensions to the crisis by [falsifying] discussion[s] on [the] legal measures taken by the U.A.E. in co-operation with Bahrain, Kingdom of Saudi Arabia and Egypt against Qatar. Qatar is trying to disseminate false notions taken by our countries. [It has had] destabilising attitudes for decades. Qatar interfered in other Arab states and promotes [extremist] ideologies...[it] finance terrorist groups...[in] flagrant violations of international law [and] multilateral agreements. [It is] also [a] severe threat to our countries and others around the world. The measures we took are targeted measures against the illegal measures by the Qatari regime. The U.A.E. fully respects the people of Qatar. In this vein, the U.A.E. ha[s] implemented measures for most of the people of Qatar not to be affected by these measures against the regime. Therefore the allegations made by Qatar [are false]."

Bahrain also responded with a similar rebuttal as the U.A.E. while adding the "maritime and air corridor is open. So [this] contradicts [the statements of Qatar]. [An] emergency air corridor for passengers [is also open]...Qatar must [adhere to the] Riyadh declaration in 2014 and supplementary [conventions] in 2014."

Pakistan responded to India's reply in calling it a "diatribe" and a "homily [by a] pontiff" while comparing it to the RSS. He then called upon examples of human rights violations in Kashmir by Indian security personnel such as tying a man to a car and using him as human shield against stone throwers and running a person over by a Jeep. He continued in saying India is a country "where unabashed Hindu Yogi Adityanath serves as chief minister of Uttar Pradesh…[where] in Assam migrants are called 'termites'...[where] liberal India today has no room for dissent...[India] continues to face over 70 domestic insurgencies. As for Jammu and Kashmir, I would urge the representative to look beyond obfuscation and denial to answer simple questions...Kashmir is [an] international dispute by the numbers of [UN] resolutions, can India deny [not] using a plebiscite for [the] wishes of [the] Kashmir[I people]? Can India deny killings in Kashmir [which are] well document by international [media and organisations]?...Can India deny using indiscriminate?...The true face of India in Kashmir shown again...speaks of a litany of human rights [violations]…[It is better for the] truth by facing up to it. The truth is Jammu and Kashmir is not a part of India. [It] never was and never will be. [This reality has] no expire date...mister president, India can hide behind semantics, [it] can regurgitate [comments] against Pakistan but [it] cannot hide... [it] can hide voices but [it can]not suppress [what the] international community [has] articulated by human rights commissions. The dead of Jammu and Kashmir tell of a different face. [It is] time for India to abandon double speak...Phony bravado can win an election but not credibility."

Qatar used its second reply (in Arabic) in saying that what has been "heard from the U.A.E. and Bahrain are baseless [and sought] to distort the image of Qatar and aim to undermine Qatar's international relations...[Our] response since [the blockade has been one of a] period [of] dialogue...[We have been] empowering youth and women and other initiatives...[So as not to] impede efforts by the international community, therefore [we have] exercise[d] self restraint...The U.A.E. and Bahrain continue to destabilise and violate human rights. [Their] delegations fail[ed] to produce evidence despite calls [to do so]. This proves the allegations are baseless and the measures taken are [an] embodiment of their failures to adapt to opinion. [It also] proves [the] approach is one of force. Mister chairman, [it has] become eviden[t] that attempts by the regimes in Abu Dhabi and Bahrain against my country are evidence of policies seek[ing] to justify unilateral measures that included digital piracy that have targeted credible entities and represent flagrant violations of international law and to combat cyber crime. Mister chairman, since I cannot ask for the floor again to respond to further statements, my state reserves the right to respond in writing and [have it] placed on record."

The U.A.E. used its second reply in saying (in Arabic): "Mister president, [I am] obliged to respond to allegations of the representative of Qatar...We said multiple times allegations linked to piracy and false announcements by Qatar are complete[ly] erroneous allegations. All four countries refused to participate [in the] plot of digital piracy. [We] all on the regime of Qatar to stray attention from the issue we are focusing [on] and to stop supporting terrorism in the world. Qatar spreads false allegations that piracy led to the diplomatic crisis as if no other actions [were] contributing to this crisis. The region is in a phase of unprecedented turbulence and Qatar is trying to make [the] most of [the] instability by promoting terrorism. We have already clarified what we did with the Kingdom of Bahrain and Egypt. We have discussed [the] reality of the crisis with Qatar. [We] wish to reaffirm that the U.A.E. is playing a role which we are all aware of even if Qatar pays no attention to it. We are the forefront of the clashes the region faces, including by the attitude of Qatar."

=== 1 October ===
Morning session

- Belarus – Foreign Minister Vladimir Makei
- Sudan – Foreign Minister Eldirdiri Mohamed Ahmed
- Timor-Leste – (Scheduled)
- Nicaragua – Foreign Minister Denis Rolando Moncada Colindres
- Holy See – Secretary of Relations with Other States Archbishop Paul Richard Gallagher
- Thailand – Vice Minister of Foreign Affairs Virasakdi Futrakul
- Tajikistan – Permanent Representative Mahmadamin Mahmadaminov
- Uzbekistan – Permanent Representative Bakhtiyor Ibragimov
- Gabon – Permanent Representative Michel Xavier Biang
- Sweden – Permanent Representative Olof Skoog
- Gabon – (Scheduled)
- Canada – Permanent Representative Marc-André Blanchard
- Benin – Permanent Representative Jean-Claude Felix Do Rego
- Timor-Leste – Permanent Representative Maria Helena Pires
- Maldives – Permanent Representative Nasser Mohamed
- Canada -(Scheduled)

==== Closing remarks ====
73rd Session of the United Nations General Assembly President María Fernanda Espinosa ended the General Debate, by speaking from her seat, in summation of the collective points brought up by the representatives who spoke.

== See also ==
- List of UN General Assembly sessions
- List of General debates of the United Nations General Assembly
