= Omar Al Saqqaf =

Saudi Arabian diplomat and politician (1923–1974)

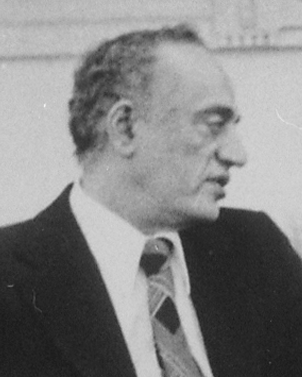
- Al Saqqaf in 1974

Minister of State for Foreign Affairs
- In office 1 April 1968 – 14 November 1974
- Prime Minister: King Faisal
- Preceded by: Office established
- Succeeded by: Saud bin Faisal Al Saud

Personal details
- Born: Omar bin Abbas Al Saqqaf; 1923 Medina, Kingdom of Hejaz
- Died: 14 November 1974 (aged 51) New York City, USA
- Resting place: Jeddah, Saudi Arabia
- Children: 3
- Education: American University of Beirut

Omar Al Saqqaf (Arabic: عمر السقاف, Hejazi Arabic pronunciation: [ʕʊmar assaggaːf]; 1923 – 14 November 1974) was a Saudi diplomat and politician who served as Saudi Arabia's first minister of state for foreign affairs from 1968 until his death. He was among the leading officials of Saudi Arabia in foreign relations and one of the trusted envoys of King Faisal.

== Biography ==
Ancestry

Omar bin Abbas bin Alawi bin Abdul Rahim bin Salem bin Abdul Qader bin Abdullah bin Omar bin Aqeel bin Zain bin Aqeel bin Salem bin Abdullah bin Abdul Rahman bin Abdullah bin Abdul Rahman Al-Saqqaf bin Muhammad Mullah Al-Duwaila bin Ali bin Alawi AlGhayour bin Al-Faqih Al- Muqaddam Muhammad bin Ali bin Muhammad Sahib Murbat bin Ali Khali’ Qassim bin Al-Alawi bin Muhammad bin Alawi bin Obaid Allah bin Ahmed Al-Muhajar bin Isa bin Muhammad Al-Naqib bin Ali Al-Aridi bin Jafar Al-Sadiq bin Muhammad Al-Baqir bin Ali Al- Aridhi bin Al-Hussein Al-Sibt bin Imam Ali bin Abi Talib, and Imam Ali is the husband of Fatima bint Muhammad, may God bless him and grant him peace.

He is the 35th grandson of the Messenger of Allah Muhammad, may Allah's peace and blessings be upon him

=== Early life and education ===
Al Saqqaf was born in Medina in 1923. His grandfather, Sayyid Omar Al Saqqaf, was a merchant in Jeddah dealing with the pilgrim trade. He received a degree in political science from the American University of Beirut.

=== Career and activities ===
Following his graduation Al Saqqaf started his career at the Foreign Office of Saudi Arabia as the third secretary in 1948. From 1951 he assumed the post of acting charge d'affairs with the rank of counselor in different cities, including Karachi, Rome, Jakarta and London. He became chief of protocol at the Ministry of Foreign Affairs in 1956 and then, was named as the acting assistant undersecretary at the ministry. The next year, he was named as the Saudi ambassador to Ethiopia; after serving in the post for one year, he was appointed deputy minister of foreign affairs. He then served as the undersecretary at the Ministry of Foreign Affairs.

Al Saqqaf was named as the state minister for foreign affairs in April 1968. In this capacity he led a group of Saudi officials before the Arab League summit in 1969, and they met with the officials from the Arab countries involved in the Six-Day War in 1967 to inform them that Saudi Arabia would not provide them more financial aid.

Following the Black September events which led to the departure of the Palestinians from Jordan, he headed the Saudi Arabian mission to settle the disputes between Jordan and the Palestinian groups. However, the two sides could not settle; as a result, Al Saqqaf claimed that if Jordanians would remain uncooperative, Saudi Arabia would close its borders with Jordan and suspend its annual financial support. He also added that if the Palestinian groups would not attempt to solve the problems with Jordan, Saudi Arabia would terminate its financial support to them.

Al Saqqaf was one of the active Saudi Arabian officials during the establishment of the Gulf states as independent countries in 1971. Throughout his career, he was among the close advisors to King Faisal. During the oil crisis in 1973 both Prince Fahd, later King Fahd, and Prince Sultan, minister of defense, claimed that Al Saqqaf and oil minister Ahmed Zaki Yamani took an anti-American stance, and were the major reasons for King Faisal's hostile approach towards the USA.

Al Saqqaf's term ended in November 1974 when he died, and he was succeeded by Prince Saud bin Faisal Al Saud in the post in March 1975. In the period between November 1974 and March 1975 the ministry was headed by the acting minister Mohammed Ibrahim Massoud.

=== Personal life and death ===
Al Saqqaf was married and had three children. He had a good command of the English and French languages.

Al Saqqaf was attending the United Nations General Assembly on the Palestine issue in New York City when he died of a cerebral thrombosis at the Waldorf Astoria Hotel on 14 November 1974, at the age of 51. His body was brought back to Jeddah for burial.

== Orders and awards ==
- (Spain) Grand Cross of the Order of Civil Merit (15 February 1974)
- (Egypt) Nile Sash (30 July 1974)
