= Permanent Representative of the Maldives to the United Nations =

Person who represents the Maldives to the United Nations

Permanent Representative of the Republic of Maldives to the United Nations
- Emblem of the Maldives

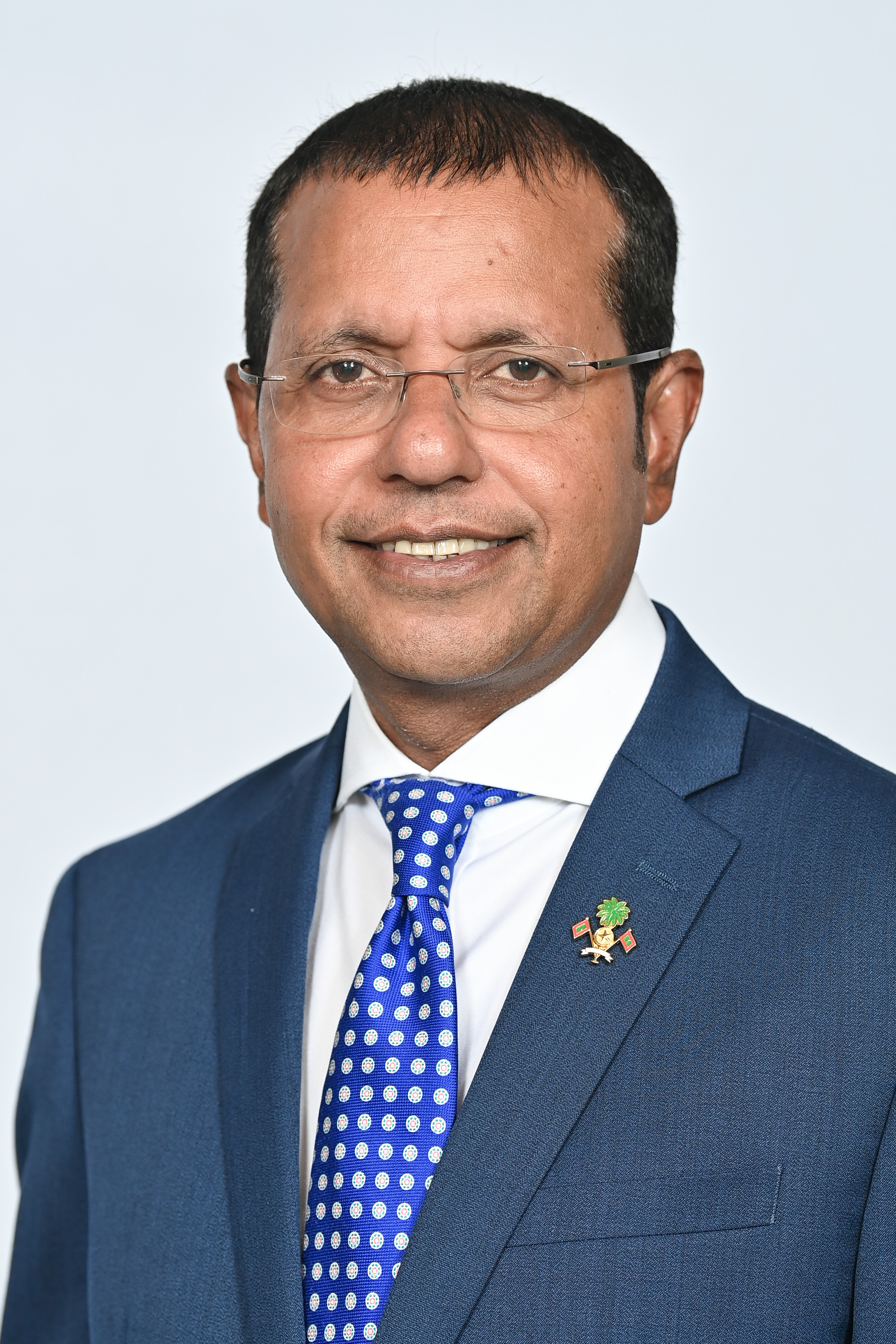
- Incumbent; Ali Naseer Mohamed since 7 May 2024
- Style: His Excellency (formal)
- Appointer: President of the Maldives
- Term length: At the pleasure of the president
- Formation: 12 October 1965; 60 years ago
- First holder: Ahmed Hilmy Didi
- Website: maldivesmission.com

The permanent representative of Maldives to the United Nations is the leader of the Maldives' diplomatic mission to the United Nations. (Note: For a limited time, the Maldives had an embassy in Washington, D.C. It has an American Center in Malé.) It was customary that the permanent representative also be dually accredited as an ambassador to the United States of America. Since May 2024, the incumbent is Ali Naseer Mohamed.

== List of permanent representatives ==
These are the list of permanent representatives:

#	Name	Image	Years served	U.N. Secretary(ies)-General	President of the Maldives
1	Ahmed Hilmy Didi (Note: On November 9, 1965, a diplomatic agreement was granted, but never arrived in Washington.)		1965–1966	U Thant	Ibrahim Nasir
2	Abdul Sattar Moosa Didi		1967–1970	U Thant	Ibrahim Nasir
3	Maumoon Abdul Gayoom		1976–1977	Kurt Waldheim	Ibrahim Nasir
4	Fathulla Jameel		1977–1978	Kurt Waldheim	Ibrahim Nasir
5	Ahmed Zaki		1979–1983	Kurt Waldheim, Javier Pérez de Cuéllar	Maumoon Abdul Gayoom
6	Mohamed Musthafa Hussain		1984–1987	Javier Pérez de Cuéllar	Maumoon Abdul Gayoom
7	Hussain Manikfan		1988–1991	Javier Pérez de Cuéllar	Maumoon Abdul Gayoom
8	Ahmed Zaki		1993–1996	Boutros Boutros-Ghali	Maumoon Abdul Gayoom
9	Hussain Shihab		1998–2002	Kofi Annan	Maumoon Abdul Gayoom
10	Mohamed Latheef (Note: Beginning February 14, 2003, the embassy operated from the U.S. Mission to the United Nations in New York City.)		2002–2007	Kofi Annan, Ban Ki-moon	Maumoon Abdul Gayoom
11	Ahmed Khaleel		2007–2008	Ban Ki-moon	Maumoon Abdul Gayoom
12	Abdul Ghafoor Mohamed		2009–2012	Ban Ki-moon	Mohamed Nasheed
13	Ahmed Sareer		2012–2017	Ban Ki-moon, António Guterres	Mohamed Waheed Hassan, Abdulla Yameen
14	Ali Naseer Mohamed		2017–2019	António Guterres	Abdulla Yameen
15	Thilmeeza Hussain		2019–2023	António Guterres	Ibrahim Mohamed Solih
16	Ali Naseer Mohamed		2024-	António Guterres	Mohamed Muizzu

== See also ==
- Chief of protocol
