= Thilmeeza Hussain =

Maldivian diplomat (born 1978)

Her Excellency Thilmeeza Hussain
- ތިލްމީޛާ ޙުސައިން
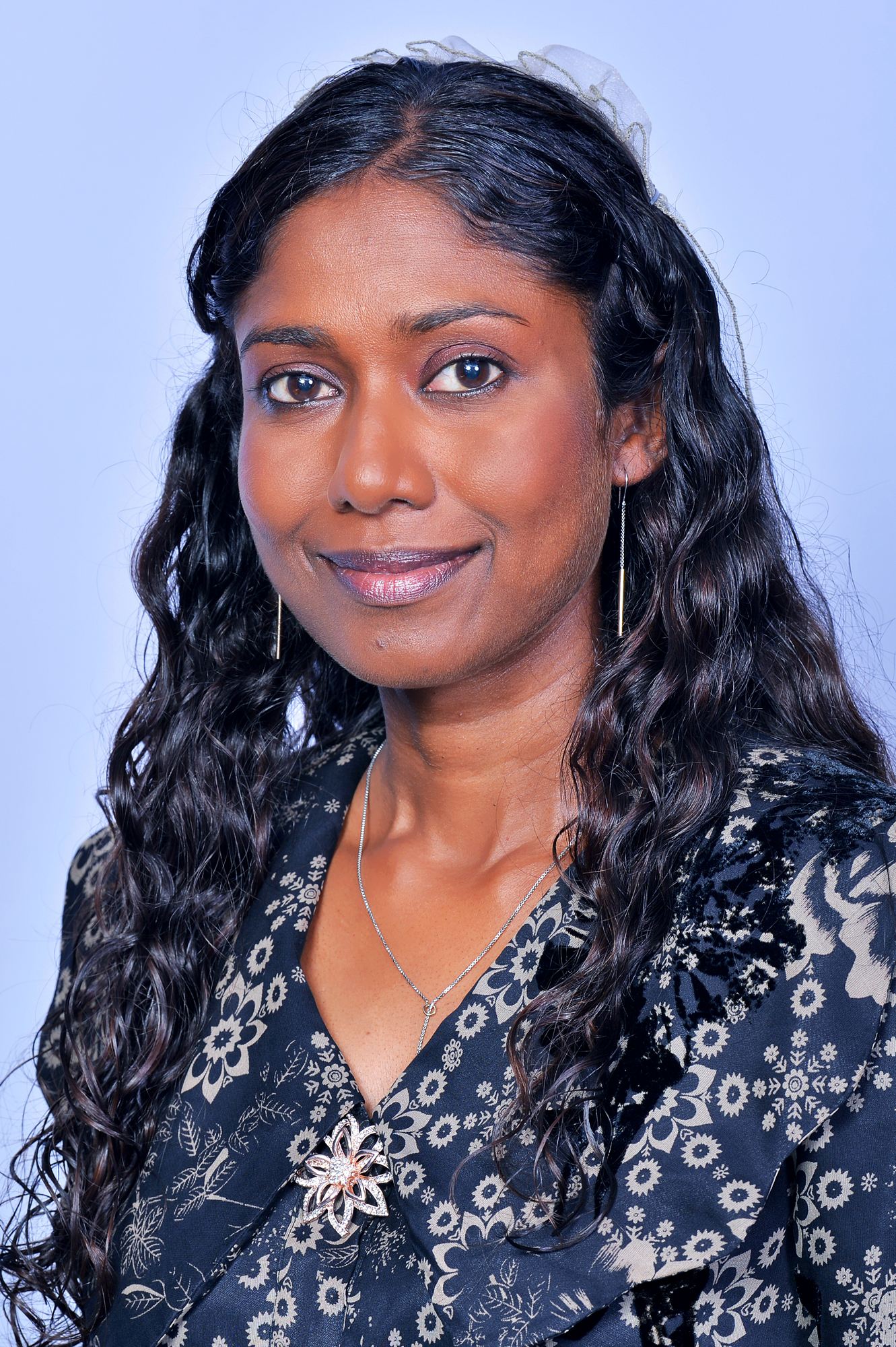

Permanent Representative of the Maldives to the United Nations
- In office 7 May 2019 – 17 November 2023
- President: Ibrahim Mohamed Solih
- Preceded by: Ali Naseer Mohamed
- Succeeded by: Ali Naseer Mohamed

Maldivian High Commissioner to Canada
- In office 12 February 2020 – 17 November 2023
- President: Ibrahim Mohamed Solih

Maldivian Ambassador to the United States
- In office 2019 – August 2022
- President: Ibrahim Mohamed Solih
- Succeeded by: Abdul Ghafoor Mohamed

Personal details
- Born: 22 March 1978 (age 48) Hithaadhoo (Baa Atoll), Maldives
- Parent: Sheikh Hussain Yoosuf (father)
- Education: Colorado Technical University; Murdoch University

Thilmeeza Hussain (Dhivehi: ތިލްމީޛާ ޙުސައިން; born 22 March 1978) is a Maldivian civil servant and diplomat who served as the Permanent Representative of the Maldives to the United Nations and the Maldivian High Commissioner of Maldives to Canada.

== Family ==
She is the daughter of Sheikh Hussain Yoosuf (Native of Hithaadhoo) and the sister of Hisaan Hussain (Former MP of Thulhaadhoo)

== Career ==
In February 2009, she was appointed as State Minister for Home Affairs for the North Province by President Mohamed Nasheed. In November 2009, she was appointed Deputy Permanent Representative to the United Nations, serving until March 2012.

Hussain was appointed by President Ibrahim Solih to serve as the next ambassador to the UN in 2018, succeeding Ali Naseer Mohamed. The appointment was confirmed by the Parliament of the Maldives in December. She presented her credentials as ambassador to Sean Lawler, Chief of Protocol of the Department of State, on 7 May 2019.

Between her time in public office, Hussain served as an adjunct professor at the Ramapo College of New Jersey, the co-founder of the Voice of Women (a Maldivian NGO focusing on women's empowerment, human rights and climate change), and co-chair of the Socially and Economically Just Adaptation and Mitigation Team of the U.S. Climate Action Network.

Hussain holds a Master of Science in Business Management from the Colorado Technical University and a Bachelors of Commerce from Murdoch University.
