= Ministry of Foreign Affairs (Saudi Arabia) =

Government ministry of Saudi Arabia

- وزارة الخارجية

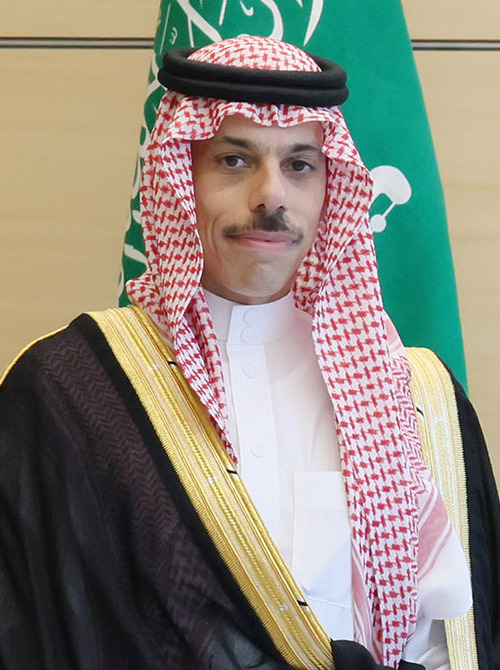
- Faisal bin Farhan, the current Minister of Foreign Affairs since 23 October 2019

Agency overview
- Formed: 19 December 1930; 95 years ago
- Preceding agency: Directorate General for Foreign Affairs (1926–1930)
- Jurisdiction: Government of Saudi Arabia
- Headquarters: Riyadh
- Minister responsible: Faisal bin Farhan
- Child agency: Prince Saud Al-Faisal Institute of Diplomatic Studies
- Website: Official English Site

The Ministry of Foreign Affairs (Arabic: وزارة الخارجية) is a government ministry in Saudi Arabia responsible for managing the Kingdom’s foreign policy and international relations. It oversees the diplomatic, political, cultural, and economic relations with other countries and international organizations.

== History ==
During the consolidation of the newly formed Kingdom of Hejaz and Nejd, King Abdulaziz established foreign diplomatic relations by sending representatives abroad. A branch of the Directorate of Foreign Affairs was also opened in Jeddah. The first Director General of Foreign Affairs was Abdullah Al-Damluji, who also served as ruler of the Hejaz at the time.

In 1930, a royal decree elevated the Directorate General of Foreign Affairs to the Ministry of Foreign Affairs. King Abdulaziz appointed his son, Prince Faisal, who later became King and prime minister Faisal, as the first foreign minister. The Kingdom of Saudi Arabia was formally established in 1932.

Initially, the ministry consisted of five departments: the private office and the departments of oriental affairs, administrative affairs, political affairs, and consular affairs. The ministry subsequently began establishing diplomatic missions abroad. The first mission was opened in Cairo in 1926, followed by another in London in 1930. The number of missions increased from five in 1936 to 18 in 1951 and continued to expand thereafter.

Prince Faisal continued to serve as foreign minister after ascending the throne as King. Following his assassination in 1975, he was succeeded as foreign minister by his son, Saud Al-Faisal. Prince Saud was the longest-serving foreign minister of any country in modern times.

The ministry launched its magazine, The Diplomat, in 2007. In 2010, it was reported that Turki Al-Faisal was expected to succeed Saud Al-Faisal upon his retirement; however, this did not occur.

== Senior officials ==
The senior officials in the ministry are as follows:

Official	Rank
Faisal bin Farhan	Minister of Foreign Affairs
Waleed A. Elkhereiji	Deputy Minister of Foreign Affairs
Sara Al-Sayyid	Deputy Minister of Foreign Affairs for Public Diplomacy
Adel al-Jubeir	Minister of State for Foreign Affairs

== List of ministers ==
No.	Portrait	Minister	Took office	Left office	Time in office
1		Faisal bin Abdulaziz	19 December 1930	22 December 1960	30 years, 3 days
2		Ibrahim Al-Suweil	22 December 1960	16 March 1962	1 year, 84 days
3		Faisal bin Abdulaziz	16 March 1962	25 March 1975	13 years, 9 days
4		Saud Al-Faisal	13 October 1975	29 April 2015	39 years, 198 days
5		Adel al-Jubeir	29 April 2015	27 December 2018	3 years, 242 days
6		Ibrahim Al-Assaf	27 December 2018	23 October 2019	300 days
7		Faisal bin Farhan	23 October 2019	Incumbent	6 years, 289 days

== List of ministers of state for foreign affairs ==
No.	Portrait	Minister	Took office	Left office	Time in office
1		Omar Al-Saqqaf	1 April 1968	14 November 1974	6 years, 227 days
2		Mohammad Ibrahim Massoud	14 November 1974	29 March 1975	135 days
3		Saud Al-Faisal	29 March 1975	13 October 1975	198 days
Vacant (14 October 1975 – 28 August 2005)
4		Nizar Madani	29 August 2005	27 December 2018	13 years, 120 days
5		Adel al-Jubeir	27 December 2018	Incumbent	7 years, 224 days

== Building ==
The building of the ministry is in Riyadh and was designed by Henning Larsen. It blends both vernacular and monumental styles of Islamic architecture. Larsen received the Aga Khan Award for Architecture in 1989 for his work on the building.

Built in 1984, the building consists of meeting, conference and prayer rooms, a library and a banquet hall. Externally, the building appears as a fortress that was carved out of a single piece of stone.

== See also ==
- Politics of Saudi Arabia
- Ministries of Saudi Arabia
- Foreign relations of Saudi Arabia
