= Ali Naseer Mohamed =

Maldivian diplomat (born 1969)

- ޢަލީ ނަޞީރު މުޙައްމަދު
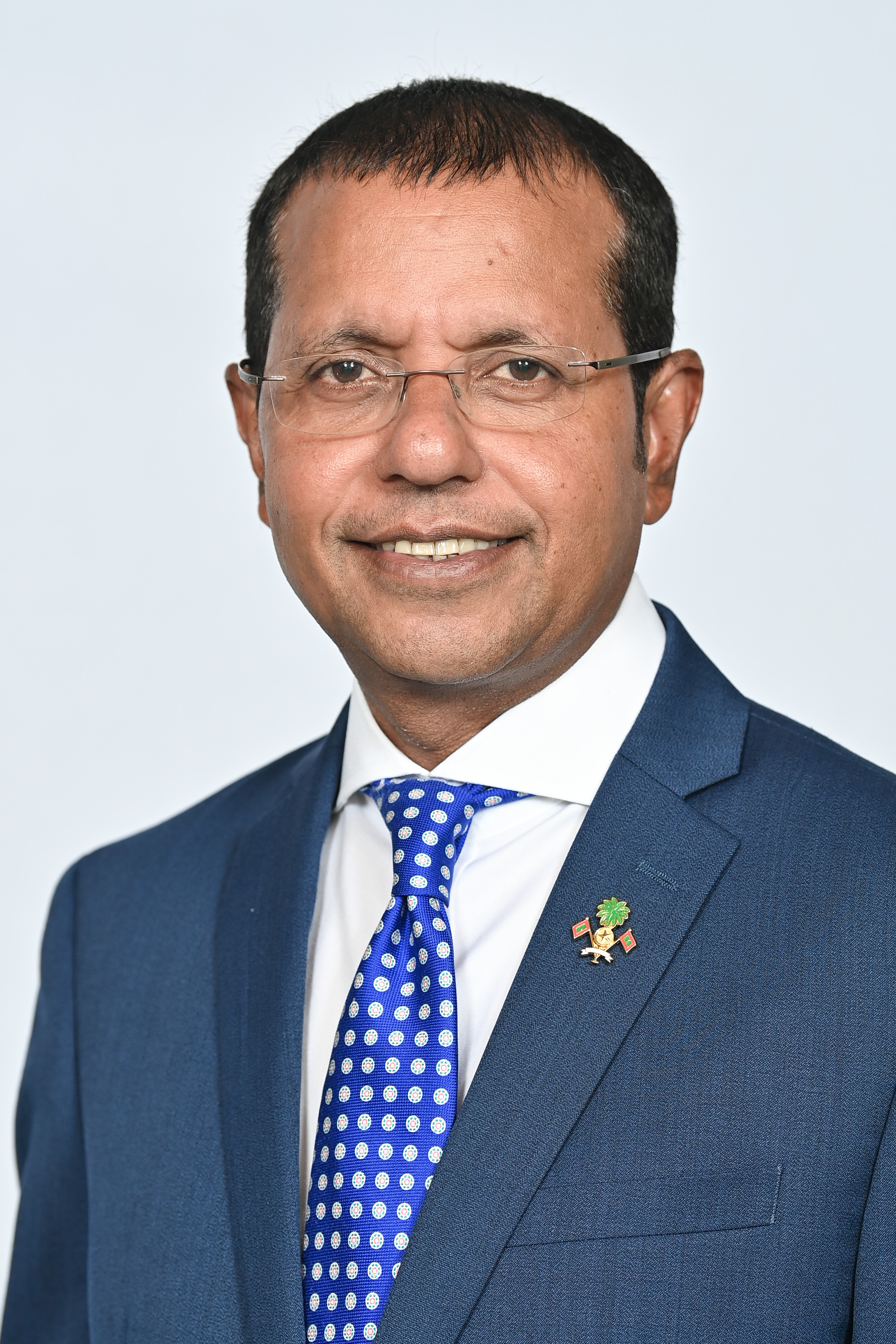
- Official portrait, 2024

Permanent Representative of the Maldives to the United Nations
- Incumbent
- Assumed office 7 May 2024
- Appointed by: Mohamed Muizzu
- Preceded by: Thilmeeza Hussain
- In office 9 July 2017 – 7 May 2019
- Appointed by: Abdulla Yameen
- Preceded by: Ahmed Sareer
- Succeeded by: Thilmeeza Hussain

Personal details
- Born: 2 November 1969 (age 57) Gadhdhoo, Gaafu Dhaalu Atoll, Maldives
- Spouse: Azeema Adam
- Children: 2
- Education: Australian National University (PhD); University of Leicester (Master's)

Ali Naseer Mohamed (Dhivehi: ޢަލީ ނަޞީރު މުޙައްމަދު, born 2 November 1969) is a Maldivian diplomat who is currently serving as the Permanent Representative of the Maldives to the United Nations and was previously the Ambassador of the Maldives to the United States and Canada from July 2017 to May 2019.

== Education ==
A native of Gadhdhoo, Gaafu Dhaalu Atoll, Naseer received a PhD in diplomatic studies from the Australian National University, and a master's degree in diplomatic studies from the University of Leicester.

== Career ==
He joined the Maldives Foreign Service in May 1985 and served in a number of posts within the Foreign Ministry, including additional secretary of the Policy Planning Division, director general of the Foreign Relations Directorate, director general of the Department for External Resources, and assistant director of the Research Division. He was the lead figure tasked with coordinating international relief aid in the aftermath of the 2004 Indian Ocean earthquake and tsunami in the Maldives. From November 2013 to July 2017 he was foreign secretary in the Ministry of Foreign Affairs.

On 9 July 2017 he was appointed by President Abdulla Yameen as ambassador and permanent representative, succeeding Ahmed Sareer, who replaced him as foreign secretary. He took office as Permanent Representative to the United Nations on 17 July 2017 and presented his credentials to U.S. President Donald Trump on 21 July 2017. He was succeeded by Thilmeeza Hussain in May 2019.

On 18 November 2023, he was appointed by Maldivian President Mohamed Muizzu as an Ambassador-at-large.

On 7 May 2024, Naseer was appointed as the Permanent Representative of the Maldives to the United Nations and he presented his letter of credence to the Secretary-General of the United Nations António Guterres.

== Family ==
Naseer is married to Azeema Adam, a former governor of the Maldives Monetary Authority who resigned in 2017. They have a daughter and a son.
