= Maldives–Saudi Arabia relations =

Bilateral relations

- Maldives: Saudi Arabia

Maldives–Saudi Arabia Relations are the bilateral relations between Saudi Arabia and Maldives.

== History ==
Diplomatic relations between Saudi Arabia and the Maldives were established on 17 March 1981 during the presidency of former Maldivian President Maumoon Abdul Gayoom, who ruled the country for three decades until 2008. These relations increased between the two countries after a visit by Saudi King Salman bin Abdulaziz, when he was Crown Prince at the time, in the month of February 2014 to the Republic of Maldives. King Salman donated the construction of 10 mosques in the Maldives.

== Diplomatic missions ==
Maldives opened an embassy in Riyadh on 12 May 2008. The current ambassador to the Kingdom of Saudi Arabia is Ahmed Sareer.

Saudi Arabia established an embassy in Malé on 2 August 2015. The current ambassador to the Republic of Maldives is Matrek Abdullah Al-Ajalin Aldosari.
