= Ahmed Sareer =

Maldivian diplomat (born 1965)

His Excellency Ahmed Sareer
- Official portrait, 2024

Ambassador of the Maldives to Saudi Arabia
- Incumbent
- Assumed office 10 November 2024
- President: Mohamed Muizzu
- Preceded by: Mohamed Khaleel

Ambassador of the Maldives to the United States
- In office 14 January 2013 – 9 July 2017
- President: Abdulla Yameen
- Succeeded by: Ali Naseer Mohamed

Permanent Representative of the Maldives to the United Nations
- In office 20 December 2012 – 9 July 2017
- President: Mohamed Waheed Hassan; Abdulla Yameen
- Preceded by: Abdul Ghafoor Mohamed
- Succeeded by: Ali Naseer Mohamed

High Commissioner of the Maldives to Bangladesh
- In office 1 December 2009 – 12 February 2012
- President: Mohamed Nasheed; Mohamed Waheed Hassan
- Preceded by: Abdul Samad Abdulla
- Succeeded by: Mohamed Asim

Personal details
- Born: 28 August 1965 (age 61) Malé, Maldive Islands
- Children: 4
- Education: University of Canberra (BSS); Monash University (MFA)

Ahmed Sareer (born 28 August 1965) is a Maldivian diplomat who is presently serving as Maldives Ambassador to the Kingdom of Saudi Arabia since 10 November 2024. Previously he served as Permanent Representative of the Maldives to the United Nations from 2012 to 2017.

== Early life and education ==
Ahmed Sareer was born on 28 August 1965 in Malé, Maldives. He has a Master of Arts degree in foreign affairs and trade from Monash University. He attained his Bachelor of Arts degree on Social Sciences from University of Canberra.

== Career ==
He first joined the Maldivian Foreign Ministry in February 1986, as a Desk Officer. Later he served as Third Secretary in a diplomatic posting in Colombo, Sri Lanka for a year (1988–1989), before returning to work at the Ministry, rising to the position of Assistant Under-Secretary in 1992. He was then appointed chargé d’affaires at the Maldives' Permanent Mission to the United Nations, serving from 1992 to 1993. Returning to the Maldives, he eventually became deputy director for Foreign Relations in the Ministry of Foreign Affairs. From 2000 to 2003, he was Director at the Secretariat of the South Asian Association for Regional Cooperation in Kathmandu, Nepal.

Having risen in the ranks of the Foreign Ministry, he subsequently served as Deputy High Commissioner for the Maldives in Sri Lanka, chargé d'affaires at the Maldivian mission to the European Union (2008), Deputy High Commissioner to the United Kingdom (2008–2009). From 2009 to 2012, he was High Commissioner to Bangladesh; in February 2012, he became Ambassador to the United States, having presented credentials to Barack Obama. On 20 December 2012, he presented his credentials to United Nations Secretary-General Ban Ki-moon, as the Maldives Permanent Representative to the United Nations. As chairman of the Alliance of Small Island States from 2015 to 2017, he was a key figure in negotiating the Paris Agreement and for adopting the target of limiting temperature increase to 1.5 °C. His tenure as Permanent Representative ended on 5 July 2017.

On 18 July 2017 he was appointed Foreign Secretary in the Ministry of Foreign Affairs, and served in that capacity till 31 October 2018. He then moved to take up a posting at the General Secretariat of the Organization of the Islamic Conference since 1 November 2018, first as Advisor to the Secretary General and later as Director of Asian Affairs. During this period, he also served as Head of Peace, Security and Conflict Resolution Unit at OIC General Secretariat.

On 15 October 2024, President Mohamed Muizzu nominated Sareer as the Ambassador of the Maldives to Saudi Arabia. This was later approved by the People's Majlis, which Muizzu officially appointed him to that role on 30 October 2024.

On 13 October 2026, it was reported by Adhadhu, that Sareer was going to be dismissed by the Maldivian government following his refusal to join the ruling People's National Congress party.
