= Nizar Madani =

Diplomat who served as the state minster for foreign affairs of Saudi Arabia

His Excellency Nizar Madani
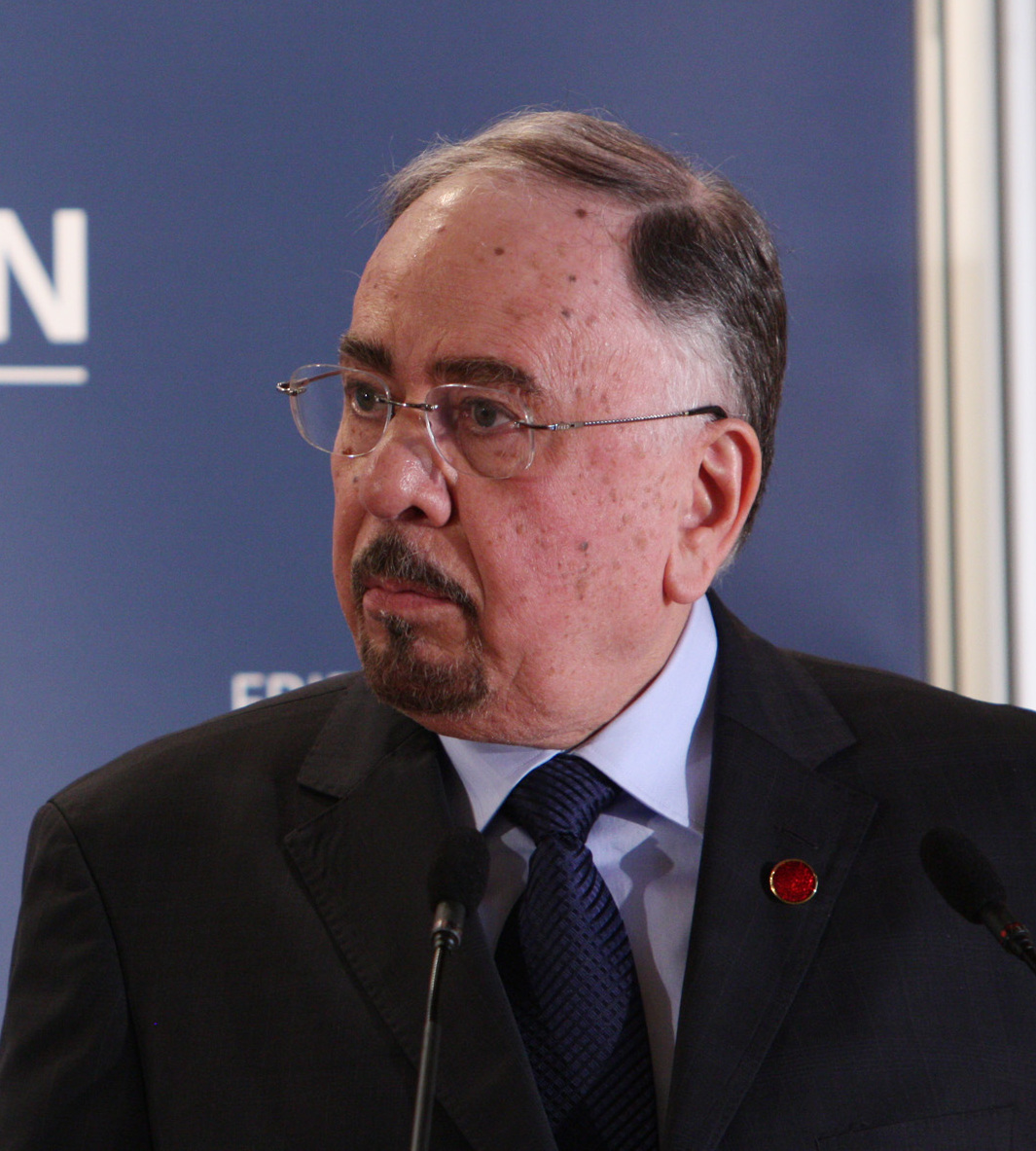

Minister of State for Foreign Affairs
- In office 29 August 2005 – 29 December 2018
- Monarchs: King Abdullah; King Salman
- Preceded by: Position established
- Succeeded by: Adel al-Jubeir

Assistant Minister of Foreign Affairs
- In office 25 November 1997 – 29 August 2005
- Monarchs: King Abdullah; King Fahd

Personal details
- Born: 1941 (age 84–85) Medina, Saudi Arabia
- Education: Cairo University; American University

Nizar bin Obaid Madani (Arabic: نزار بن عبيد مدني; born 1941) is a diplomat who served as the state minister for foreign affairs of the Kingdom of Saudi Arabia.

== Early life and education ==
Madani was born in Madinah in 1941. He obtained a Bachelor of Arts degree in economics and political science from Cairo University in 1964. He earned a master's degree in international relations at American University, Washington, D.C. in 1971. He received a PhD in international relations from the same university in 1977. His thesis is entitled The Islamic Content of the Foreign Policy of Saudi Arabia. King Faisal's Call for Islamic Solidarity 1965-1975.

== Career ==
Madani joined the ministry of foreign affairs as an attaché in 1965 where he then proceeded to the Saudi embassy in Washington in 1968, eventually taking the position of Chargé d'affaires. In 1967, he was appointed director of media affairs. Then he was posted to take charge of international affairs in 1978, and then progressed to become assist manager, office of minister of foreign affairs in 1984. He also participated in several international conferences at the United Nations and in the Arab League. He was appointed in 1993 as a member of the Consultative Council in its first session, and he was then reappointed in 1997. Later, he became assistant foreign minister. He was appointed minister of state for foreign affairs on 29 August 2005.

He is a member of the Okaz publishing company.
