= 2026 in the Maldives =

- Decades: 2000s; 2010s; 2020s
- See also: Other events of 2026; Timeline of Maldivian history

The following is a list of events that will occur in the Maldives in the year 2026, along with scheduled events that are yet to take place.

== Incumbents ==
=== Government ===
- President: Mohamed Muizzu
- Vice President: Hussain Mohamed Latheef
- Majlis speaker: Abdul Raheem Abdulla
- Chief Justice: Abdul Ghanee Mohamed
- Majlis: 20th

== Events ==
=== Eclipses ===
- 3 March – March 2026 Penumbral lunar eclipse – View in Malé.

=== January ===
- 4 January – A constitutional amendment bill is proposed to the People's Majlis to merge parliamentary and presidential elections.
- 5 January – The constitutional amendment bill passes amid a boycott by the Maldivian Democratic Party of extraordinary sittings, calling them "unlawful."
- 26 January: Inauguration of a new school in Hulhumalé Phase 2.

=== February ===
- 3 February – Mohamed Waheed Hassan resigns as Special Envoy of the President due to his connection with Jeffrey Epstein.
- 8 February – The Maldives lifts its travel ban on Syria and drops Hay'at Tahrir al-Sham from the Terror list.
- 27 February – Mauritius breaks diplomatic relations with the Maldives following the Chagos dispute.
- 28 February – President Muizzu establishes a Special Cabinet Committee on Middle East Tensions.

=== April ===
- 3 April – The Bangladesh national under-20 football team wins the SAFF U-20 Championship at the Galolhu Stadium.
- 4 April –
  - 2026 Maldivian local elections
  - 2026 Maldivian constitutional referendum: A majority of voters reject a proposed constitutional amendment that would place presidential and parliamentary elections on the same day in 2028.
- 7 April – Beginning of the 2026 Maldivian protests: The People's National Front staged rallies in Malé demanding the president’s resignation.
- 12 April – The Supreme Court of the Maldives removes Hithadhoo North MP Mohamed Sinan from the People's Majlis over a debt related to a MVR 3.8 million loan from the Maldives Islamic Bank.
- 14 April –
  - Ten cabinet ministers, namely Foreign Minister Abdulla Khaleel, Defence Minister Mohamed Ghassan Maumoon, Health Minister Abdulla Nazim Ibrahim, Family Development Minister Aishath Shiham, Local Government Minister Adam Shareef, Agriculture and Animal Welfare Minister Maryam Mariya, Youth Minister Ibrahim Waheed, Tourism Minister Thoriq Ibrahim, Higher Education Minister Ali Haidar Ahmed and Dhivehi Language Minister Adam Naseer Ibrahim— resign en masse. Four new members of the cabinet are subsequently announced, namely Heena Waleed, Geela Ali, Iruthisham Adam, and Ali Shareef.
  - 2026 Maldivian protests: The opposition Maldivian Democratic Party organizes nightly demonstrations along with 12 demands.
- 18 April – 2026 Maldivian protests: Maldives Police Service detain Vice President of the MDP Youth Wing Ahmed Maimoon Mohamed.
- 21 April – 2026 Maldivian protests: Police injure an individual using a taser gun.
- 27 April – President Mohamed Muizzu denies all allegations about his alleged affair with Aisha.
  - Police raid Adhadhu's office under a court order and seize many electronics.
- 28 April – Maldives Immigration travel bans Adhadhu's CEO Hussain Fiyaz Moosa and Editor Hassan Mohamed in connection with the investigation into the documentary.
- 30 April – Maldives drops 52.46 (104/180) into 49.23 (108/180) in Reporters Without Borders's Press Freedom Index.

=== May ===
- 10 May – The Criminal Court issues a nationwide injunction prohibiting any direct or indirect discussion related to a documentary concerning allegations of an affair involving President Muizzu.
- 11 May –
  - Adhadhu journalist Mohamed Shahzan is removed from the President's Office after raising a question to Muizzu about the documentary, in violation of the gag order.
  - The Elections Commission fines the People's National Front MVR 100,000 for “repeated violations” of the Political Parties Act and the Peaceful Assembly Act (including alleged obstruction of other parties’ events).
- 12 May – Adhadhu journalists Leevan Ali Nasir and Mohamed Shahzan are detained by court.
  - The President's Office bars journalists from Adhadhu from attending future press briefings.
- 13 May – 2026 Maldivian protests: Police detain 10 individuals during a protest that turns violent.
- 14 May – Five Italian nationals die in the 2026 Thinwana Kandu cave diving incident in Vaavu Atoll.
  - 2026 Maldivian protests: A large number of journalists stage street demonstrations in Malé demanding the immediate release of Mohamed Shahzan and Leevan Ali Nasir.
  - An opposition coalition from three former Presidents, Mohamed Nasheed, Abdulla Yameen and Ibrahim Mohamed Solih is formed.
- 16 May — An MNDF diver dies during the search operation for the missing Italian divers.
- 31 May — Ahmed Nazim resigns as the Deputy Speaker of the People's Majlis amid an impeachment motion against him.

=== June ===
- 1 June — Ahmed Saleem (Redwave Saleem) elected as the new Deputy Speaker of the People's Majlis.
- 8 June:
  - Minister of Finance and Public Enterprises Moosa Zameer resigns, citing health reasons.
  - President Mohamed Muizzu appoints Hassan Zareer as the Minister of Finance and Public Enterprises.

=== July ===
- 2 July – The Maldives Financial Expo 2026 opens at Central Park, Hulhumalé, returning after a nine-year hiatus.
- 15 July – President Mohamed Muizzu launches the Youth Entrepreneurship Financing Facility.
- 27 July – President Mohamed Muizzu commissions CGS Imaduddin, an Australian-donated Coast Guard vessel.

=== August ===
- 12 August – The Maldivian Democratic Party (MDP) holds a demonstration in Malé commemorating the anniversary of Black Friday and protesting against inflation and foreign currency shortages.
- 31 August – President Mohamed Muizzu ratifies seven bills, including amendments to the Foreign Currency Act, Goods and Services Tax Act, Income Tax Act and Fisheries Act, as well as the Land Transport Act and the Act on Leasing Uninhabited Islands and Lagoons.

=== September ===
- 7 September – President Mohamed Muizzu announces the National Respect Initiative.
- 8 September – President Mohamed Muizzu asks UK Prime Minister Andy Burnham to reopen Chagos Islands sovereignty talks.
- 15 September – Malaysian Prime Minister Anwar Ibrahim undertakes a state visit to the Maldives, his first visit to the country since becoming Prime Minister in 2022. The two countries exchange memoranda of understanding on defence cooperation and Islamic affairs and agree to begin negotiations on a Preferential Trade Agreement.
- 21 September – Eagle Hills signed a commercial terms agreement with the Maldives government for a new project called the ‘Maldives Waterfront and Marina’ in Rasmalé.

=== October ===
- 21 October – President Mohamed Muizzu undertakes a state visit to Pakistan, coinciding with the 60th anniversary of diplomatic relations between the two countries.
- 24 October – India's Ministry of External Affairs is closely monitoring Maldives-Pakistan Agreements, Warns of Response.
- 27 October – Demonstrations take place in Malé against the proposed Rasmalé development project.
- 31 October – Former President and Spokesperson of Maldivian Democratic Party Mohamed Nasheed openly supports Rasmalé development by Eagle Hills.

=== November ===
- 1 November – British national dies while snorkelling in the Maldives for wedding anniversary.
- 2 November – Former Foreign Minister and Maldivian Democratic Party President Abdulla Shahid arrested under a court warrant which accused him of sexually abusing a minor. He was remanded for thirty days while the investigation is ongoing.
- 11 November – 2026 SAFF Championship : Maldives recorded the worst ever SAFF Championship finish, defeating both Pakistan and India in a group match.
- 13 November:
  - The Trans Maldivian Airways seaplane sinks after float breaks off before takeoff.
  - Opposition parties and supporters hold a demonstration in Malé calling for a referendum on the proposed Rasmalé development project.
- 14 November – President Mohamed Muizzu inaugurates the National Respect Initiative.

== Holidays ==
- 1 January – New Year's Day
- 5 February – Majlis Presidential Address and Opening of the Parliament
- 18 February – Ramadan
- 9 to 22 March – Eid al-Fitr Holiday
- 5 to 6 April – Post-Election & Referendum Government Holiday
- 1 May – Labour Day
- 24 to 30 May — Eid al-Adha Holiday
- 16 June – Islamic New Year
- 26 July – 61st Independence Day
- 27 July — 61st Independence Day holiday
- 14 August – National Day (Qaumee Dhuvas)
- 25 August – Prophet Muhammad's Birthday
- 13 September – The Day Maldives Embraced Islam
- 3 November – Victory Day
- 11-12 November – Republic Day Holiday

== Academic Days ==
- January to March – GCE Ordinary Level Examination for 2025 students
- 24 January – International Day of Education
- 25 January – Teacher's Reporting Day
- 27 January – First day of school in Maldives
- 1 to 8 March – Professional Development Days
- 9 to 22 March – Eid al-Fitr Holiday
- 17 May to 15 June – School Transfer Period 1
- 24 to 30 May – Eid al-Adha Holiday (ie: Mid-term Break)
- 30 June to 9 July – Exam
- 16 July – School break
- 17 July to 1 August – School Break Holiday
- 2 August – Beginning of Second term in Maldives
- 22 to 25 August – Camps and Activities (KS1-KS4)
- 13 to 19 September– Mid-term Break
- 5 October – Teacher's day
- October to November – GCE Ordinary Level & GCE Advanced Level Examination
- 18 October to 17 November – School Transfer Period 2
- 12 November – Professional Development Day
- 1 to 10 December – Final examination
- 17 December – Annual holiday starts
- 18 December 2026 to 16 January 2027 – Annual Holiday

== Sport ==
- 2026 SAFF Futsal Championship
- 2026 SAFF Women's Futsal Championship
- 2026 SAFF U-20 Championship
- 2026 Asian Beach Games
- 2026 FIFA U-15 World Cup & Festival
- 2026 SAFF Championship

== Deaths ==
- 26 February: Ahmed Nimal, 62, actor, film director, and editor.
- 16 May: Mohamed Mahudhee, 43, Staff Sergeant First Class at MNDF.
