= 2026 Maldivian protests =

Series of anti-government protests in the Maldives

- Part of Political unrest in the Maldives and 2025 Maldivian protests
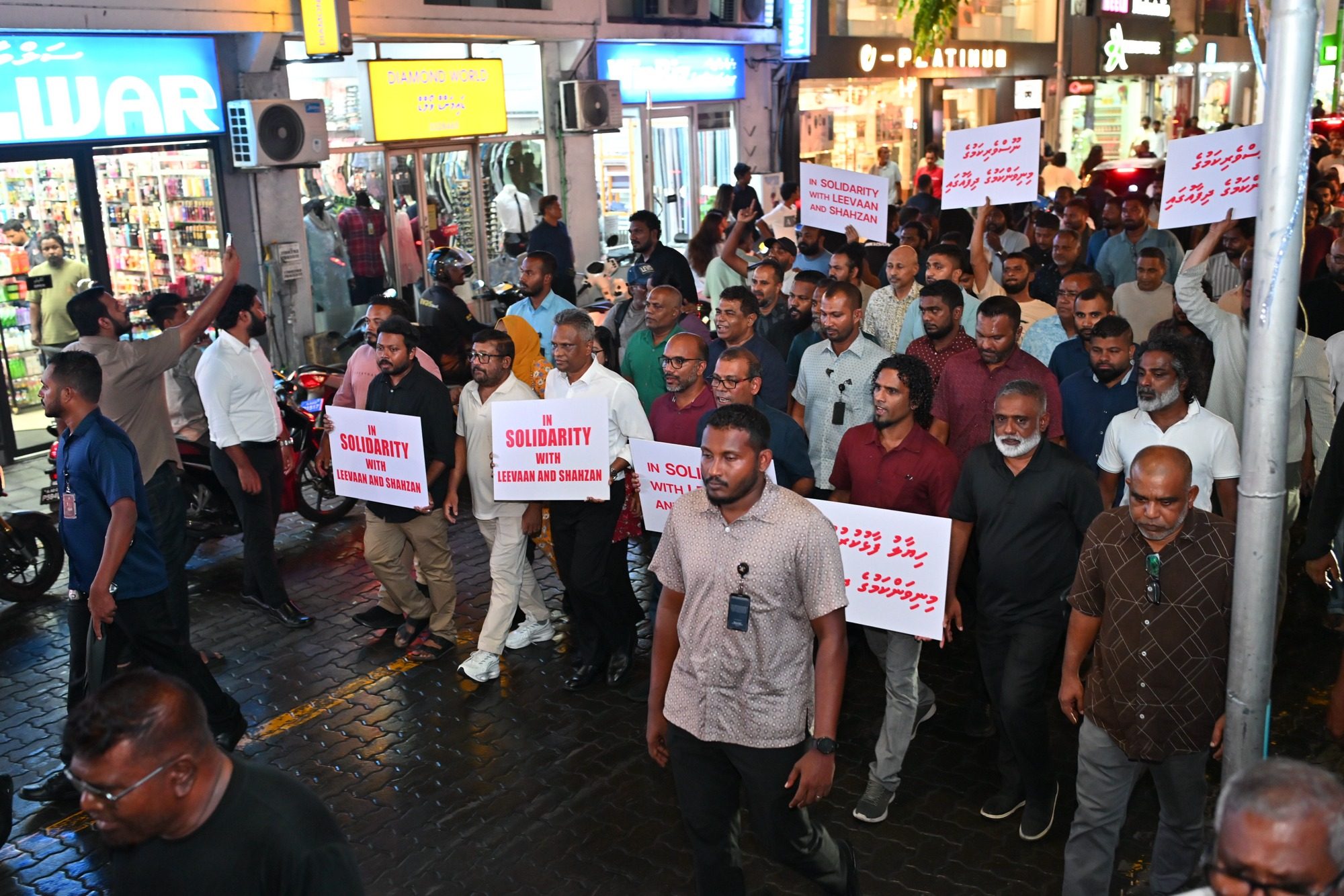
- Protesters in Malé during the demonstrations on 13 May 2026.
- Date: 7 April 2026 – present (4 months and 22 days)
- Location: Malé
- Caused by: Aftermath of the Constitutional referendum; Alleged crackdown on journalists from Adhadhu; Political controversy surrounding President Mohamed Muizzu; Cabinet reshuffles and dismissals
- Goals: Protection of press freedom; Government accountability; Resignation of President Mohamed Muizzu
- Methods: Protests; Demonstrations; Marches
- Status: Ongoing

Parties
Government of the Maldives; Presidency of the Maldives; People's Majlis; People's National Congress; Maldives Police Service; Maldives National Defence Force; Elections Commission of the Maldives	(Maldives) Opposition groups; People's National Front; Maldivian Democratic Party; Adhadhu; Journalists and media activists; Civil society groups; Committee to Protect Journalists

Lead figures
Mohamed Muizzu; Iruthisham Adam; Ali Ihusaan	Abdulla Yameen; Mohamed Nasheed; Ibrahim Mohamed Solih; Opposition activists

Casualties
- Injuries: 3
- Arrested: 20
- Several international press freedom organizations criticized the treatment of journalists during the protests.

The 2026 Maldivian protests were a series of anti-government demonstrations held across the Maldives following the ruling party’s losses in the 2026 Constitutional referendum and amid political controversy surrounding allegations involving President Mohamed Muizzu, the dismissal of cabinet ministers, and the crackdown on journalists from Adhadhu over President's alleged affair. The protests were mainly organized by opposition parties, civil society activists, and youth groups, who accused the government of suppressing press freedom and undermining democratic institutions.

== Background ==
Following the 2026 Maldivian local elections, opposition parties claimed that the government had lost public support despite maintaining state influence over key institutions. Political tensions escalated after reports circulated online alleging an affair involving President Mohamed Muizzu and an individual identified as Aisha. Shortly after the allegations spread, authorities questioned and detained journalists affiliated with Adhadhu, drawing criticism from press freedom advocates.

The controversy intensified after several cabinet reshuffles and dismissals, which opposition figures described as an attempt to contain political fallout. Demonstrators accused the government of intimidation and censorship, while government officials denied wrongdoing and stated that legal investigations were being conducted according to Maldivian law.

A backdrop to the 2026 events was an already-tense civic environment. In late 2025 the Maldives Media and Broadcasting Regulation Act was passed (Sept 2025) over heavy opposition. This “Media Control Act” centralized media oversight under a commission with broad powers (fines, suspensions, content takedowns) Journalists and rights groups protested the law; several were briefly detained by police during an August 2025 rally. In January 2026 the new Media Commission ordered the removal of a political cartoon from Adhadhu News’s website citing it is "Islamophobic" and "Irreligous" (Dhivehi: ލާދީނީ) (the cartoon satirised corruption and was seen as critical of the President) Civicus and UN monitors noted these moves as part of a “draconian” media crackdown: civic space was rated “obstructed” by early 2026.

== Events ==
Within days, former President and current PNF leader Abdulla Yameen called for broad rejection of the Muizzu government. On 7 April, the People's National Front staged rallies in Malé demanding the president’s resignation. PNF leaders argued that the 68% “No” vote demonstrated Muizzu had lost his mandate. They vowed to hold nightly protests, framing it as a movement to find an “other Maldives” opposed to the ruling party.

In the weeks following 4 April, anti-government protests intensified across Malé. The opposition Maldivian Democratic Party (MDP) organized nightly demonstrations, usually held between 21:00 GMT+5 and midnight, accusing President Mohamed Muizzu's administration of democratic backsliding, corruption, and weakening independent institutions.

During the protests, the party submitted a list of 12 reforms which it described as necessary to restore public confidence in the government.

=== MDP's 12 reform demands ===
1. Restore parliamentary authority over appointments to independent institutions.
2. Reverse financial regulation changes alleged to facilitate corruption.
3. Protect the parliamentary independence of members of parliament.
4. Strengthen decentralization and council autonomy.
5. Accelerate investigations into alleged corruption and state spending.
6. Disclose details of political appointments and state recruitment.
7. Reduce fuel costs and provide subsidies for fishermen.
8. Reform the judiciary and the Judicial Service Commission.
9. Replace the heads of the Anti-Corruption Commission and the Elections Commission of Maldives.
10. Address inflation, reduce state expenditure, and improve economic transparency due to ongoing Middle Eastern Conflict.
11. Establish a national reform committee to oversee constitutional amendments.
12. Strengthen environmental protections and review projects lacking proper environmental assessments.

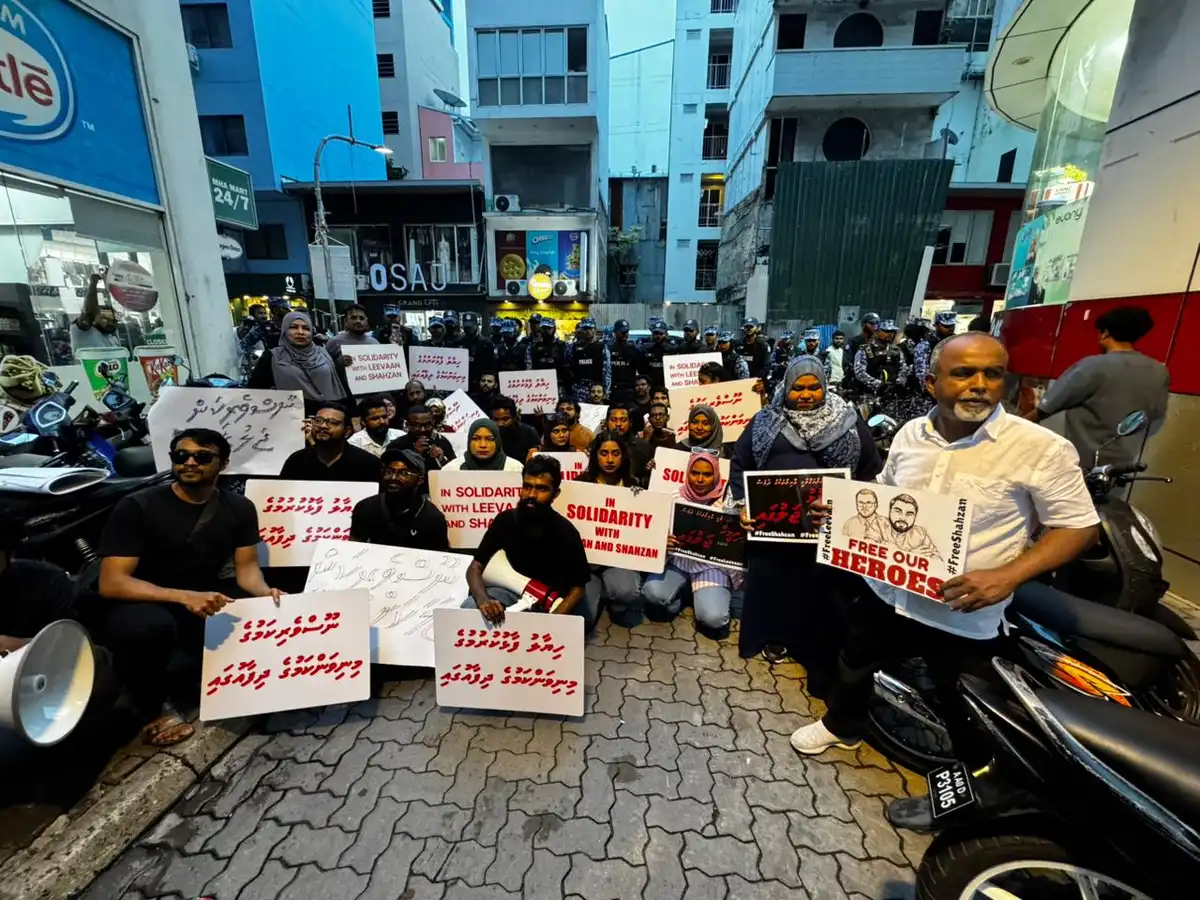
Protesters gather on 15 May 2026 to demand the release of imprisoned journalists.

On 15 May 2026, A large number of journalists took to the streets of Malé to protest and demand the immediate release of Mohamed Shahzan and Leevan Ali Nasir.

=== Forming opposition coalition ===
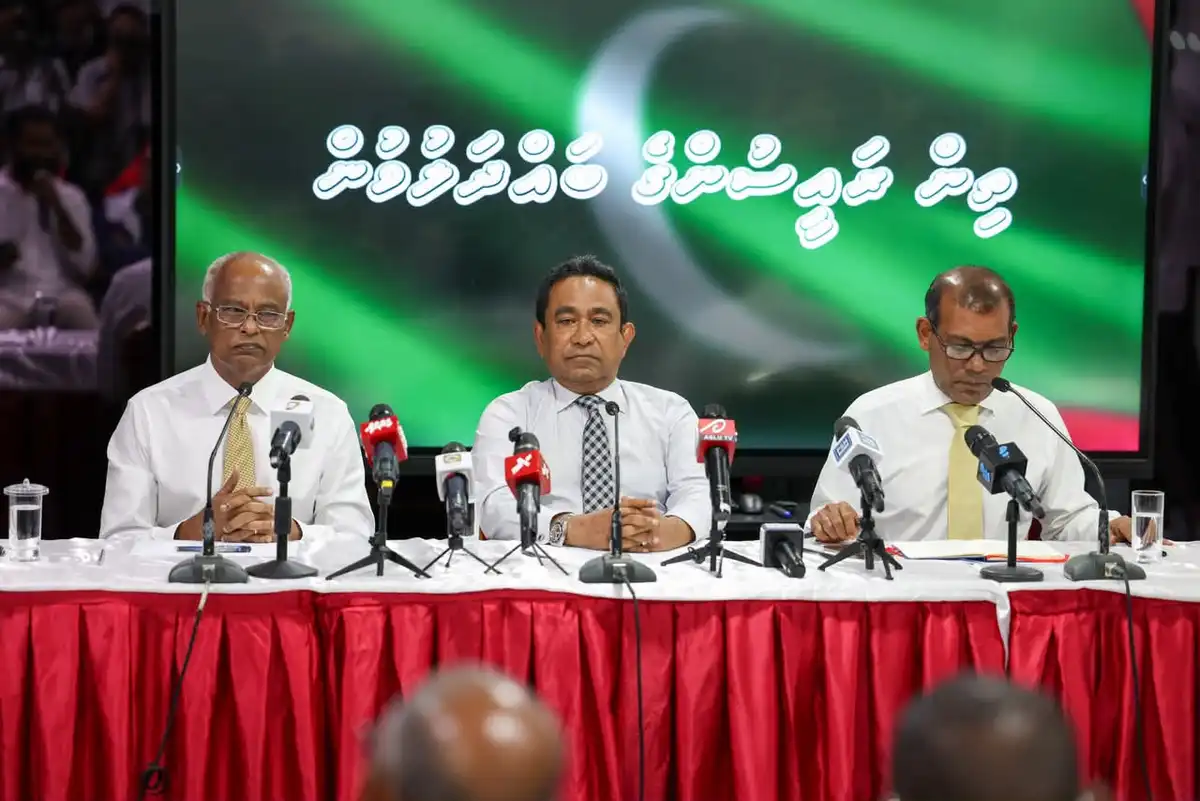
The Forminmation of Opposition Coalition of the Maldives, three former Presidents Mohamed Nasheed, Abdullah Yameen and Ibrahim Mohamed Solih agreed to work together.

On 13 May 2026, Abdullah Yameen announced that three former presidents, himself, Mohamed Nasheed and Ibrahim Mohamed Solih to form a opposition coalition to discuss working together for the protection of press freedom.

Nasheed announced that the MDP will hold daily protests to defend media freedom and oppose the arrest of journalists, warning during a Wednesday night rally that government intimidation of the press would negatively impact the nation's economy. While protesters demanded the immediate release of detained journalists, police used force to disperse the gathering, resulting in the arrest of ten individuals.

On 15 May 2026, three former presidents announced a mutual agreement to form the opposition coalition to steer the nation back onto the right course. They alleged that President Dr. Mohamed Muizzu’s administration is violating the constitution, exerting undue influence over state institutions, and restricting press freedom. Amidst a worsening economic crisis and rising inflation and less of tourist arrivals during the ongoing Middle Eastern conflict, the former leaders highlighted excessive government spending and reached a joint agreement to work together to restore national stability. Furthermore, they called on the administration to uphold democratic principles and immediately release detained journalists.

During the press brefing, Yameen stated that "enough is enough", and it is time to stand up against the current administration and advocate for the rights of journalists.

Nasheed expressed his profound regret that, as the current " Green Constitution" nears its 20th anniversary, journalists are once again forced to take to the streets to defend their rights. He warned that press freedom in the country has reached a perilous turning point.

Solih stated that they would remain steadfast in their efforts, doing everything possible to protect the nation from the challenges and difficulties imposed by President Muizzu. He further asserted that President Dr. Mohamed Muizzu’s administration has openly infringed upon the fundamental rights guaranteed to citizens by the Constitution and continues to exert undue influence over the judiciary.

=== Police response and brutality ===
The police and security forces took a hard line. Multiple incidents of force were reported. MDP protesters accused police of using pepper spray, riot gear and barricades to suppress them; legal observers claimed many actions violated existing laws.

On 18 April 2026, the police has forcefully detainted Vice President of the MDP Youth Wing Ahmed Maimoon Mohamed, leading him into major injury.

On 21 April 2026, the police has injured a individual using Taser gun and the victim has hospitalized at Indira Gandhi Memorial Hospital. The Maldivian Democratic Party has accused the police of obstructing its ongoing series of protests and using disproportionate force against demonstrators.

The police also decided to take L shaped couch on opposition protest.

On 12 May 2026, the police have arrested three PNF protesters and seized their protest pickup.

On 13 May 2026, the police detains 10 individuals during protest. The demonstration, which drew supporters from both the MDP and PNF, was forcibly dispersed by police, resulting in one individual being hospitalized for injuries and the seizure of a sofa used by protesters.

On 14 May 2026, Police used pepper spray without warning on protesters in Male' on Thursday night and arrested one individual.

The same day, the Maldives Police issued a statement urging organisers of rallies and demonstrations to ensure that their activities do not infringe upon the rights of other citizens. The police stated that while the freedom of peaceful assembly is protected under Article 32 of the Constitution and the Freedom of Peaceful Assembly Act, organisers are required to respect public safety, transportation infrastructure, and the rights of the general public. Authorities further warned that demonstrations held outside designated zones or without prior written authorisation in Malé would be dispersed, and legal action would be taken against organisers found violating the law.

=== Assassination attempt on Malé Mayor ===
On 24 April 2026, the current mayor of Malé city, Adam Azim was attacked by two indivituals Specifically, one of the individual pushed the Mayor and attempted to knock him to the ground. However, other protesters intervened and restrained the two individuals before any further assault could take place. Azim stated that such cowardly acts by the government would not intimidate them into backing down. The Mayor further asserted that they would remain steadfast in holding the government accountable.

=== Elections Commission response ===
The Elections Commission of the Maldives also intervened. In late April, it directed political parties to halt public protests and to refrain from personal attacks on officials. The commission’s chairman, Mohamed Zahid, received sharp criticism from protesters; demonstrators accused him of registering thousands of party members fraudulently and claimed he was biased.

The EC specifically fined the PNF MVR 100,000 (~$6,400) for “repeated violations” of the Political Parties Act and the Peaceful Assembly Act (including alleged obstruction of other parties’ events). PNF Secretary General Mohamed Maleeh Jamal dismissed the fine as "baseless", asserting that the party’s activities have been limited to town hall meetings rather than unlawful demonstrations.

=== Gag Order to censor "Aisha" documentary ===
On 11 May 2026, the Criminal Court issued a nationwide injunction prohibiting any direct or indirect discussion related to a documentary concerning allegations of an affair involving President Mohamed Muizzu. The court stated that the Prosecutor General’s Office had requested the injunction while the case remained under judicial review, citing previous rulings by the Supreme Court of the Maldives as legal precedent.

Following the order, the Maldives Media Council and the Maldives Broadcasting Commission instructed media outlets to halt coverage related to the documentary. The Elections Commission also directed the Maldivian Democratic Party (MDP) and the People's National Front (PNF) to refrain from discussing the documentary publicly.

On 12 May, the Kulhudhuffushi City Council announced restrictions for that year’s Mashi Maali Eid parade ahead of Eid al-Adha, banning the use of identifiable names and photographs in parade displays. The council stated that such depictions were inconsistent with Islamic values and social norms. The annual parade is traditionally known for satirical portrayals of political and social issues.

The same day, The President's Office barred journalists from Adhadhu from attending future press briefings involving the president, cabinet members, and the presidential spokesperson, citing alleged violations of the court order during a press conference.

== Response and condemnation ==
=== Government response ===
The government’s public messaging has been that it respects democratic processes but must enforce the law. After the referendum, President Muizzu said he would heed the result and work to address citizen concerns. In later press briefings, he claimed all measures (including mass deportations of migrants under “Operation Kurangi”, unrelated to the protests) are meant to safeguard rights, not punish anyone. Regarding media, the President’s spokesperson Mohamed Hussain Shareef on 12 May stated emphatically that portraying the court cases against reporters as “an attack on free press” was “unwarranted.” The spokesperson said the journalists had violated a valid court order and that these are normal legal procedures, denying any political motive. The Home Minister Ali Ihusaan defended police actions as necessary when protesters break agreed conditions.

According to Islamic sources, Slandering especially false adultery accusations are considered as a sin and in Surah An-Nur verse 4 states that "Those who accuse chaste women ˹of adultery˺ and fail to produce four witnesses, give them eighty lashes ˹each˺. And do not ever accept any testimony from them—for they are indeed the rebellious." President Muizzu was a pro-Islamist president in the Maldives that 100 religious scholars endorsed him in 2023 presidential elections. Analysts and opposition figures accused the government of selectively invoking Islamic values while restricting press freedom and political expression. Previous international reports during the administration of former president Abdulla Yameen under whom Muizzu served as housing minister described the Maldives as vulnerable to Islamist radicalization and recruitment by extremist groups including Islamic state and Al-Qaeda.

=== Civil orgainazation's and NGO's response ===
The Rights organizations warn that the overall trend is negative. Reporters Without Borders’s 2026 press freedom index commentary attributed the decline in Maldives’s score to "mounting pressure on independent media, controversial legislation and recent police action against journalists." The Committee to Protect Journalists (CPJ) noted that jailing reporters and criminalizing journalism sets a dangerous precedent. Maldivian NGO Transparency Maldives explicitly called on authorities to “lift travel restrictions” on journalists and refrain from using criminal law against the media. Transparency has condemned the imprisonment of two journalists, Leevan Ali Naseer and Mohamed Shahzan, as an attack on the foundations of democratic governance.

Parallel to media issues, freedom of assembly has also been cited. CIVICUS in February 2026 described the Maldives as having an “obstructed” civic space: it highlighted the new media law, police crackdowns on protests, and the cartoon ban as violations of international norms. he UN Special Rapporteur on Freedom of Expression reportedly told Muizzu’s government to ensure any restrictions meet strict necessity tests – a recommendation so far unheeded. Local human-rights lawyers argue the travel bans and secret trials violate the constitution’s guarantees of free speech and a fair hearing.
