= 2025 in the Maldives =

- Decades: 2000s; 2010s; 2020s
- See also: Other events of 2025; Timeline of Maldivian history

The following lists events that happened during 2025 in the Maldives.

== Incumbents ==
=== Government ===
- President: Mohamed Muizzu
- Vice President: Hussain Mohamed Latheef
- Majlis speaker: Abdul Raheem Abdulla
- Chief Justice:
  - Ahmed Muthasim Adnan (until 21 July)
  - Abdul Ghanee Mohamed (from 6 August)
- Majlis: 20th

== Events ==
=== Eclipses ===
- 7 September – September 2025 lunar eclipse – View in Malé.

=== January ===
- 1 January: The Maldives-China Free Trade Agreement comes into effect.
- 2 January: The Maldives bans tobacco materials including tobacco rolling papers, filters, and handheld machines used for rolling cigarettes.
- 3 January: Malé experiences 140 millilitres of rain, causing flooding.
- 28 January: Ibrahim Faisal is dismissed as Minister of Tourism for unknown reasons.

=== February ===
- 1 February: The Ministry of Tourism and the Ministry of Climate Change, Environment and Energy are merged to create the Ministry of Tourism and Environment.
- 11 February: The Maldives scores 38 points on the Corruption Perceptions Index, getting one point lower than in 2023.
- 21 February: The Ministry of Construction, Housing and Infrastructure starts to renovate Rasfannu Beach.

=== April ===
- 15 April: President Muizzu signs a law barring Israeli passport-holders except for dual citizens from entering the Maldives in solidarity with Palestine.
- 24 April: Protests occur in front of Sergeant Adam Haleel Criminal Investigations Building demanding justice for Hawwa Yumnu Rasheed. These protests later would be called the Dhuleh Nukuraanan protests.
- 27 April: President Muizzu establishes the "Special Presidential Commission of Inquiry into the Incident that Occurred in Malé on 18 April 2025" to investigate Yumn's falling.

=== May ===
- 3 May: President Muizzu holds a press conference that lasts nearly 15 hours, which his office says is a new record for a president.

=== June ===
- 7 June: Australia's Department of Foreign Affairs and Trade issued a warning to Aussie travelers that are travelling to the Maldives.
- 29 June: Maldives wins Indian Ocean's Leading Destination 2025 and Indian Ocean's Leading Green Destination 2025 of the World Travel Awards.

=== July ===
- 25 July: Indian prime minister Narendra Modi announces a $565-million line of credit to the Maldives as part of his visit to the country.
- 27 July: Guinness World Records awards Maldives Airports Company Limited the award for "Most Venues Performing Ceremonies and a Choreographed Fireworks Display".
- 28 July: Velana International Airport opens a new terminal.

=== August ===
- 27 August: Journalists protest at the President's Office over the controversial Maldives Media and Broadcasting Regulation Bill.
- 31 August: Environment activist Shaahina Ali becomes the first Maldivian to become a recipient of the Ramon Magsaysay Award, following her efforts to protect the country's marine ecosystems.

=== September ===
- 16 September: President Muizzu signs the Public Referendum Bill into law.
- 18 September: President Muizzu signs the Maldives Media and Broadcasting Regulation Bill into law and establishes the Maldives Media and Broadcasting Commission.

=== October ===
- 3 October: Eight people are arrested during protests in Malé against government corruption and repression.
- 12 October: President Muizzu issues Presidential Decree (No. 27/2025, issued 6 October 2025 under Article 115 of the constitution) formally called the referendum in Hulhudhoo, Meedhoo and Feydhoo.
- 22 October: A married couple is found dead in a house at Addu Hithadhoo.
- 24 October: FIFA President Gianni Infantino visits Maldives. Pro-Palestinian protesters are kicked out from Galolhu National Stadium after holding banners saying "Ban Israel From FIFA" citing FIFA's refusal to ban Israel due to the ongoing Gaza genocide.
- 25 October: 2025 Addu City referendum: a Referendum takes place in Addu City. Hulhudhoo and Meedhoo decide to separate while Feydhoo vote to remain in Addu City Council.

=== November ===
- 1 November: The Second Amendment to Tobacco Control Act takes effect.
- 9 November: Palestine national under-17 football team comes to the Maldives to take part in a training camp for the upcoming AFC U-17 Asian Cup qualifying matches.
- Hanimaadhoo International Airport reopens.
- 10 November: President Mohamed Muizzu expresses condolences on car explosion on Delhi.
- 14 November: Ahmed Mahloof joins Congress.
- 17 November: The Trump Organization and Saudi-based development partner Dar Al Arkan Real Estate Development Company have announced a luxury hotel in the Maldives.
- 29 November: Maldives extends relief support of $50,000 and donation of 25,000 cases of tuna cans to Sri Lanka following Cyclone Ditwah.
- 30 November: A national telethon organized by Television Maldives and 37 other media and news outlets held to raise funds for Sri Lanka following Cyclone Ditwah.

=== December ===
- 5 December: Maldives Raised over $834,843 to Sri Lanka, marking the country as Sri Lanka's biggest donor.
  - Sri Lankans living in Maldives held a peaceful gathering to express their gratitude and thanking Maldivians for helping Sri Lanka following Cyclone Ditwah.
- 6 December: President Mohamed Muizzu ratified amendments to the Drugs Act, introducing the death penalty for individuals convicted of smuggling drugs into the Maldives.
- 7 December: Maldives sets a new Guinness World Records for snorkeling with 307 people.

== Holidays ==
- 1 January – New Year's Day
- 2 January - New Year Holiday
- 6 February - Majlis Presidential Address and Opening of the Parliament
- 1 March – Ramadan
- 2 March - Post-Flood Holiday
- 20 March to 5 April – Eid al-Fitr Holiday
- 1 May – Labour Day
- 5 June to 9 June — Eid al-Adha
- 26 June – Islamic New Year
- 26 July – 60th Independence Day
- 27 July to 28 July — 60th Independence Day holiday
- 24 August – National Day (Qaumee Dhuvas)
- 4 September – Prophet Muhammad's Birthday
- 24 September – The Day Maldives Embraced Islam
- 2 November – Pre-Victory Day Holiday
- 3 November – Victory Day
- 11 November – Republic Day

== Academic Days ==
Sources:

- 11 January – Professional Development Day 03
- 24 January – International Day of Education
- 26 to 30 January – SSE and SIP
- 9 to 27 February – Grade 10 Mock Exam
- 9 to 27 February – Exam for Grade 11 to 12
- 15 to 27 February – Grade 7 to 9 Final exam
- 6 March – Annual holiday starts
- 7 March to 5 April – Annual Holiday
- 3 April– Teacher's Reporting Day
- 6 April – First day of school in Maldives (2025 April to December)
- 26 April – Professional Development Day 01
- May to June – GCE Ordinary Level Examination
- 24 May – PTS Meeting 01
- 31 May – Professional Development Day 02
- 5 June to 9 June — Eid al-Adha
- 21 June - PTS Meeting 02
- 5 to 19 July – Final Exam for Grade 11 to 12
- 5 to 19 July – Exam for Grade 7 to 10
- 24 July – School break
- 25 July to 9 August – School Break Holiday
- 10 August – Beginning of Second term in Maldives
- 10 August – First day of school for Grade 12 students (2025-2026)
- 14 September – First day of school for Grade 11 students (2025-2026)
- 19 September to 27 September– Mid-term Break
- 5 October – Teacher's day
- 18 October – Professional Development Day 03
- 2 to 6 November – SSE and SIP
- 22 to 29 November - PTS Meeting 03
- 6 to 20 December – Grade 10 Mock Exam
- 6 to 20 December – Exam for Grade 11 to 12
- 6 to 20 December – Grade 7 to 9 Final exam
- 25 December – Annual holiday starts
- 26 December 2025 to 26 January 2026 – Annual Holiday

== Deaths ==
- 31 January: Zameera Umar, 70, Mother of former First Lady Fazna Ahmed.
- 12 February: Mohamed Majeed, 60, singer.
- 9 June: Ibraheem Fareed, 52, Renowned Religious Scholar of the Maldives.
- 28 July: Hassan Sobir, NIIV, 73, Ambassador of the Maldives to Japan.
