= 2026 Maldivian constitutional referendum =

- 4 April 2026
- Ratification of the Eighth Amendment to the Constitution

Results
| Choice | Votes | % |
|---|---|---|
| Yes | 67,680 | 31.26% |
| No | 148,859 | 68.74% |
| Valid votes | 216,539 | 97.93% |
| Invalid or blank votes | 4,572 | 2.07% |
| Total votes | 221,111 | 100.00% |
| Eligible to vote/turnout | 294,876 | 74.98% |
- Results by county

A constitutional referendum was held in the Maldives on Saturday 4 April 2026, the same day as the local elections. The referendum asked voters whether they support shortening the current parliamentary term and amending the Constitution so that presidential and parliamentary elections are held on the same day in 2028. This referendum followed a Presidential decree and the newly enacted Public Referendum Act (Law No. 15/2025). The referendum did not pass, losing 68.7% to 31.3%. After the results, President Mohamed Muizzu acknowledged the outcome as the people’s will, with many seeing the result as a verdict on the government’s performance and a boost for the opposition.

== Background ==
In January 2026, the government of President Mohamed Muizzu and the ruling People's National Congress (PNC) introduced a constitutional amendment bill to shorten the term of the current People's Majlis (parliament) and to align the next parliamentary elections with the 2028 presidential election. Under the amendment, the parliamentary term would end on 1 December 2028, instead of its scheduled expiry in May 2029, and future parliamentary elections would be held concurrently with the presidential polls every five years.

Parliament passed the amendment bill in February 2026 with broad support, including 72 out of 73 MPs voting in favor, despite opposition protests and abstentions from some opposition lawmakers.

== Referendum legislation ==
Under Maldivian law, amendments to provisions governing the term of Parliament and the conduct of presidential elections require approval in a public referendum.

The government announced plans to hold the referendum on the same day as the 4 April 2026 local elections to reduce costs and logistical burdens. Officials from the Elections Commission and Attorney General Ahmed Usham noted that timing and legal requirements—such as the minimum 45-day preparation period—must be met for a concurrent referendum.

President Mohamed Muizzu issued Presidential Decree No. 2/2026 to seek views of the people to hold concurrent elections. It also set the date of the referendum on the same day as the local elections.

== Proposal ==
The referendum question being put to the public is “Do you approve the ratification of the Eighth Amendment to the Constitution, which provides for the Presidential and People’s Majlis elections to be held concurrently and for a change to the term of the People’s Majlis?”, with voters being given the choice to approve or deny.

== Response ==
=== Support ===
Members of the ruling People's National Congress and government leadership argue that aligning elections would save the state significant expenditures on electoral administration and logistics. Parliamentary majority leader Ibrahim Falah publicly supported holding the referendum alongside the local council elections to minimize costs and expedite implementation of the amendments.

Attorney General of the Maldives Ahmed Usham has stated that holding them on the same day would reduce the unrests happening in the country. The government had also said that there would be reduced logistical burdens as the schools that serve as polling stations wouldn't be closed as much, officials would have to be trained once, transportation would be more consolidated.

The Maldives Development Alliance announced that it supports the referendum and that it is the best course of action during the current state of the economy. The Jumhooree Party had also backed the referendum, with its leader Qasim Ibrahim noting that it was "long overdue". Adhaalath Party announced that it would also support the referendum after an internal meeting where they decided that it would be in the best interests of the nation and its citizens.

=== Opposition and criticism ===
The Maldivian Democratic Party (MDP) and other opposition figures have opposed the proposal. They argue that merging elections could reduce democratic accountability, extend the current government’s influence, and diminish Parliament’s role as a check on the executive. They also alleged that it is an attempt to deprive people of their right to vote.

Former MDP chairperson Fayyaz Ismail described the amendment as a strategy to secure an incumbent advantage “through the backdoor”, rather than a genuine reform to strengthen democracy. Opposition MPs also criticized the legislative process as rushed and have staged protests or boycotted extraordinary sittings on procedural grounds.

Former president Mohamed Nasheed had supported holding concurrent elections before later withdrawing his support. Former presidents Ibrahim Mohamed Solih and Abdulla Yameen also disagreed with holding concurrent elections.

Some commentators and civil society voices have raised concerns that simultaneous elections could amplify the "coattail effect", where voters choose the same party’s candidates across different levels of government, consolidating power.

Other political parties excluding the PNC called for the referendum to be postponed, saying that constitutional amendments shouldn't be rushed and that the public should be fully informed.

The MDP National Council passed a resolution unanimously to work against holding concurrent elections. The party had planned a series of activities including protests against the referendum vote. MDP had also filed a judicial review petition at the Civil Court, claiming that the referendum is being held unlawfully. They also asked the court for an injunction until the court makes a verdict. They launched a no campaign where they staged a pickup rally in Hulhumalé and put up banners in Malé.

Concerns were also raised by Husnu Al Suood who warned that the current wording of the question may not meet constitutional standards. Ibrahim Ismail backed Suood and said that the proposal doesn't meet Article 262 of the Constitution. Additionally, lawyers Aik Ahmed Easa and Ali Hussain filed a case at the Supreme Court to rescind the referendum, arguing that procedural requirements under the Constitution were not followed. On 23 March, the Supreme Court accepted the case and on 31 March, the Supreme Court ruled that referendum can continue. Chief Justice of the Maldives Abdul Ghanee Mohamed while delivering the judgement said that there's no provision or law that regulates the wording of the question on the ballot.

== Results ==
In the referendum, approximately 69% of voters opposed the proposal to hold presidential and parliamentary elections concurrently.

| Choice | Votes | % |
|---|---|---|
| For | 67,680 | 31.26 |
| Against | 148,859 | 68.74 |
| Total | 216,539 | 100.00 |
| Valid votes | 216,539 | 97.93 |
| Invalid/blank votes | 4,572 | 2.07 |
| Total votes | 221,111 | 100.00 |
| Registered voters/turnout | 294,876 | 74.98 |
Source: Elections Commission

== Reactions ==
President Mohamed Muizzu had posted on X that he fully accepted the election results and congratulated those who won. He further stated that he will keep working on to address issues within the government. Minister of Fisheries and Ocean Resources and PNC Vice President Ahmed Shiyam said that the party losing the elections indicates what should be done moving forward.

Former president Mohamed Nasheed has said that the people had delivered a unanimous "no" to the government in all three of the elections, while former president Ibrahim Mohamed Solih stated that the government should revise its public policies to keep in line with public sentiment.
