= Anti-corruption (disambiguation) =

Anti-corruption or anticorruption is anything that opposes or inhibits corruption.

== Organisations ==
=== Political parties ===
- Anti-Corruption Party, a Honduran political party
- The Justice & Anti-Corruption Party, a British political party

=== Commissions ===
- Anti-Corruption Commission (disambiguation)
  - Anti-Corruption Commission (Bangladesh)
  - Anti-Corruption Commission of Myanmar
  - Kenya Anti-Corruption Commission
  - Malaysian Anti-Corruption Commission
  - National Anti-Corruption Commission (Thailand)
  - Anti-Corruption Commission of Namibia
  - Sierra Leone Anti-corruption Commission

== Initiatives ==
- 2011 Indian anti-corruption movement, wide-scale protests throughout India, decrying systemic corruption
- Anti-corruption campaign under Xi Jinping, campaign to combat corruption at all levels of government within China; began in 2012 during the general secretaryship of Xi Jinping
- Russian anti-corruption campaign, coordinated effort by the Russian government to hinder corruption

== Other uses ==
- Anti-Corruption (film) (Lian zheng feng bo), 1975 Hong Kong film directed by Ng See Yuen

== See also ==
- International Anti-Corruption Day
- Corruption (disambiguation)
- List of anti-corruption agencies
- Political corruption
- Political dissent
- Whistleblowers
