= Ibrahim Falah =

MP for Inguraidhoo since 2024

Member of the Maldivian Parliament for Inguraidhoo
- Incumbent
- Assumed office 28 May 2024
- Preceded by: Hassan Ahmed
- In office 28 May 2014 – 28 May 2019
- Succeeded by: Hassan Ahmed

20th Parliament Majority leader
- Incumbent
- Assumed office 28 May 2024
- Preceded by: Mohamed Rasheed Hussain

Personal details
- Born: Innamaadhoo, Raa Atoll, Maldives
- Party: Congress (2023–present)
- Other political affiliations: Progressive (2014–2019)

Ibrahim Falah is a Maldivian politician who is currently serving as a Member of the People's Majlis for Inguraidhoo constituency since 2024, and from 2014 to 2019. A member of the Congress party, Falah is the 20th Parliament Majority leader.

== Political career ==
In 2014, Falah was elected a member of the People's Majlis to represent Inguraidhoo constituency, he was sworn in May 2014, and left the position following the 2019 Maldivian parliamentary election.

In April 2024, Falah was elected a member of the People's Majlis, and on 28 May 2024, he was sworn in to the position, representing Raa Inguraidhoo constituency. He later became the 20th Parliament Majority leader, as a member of the People's National Congress. In August 2024, he was elected the chair of the Housing Committee at the parliament.

=== Impalement of journalists ===
In relation to the controversial Maldives Media and Broadcasting Regulation Bill, Falah called for the impalement of journalists. He received backlash online and from the opposition. Falah defended himself by saying he didn't call for anyone to be executed. The Maldives Journalists Association filed a police case over his remarks saying that his remarkes contradict the principles of Islam. President Mohamed Muizzu vowed an investigation into his remarks but didn't condemn his remarks which drew criticism from civil society groups. The Maldives Police Service consulted the Prosecutor General's Office (PGO) in Falah's investigation.
