= Brenda Strassfeld =

American mathematician

Brenda Carol Strassfeld (born 1954) is a mathematics educator and the chair of the Mathematics Education Program in the Graduate School of Education at Touro College. Much of her research concerns teachers’ and students’ attitudes and beliefs regarding teaching and learning mathematics, specifically geometry. Strassfeld has presented her research and worked to improve teacher education at the local, national and international level for over thirty years.

== Education and career ==
Strassfeld received her bachelor's degree in mathematics and mathematics education and a master's degree in mathematics from Brooklyn College. After graduating, she taught a variety of classes as an adjunct, including courses in the mathematics department, and both elementary and secondary education at Brooklyn College. There, she also worked for the Center for Educational Change where she helped write a grant proposal called “What’s H.O.T. in Mathematics?”, a program that provided professional development in mathematics content and pedagogy to pre-service teachers at Brooklyn College and in-service New York City teachers. Later, Strassfeld worked briefly as a staff developer for District 2 of the New York City Department of Education.

In 2000, she began her job at New York University (NYU) Steinhardt School of Culture, Education and Human Development, where she remained for over a decade. During this time, she served as director and co-director of the undergraduate and graduate level secondary mathematics education program. Shortly after she began her job at NYU, she decided to continue pursuing her doctorate degree. She earned her Ph.D. in mathematics education from the University of Plymouth, UK in 2008.

In 2010, Strassfeld began her job at the Graduate School of Education, part of the Touro College and University System as the chair of the Mathematics Education program. She teaches pedagogy classes in secondary mathematics, specifically in geometry, statistics and probability. Strassfeld is also the EdTPA coordinator for the Graduate School of Education. In 2012 and 2013 she was part of the Visiting Faculty Program Feinberg Graduate School of Education- Weizmann Institute, Israel.
