= 2027 in the Maldives =

- Decades: 2000s; 2010s; 2020s
- See also: Other events of 2027; Timeline of Maldivian history

The following is a list of events that will occur in the Maldives in the year 2027, along with scheduled events that are yet to take place.

== Incumbents ==
=== Government ===
- President: Mohamed Muizzu
- Vice President: Hussain Mohamed Latheef
- Majlis speaker: Abdul Raheem Abdulla
- Chief Justice: Abdul Ghanee Mohamed
- Majlis: 20th

== Events ==
=== Eclipses ===
- 21 February – February 2027 lunar eclipse – View in Malé.
- 2 August – Partial Solar Eclipse of August 2, 2027 – View in Addu.

== Holidays ==
- 1 January – New Year's Day
- 8 February – Ramadan
- 28 Feb to 13 March – Eid al-Fitr Holiday
- 1 May – Labour Day
- 16 to 20 May — Eid al-Adha Holiday
- 6 June – Islamic New Year
- 26 July – 62nd Independence Day
- 27 July — 62nd Independence Day holiday
- 3 August – National Day (Qaumee Dhuvas)
- 14 August – Prophet Muhammad's Birthday
- 3 September – The Day Maldives Embraced Islam
- 3 November – Victory Day
- 11 November – Republic Day

== Academic Days ==
- 13 January – Teacher's Reporting Day
- 17 January – First day of school in Maldives
- 31 January – First day of school for Grade 11 / A'L Batch 27
- 24 January – International Day of Education
- 28 Feb to 13 March – Eid al-Fitr Holiday
- 21 to 25 March – Professional Development Days
- 1 to 15 April – Grade 12 Final examination & Grade 11 / A'L Batch 26 Mock examination
- 9 May to 10 June – School Transfer Period 1
- 16 to 20 May — Eid al-Adha Holiday (ie: Mid-term Break)
- 12 to 14 June – Camps and Activities (KS1-KS4)
- 29 June to 10 July – Exam
- 15 July – School break
- 16 to 31 July – School Break Holiday
- 1 August – Beginning of Second term in Maldives
- 26 Aug to 9 Sep – Grade 10, Grade 11 / A'L Batch 27 & Grade 12 Mock examination
- 19 to 25 September– Mid-term Break
- 5 October – Teacher's day
- October to November – GCE Ordinary Level & GCE Advanced Level Examination
- 10 October to 9 November – School Transfer Period 2
- 31 Oct to 10 November – National Curriculum Assessment
- 4 November – Professional Development Day
- 23 Nov to 4 December – Final examination
- 9 December – Annual holiday starts
- 10 December 2027 to 8 January 2028 – Annual Holiday
