= List of newspapers in the Maldives =

This is a list of notable newspapers and media outlets in the Maldives. The Maldives constitution guarantees freedom of expression as long as it is "not contrary to any tenet of Islam". There are both state-run and non-state media in the country.

A report released in December 2023 by the International Federation of Journalists (IFJ) and the Maldives Journalists Association (MJA) found that online news websites and platforms were the most popular news media accessed by Maldivian respondents (61%), while newspapers and magazines were mentioned by only 9%.

== In Dhivehi ==
- Mihaaru – Newspaper in Dhivehi; website is bilingual
- Voice - Online News in Dhivehi
- Dhauru - Newspaper in Dhivehi
- Vaadhoo Live - Newspaper in Dhivehi
- PSM News – State-run media outlet
- Raajje TV – Private, pro-opposition outlet
- Sun Online – Dhivehi and English
- Adhadhu – Private, bilingual website
- Mulhiraajje – Private, bilingual website

== In English ==
- Maldives Republic (MVrepublic)
- Maldives Voice
- Maldives Independent
- Miadhu
- The Edition
- PSM News
- Raajje TV
- Adhadhu
- Sun Online

== Defunct newspapers ==
- Haveeru Daily

== See also ==
- Sandhaanu
- Lists of newspapers
