= In-service program =

Professional training initiative

An in-service program or in-service training refers to professional training or staff development provision delivered as part of the working life of a person, as distinct from training before they enter a particular profession.

In health services, in-service training is a key component of continuing medical education for physicians, pharmacists, and other medical professionals. It is also common among public servants including educators and public safety officials.

In-service program also refers to some programs offered to enlisted members of the military while they are in service.

Educators also have in-service programs where they discuss methods, cases, and workloads. In some countries, in-service training days are known as an inset days: these are days when pupils are not required to attend school so that the whole teaching body can focus on an area of training or skill development.

In the Catholic Church, the Second Vatican Council suggested that priests should undertake in-service training, both in the form of a pastoral course to be undertaken immediately after their ordination, and at further intervals, "especially a few years after ordination".

== See also ==
- Inset day
- Pre-service teacher education
