= Maldives Media and Broadcasting Commission =

Mass media regulator of the Maldives

- މޯލްޑިވްސް މީޑިއާ އެންޑް ބްރޯޑްކާސްޓިންގ ކޮމިޝަން
- Logo used since 2026
- Predecessor: Maldives Media Council; Maldives Broadcasting Commission
- Formation: 18 September 2025; 12 months ago
- Headquarters: 2–3 floor, Billoorijehige
- Location: Galolhu, Malé, Maldives
- Official language: Dhivehi
- Secretary General: Hamdhy Ageel
- President: Mohamed Farusath
- Vice President: Zamath Ahmed Waheed
- Website: mmbc.gov.mv

The Maldives Media and Broadcasting Commission (Dhivehi: މޯލްޑިވްސް މީޑިއާ އެންޑް ބްރޯޑްކާސްޓިންގ ކޮމިޝަން; MMBC) is an independent regulatory body in the Maldives with the stated objective of maintaining press freedom and to establish a system to increase and oversee the responsibility of those working in media and journalists, including broadcast media. The commission was created by President Mohamed Muizzu on 18 September 2025 under the Maldives Media and Broadcasting Regulation Act.

== History ==
The Maldives Media and Broadcasting Commission was created following the ratification of the Maldives Media and Broadcasting Regulation Act. Many journalists and non government organizations called for the withdrawing of the bill in the People's Majlis. The bill had also sparked protests across Malé.

On 21 September 2025, the Civil Service Commission formed the interim committee of the commission.

In October, elections were held to appoint members to representing broadcasters and other media organisations. The Maldives Journalists Association had previously called for a boycott of the elections. Abdul Azeez Ibrahim and Zam’ath Ali Waheed representing broadcasters and Simaahaa Naseem and Husain Thafeeq representing other media was elected without vote. They were later appointed to the commission.

A few days later, three new members were appointed following parliamentary approval.

In November, Hamdhy Ageel was appointed as the secretary general of the commission.

=== Adhadhu cartoon controversy ===
In January 2026, the commission ordered news outlet Adhadhu to remove its political cartoon published in its SiyaaseeCartoon segment. The cartoon shows a prayer congregation with President Mohamed Muizzu stealing bank notes from an Imam's pocket. The commission alleged that the cartoon contradicts the fundamentals of Islam and may incite conflict. Adhadhu's CEO Hussain Fiyaz Moosa defended the cartoon and called the commission's action as politically motivated against Adhadhu. The commission banned the circulation of the cartoon despite the government saying that the commission will not have the power to regulate content published on the internet. Adhadhu had decided not to remove the cartoon despite an order being given to. After public criticism, the commission revised its decision and now stating that the media is requested not to share it. The commission had also warned Dhauru to remove the photograph of the cartoon from its article. Adhadhu had also filed a case with the Civil Court to challenge the order given by the commission. The International Federation of Journalists and the Committee to Protect Journalists condemned the commission, with international observers warning that the erosion of press freedom in the country is reaching a tipping point.

== Members ==
- Mohamed Farusath – President
- Zamath Ahmed Waheed – Vice President
- Safa Shafeeq
- Aminath Sarahath Izzath
- Hussain Sageef
- Simaha Naseem
- Abdul Azeez Ibrahim
