= Ahmed Shamheed =

MP for South Hulhumalé since 2024

- އަޙްމަދު ޝަމްހީދު
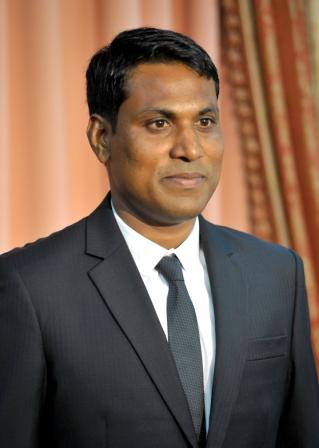
- Portrait, 2012

Member of the People's Majlis
- Incumbent
- Assumed office 28 May 2024
- President: Mohamed Muizzu
- Preceded by: Constituency created
- Constituency: South Hulhumalé

Minister of Transport and Communication
- In office 12 February 2012 – 8 November 2012
- President: Mohamed Waheed Hassan
- Preceded by: Mohamed Adil Saleem
- Succeeded by: Mohamed Nazim (acting); Ameen Ibrahim

Personal details
- Born: 25 August 1977 (age 49) Dhevvadhoo, Gaafu Alifu Atoll, Maldives
- Party: Maldivian Democratic Party (2013–present)
- Other political affiliations: Jumhooree Party (until 2013)
- Education: University of Leeds (PhD)

Ahmed Shamheed (Dhivehi: އަޙްމަދު ޝަމްހީދު; born 25 August 1977) is a Maldivian politician who has served as the member of the People's Majlis for the South Hulhumalé constituency since 2024 and previously served as the Minister of Transport and Communication of the Maldives from February 2012 to November 2012.

== Early life and education ==
Shamheed was born at Dhevvadhoo in Gaafu Alifu Atoll, Maldives. He obtained his PhD in civil engineering.

== Career ==
Shamheed originally served as an employee at the Ministry of Planning and Development during the Gayoom administration, before becoming a Jumhooree Party and serving as the Director at Villa Shipping and Trade. He was also a Director of the Maldives Tourism Development Corporation Board (MTDC).

On 12 February 2012, Shamheed was appointed by president Mohamed Waheed Hassan as the Minister of Transport and Communication. On 8 November, he was president Waheed dismissed him after he extended the lease of Maamigili Airport to Villa Group for 99 years. The JP later called the dismissal a "cowardly act". JP later tried proposed to the government to reinstate Shamheed but president Waheed rejected it.

In November 2013, Shamheed left the JP to join the Maldivian Democratic Party (MDP).

In 2024, Shamheed contested for the parliamentary elections where he contested for the constituency of South Hulhumalé, where he won.

In 2026, Shamheed announced his intention to run in the MDP presidential primary to get the party's ticket for the 2028 presidential election. There were concerns that Shamheed might lose his parliamentary seat due to the MVR 4.3 million loan he is owing to the Maldives Islamic Bank. He claimed that he will repay the loan.
