= Corrupt (disambiguation) =

A person who is corrupt is or has been spiritually or morally impure, or is acting/has acted illegally. By extension, the term is applied to a document, database or program being made unreliable by errors or alterations.

Corrupt may also refer to:

- Corrupt (1983 film), an Italian thriller film
- Corrupt (1999 film), an American crime film

== See also ==
- Corruption (disambiguation)
- Corruptor (disambiguation)
- Data corruption
- Kurupt
