= Skip Day =

Day on which U.S. students skip school

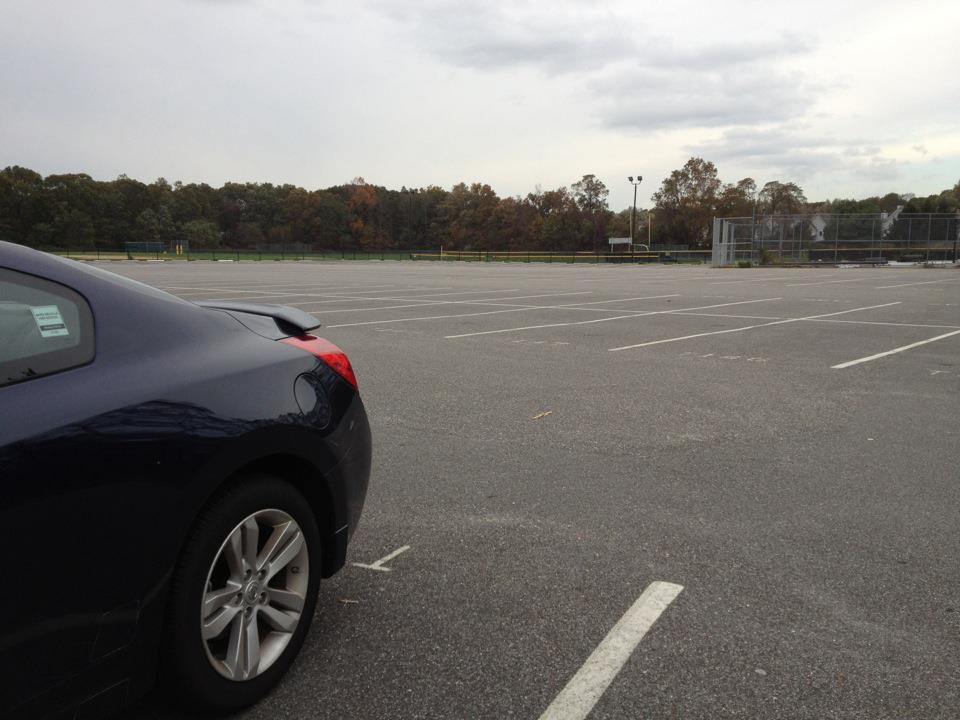
Parking lot on Skip Day at Ward Melville High School on November 1, 2011

Skip Day (also called Senior Day, Senior Skip Day, Ditch Day, Senior Ditch Day, Cut Day, or Senior Cut Day) is a tradition in schools where students in the senior class skip school.

== Description ==
It is commonly held the school day following senior prom, the Monday after the Super Bowl, on Halloween or other holidays on which students are not given the day off from school, or after another large event. Often, students will gather at an alternate location during Skip Day.

School administration reactions can vary greatly in response to Skip Day. Some schools openly encourage the practice, helping the students pick a day to take off and advising teachers not to schedule exams on that day.

There is no generally agreed-upon beginning to the tradition, but there are records of Skip Days as far back as the 1930s. The film Ferris Bueller's Day Off was a catalyst for several Senior Skip Days in the 1980s and mid 1990s. At Caltech, "Ditch Day" has become an annual tradition. The occasion was also notably depicted in Steven Spielberg's 2022 semi-autobiographical film The Fabelmans, in which the protagonist Sammy Fabelman films 16mm footage of his school's "Ditch Day" at the beach during a montage sequence set to James Darren's "Goodbye Cruel World." This culminates in a short film that Sammy then edits, highlighting the events of that day, which is presented at his school's prom.

== See also ==
- Inset day
- Senioritis
