= Maldives Media and Broadcasting Regulation Act =

Legislation of the Maldives

People's Majlis
- Territorial extent: Maldives
- Passed: 16 September 2025
- Enacted: 18 September 2025
- Assented to by: President Mohamed Muizzu
- Signed: 18 September 2025

Legislative history
- Introduced by: Abdul Hannan Aboobakuru
- Introduced: 19 August 2025
- Committee responsible: Independent Institutions
- First reading: 19 August 2025
- Voting summary: 49 voted for; 12 voted against; 5 present not voting
- Considered by the Independent Institutions Committee: 19 August 2025 – 16 September 2025
- Second reading: 16 September 2025
- Voting summary: 60 voted for; 1 voted against; 14 present not voting
- Status: In force

The Maldives Media and Broadcasting Regulation Act (Act No. 16/2025) is a controversial Maldivian law regulating print, broadcast and other media. It was introduced in the People's Majlis by independent member for Thulhaadhoo Abdul Hannan Aboobakuru on 19 August 2025 and passed by the Majlis on 16 September 2025. President Mohamed Muizzu ratified the bill on 18 September 2025, bringing it into effect. It was signed into law by President Mohamed Muizzu on 18 September 2025. The law had garnered global interest and international condemnation.

The Act dissolved the Maldives Media Council and reconstituted the Maldives Broadcasting Commission as the Maldives Media and Broadcasting Commission, a single regulatory authority for print and broadcast media. The legislation has faced criticism from journalists' groups and international human rights organisations over the Commission's powers and independence.

== History ==
In November 2024, Aboobakuru submitted his similar bill called the "Maldives Media and Broadcasting Commission Bill". The bill if passed, were to abolish the Maldives Broadcasting Commission (Broadcom) and the Maldives Media Council (MMC) and create the Maldives Media and Broadcasting Commission (MMBC). The commission would have seven members, four members including the president and vice president were to be appointed by the president of the Maldives with the approval of the Majlis, while the remaining three would be appointed by the media. The bill proposed fines of MVR 10,000 for individual reporters. The Maldives Journalists Association and the Maldivian Democratic Party called for the retractment of the bill. Aboobakuru initially denied any requests for withdrawing the bill, although a few days later he withdrew the bill.

In 2025, he submitted the Maldives Media and Broadcasting Regulation Bill to the parliament. The bill was accepted by a vote of 49–12. The bill if passed would replace Broadcom and MMC with the MMBC. The commission would be able to impose fines of up to MVR 100,000 on media outlets, temporarily cancel media registrations even before cases are investigated, go to court to revoke a registration, order websites to be blocked or broadcasts stopped during investigations, investigate complaints from incidents that occurred up to a year before the bill is ratified.

The government had also endorsed the bill with the Attorney General Ahmed Usham stating that there's no need for the bill to be withdrawn.

The Parliament's Independent Institutions Committee announced to hold a consultation meeting with the media regarding the bill. On 9 September, the committee held a closed meeting to discuss about the bill stating that personal information may be revealed. The committee had also ousted journalists from the room and locked them out. The CPJ called out the Majlis for the incident in which the Majlis secretariat said in a statement that the journalists forcibly entered the room, a fact proven false with video evidence.

Political appointees had also launched a campaign called the '#PassTheMediaBill' in response to the trending '#SaveOurSocials' trending on Twitter.

On 15 September, the committee locked journalists out of the room and voted to pass the bill.

On 16 September, the People's Majlis passed the bill.

On 17 September, the Maldivian Democratic Party announced plans to file a case at the Supreme Court to annul the law claiming that it was approved in violation of existing laws and procedures.

On 18 September, president Mohamed Muizzu ratified the bill into law and established the Maldives Media and Broadcasting Commission.

On 19 September, Adhadhu declared 'solidarity with journalists and media outlets across the Maldives in rejecting this draconian legislation'. The MJA vowed civil disobedience and encouraged a boycott of the election of members to the new commission.

On 21 September, the Civil Service Commission formed the interim executive committee of the commission.

In February 2026, the Maldives Journalists Association filed a constitutional case at the High Court and requested an interim order to prevent the Maldives Media and Broadcasting Commission from taking any disciplinary action against any journalist until the case reaches conclusion.

On 4 May 2026, Maldivian journalists launched a petition calling for the repealment of the law.

=== Protests ===
This sparked protests from journalists from various news outlets such as Mihaaru and Adhadhu. They held a silent protest inside the Majlis gallery. Journalists protested outside of the People's Majlis building and the President's Office where they were arrested by the police, which they denied ever doing. The MDP condemned the arrests.

President Mohamed Muizzu met with the MJA to discuss about the bill.

On 9 September, journalists staged a protest after being kicked out the room of the Independent Institutions Committee by parliament security.

On 16 September, police grabbed a journalists neck and manhandled him during a protest and closed the area surrounding the Majlis, the President's Office, and the Republic Square. During the voting for the bill, protests were happening in and outside the Majlis building calling for the bill to be rejected. MP's representing the Maldivian Democratic Party were removed by Deputy Speaker Ahmed Nazim. Two people were arrested in the protest.

On 17 September, Sri Lankan journalists protested at the Maldivian High Commission in Colombo urging Muizzu not to ratify the bill. MDP also submitted a complaint to the National Integrity Commission (NIC) over the police conduct and alleged police brutality during the protests on 16 September. The Maldives Police Service denied the police brutality claims and said that 'minimum force' was used to disperse the protests.

On 19 September, a protest gathering is being planned at Usfasgandu.

On 24 September, the NIC launched an investigation into police brutality at the protests.

=== Domestic and international criticism ===
The Maldives Journalists Association (MJA) called for the withdrawal of the bill entirely along with the Maldivian Democratic Party (MDP). This was followed by Reporters Without Borders, Human Rights Watch, International Federation of Journalists, Committee to Protect Journalists condemning and calling for the withdrawal of the bill. Former president Abdulla Yameen alleged that the government is intending to conceal issues using the bill.

The MMC called for the president to veto the bill and that it'll pose a threat to journalism. Broadcom said that the bill is impossible to implement.

The MJA submitted a petition to the People's Majlis urging the MPs and the president to reject the bill.

When the bill was passed, the IFJ condemned the passing of the bill. The U.S. Embassy in the Maldives called for the government to uphold the freedoms of expression, including dissenting and opposition voices and the Bar Council of the Maldives called for the president to reconsider signing the bill. The CPJ urged Muizzu to reject the bill.

The High Commission of the United Kingdom in the Maldives called for government to uphold freedom of the press and freedom of expression as they reaffirmed in 2024 at the 2024 CHOGM meeting in Samoa.

Spokesperson Ravina Shamdasani of the UN Human Rights Office has said that the UN Human Rights commissioner Volker Türk called for the repealment of the law and how it "undermine media freedom and the right to freedom of expression for the people of the Maldives if not withdrawn."

Civicus condemned the law and rated the Maldives as "obstructed" as the state of civic space.

=== Government response ===
Muizzu's cabinet defended the law on social media. Foreign Minister Abdulla Khaleel claimed that the legislation protects freedom of expression. Information Minister Ibrahim Waheed said that the bill is a step towards accountability and professionalism while noting that there are rooms for improvements. Defence Minister Mohamed Ghassan Maumoon said that the law was debated and went through parliamentary process and saying that media groups have representation.

In response to the mounting international criticism, Muizzu accused journalists of spreading fake news. He also said that he didn't care about any statements the international organisations make. Muizzu also said that he won't allow anyone to challenge, disobey, or defy any laws.

== See also ==
- Censorship in the Maldives
