= 2023 in the Maldives =

- Decades: 2000s; 2010s; 2020s
- See also: Other events of 2023; Timeline of Maldivian history

The following is a list of events that happened during 2023 in the Maldives.

== Incumbents ==
- President:
  - Ibrahim Mohamed Solih (until 17 November)
  - Mohamed Muizzu (from 17 November)
- Vice President:
  - Faisal Naseem (until 17 November)
  - Hussain Mohamed Latheef (from 17 November)
- Majlis speaker:
  - Mohamed Nasheed (until 13 November)
  - Mohamed Aslam (from 13 November)
- Chief Justice: Ahmed Muthasim Adnan
- Majlis: 19th

== Events ==
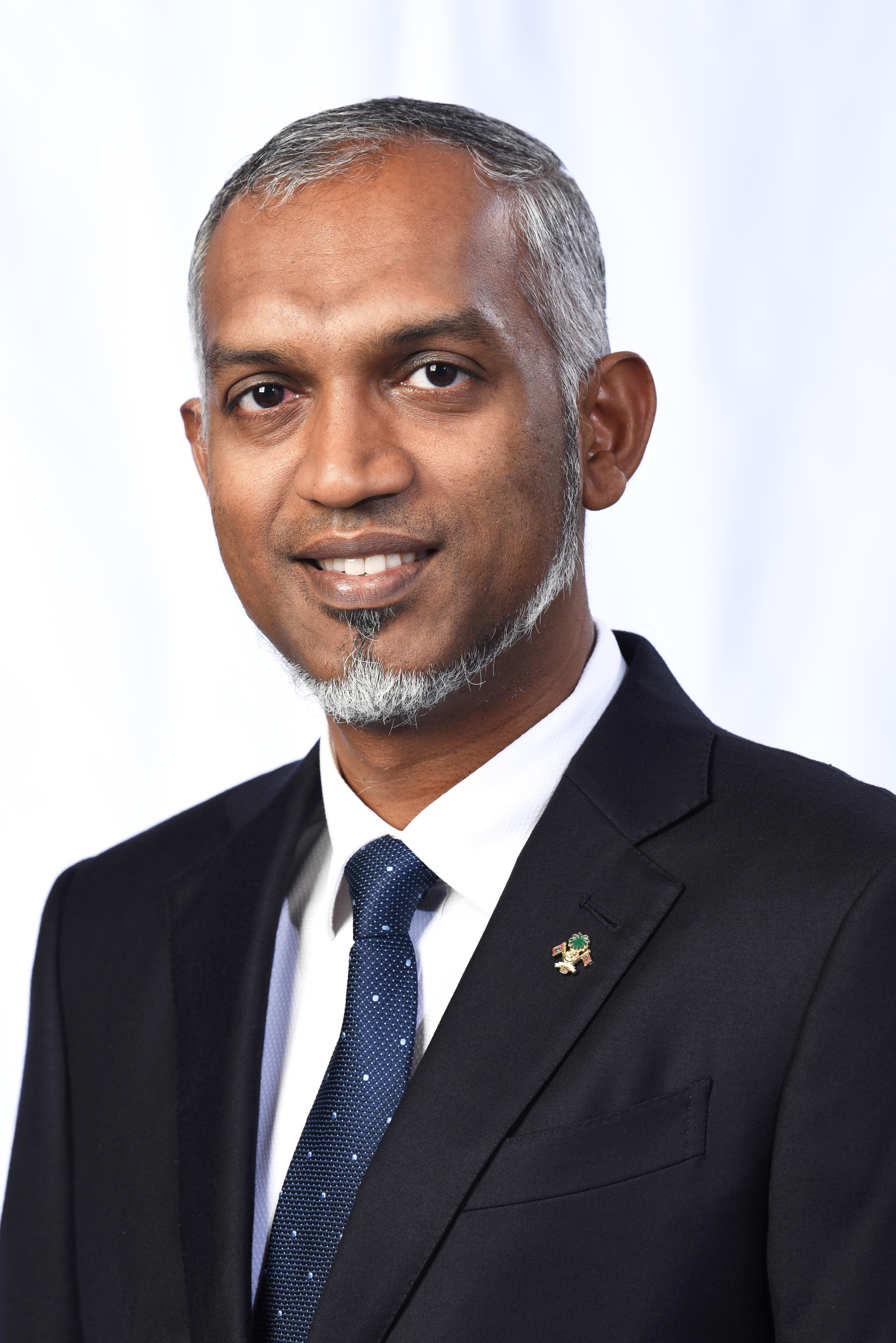
Mohamed Muizzu took over as president from 17 November

- 21 May: 12 members leave the Maldivian Democratic Party and create a New Party called "The Democrats".
- 21 June: Former president Mohamed Nasheed leaves MDP after 18 years.
- 28 June: Maldives is eliminated from semi-final round for the first time in Maldives SAFF history.
- 6 August: Former president Abdulla Yameen is disqualified from the 2023 Maldivian presidential election due to his terrorism financing sentence.
- 28 August: Hussain Adam's father dies.
- 9 September: 2023 Maldivian presidential election: Maldivians elect their president. No candidate receives a 50% majority, so incumbent President Ibrahim Mohamed Solih faces opposition candidate and Malé mayor Mohamed Muizzu in the second round on September 30.
- 30 September: 2023 Maldivian presidential election: Maldivians vote in a runoff election between candidates Mohamed Muizzu and Ibrahim Mohamed Solih.
- 1 October: Abdulla Yameen is transferred from prison to house arrest following the election of PNC candidate Mohamed Muizzu as president.
- 13 October: Pro-Palestine protests are held around the Maldives due to the 2023 Israeli invasion of the Gaza Strip.
- 24 November: Abdulla Yameen leaves PPM.
- 25 November: Abdulla Yameen forms a new party called "People's National Front".
- 15 December: The Communications Authority of Maldives (CAM) had blocked all access to pornography content in the Maldives due to orders given by the government.
- 22 December: After the government censors pornographic websites, two news websites critical of Muizzu's government are blocked. After public backlash, the websites are unblocked on 28 December.
- 26 December: Government mandates filariasis to be included in medical test for migrant workers.
- 31 December: Malé, and other islands are flooded due to bad weather, damaging several homes and displacing residents.

== Holidays ==
- 1 January – New Year's Day
- 23 March – Ramadan
- 21 April – Eid al-Fitr
- 1 May – Labour Day
- 28 June — Eid al-Adha
- 18 July – Islamic New Year
- 26 July – Independence Day
- 10 to 11 September – Post-Election Holiday
- 16 September – National Day (Qaumee Dhuvas)
- 28 September – Prophet Muhammad's Birthday
- 1 to 2 October – Post-Election Holiday
- 16 October – The Day Maldives Embraced Islam
- 3 November – Victory Day
- 11 November – Republic Day

== Academic days ==
- 8 January – Beginning of Second term in Maldives
- 22 January to 9 February – Final exam for Grade 11
- 24 January – International Day of Education
- 2 February – Professional Development Day 02 (Some schools in Maldives where closed on this day)
- 16 March – Professional Development Day 03 (Some schools in Maldives where closed on this day)
- 16 to 23 April – Eid al-Fitr Holiday (i.e.: Mid-term Break)
- 14 to 18 May – SSE and SIP
- May to June – GCE Ordinary Level Examination
- 28 May to 15 June – Final exam for grade 7 to 12
- 22 June – Annual holiday starts
- 23 June to 5 August – Annual Holiday
- 1 August – Teacher's Reporting Day
- 6 August – First day of school in Maldives (2023 to 2024)
- 20 August to 7 September – Exam for Grade 12
- 3 September – Classes begin for Grade 11 students in Maldives
- 14 September – Professional Development Day 01 (Some Schools in Maldives where closed on this Day)
- October to November – GCE A-level Examination
- 5 October – Teacher's day
- 15 to 21 October – Mid-term Holiday
- 12 to 23 November – Exam for Grade 10
- 3 to 14 December – Exam for Grade 8, 9, 11 & 12
- 21 December – School break
- 22 December 2023 to 6 January 2024 – School Break Holiday

== Sport ==
Association football

- 2023 SAFF Championship
- 2023 SAFF U-19 Championship
- 2023 SAFF U-16 Championship

Other sports

- Maldives at the 2023 World Aquatics Championships
- 2023 Indian Ocean Island Games
- FIFA World Cup qualification
