= Skeelan =

2023 documentary film

- Youtube thumbnail
- Created by: Adhadhu
- Original languages: English; Dhivehi

Production
- Production locations: Maldives, Sri Lanka
- Running time: 14:56

Original release
- Release: 26 September 2023

Skeelan is a 2023 investigative documentary produced by Adhadhu. Skeelan is about the alleged mistreatment and deportation from the Maldives of Gnei Skeelan, a Sri Lankan national and the stepmother of the President Mohamed Muizzu.

This film examines the inheritance dispute which followed after the death of Muizzu's father, Hussain Abdul Rahman, and the circumstances surrounding her deportation from the Maldives in 2016, as well as her current relations with Muizzu's family.

== Description ==
Gnei Skeelan Hussain was married to Hussain Abdul Rahman, the father of Mohamed Muizzu from 2002 until Rahman's death in 2015. Following his death, Skeelan allegedly signed away her inheritance rights after then–Housing Minister Mohamed Muizzu allegedly promised to provide her financial support. She claims that Muizzu didn't uphold it, which led to her deportation from the country and her being blacklisted. She also claims that Muizzu's family cut ties with her.

== Reception and controversy ==
The documentary received the investigative reporting award at the 11th Journalism Awards organized by the Maldives Media Council (MMC).

=== Government response ===
During the 11th Journalism Awards, a small clip of the documentary was played at the ceremony, which was allegedly against Public Service Media (PSM)'s editorial policy. It also caused MMC President Ahmed Musthafa to be fired by PSM, he was later reinstated the same day. MMC also considered revocating the award. The Maldivian government later directed the Anti-Corruption Commission to raid the MMC's headquarters regarding the issuance of the award due to massive government pressure. In an interview with PSM, Muizzu denied all the allegations.

Maldives Immigration also stated that they had started an investigation onto how Skeelan was deported and how she ended up on the blacklist.
