= Corruptor (disambiguation) =

The Corruptor is a fictional character appearing in American comic books published by Marvel Comics.

Corruptor may also refer to:

- The Corruptor, a 1999 American film
- The Corruptor (soundtrack), soundtrack to the film, composed mostly of hip hop songs

== See also ==
- Corrupt (disambiguation)
- Corruption (disambiguation)
