= List of organizations designated as terrorist by the Maldives =

The Republic of Maldives, through its relevant legal and administrative frameworks, maintains a list of organizations designated as terrorist entities. This designation reflects the nation's efforts to combat terrorism and enhance national and regional security. The list includes domestic and international organizations identified as threats to the sovereignty and safety of the Maldives. The official designation process is overseen by the Ministry of Defence and related governmental bodies.

== Legal framework ==
The Maldives' approach to counter-terrorism is governed by its Prevention of Terrorism Act (Law No. 32/2015) and associated regulations. The Act outlines criteria for designating organizations as terrorist entities, including:

- Involvement in acts of terrorism.
- Financing or facilitating terrorism.
- Advocacy for extremist ideologies that threaten peace and security.

== Designation process ==
The designation of an organization as a terrorist entity involves several steps:

- Investigation: Security and intelligence agencies conduct investigations to determine the organization's involvement in terrorist activities.
- Recommendation: Findings are forwarded to the Ministry of Defence for review.
- Official Declaration: The organization is officially listed in the government’s gazette as a terrorist entity.
- Notification: Relevant national and international stakeholders are informed.

== Lists ==
The Maldives has designated several organizations as terrorist entities. As of the latest update, some notable groups include:

- Al-Qaeda: A global terrorist organization involved in numerous international attacks.
- ISIS (Islamic State of Iraq and Syria): Known for its extremist activities and territorial ambitions in the Middle East.
- Local Extremist Groups: Several smaller, Maldives-based groups have also been designated due to their involvement in extremist propaganda and recruitment efforts.

=== Other lists ===
- Abu Sayyaf Group
- Boko Haram
- Harkat-ul-Jihad al-Islami
- Hurras al-Din
- Islamic State - Khorasan Province
- Jaish-e-Mohammed
- Jamaah Ansharut Daulah
- Jamathei Milathu Ibrahim
- Lashkar-e-Taiba
- National Thowheeth Jama'ath
- Al-Nusra Front
- Pakistani Taliban
- Al-Qaeda in the Arabian Peninsula
- Al-Qaeda in the Islamic Maghreb
- Al-Qaeda in the Indian Subcontinent
- Al-Shabaab (militant group)
- Wilayat as-Seylani
- Israel Defence Forces

=== Removed list ===
- Hay'at Tahrir al-Sham (dissolved in January 2025)

The Maldives has not designated Hamas, Hezbollah, Hindutva, the Houthis, the Israel Defense Forces (IDF), or Rashtriya Swayamsevak Sangh as terrorist organizations.

== Travel restrictions ==
Maldives has banned travel to Syria due to the outgoing civil war and insurgency. This decision, made under the Prohibition of Terrorism Act, aims to prevent Maldivians from joining terrorist organizations, as some have done in the past. The revised law allows the president to designate terrorist organizations and conflict zones, making unauthorized travel to these areas a criminal offense.

In February 2026, Maldivian authorities lifted the long-standing travel ban to Syria and removed Hay’at Tahrir al-Sham from the terrorist organisation list following its dissolution and integration into the Syrian state apparatus.

== See also ==
- 1988 Malé attack
- 2007 Malé bombing
- 2011 Ismail Khilath Rasheed controversy
- 2015 Attempted assassination of Abdulla Yameen
- 2021 Attempted assassination of Mohamed Nasheed
