= Aisha (2026 film) =

2026 documentary film

- Youtube thumbnail
- އައިޝާ
- Based on: Mohamed Muizzu
- Release date: 28 March 2026
- Running time: 30:10
- Country: Maldives
- Language: Dhivehi

Aisha (Dhivehi: އައިޝާ) is a 2026 Maldivian documentary film produced and released by Adhadhu. The documentary examines allegations of an affair involving Maldivian president Mohamed Muizzu and a woman identified under the pseudonym "Aisha".

== Synopsis ==
The documentary examines allegations concerning an extramarital relationship between Aisha and Maldivian president Mohamed Muizzu.

According to the film, Aisha first contacted the president in December 2024 seeking employment, citing prior association through political work with the People's National Congress (PNC). Following a meeting, she was later employed at the President’s Office as an Executive Administrator.

Aisha alleges that she subsequently entered into a sexual relationship with the president within his office. She also claims that she received financial support, including monthly payments of MVR 50,000 and, on one occasion, MVR 70,000, which she states were facilitated through the president’s personal secretary, Hassan.

The documentary further presents allegations that Muizzu communicated with Aisha frequently between January and April 2025 via the encrypted messaging application Signal, including repeated calls and messages outside working hours. She also alleges that Muizzu promised to marry her as a second wife and provide support for her child.

According to Aisha, she was later transferred to Ministry of Social and Family Development and later to the Ministry of Higher Education, Labour and Skills Development following the discovery of the relationship by Muizzu's wife Sajidha Mohamed.

It was revealed on 5 May 2026, that the identity of "Aisha" is Aishath Easha Ashraf, a former political appointee.

== Reception ==
Death threats were made against Adhadhu CEO Hussain Fiyaz Moosa and journalist Mohamed Shahuzan following the release of the documentary. The pair stated that they plan to file a police complaint over the death threat.

=== Government response ===
When asked for comment, the President's Office's Spokesperson Heena Waleed denied the allegations, stating that the allegations are "baseless and blatant lies".

A complaint was filed by Adhadhu to the Maldives Police Service to verify the claims told in the documentary.

The Maldives Media and Broadcasting Commission announced that it would be investigating the documentary and formally notified Adhadhu. On 27 April 2026, President Mohamed Muizzu denied all allegations about the documentary. Shortly after, the Maldives Police Service raided Adhadhu's office under a court order and seized many electronics. The court warrant accused Adhadhu and its staff of qazf – the criminal charge of falsely accusing someone of unlawful sexual intercourse – which they deny.

A wave of backlash was met against the police and the government following the raid with Maldivian Democratic Party (MDP) President Abdulla Shahid condemning the raid into the office and describing it as an attack into press freedom along with former MDP chairperson Fayyaz Ismail. Former presidents Ibrahim Mohamed Solih and Abdulla Yameen expressed concern about the police's actions with the latter saying that Muizzu should reform his administration.

Defending the police's actions, Homeland Minister Ali Ihusaan said that the police has a right to investigate false claims of zina against the President. Many of the ministers in Muizzu's cabinet tweeted on X in support of him. Former Chief Justice of the Maldives Ahmed Abdulla Didi alleged that Homeland Minister was influencing the investigation into the documentary, which he denied.

Adhadhu's CEO Hussain Fiyaz Moosa and Editor Hassan Mohamed had their passports seized in connection with the investigation into the documentary. A travel ban was also issued on Aishath Eesha Ashraf as she was accused of being part of the production of the documentary.

The Committee to Protect Journalists called on the Maldivian government to return seized equipment and to lift travel bans on all Adhadhu staff. The International Federation of Journalists and the Maldives Journalists Association (MJA) echoed similar concerns and condemened the actions taken by the government. The British Ambassador to the Maldives Nick Low expressed concern and that such actions are inconsistent with the Maldives has placed in upholding Commonwealth standards. An emergency motion was submitted by MDP Galolhu South MP Meekail Ahmed Naseem seeking an investigation into the police raid into the Adhadhu office but the motion was denied.

On 29 April, Adhadhu Editor Hassan Mohamed along with CEO Hussain Fiyaz Moosa had been summoned to police and questioned over the documentary, with the summons chit saying that Qazf was committed. The police had also presented five charges against the pair, with both of them being charged with vicarious liability and complicity (Section 30 of the Penal Code), vicarious liability and complicity (Section 30(a)(2) of the Penal Code), defamation (Qazf), dolicitation to commit an offense, and conspiracy to commit an offense.

On 30 April, The President's Office's spokesperson Mohamed Hussain Shareef revealed that the Police initiated the criminal investigation into Adhadhu at the direction of the Prosecutor General's Office (PGO).

The International Press Institute and Transparency Maldives condemned the raid into Adhadhu's office and the latter called for the withdrawal of criminal charges against the journalists.

On 5 May, Ashraf was served a police summons and was suspected of her involvement in the documentary or false allegations of adultery with Muizzu. She had her passport seized the next day by police.

On 10 May, the Criminal Court charged Moosa and Mohamed with Qazf and issued a gag order to restrict the circulation of the documentary until the case is concluded. The court had also decided to hold the trial under a closed door to uphold community moral standards.

On 11 May, Adhadhu journalist Mohamed Shahzan, was removed from the President's Office after he asked a question to Muizzu about the documentary, in violation of the gag order. The Maldives Media and Broadcasting Commission later barred Adhadhu journalists from attending government press offices for the duration of the legal proceedings.

On 12 May, Adhadhu journalist Leevan Ali Nasir was jailed for contempt of court for writing about the court order to prohibiting discussion of the "Aisha" documentary. Adhadhu journalist Mohamed Shahzan was also jailed for questioning Muizzu about his relations with the woman.

The MJA expressed solidarity with Nasir and Shahzan and called on the Muizzu government to end attacks on free press. The Committee to Protect Journalists called on the government to end criminal proceedings against Adhadhu. Transparency Maldives called for their immediate release and raised concern regarding due process and constitutional protections. Former presidents Mohamed Nasheed, Abdulla Yameen, and Ibrahim Mohamed Solih raised concerns and called for the release of the journalists. Former Maldivian Democratic Party (MDP) chairperson Fayyaz Ismail called for people to not obey the court order and MDP President Abdulla Shahid called for release of them.

The MJA filed an appeal against the gag ordered issued to the High Court and was denied as they were not a party to the case, they later filed a review of the dismissal on 18 May, The High Court accepted an appeal from Moosa and scheduled the hearing for June 29. The hearing was held in secret.

On 25 August, the court ruled that items seized by police from Adhadhu's office cannot be returned as investigation continues. In September, the PG's office pressed charges against Ashraf for Qazf.
