= Anti-Corruption Commission =

Anti-Corruption Commission may refer to:

- Anti-Corruption Commission (Bangladesh)
- Anti-Corruption Commission of Myanmar
- Kenya Anti-Corruption Commission
- Malaysian Anti-Corruption Commission
- National Anti-Corruption Commission (Thailand)
- Anti-Corruption Commission of Namibia
- Sierra Leone Anti-corruption Commission
- National Anti-Corruption Commission (Australia)

== See also ==
- Anti-corruption (disambiguation)
