= 2025 Addu City referendum =

2025 Addu referendum
- 25 October 2025
- Proposed restructuring of Addu City Council
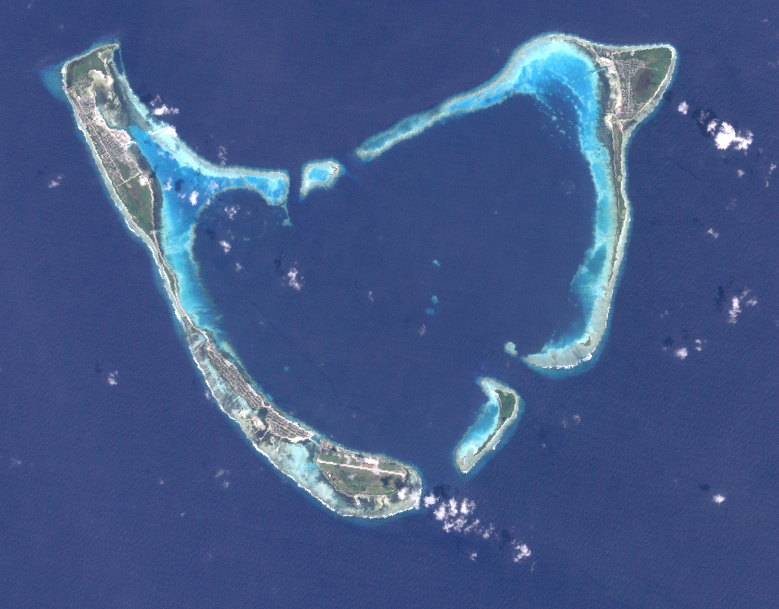
- Addu Atoll, Maldives

Results
| Choice | Votes | % |
|---|---|---|
| Separate Hulhudhoo, Meedhoo and Feydhoo | 2,176 | 49.15% |
| Remain under Addu City Council | 2,251 | 50.85% |
| Valid votes | 4,427 | 98.55% |
| Invalid or blank votes | 65 | 1.45% |
| Total votes | 4,492 | 100.00% |
| Registered voters/turnout | 9,576 | 46.91% |

Separate Feydhoo
| Yes | 25.40% |
| No | 73.61% |

Separate Hulhudhoo
| Yes | 67.29% |
| No | 30.37% |

Separate Meedhoo
| Yes | 83.93% |
| No | 14.37% |

The 2025 Addu City referendum is a public vote in Addu City, Maldives that was held on 25 October 2025. It asks residents of three island constituencies (Hulhudhoo, Meedhoo, and Feydhoo) whether to establish separate island councils for their communities, instead of remaining under the Addu City Council. This referendum follows a presidential decree and the newly enacted Public Referendum Act (Law No. 15/2025)

== Background ==
Addu City, the southernmost city of the Maldives, was declared a city in 2011 and comprises six inhabited islands. Since 2011 it has been governed by a single Addu City Council (with the Mayor and 12 members) representing all islands. Representation on the council is uneven: for example, the largest island (Hithadhoo) holds six seats, while Hulhudhoo, Meedhoo and Feydhoo hold only one or two each. Petitions had been submitted by Addu residents seeking a review of the city's composition and proposing separate councils for Hulhudhoo, Meedhoo and Feydhoo.

In September 2025, the People's Majlis (parliament) passed a new Public Referendum Act (Law No. 15/2025), which President Mohamed Muizzu later ratified. Acting on the petitions, President Muizzu convened the Cabinet on 5 October 2025 and approved holding a local referendum under the new law.

In October, President Muizzu issued Presidential Decree No. 27/2025, which declared a referendum in Hulhudhoo, Meedhoo, and Feydhoo. The decree also announced that the referendum was scheduled to be held on 24 or 25 October.

On 12 October 2025, President Muizzu issued Presidential Decree No. 31/2025 which amended the questions that the Presidential Decree No. 27/2025 had stated.

== Proposal ==
According to Presidential Decree No. 27/2025, the questions for Hulhudhoo, Meedhoo, and Feydhoo are as follows:

Hulhudhoo:

- Should a separate council be established for Addu Hulhudhoo?
- Should a combined council be established for Addu Hulhudhoo and Addu Meedhoo?

Meedhoo:

- Should a separate council be established for Addu Meedhoo?
- Should a combined council be established for Addu Hulhudhoo and Addu Meedhoo?

Feydhoo:

- Should a separate council be established for Addu Feydhoo?

This was later amended in Presidential Decree No. 31/2025 upon the recommendation of the cabinet.

The question for each island is:

"Should a separate Should a separate council be established for Addu [Hulhudhoo / Meedhoo / Feydhoo]?"

== Conduct ==
The referendum was only open to the citizens of Hulhudhoo. Meedhoo, and Feydhoo. In total, 9,576 voters are eligible: approximately 4,355 in Feydhoo, 2,874 in Hulhudhoo and 2,347 in Meedhoo. Ballot papers are printed separately for each island. Registered voters in Hulhudhoo and Meedhoo will each answer one question; Feydhoo voters will answer one question pertaining to their island.

The referendum took place on 25 October 2025 with voting hours from 8:00 AM to 04:00 PM (GMT+5).

Polling stations have been arranged as follows: five stations in Feydhoo, three in Hulhudhoo, three in Meedhoo, plus special ballot boxes in Malé (Kalaafaanu School) for Addu voters residing in the capital. After polls close, counting begins 30 minutes later. The Elections Commission expects to announce provisional results by Tuesday 28 October.

== Campaign ==
Campaigning ahead of the referendum has featured vigorous debate among local politicians, parties and community groups.

Ibrahim Didi (People's National Congress MP for South Feydhoo) and Abdulla Rahman (Independent MP for Meedhoo) had endorsed the separation, arguing that the three islands had been "orphaned" by the larger islands and deserve control of their own affairs.

Addu City Mayor Ali Nizar and Ahmed Azaan (PNC MP for Central Hithadhoo) warned that dividing the city would weaken Addu's political influence. Nizar stated that it would be hard for the independent councils to sustain themselves financially. Former president Mohamed Nasheed posted on social media that dividing the city wouldn't bring any benefit and proposed focusing on growing Addu's population. Maldivian Democratic Party chairperson Fayyaz Ismail questioned the process and raised concerns over the rushing of the referendum which may deepen voter frustration.

President Mohamed Muizzu has said that the referendum was held to honour pledges he made during his 2023 presidential campaign and has affirmed that the government has no preferred outcome. Muizzu has stated that separate councils will have full authority and have separate budgets.

Local NGO groups—Transparency Maldives, Project ThimaaVeshi, the Maldives Local Councils Association, and Zero Waste Maldives—had raised concerns over the tight deadline, unfairness, transparency, and inclusivity. They noted how the referendum was rushed and that there wasn't enough time for public consultation.

== Result ==
4,492 voters out of 9,576 registered voters (47%) had participated in the referendum. The official count released by the Elections Commission showed that Hulhudhoo and Meedhoo voted to form separate councils with 723 out of 1020 in Hulhudhoo and 847 out of 1002 in Meedhoo. Feydhoo voted against secession and chose to remain governed under the Addu City Council.

Former president Mohamed Nasheed urged the public to ensure no anger arises from the results and MDP chairperson Fayyaz Ismail congratulated Feydhoo of sticking within Addu City and hopes Hulhudhoo and Meedhoo thrive independently.

Hulhudhoo and Meedhoo celebrated by displaying fireworks after the referendum results were released.

In November 2025, President Muizzu issued a decree to reconstitute the Addu City Council, designated Hulhudhoo and Meedhoo as two distinct inhabited islands, and established Addu Meedhoo Council along with Addu Hulhudhoo Council. He had also amended the administrative jurisdictions of Addu City, Addu Hulhudhoo, and Addu Meedhoo.
