= 2020 in the Maldives =

- Decades: 2000s; 2010s; 2020s
- See also: Other events of 2020; Timeline of Maldivian history

The following lists events that happened during 2020 in the Maldives.

== Incumbents ==
- President: Ibrahim Mohamed Solih
- Vice President: Faisal Naseem
- Majlis speaker: Mohamed Nasheed
- Chief Justice: Ahmed Muthasim Adnan
- Majlis: 19th

== Events ==
=== Ongoing ===
COVID-19 pandemic in the Maldives

- 1 February – The Maldives rejoined the Commonwealth after showing evidence of functioning democratic processes and popular support.
- 7 March – The Maldives confirmed its first two cases of COVID-19, who were foreign employees at Kuredhoo Island Resort.
- 12 March – A public health emergency is declared.
- 25 August – Former Maldivian President Maumoon Abdul Gayoom tested positive for COVID-19.

== Sport ==
Association football

- 2019–20 Dhivehi Premier League
- 2020 SAFF Championship
