= 2018 in the Maldives =

- Decades: 1990s; 2000s; 2010s; 2020s
- See also: Other events of 2018; Timeline of Maldivian history

Events in the year 2018 in the Maldives.

== Incumbents ==
- President:
  - Abdulla Yameen (until 17 November)
  - Ibrahim Mohamed Solih (from 17 November)
- Vice President:
  - Abdulla Jihad (until 17 November)
  - Faisal Naseem (from 17 November)
- Majlis speaker:
  - Abdulla Maseeh Mohamed (until 1 November)
  - Qasim Ibrahim (from 1 November)
- Chief Justice: Ahmed Abdulla Didi
- Majlis: 18th

== Events ==
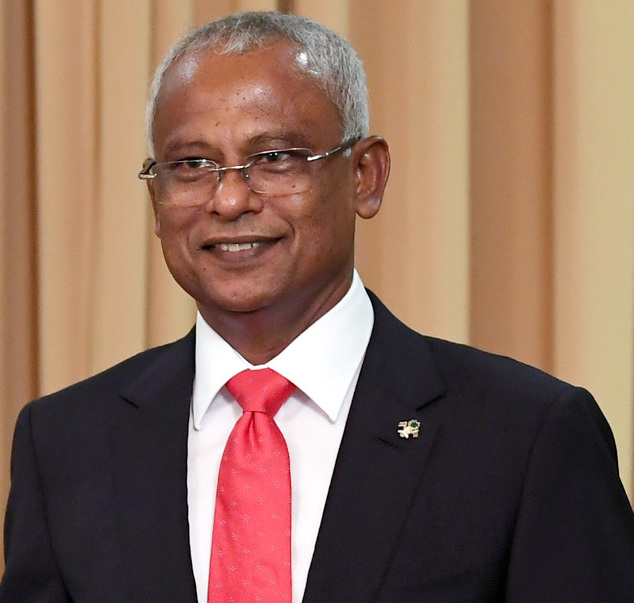
Ibrahim Mohamed Solih took over as president from 17 November

- 5 February – 2018 Maldives political crisis: president Abdulla Yameen declared a state of emergency and ordered the arrest of two judges of the Supreme Court.
- 23 September – The 2018 Maldivian presidential election was won by Ibrahim Mohamed Solih.
- 17 November – Ibrahim Mohamed Solih took over as the new president of the Maldives, succeeding Abdulla Yameen
- 19 November - President Solih announced that the Maldives is to rejoin the Commonwealth of Nations, a decision that was recommended by his Cabinet.
