= Mihaaru =

Maldivian newspaper

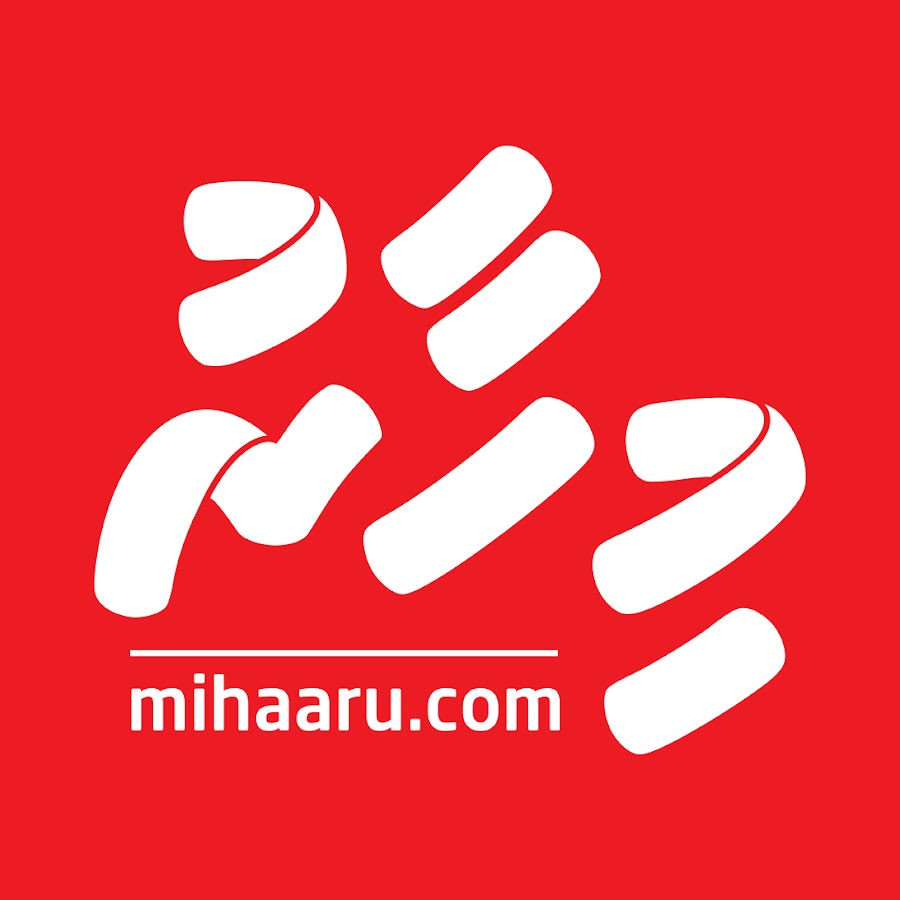
- Logo used since 2016
- News editor: Ismail Naseer
- Launched: 24 May 2016; 10 years ago
- Language: Dhivehi
- Headquarters: 7th Floor, M. Ishaan Villa, Haveeree Hingun, Maafannu, Malé, Maldives
- Country: Maldives
- Sister newspapers: The Edition; Dho Magazine
- Website: mihaaru.com

Mihaaru (Dhivehi: މިހާރު) is a Maldivian daily newspaper. The name Mihaaru translates to "Now". It is headquartered in Malé, Maldives. It is read by readers all over the country and is known to be a trusted source of information.

== History ==
Following the dispute of ownership and dissolution of Haveeru Daily, ex-Haveeru journalists formed Mihaaru to launch a revival of a trusted newspaper. Mihaaru previously faced closure threats by the Courts but the issues were sorted out at the Labour Tribunal.

In 2017, the Criminal Court banned Mihaaru's journalists from covering trials after a report was published criticising the justice system. Soon after though, Mihaaru's journalists were unbanned.

In 2019, Mihaaru was nominated for all the categories of the 2018 Maldives Journalism Awards, where it won five.

In 2022, five journalists received awards from the Maldives Journalism Awards. In June of the same year, Mihaaru's journalists were getting harassed at their office by a group of people who forcibly entered. The group accused Mihaaru of publishing a fabricated report. The International Federation of Journalists (IFJ) urged the government and the police to start an investigation into it.

In 2025, a former senior journalist at Mihaaru resigned after alleged government interference interfereing with news articles. He claimed that articles were being deleted or changed as well as not being published due to the interference.

== Sister publications ==
=== The Edition ===
Logo of The Edition (used since 2018)

The Edition (Dhivehi: ދި އެޑިޝަން) is the English edition of Mihaaru. It was first released integrated on Mihaaru's website in June 2016, but on 15 May 2018 the English edition was separated and launched as The Edition.

=== Dho?! ===
Dho?! (Dhivehi: ދޯ؟!) reports about lifestyles, music, technology, health, people and more.
