= 2012 in the Maldives =

- Decades: 1990s; 2000s; 2010s; 2020s
- See also: Other events of 2012; Timeline of Maldivian history

The following lists events that happened during 2012 in the Maldives.

== Incumbents ==
- President: Mohamed Nasheed (until 7 February), Mohamed Waheed Hassan (starting 7 February)
- Vice President: Mohamed Waheed Hassan (until 7 February), Mohamed Waheed Deen (starting 25 April)

== Events ==
=== February ===
- February 7 - President Mohamed Nasheed resigns on national television as the unrest spreads with the mutinying officers gaining control of state television. The former Vice President of the Maldives Mohamed Waheed Hassan is sworn in vowing to uphold the "rule of law".
- February 8 - The new President of the Maldives Mohammed Waheed Hassan calls for the formation of a national unity government while supporters of former President Mohamed Nasheed riot.
- February 10 - Mohamed Nasheed demands new elections and threatens protests if the new government meet the demands.

=== August ===
- August 30 - A Commonwealth-backed inquiry dismisses claims that a military coup forced Mohamed Nasheed from power.

=== October ===
- October 1 - Mohamed Nasheed fails to appear in court and departs on tour for his party. Vice-president Mohamed Waheed Deen, opening an academic conference in Malé, says a nation can achieve democracy by the teachers imparting the relevant information.
- October 2 - A member of the People’s Majlis, the parliament of the Maldives, is found stabbed to death near his home.
