= 2005 in the Maldives =

- Decades: 1980s; 1990s; 2000s; 2010s; 2020s
- See also: Other events of 2005; Timeline of Maldivian history

The following lists events that happened during 2005 in the Republic of the Maldives.

== Incumbents ==
- President: Maumoon Abdul Gayoom

== Events ==
=== May ===
- May 10 - The Maldives government releases dissident Fathimath Nisreen.

=== June ===
- June 2 - Parliament members support move to multi party democracy. Before the parliamentary debate, the Maldivian government arrested number of dissidents.
