= 2013 in the Maldives =

- Decades: 1990s; 2000s; 2010s; 2020s
- See also: Other events of 2013; Timeline of Maldivian history

The following lists events that happened during 2013 in the Maldives.

== Incumbents ==
- President: Mohamed Waheed Hassan (until 17 November), Abdulla Yameen (starting 17 November)
- Vice President: Mohamed Waheed Deen (until 10 November), Mohamed Jameel Ahmed (starting 10 November)

== Events ==
=== September ===
- September 7 - Voters in the Maldives go to the polls for a presidential election with no candidate achieving an outright majority with a runoff election to be held on September 28.

=== October ===
- October 22 - The Maldives sets a new date for a presidential election to be held on November 9.

=== November ===
- November 9 - Voters in the Maldives go to the polls for the second round of a presidential election.
- November 16 - Voters in the Maldives go to the polls for a presidential election with Abdulla Yameen winning the election with 51.3% of the vote.
- November 17 - Abdulla Yameen is sworn in as the President of the Maldives following yesterday's election victory.
