= 2021 in the Maldives =

- Decades: 2000s; 2010s; 2020s
- See also: Other events of 2021; Timeline of Maldivian history

The following lists events that happened during 2021 in the Maldives.

== Incumbents ==
- President: Ibrahim Mohamed Solih
- Vice President: Faisal Naseem
- Majlis speaker: Mohamed Nasheed
- Chief Justice: Ahmed Muthasim Adnan
- Majlis: 19th

== Events ==
=== Ongoing ===
- COVID-19 pandemic in the Maldives: On the 1st of February, the government launched a vaccination campaign for all Maldivians to become vaccinated against COVID-19. In March, the Tourism Minister, Abdulla Mausoom, announced the unique 'Vaccine Tourism' strategy, whereby tourists would come to the country to get their first vaccination, stay for three or four weeks, after which the second dose could be administered. The tourism strategy was referred to as the "3V Campaign" - Visit, Vaccinate, and Vacation.
- Freedom House's 'Freedom in the World Report' scored Maldives a 40/100 in 2021, deeming it 'partly free'. It scored 21/60 for Civil Liberties and 19/40 for Political Rights.

=== May ===
- 6 May - Attempted assassination of Mohamed Nasheed
- Japan announced a $4.7 million grant to be invested in Maldives' border security.

=== December ===
- The government passed a third amendment to the Anti-Terrorism Act (ATA), which would grant Maldives Police Services (MPS) more powers, such as the arrest and holding of suspects for ATA crimes for 48 hours, and without a warrant.

== Sport ==
Association football

- 2020–21 Dhivehi Premier League
- 2022 SAFF U-19 Championship
- 2021 SAFF Championship

Other sports

- Maldives at the 2020 Summer Olympics
- Maldives at the 2020 Summer Paralympics
