= 2022 in the Maldives =

- Decades: 2000s; 2010s; 2020s
- See also: Other events of 2022; Timeline of Maldivian history

The following lists events that happened during 2022 in the Maldives.

== Incumbents ==
- President: Ibrahim Mohamed Solih
- Vice President: Faisal Naseem
- Majlis speaker: Mohamed Nasheed
- Chief Justice: Ahmed Muthasim Adnan
- Majlis: 19th

== Events ==
=== Ongoing ===
- COVID-19 pandemic in the Maldives

=== February ===
- 2 February – The Madivaru Airport is opened.
- Australia establishes a permanent diplomatic presence in the Maldives, agreeing to collaborate on climate change, Indian Ocean security, and drug rehabilitation.

=== March ===
- 2 March – The Maldives vote on a United Nations resolution condemning Russia for its invasion of Ukraine.
- 12 March – The Maldives sign an agreement with the United States Agency for International Development (USAID) to strengthen economic and democratic governance and support sustainable development.

=== April ===
- President Ibrahim Solih issues a decree banning the “India Out” campaign, citing national security concerns.

=== May ===
- Civil society activists petition the High Court to repeal provisions of the Freedom of Assembly Act, which restricts protests to police-approved areas.

=== June ===
- 1 June – The Maldivian government bans the production, import, and consumption of certain single-use plastics as part of its national waste management strategy.
- Islamist extremists disrupt a 150-person International Yoga Day event in Male; authorities arrested six people.
- The Maldivian parliament enacts the Evidence Act, allowing courts to compel journalists and media outlets to reveal sources, causing journalists to raise concerns about press freedom.

=== July ===
- 15-24 July – The Maldives competes at the 2022 World Athletics Championships in Eugene, Oregon with one athlete, sprinter Hassan Saaid, participating in the men’s 100 metres.
- 28 July – The Maldives competes at the 2022 Commonwealth Games in Birmingham, marking its first appearance since rejoining the Commonwealth. 24 athletes (11 men, 13 women) take part, with no medals won.
- The Adhaalath Party declares yoga forbidden for Muslims in the Maldives.
- Police arrest three men for allegedly engaging in consensual same-sex relations with a Bangladeshi national.

=== August ===
- President Ibrahim Solih visits New Delhi, reaffirming the “India First” policy and support for the Greater Male Connectivity Project.

=== September ===
- 15 September – Ahmed Sattar is sentenced to three months and 26 days of home confinement for engaging in homosexual relations.
- The UN Working Group on discrimination against women and girls visits the Maldives to assess progress on gender equality, praising commitments but noting persistent societal and legal barriers.

=== October ===
- 3 October – President Ibrahim Solih declares the day a government holiday to mark the first National Tourism Day, coinciding with the 50th anniversary of tourism in the Maldives.
- 17-24 October – The Maldives hosts an international mission of the Capacity for Disaster Reduction Initiative (CADRI), with participation from the Asian and Pacific Centre for the Development of Disaster Information Management (APDIM).
- 18 October – President Ibrahim Solih inaugurates the Maldives International Challenge 2022 badminton tournament with players from 25 countries.

=== November ===
- 5-7 November – Vice President Faisal Naseem attends the COP27 in Sharm El-Sheikh, South Sinai, delivering the Maldives’ national statement and highlighting the country’s climate action plans, including its commitment to net zero emissions by 2030.
- President Ibrahim Solih ratifies the Associations Act, introducing NGO financial disclosure requirements and limited state funding.

=== December ===
- 25 December – Former President Abdulla Yameen is convicted of money laundering and bribery and sentenced to 11 years in prison.
