= Parliamentary elections in the Maldives =

Election for the People's Majlis

The parliamentary elections in the Maldives determine the composition of the People's Majlis (parliament) for the next five years.

== Eligibility ==
The Parliamentary Elections Act requires that parliament candidates be Maldives citizens who are not citizens of any other country, adhere to a Sunni school of Islam, be at least eighteen years of age, and be of sound mind.

Candidates are disqualified if they have a decreed debt they are neglecting to pay off, have been convicted of a criminal offense for which they are serving a sentence of more than twelve months, have served over twelve months for a criminal offense without three years having lapsed since their release or pardon, or are a member of the Judiciary.

== Runoff elections ==
During the parliamentary elections, if an electoral constituency has more than one candidate that got majority votes, a runoff election is held within fifteen days the official results of the election has been announced by the Elections Commission (EC).

== Procedure ==
=== Nomination of candidates ===
Candidates can either choose to run as independent or be nominated by a political party. Political parties hold primaries in each constituency and whoever gets the popular vote of that primary represents the party for that constituency in the election.

Candidates for the parliamentary elections must pay a deposit of Rf. 5,000, and if they're independent, along with the deposit they have to submit a statement signed by fifty adults who are above 18 from the constituency they're running for to show they support the candidate. The statement must have their full name, identity card number, permanent address must be included.

== See also ==
- Elections in the Maldives
