= Censorship in the Maldives =

The Maldives ranks from the middle to the top third of international indexes of press freedom, indicating a large degree of freedom. Media discussion of religion, however, remains tightly restricted.

== Indexes ==
In the 2011 Freedom House Freedom of the Press annual report, the Maldives scores a 50, or "partly free". In 2024, Reporters Without Borders ranked the Maldives as having the 106th freest press in the world (of 180 ranked nations).

== Ismail Khilath Rasheed controversy ==
In November 2011, the blog of journalist Ismail Khilath Rasheed was shut down by Communications Authority of the Maldives (CAM) on the order of the Ministry of Islamic Affairs, on the grounds that the site contained "anti-Islamic material". Rasheed, a self-professed Sufi Muslim, had argued for greater religious tolerance. The blog closing was condemned by Reporters Without Borders and UN High Commissioner for Human Rights Navanethem Pillay as representing a rise in religious intolerance.

When Rasheed organized a rally in favor of greater religious freedom on 10 December, the rally was attacked and Rasheed's skull fractured. He was subsequently arrested at the urging of the orthodox Sunni Adhaalath Party, which also organized a counter-demonstration on 23 December to protect Islam. Rasheed was released on 10 January following protests by groups such as Amnesty International (which named him a prisoner of conscience) and Reporters Without Borders on his behalf.

== Anti-government news websites blocked ==
On 22 December 2023, CAM blocked 2 anti-government news websites which caused major rights groups in the archipelago to condemn the blocking. They were unblocked 4 days later.

== See also ==
- Maldives Media and Broadcasting Regulation Law
