= Corruption (disambiguation) =

Corruption is the abuse of power for personal gain.

Corruption may also refer to:

== Entertainment ==
- Corruption (1933 film), an American crime film
- Corruption (1963 film), an Italian drama film
- Corruption (1968 film), a British horror film
- Corruption (1988 video game), a 1988 adventure game
- Metroid Prime 3: Corruption, a 2007 action-adventure game
- Corruption (play), a play by J. T. Rogers
- "Corruption" (Star Wars: The Clone Wars)
- "Corruption", a song by Northlane from Discoveries, 2011
- "Corruption", a song by Within the Ruins from Phenomena II, 2024
- La Bonne, an Italian drama film released as The Corruption in English

== Other ==
- Corruption (linguistics), the idea that language change constitutes a degradation in quality
- Data corruption, errors in computer data
- A copying error in textual criticism

== See also ==
- Corrupt (disambiguation)
- Corruptor (disambiguation)
- Kuruption!, an album by Kurupt
