= Pre-service teacher education =

Education and training provided to student teachers before they undertake teaching

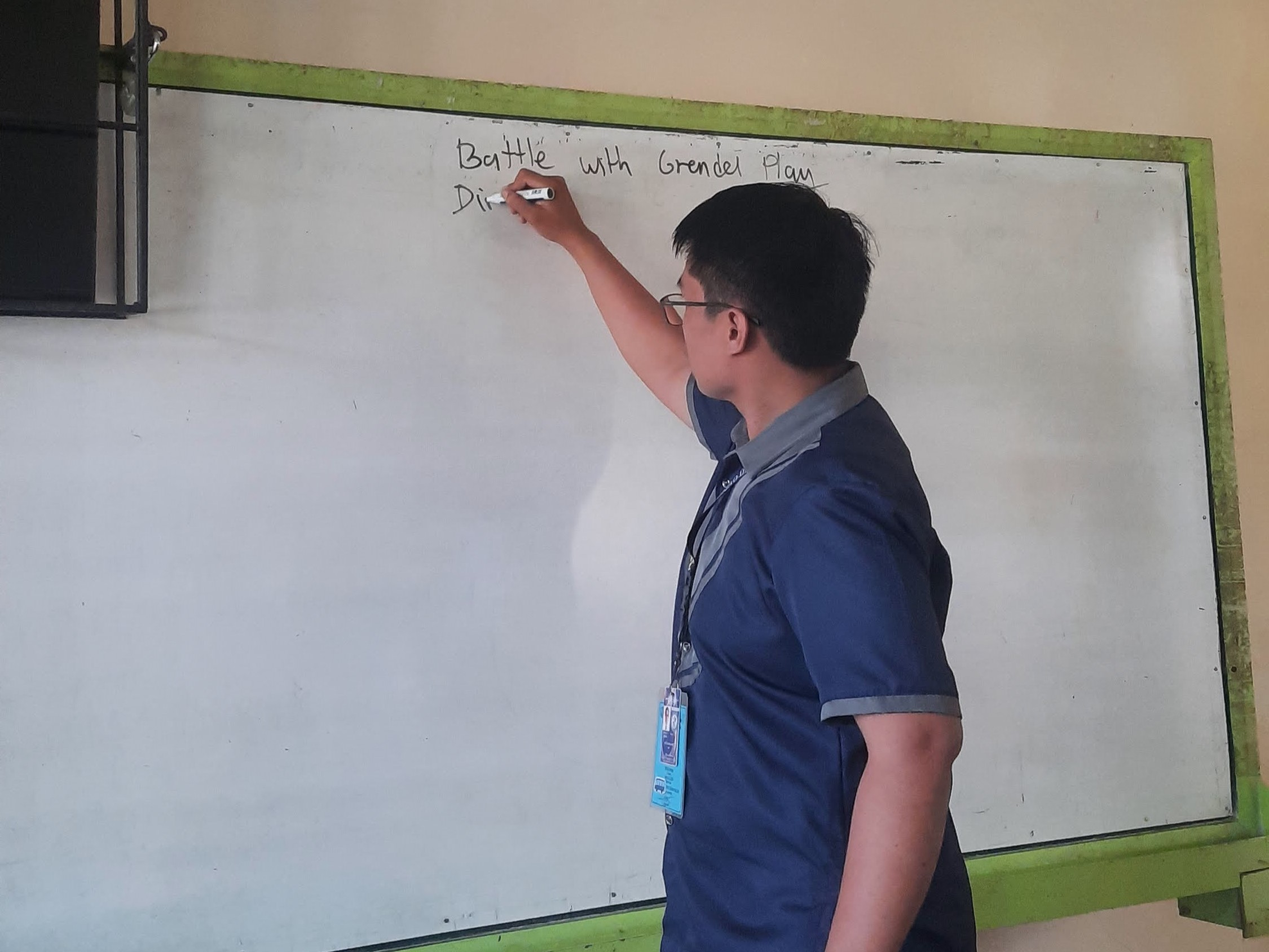
A pre-service teacher

Pre-service teacher education is the education and training provided to student teachers before they have undertaken any teaching.

In contrast, in-service teacher education provides learning opportunities for practicing teachers.

== Requirements for acceptance to pre-service programs ==
Before entering into a pre-service education program, most students will have obtained a previous academic degree, either a general or honours, in a subject of their choice, (e.g. English, math, science, religion). The alternative to this is that students may work simultaneously on an undergraduate bachelor's degree and a pre-service education program. The latter route incorporates education courses throughout the program's 4 or 5 years, and culminates in a final year of specific pre-service training. Students who complete a bachelor's degree before returning to a university to complete the pre-service education program are in a consecutive pre-service program, while students who complete their pre-service training at the same time as their undergraduate degree are in a concurrent program.

=== Australia ===
In Australia, pre-service teachers generally undergo an online course for qualification into pre-service teacher education. these courses are designed to enhance teachers' knowledge, skills and confidence.

=== United Kingdom ===
In the United Kingdom, a teaching qualification in further education (TQFE) is offered at many universities and can be used as a qualification in pre-service teacher education.

=== United States ===
In the US, students are often required to take a test prior to acceptance into an accredited program, and/or upon graduation in order to earn certification. Commonly, the PRAXIS I or PRAXIS II are required for this purpose. Common topics include classroom management, lesson plans, and professional development. There are a number of places to study pre service teacher education in the US.

== Foundational thinking ==
The practical nature of pre-service education training programs aligns with American philosopher John Dewey's theory of experience. In his book Experience and Education Dewey prescribes that learning must be based upon the actual life experiences of an individual that are interactive, experimental, and purposive in nature. Donald Schon expanded upon Dewey's model by focusing further upon the importance of reflective practice in the learning process. Schon was a proponent of using reflection in teacher education and other professions to guide learning through reflection on past experiences to guide future learning and practice, as evidenced in his 1996 work, Educating the reflective practitioner: Toward a new design for teaching and learning in the professions.

== Major foci ==
Provincial and state territories across North America vary greatly in population, language, demographics, geography and other social factors. As such, the universities and colleges that offer pre-service education recognize unique factors about the student populations they serve, and in response have created unique programs to meet those needs. That being said, there are two major components that are common to pre-service education programs.

=== Practicum ===
A major focus in the pre-service education program is the practicum – the pre-service teacher is placed within a school setting (either elementary, or senior) and shadows an experienced teacher. All faculties of education in Canada include a practicum component in their pre-service programs. The pre-service teacher will be given opportunities to develop skills through observing their associate teacher, creating lesson plans, teaching lessons and experiential learning about classroom management.

=== Course work ===
To complement the practicum, pre-service programs offer academic based courses, designed to expose teacher candidates to collaborative inquiry, current research, educational philosophy, theory, pedagogy and practical resources to provide a foundation for their work as educators. This, combined with the experience gained through the practicum, prepare the next generation of teachers for the challenges of the classroom.

== Pre-service graduate challenges ==
After completing a pre-service program, a graduate must apply for certification to be hired by a public school board. This is granted by a provincial or state governing authority. Not all pre-service programs are designed the same, and a certificate obtained in one country may not be recognized in another. Within the US, state-to-state reciprocity is limited. In Canada, jurisdictional requirements for teacher education differs provincially, and each province has a designated authority responsible for the evaluation, certification and provision of teacher qualifications. It is significantly more challenging to receive certification in a state or province other than that in which the teacher attended their pre-service program. This makes it difficult for pre-service graduates to find employment outside of the state or province in which they received their training.

== See also ==
- Inservice program
