= Anti-Corruption Commission of Namibia =

The Anti-Corruption Commission of Namibia (ACC) is an agency of the executive branch of the Government of Namibia. It was established under section 2 of the Anti-Corruption Act 8 of 2003 and inaugurated on 1 February 2006 by president Hifikepunye Pohamba. The aim of the commission is to fight against corruption.

Corruption is high in Namibia, i.e. unofficial but necessary bribe for receiving work permit in Namibia Investment Centre (as they are responsible for such decisions) is about N$10000. The Anti-Corruption Act is Namibia's primary anti-corruption law, covering passive bribery, active bribery, attempted corruption, extortion and bribing a foreign public official.

== Management ==
The current management consists of the Director-General Paulus K. Noa, Deputy Director-General Erna Van Der Merwe and Executive Director Hannu H. Shipena.
