= 2026 Maldivian local elections =

Fifth local council elections and Second Women's Development Committee elections

2026 Maldives local elections
- 4 April 2026
- All local councils and Women’s Development Committees
- Turnout: 73%
Party	Vote %	Seats won	+/–
MDP	42.9%	238	−162
PNC	38.9%	216	−109
Independent	13.4%	74	−99
MDA	1.8%	10	−6
JP	0.2%	1	−25
AP	0.2%	1	−12
This lists parties that won seats. See the complete results below.
Results by atolls

The fifth Maldivian Local Council elections took place on April 4, 2026 (with run-offs from some islands on April 18, 2026), alongside the Women’s Development Committee (WDC) elections and a constitutional referendum on aligning presidential and parliamentary elections. The Elections Commission rolled out 226 constituencies across the country for this cycle, and election day saw a record 73% turnout for a local council vote. The ruling People’s National Congress took the council seats overall, but the opposition Maldivian Democratic Party swept all five city mayor races and won majorities in each city council and council seats. Voters also decisively rejected the referendum. After the results, President Mohamed Muizzu congratulated the winners and acknowledged the outcome as the people’s will, with many seeing the result as a verdict on the government’s performance and a boost for the opposition.

== Background ==
In the Maldives, local councils handle governance at both island and city levels. Under the Decentralisation Act, each inhabited island and city ward elects a five-member council consisting of a president, one reserved female member, and three ordinary members, while atoll councils oversee the islands within each atoll. In 2026, elections for island, atoll, and city councils were all held on the same day. For the first time, WDC president positions—one per island or city—were decided by direct vote. These elections came alongside major changes, as a constitutional amendment abolished elected atoll councils effective 27 May 2026, shifting their powers to the central Local Government Authority. That year, 38 international observers, including 14 representatives from seven countries and diplomats from various embassies in the Maldives, monitored the process at the ECM’s invitation.

The main contenders were the pro-government People’s National Congress (successor to the Progressive Party of Maldives) and the opposition Maldivian Democratic Party. Others in the race included the People’s National Front (led by former President Abdulla Yameen), the Maldives Development Alliance, Adhaalath Party, and several independents.

Notable candidates included incumbent Malé Mayor Adam Azim (MDP), retired Major General Moosa Ali Jaleel (PNC’s choice for Malé mayor), and other current MDP mayors. The campaigns centered on local governance and a simultaneous referendum on merging presidential and parliamentary elections, which the MDP opposed. No widely publicized opinion polls were available for the local races.

== Electoral system ==
Elections Commission rules assigned each island or city ward as a single-member constituency for each council seat. In each constituency, separate ballots were cast for:

- Local Council President.
- The reserved female member.
- Ordinary council members.

Councils in cities like Malé and Addu City have eleven seats (10 councillors plus the mayor) distributed by ward. The constitutional gender quota reserved one of every three council seats for women. The electorate numbered about 294,937 across 226 constituencies.

WDC elections used similar island-based constituencies (one seat per island or city ward).

== Results ==
Voter turnout was officially reported at 73%. In the preliminary results for local councils (island, atoll, and city combined), the PNC won 216 seats, the MDP secured 238, and independents took 72, with the rest going to other parties. This gave the MDP a narrow overall majority of local-level seats, boosted by numerous uncontested races and strong pluralities in urban areas, while the PNC faced defeat.

Party	Votes	%
Maldivian Democratic Party	246,319	42.9
People's National Congress	214,116	38.9
Independent	87,550	13.0
Maldives Development Alliance	7,572	1.8
Jumhooree Party	2,540	0.2
Adhaalath Party	718	0.2

== Reactions ==
President Muizzu quickly accepted the election results, congratulating the winners in an April 5 social media post and pledging to listen to the “aspirations and needs of the Maldivian people” when shaping future policies. MDP leaders celebrated the outcome as proof of public discontent with the government, with supporters gathering in Malé—especially along the Artificial Beach promenade—to mark the victory. Local and International media called it a “stunning defeat” for the ruling party. Analysts described the 2026 local election as a turning point, signaling a rejection of the administration’s agenda and giving the opposition momentum ahead of national polls. It was also the first vote under new rules, including the upcoming abolition of atoll councils and the move to make WDC chairs full-time elected roles. Despite the complexity of the triple-vote system, turnout was high, showing strong public interest in local governance, and the government has signaled it will pursue reforms in response.
