= 2028 Maldivian presidential election =

14th quinquennial presidential election in the Maldives

- September 2028
President before election
Mohamed Muizzu
PNC
Elected President
TBD

Presidential elections are scheduled to be held in the Maldives in September 2028. Voters will elect a president and vice president for a five-year term. Incumbent president and leader of the People's National Congress, Mohamed Muizzu, is eligible for a second term.

== Electoral system ==
The president is elected using the two-round system; if no candidate receives a majority of the vote in the first round, a second round is held with just the top two candidates.

In November 2024, President Muizzu announced plans to hold a referendum on replacing the two-round system with instant runoff voting, allowing the elections to be held in a single round of voting. He also proposed holding the presidential and parliamentary elections on the same day. A campaign was launched by government officials and supporters to propose preferential voting. Opposition parties allege it as a plot to meddle with the election boxes and to rig the votes.

== Candidates ==
=== People's National Congress ===
In November 2024, Abdul Raheem Abdulla, chairman of the People's National Congress (PNC), stated that Muizzu would be automatically selected as the party's nominee for the 2028 elections rather than holding party primaries to determine the candidate. In 2026, the PNC Senate awarded him the party ticket without a primary.

=== Maldivian Democratic Party ===
Maldivian Democratic Party (MDP) chair Fayyaz Ismail announced he would enter the party's primary, while MDP's President, Abdulla Shahid, also announced his intention to run. South Hulhumalé MP Ahmed Shamheed announced in September 2026 that he would be running in the primary. In October 2026, former Vice President Faisal Naseem announced he would be contesting in the primary, with Malé City Mayor Adam Azim as his running mate.

=== People's National Front ===
Former president Abdulla Yameen, leader of the People's National Front (PNF) has also stated he would run for the presidency, but stated he would step aside if a credible candidate who has the best interest of the country emerges.
