= Adhadhu =

Maldives news platform

- Logo used since 2021
- Editor-in-chief: Hussain Fiyaz Moosa
- Associate editor: Hassan Mohamed & Azzam Alifulhu
- Founded: 22 February 2021; 5 years ago
- Language: Dhivehi and English
- Headquarters: 4th floor, Maaram, Henveiru, Malé, Maldives
- Website: adhadhu.com

Adhadhu is an online news website based in Malé, Maldives. Adhadhu's journalists has received many awards from the Maldives Media Council.

== History ==
Adhadhu was registered with the Ministry of Home Affairs on 22 February 2021.

On 20 March 2023, Editor-in-chief Hussain Fiyaz Moosa was sent text messages which contained death threats after publishing an article about organised crime and religious extremism.

In 2024, Adhadhu won the politics, sports, video documentary, investigative journalism (audio and video) categories at the Journalism Awards.

On 16 March 2025, Adhadhu filed a police complaint after president Mohamed Muizzu called Adhadhu's CEO Hussain Fiyaz Moosa and threatened him. This was condemned by the Maldives Journalists Association and Transparency Maldives.

On 27 April 2026, the Serious and Organised Crime Department raided Adhadhu's offices in Malé, seizing journalists' laptops and hard drives. A travel ban was subsequently issued on Hussain Fiyaz Moosa and managing editor Hassan Mohamed and charged them with qazf, a false accusation of adultery under Islamic law.

== Controversies ==
Adhadhu produced a documentary called "Skeelan", which is about president Mohamed Muizzu's stepmother. The documentary has been based on a false narrative according to multiple sources that came in defence of Muizzu. The documentary says that Skeelan was deported and blacklisted from the Maldives and that Muizzu's family had cut ties with her. Muizzu denied all the allegations.

Adhadhu produced a documentary called "Bailakka", where it shows that Congress MPs of the People's Majlis were getting monthly payouts by Mohamed Muizzu. The government and the MPs denied this and threatened legal action and the President's Office filed a complaint with the Maldives Media Council about the documentary.

On 29 March 2026, Adhadhu released "Aisha", revealing a woman whose name has been redacted who had an alleged affair with President Mohamed Muizzu. On 10 May, the Maldivian Criminal Court issued a gag order prohibiting public discussion of the documentary. On 12 May, Adhadhu journalists Leevan Ali Naseer and Mohamed Shahzan were sentenced to 10 and 15 days in prison respectively, as well as fines of 26, 000 MVR, for reporting on the gag order.
