= Abdul Ghanee Mohamed =

Chief Justice of the Maldives since 2025

- ޢަބްދުލްޣަނީ މުޙައްމަދު
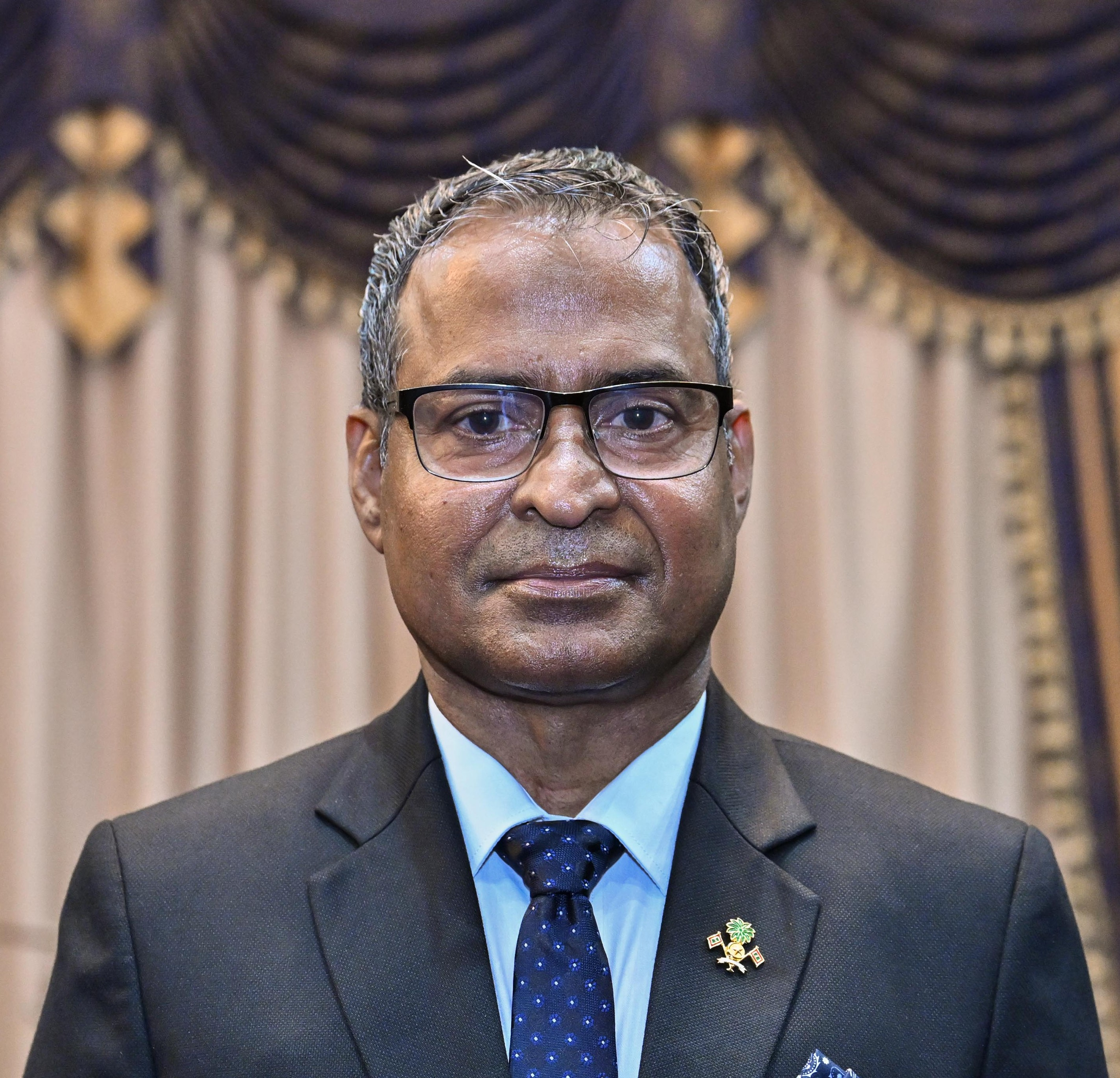
- Ghanee in 2025

6th Chief Justice of the Maldives
- Incumbent
- Assumed office 6 August 2025
- President: Mohamed Muizzu
- Preceded by: Ahmed Muthasim Adnan

Justice of the Supreme Court of the Maldives
- In office 28 June 2018 – 4 December 2019
- President: Ibrahim Mohamed Solih

Judge of the High Court of the Maldives
- In office 14 March 2004 – 28 June 2018
- President: Maumoon Abdul Gayoom; Mohamed Nasheed; Mohamed Waheed Hassan; Abdulla Yameen

President of the Judicial Service Commission
- In office 27 July 2009 – 21 January 2010
- Preceded by: Hassan Afeeg
- Succeeded by: Mujthaz Fahmy

Judge of the Civil Court of the Maldives
- In office 10 July 2000 – 14 March 2004
- President: Maumoon Abdul Gayoom

Personal details
- Born: Henveiru, Malé, Maldives

Abdul Ghanee Mohamed (Dhivehi: ޢަބްދުލްޣަނީ މުޙައްމަދު) is a Maldivian lawyer and judge who is currently serving as the sixth Chief Justice of the Maldives since 2025. He previously served as a judge of the Supreme Court of the Maldives from 2018 to 2019 and a judge of the High Court of the Maldives from 2004 to 2018.

== Education ==
He has Bachelor of Laws and Islamic Jurisprudence from Al-Azhar University, a master's degree in Islamic Judicial Sciences and Shariah Policy and a Postgraduate Diploma in Teaching from the Islamic University of Maldives.

== Career ==
Ghani served a judge on the Civil Court from 10 July 2000 to 14 March 2004, later on serving as a judge of the High Court from 14 March 2004 to 28 June 2018. He also served as the Chief Judge of the High Court from 21 September 2008 to 26 April 2011. From 27 July 2009 to 21 January 2010 he served as the president of the Judicial Service Commission (JSC).

In 2018, he was nominated by President Abdulla Yameen as a justice of the Supreme Court of the Maldives. He was later appointed by Yameen on 28 June 2018. In 2019, Ghanee faced multiple corruption allegations from the JSC and ethical misconduct. He was suspended by the JSC and submitted a motion to the People's Majlis to remove him as a justice of the Supreme Court. The People's Majlis's Judiciary Committee approved his dismissal motion and the whole Majlis voted to remove him with 64 in favour. He was also under investigation by the Anti-Corruption Commission stemming from a 2012 complaint.

In 2024, he was appointed by President Mohamed Muizzu as a member of the Tax Appeal Tribunal, later on becoming the president.

In 2025, President Mohamed Muizzu recommended Ghanee for the post of Chief Justice. The People's Majlis's Judiciary Committee approved Ghanee's appointment and the entire Majlis approved Ghanee with a unanimous vote. He was later appointed as the Chief Justice by Muizzu on 6 August 2025.
