= Elections Commission (Maldives) =

Government agency in the Maldives

- އިލެކްޝަންސް ކޮމިޝަން

Agency overview
- Formed: 7 August 2008
- Headquarters: Ports Complex, 5th Floor, Henveiru, Malé, Maldives
- Website: elections.gov.mv

The Elections Commission (Dhivehi: އިލެކްޝަންސް ކޮމިޝަން, EC or ECM) is a commission set up to conduct, manage, supervise, and facilitate all elections and public referendums, to ensure the proper exercise of the right to vote, and to ensure that all elections and public referendums are conducted freely and fairly, without intimidation, aggression, undue influence or corruption and to prepare, maintain, and update electoral rolls, and to make all arrangements for holding elections and public referendums.

== History ==
The Elections Commission was established on 7 August 2008 in accordance with the Constitution of the Maldives as an independent and impartial institution to conduct and supervise all state elections and public referendums as well as to monitor the regulatory framework pertaining to the functioning of political parties. Under the Elections Commission Act (2008) 5 members are appointed by the president for a 5-year term with approval by People’s Majlis.

Prior to the establishment of the Elections Commission, all elections were conducted by the Commissioner of Elections office which functioned under the Ministry of Home Affairs, and later under The President's Office and the Commissioner was appointed by the President.

Since its inception, the Elections Commission of Maldives has successfully carried out an independent, transparent, free and fair elections devoid of outside influences with multiple candidates with the 2008 presidential elections, the parliamentary elections of 2009 and the local council elections of 2011 which had the largest number of candidates taking part to date. The election processes were carried out according to the international standard accepted by the international community.

=== Responsibilities ===
- To conduct, manage, supervise, and facilitate all elections and public referendums, to ensure the proper exercise of the right to vote, and to ensure that all elections and public referendums are conducted freely and fairly, without intimidation, aggression, undue influence or corruption.
- To prepare, maintain, and update electoral rolls, and to make all arrangements for holding elections and public referendums.
- To hold and declare the results of those elections and public referendums within periods prescribed by law.
- To compile the register of voters in each constituency, to revise it at such periods as shall be determined by law and to provide for publication of the register in the Government Gazette.
- To fix, vary, demarcate and continuously review the boundaries and names of constituencies or voting units in all elections in accordance with principles specified by law and to provide for publication of any amendments in the Government Gazette.
- To register political parties, and to perform those actions relating to political parties as specified by law.
- To educate and create awareness among the general public on the electoral process and its purpose.
- Formulate electoral policies for all elections, public referendums and those elections assigned to the Elections Commission by the Constitution and law.
- Conduct training for employees and delegates.
- Plan and implement electoral logistics and delivery of equipment.
- Accredit domestic and international observers.
- Determine polling stations for elections and public referendums; and give timely notice to the landlord or person in charge in case of failure to corporate with the Elections Commission, and discharge its duties.
- Make all arrangements for Maldivian people residing abroad to cast vote.
- Publish a report for public inspection after each election and public referendum as specified by law.
- Perform such additional functions as may be prescribed by the Constitution and law.
