= Inset day =

School day where teachers train and work, and students do not attend

In education, an inset day (an abbreviation of in-service training day; alternatively INSET day) is a school day on which teaching sessions are not conducted and students do not attend school, but teachers are required to attend for in-service training or to complete administrative tasks. Inset days allow teachers to catch up on work (such as marking exams or report cards), train on new technology, or learn new methods of teaching. Inset days are common in Commonwealth countries, predominantly the United Kingdom and Canada, and also Ireland.

An inset day may also be known as a PD day (professional development day; alternatively pro-D day), PA day (professional activity day), Ped Day (pedagogical day), TD day (teacher development day), teacher training day, teacher's workshop, workshop day, Baker day, staff development day, school development day, or inservice day.

== History ==
In the UK, inset days were introduced in 1988 by Kenneth Baker, then the Secretary of State for Education, as part of a series of reforms that included the introduction of the National Curriculum for England. Baker introduced the requirement for teachers to attend training in addition to the 190 days previously required, leading to the name Baker days.

== Attendance ==
=== United Kingdom ===
In the UK, teachers in state schools are required to undertake five inset days in addition to the 190 teaching days children are required to be in school. The days are determined by the local education authority, although academy and free schools have the freedom to set their own dates.

=== Canada ===
In Canada, the number of inset days varies between each province and individual school board. The Canadian territories are not known to have inset days.

Province or territory	Inset days per school year (2022–2023)	Notes and exceptions
Ontario	3–7	The Ministry of Education mandates a minimum of 3 inset days and a maximum of 7; most school boards choose to schedule the maximum of 7.
Quebec	7–12	Some school boards, such as the Lester B. Pearson School Board, have as many as 19 inset days, 7 of which are when school is not in session.
British Columbia	6	Individual school boards decide the number of inset days; most school boards have 6.
Alberta	5–13	Individual school boards decide the number of inset days. For example, Edmonton Public Schools schedules 8, while the Calgary Board of Education schedules 12, 4 of which are outside the school year.
Nova Scotia	2–8	Though the maximum inset days is 8, individual school boards choose how many they have. Many school boards have "half-PD days", most commonly for parent–teacher conferences.
Manitoba	9	2 inset days are outside the school year.
Saskatchewan	3–15	Strongly varies between school board. For instance, the Sun West School Division has 15 inset days (7 outside the school year), while the Chinook School Division has 3.
Newfoundland and Labrador	7	Decided by the Newfoundland and Labrador Teachers' Association.
Prince Edward Island	6	Of the 6 inset days, 1 is outside the school year.
New Brunswick	2	Some school boards have additional half-days; the Anglophone West School District, for example, has 2 full inset days and 4 additional half-days.

=== Australia ===
In Australia it is either known as school development days or staff development days where teaching staff prepare for the school term and it usually is the first day of school term. This could involve professional learning or doing administrative tasks.

== Criticism ==
Parents have to arrange childcare or schedules to account for inset days. This can cause disruptions and burdens on parents who do not have easy access to childcare and flexible schedules. Teachers who are parents themselves may have greater problems than other working parents since they are unable to take inset days off to look after their own children when an inset day is scheduled at their children's school. In Canada, some YMCAs and businesses offer "PA day camps" to help parents make alternative plans.

It has been suggested that inset days lead to greater truancy, especially when they are scheduled near the end of the school year for teachers to mark report cards and final exams, as students may believe their marks and attendance after those inset days no longer matter.

== See also ==
- Skip Day
