= Maldives Journalists Association =

Voluntary association advocating for press freedom in the Maldives

- މޯލްޑިވްސް ޖާނަލިސްޓްސް އެސޯސިއޭޝަން
- Official logo
- Formation: 1 April 2009; 17 years ago
- Headquarters: Minha, 4A, Karankaa Magu, Henveiru, Malé, Maldives
- President: Ali Rifshan
- Vice President: Mohamed Yamin
- Affiliations: International Federation of Journalists
- Website: mja.mv

Maldives Journalists Association (Dhivehi: މޯލްޑިވްސް ޖާނަލިސްޓްސް އެސޯސިއޭޝަން, romanized: moaldivs jaanalists esoasieyshan) is a voluntary association that represents Maldivian journalists and news outlets as well as advocating for press freedom in the Maldives.

== History ==
The association was formed on 1 April 2009. The association is part of the International Federation of Journalists (IFJ).

The association is one of the leading voices to advocate for the rights and protection of journalists, and to promote cooperation and professionalism among journalists.

Following a split of membership of the association, it collapsed in 2014, which led IFJ and other media networks to campaign to revive the association.

A three-member transitional committee later organized the Extraordinary General Meeting, which revived the association.

After many years of inactivity from the association, it held its latest Extraordinary General Meeting, electing Mohamed Hamdhoon and Ali Rifshan as President and Vice President respectively. The association elected its latest executive committee members in 2022, replacing Mohamed Hamdhoon with Ali Rifshan as President, and Mohamed Yamin as Vice President.
