= List of chief justices of the Maldives =

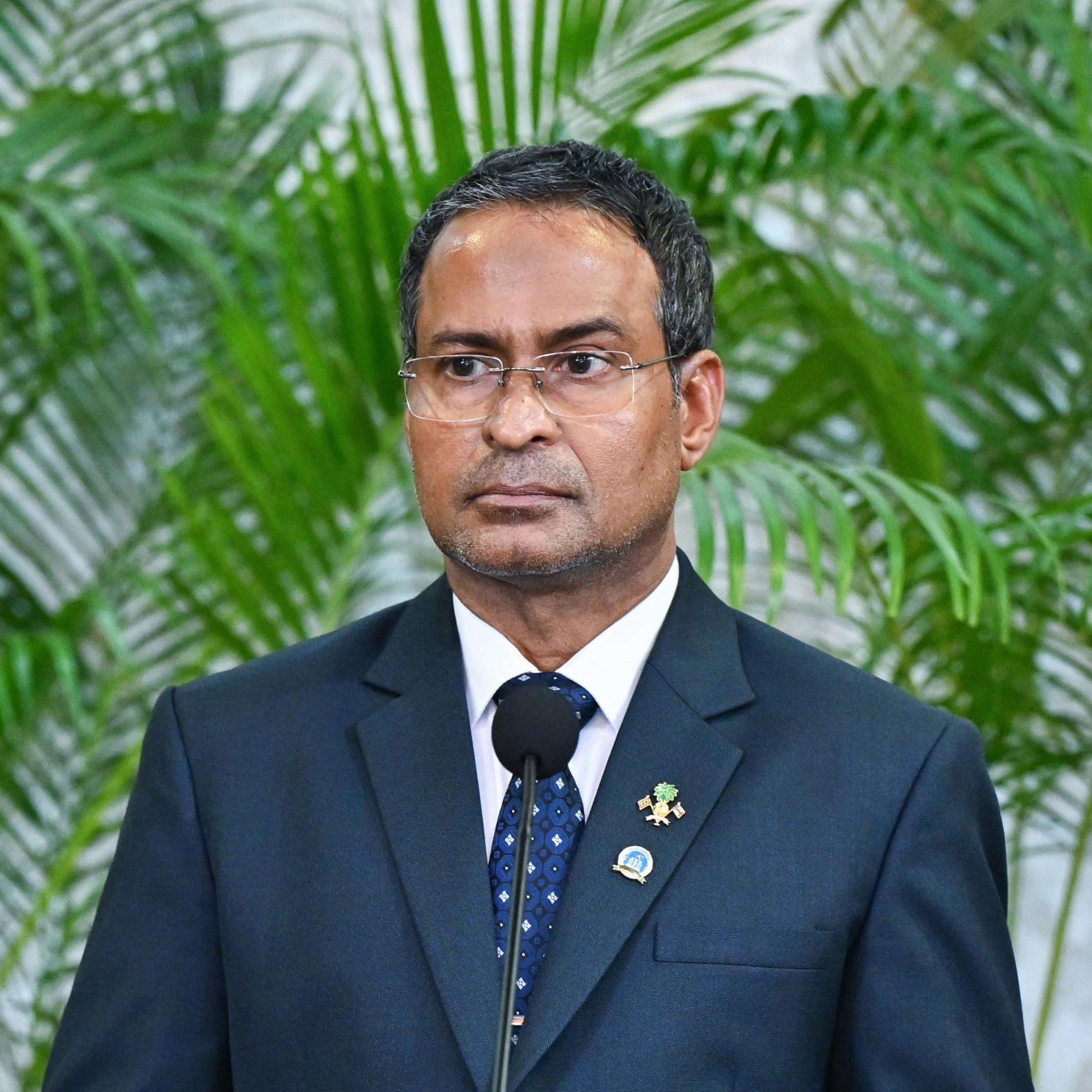
Abdul Ghanee Mohamed, Chief Justice of the Maldives since 2025

The Chief Justice of the Maldives is the highest authority of the entire Maldivian judiciary, they are the final authority on the interpretation of the Constitution of the Maldives, any law, or matter dealt with by a court of law. The Chief Justice is appointed by the President of the Maldives after a consultation with the Judicial Service Commission and a confirmation of the nominee by a majority vote by the members of the People's Majlis.

On 18 September 2008, Abdulla Saeed was appointed by President Maumoon Abdul Gayoom as the first Chief Justice. Saeed served as the Chief Justice until 10 August 2010, where President Mohamed Nasheed appointed Ahmed Faiz Hussain as the Chief Justice under the 2010 Judicature Act.

The longest-serving Chief Justice was Ahmed Muthasim Adnan, who was appointed by President Ibrahim Mohamed Solih on 8 December 2019 and retired on 20 July 2025.

== List ==
No.	Portrait	Name (Birth–Death)	Start of Term	End of Term	Length of Term	Appointer (President of the Maldives)	Ref.
1		Abdulla Saeed (b. 1964)	18 September 2008	10 August 2010	1 year, 326 days	Maumoon Abdul Gayoom	
2		Ahmed Faiz Hussain (b. 1963)	10 August 2010	11 December 2014	4 years, 123 days	Mohamed Nasheed	
3		Abdulla Saeed (b. 1964)	14 December 2014	20 June 2018	3 years, 188 days	Abdulla Yameen	
4		Ahmed Abdulla Didi (b. 1966)	28 June 2018	18 November 2019	1 year, 143 days	Abdulla Yameen	
5		Ahmed Muthasim Adnan (b. 1965)	8 December 2019	20 July 2025	5 years, 224 days	Ibrahim Mohamed Solih	
6		Abdul Ghanee Mohamed	6 August 2025	Incumbent	1 year, 23 days	Mohamed Muizzu	
