= Husnu Al Suood =

Maldivian lawyer (born 1967)

- ޙުސްނުއްސުޢޫދު
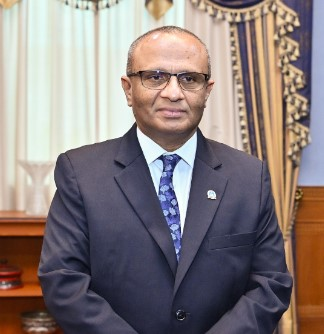
- Suood in 2024

Justice of the Supreme Court
- In office 8 December 2019 – 4 March 2025
- President: Ibrahim Mohamed Solih; Mohamed Muizzu
- Succeeded by: Hussain Shaheedh

Attorney General
- In office 7 July 2010 – 8 August 2010
- President: Mohamed Nasheed
- Preceded by: Himself
- Succeeded by: Abdullah Muizzu
- In office 2 June 2009 – 29 June 2010
- President: Mohamed Nasheed
- Preceded by: Fathimath Dhiyana Saeed
- Succeeded by: Himself

Personal details
- Born: 12 January 1967 (age 59) Meedhoo, Addu City, Addu Atoll, Sultanate of the Maldive Islands
- Education: International Islamic University of Malaysia; University of Queensland

Husnu Al Suood (Dhivehi: ޙުސްނުއްސުޢޫދު; born 12 January 1967) is a Maldivian lawyer and former Justice of the Supreme Court of the Maldives from 2019 to 2025. He was the Attorney General of the Maldives from June 2009 to August 2010. He served as the Chief Judge of the Civil Court (1997 - 1999) and as a member of the Judicial Service Commission of Maldives (2008 to 2010). He also served as a member of the National Human Rights Commission of the Maldives from 2003 to 2005. As a member of the Special Majlis, Suood participated in drafting the current constitution of the Republic of Maldives.

== Early life and education ==
Suood was born on 12 January 1967 in Meedhoo. He has a Master of Laws from the University of Queensland, and a Bachelor of Laws from the International Islamic University Malaysia.

== Career ==
Political parties had been banned in the Maldives since 1953. The President appointed eight out of the fifty seats in the parliament and also the speaker. The President also acted as the court of final appeal. Media was put under state control. After more than 25 years of absolute dictatorship and iron fist rule, Gayoom was forced to announce a reform package in 2004, as a result of growing opposition locally coupled with international pressure.

Since 2001, Suood was at the forefront of the democracy movement that later evolved into the major opposition to Gayyoom's lengthy rule.

In February 2001, Mohamed Nasheed, Hussain Rasheed Hassan and Husnu Al Suood took the initiative to register a political party in the Maldives. The initiative was later supported by 42 members who subscribed to the formation of the Maldivian Democratic Party (MDP). As the registration papers submitted to the Ministry of Home Affairs had to be compiled clandestinely, Suood had to name the party and write down its principles and ideology on his own and without any consultation. Although the Maldivian Constitution allows political parties to operate, the MDP's application was refused. After the death of Evan Naseem in 2003 and the violent subsequent street protests, Mohamed Nasheed and Mohamed Latheef declared the existence of MDP in exile from Sri Lanka on November 10, 2003. Members of MDP's first general council were elected on February 13, 2004.

Although MDP was not recognized by the Maldivian government, it began operating in the Maldives on April 30, 2005.

On June 2, 2005, the members of the People's Majlis unanimously voted to legally recognize political parties. The MDP subsequently submitted its registration on June 26, 2005 becoming the first political party to be registered in the Republic of Maldives since 1953.

On 13 August 2004, while Suood was a member of the National Human Rights Commission, he was arrested and held in solitary confinement in the notorious Dhoonidhoo prison for 81 days, without access to a lawyer.

During the detention Suood was asked why and on whose instructions he had agreed to act as legal counsel for Dr. Hussain Rasheed Hassan, Ilyas Hussain and Ahmed Shafeeq.

In 2005, Suood was elected to the People's Special Majlis that was convened to draft a new Constitution for the country. His efforts in shaping the fundamental rights chapter is noteworthy, particularly his initiative to lower the voting age from 21 to 18.

During Suood's legal career, he has been debarred from legal practice by the regime for representing dissidents and clients who have fallen out of favour with the government, resulting in huge financial loss.

From 2009 to 2010, Suood served as the Attorney General.

The Maldives did not have an organization to represent or to regulate the legal profession. In 2012, Suood took the initiative to register the Maldives Bar Association (MBA). Suood was elected as the President of the Maldives Bar Association on 17 May 2013.

In a public statement released by the Maldives Bar Association in July 2013, MBA insisted that Supreme Court Judge Ali Hameed who was under investigation for his alleged involvement of a sex tape must be suspended whilst the probe was ongoing. The case was investigated by the Judicial Service Commission (JSC), but no action was taken against the scandal-hit judge and continued to sit on the Supreme Court bench. Bar Association raised questions over the impartiality of the investigation if Judge Ali Hameed was not suspended. It said that a judge facing such serious accusations continuing to preside over trials had undermined the entire justice system. The statement also urged swift action against the judge in order to restore confidence and respect for the judiciary. Subsequently, the Supreme Court instructed the Minister of Home Affairs to dissolve the Maldives Bar Association.

On 8 December 2019, Suood was appointed as a justice of the Supreme Court of the Maldives.

On 26 February 2025, the JSC suspended Suood, Azmiralda Zahir, and Mahaz Ali Zahir following the fifth amendment to the Judicature Act, where the Supreme Court bench can only have five justices instead of the previous seven. JSC later announced they were suspended following disciplinary issues and an ongoing investigation by the Anti-Corruption Commission.

During the debate in passing the fifth amendment to the Judicature Act, PNC MPs along with Deputy Speaker Ahmed Nazim branded Suood as an activist.

On 4 March 2025, Suood resigned in protest against the government.

== Notable cases ==
During the democratic uprising in the Maldives from 2003 to 2008, Suood defended criminal charges against hundreds of human rights and democracy activists in the Maldives, including the then Chairperson of the Maldivian Democratic Party (MDP), Mohamed Nasheed, (later elected as the President of the Maldives) against charges of terrorism. Suood complained that Nasheed was prevented from having a fair trial by international standards. He said that the prosecutor's team had more time than the defense team, charges were amended without notification and evidence was not handed over to the defense team. As a consequence, the defense team contemplated withdrawing from the case altogether as to protest the unfair conditions.

In addition to defending the charges against Mohamed Nasheed, other pro-democracy activists, human rights defenders, and journalists Suood had fearlessly defended pro bono between 2003 and 2008 included: Pro-democracy activists Ibrahim Shiham, Moosa Haleem, Mohamed Siddeeque and Hussain Rasheed who were arrested on the charge of participating in an “unlawful assembly” in the Republican Square in Male On 4 August 2005; MDP members who were arrested from Addu Atoll on 16 August 2005, including Abdulla Rasheed, Mohammed Saeed, Ibrahim Zadhee, Mohammed Saeedh, Abdulla Sodig, Hussein Shahid, Zahidh Hussein, Saudhullah Hameed, Mohammed Habeeb, Mohammed Sharmeel, Ibrahim Jamaal, Mohammed Zubair, Ibrahim Rasheed, Ahmed Sattar, Sobree, Shammi and Azleem; Mohamed Didi, an MDP leader, arrested in Addu Atoll for the interviews he gave to Minivan Radio regarding the unrest in Addu Atoll in April 2005 following the arrest of pro-democracy activist Mohamed Zahid; prominent journalists including Ahmed Abbas, Aminath Najeeb, Fahala Saeed, Zaheena Rasheed and Ahmed Faiz; protesters arrested from Haa Alif Dhihdhoo Island; protesters arrested from Noonu Maafaru Island.

In October 2007, Suood represented pro bono Mr. Ilham Ahmed, Mr. Ibrahim Muaz Ali and Mr. Ahmed Zahir who were unfairly dismissed from public service employment at the state broadcaster, Television Maldives (TVM). In a landmark ruling by the Civil Court, TVM was ordered to reinstate the sacked employees and compensate them for lost earnings. This was the first ever ruling issued by a Maldivian court ordering reinstatement of a sacked employee.

In June 2013, Suood represented Chief Judge of the High Court Ahmed Shareef in challenging the decision of the Judicial Services Commission to suspend him. Shareef's suspension came hours after the High Court cancelled a hearing into the case filed by former President Mohamed Nasheed challenging the legitimacy of the panel of judges presiding over the case against him for the arbitrary detention of chief criminal judge Abdulla Mohamed.

Between September and November 2013, Suood represented the Maldives Elections Commission as its lead lawyer in the Maldives Supreme Court in the controversial cases wherein the court had cancelled three rounds of voting in the Maldives presidential elections in dubious circumstances. Suood was suspended by the Supreme Court on contempt charges, following his Twitter update which stated that the decision of the Supreme Court to cancel the presidential election was, in his opinion contrary to the Constitution.

In February 2015, when all lawyers were “afraid” to represent former Deputy Speaker and member of parliament, Ahmed Nazim, to defend the corruption charges against him, Suood agreed to represent him in the Supreme Court.

In April 2015, Suood was appointed by former Defence Minister Colonel (Rtd) Mohamed Nazim to appeal his conviction for illegal possession of fire arms by the Criminal Court of Maldives.

In May 2015, Suood began defending terrorism charges filed by the Government of Maldives against President of Adhaalath Party (AP) Sheikh Imran Abdulla, and Chairman of the MDP Ali Waheed.

In July 2015, the Vice President of Maldives, Mohamed Jameel Ahmed, appointed lawyer Suood to represent him in the impeachment proceedings commenced by the Maldivian Parliament against the Vice President. However, in a letter addressed to Jameel, Speaker Abdulla Maseeh said the vice president himself must be present at the sitting, according to Article 100 (d) of the Constitution. Article 100 (d) states that the vice president shall have the right to defend himself in the sittings of the People's Majlis, both orally and in writing, and has the right to legal counsel.

In October 2015, Suood began defending Hamid Ismail, who was arrested following the dismissal and detention of Vice President Ahmed Adeeb.

In February 2016, Suood began defending terrorism charges filed by the government against former Chief Prosecutor of Maldives Muhthaz Muhsin. Muhthaz was dismissed from office following his decision not to charge former Vice President Ahmed Adeeb with terrorism.

In April 2016, Suood began defending terrorism charges filed by the government against Judge Ahmed Nihan.

In October/November 2016, Suood represented former President of Maldives Maumoon Abdul Gayoom, and then-President of the Progressive Party of Maldives (PPM) in the controversial High Court and Supreme Court cases, through which his half-brother and then-President of Maldives Abdulla Yameen Abdul Gayoom took-over control of PPM from his elder brother. Following the fierce and aggressive litigation Suood was disbarred from legal practice by Maldives Supreme Court on 31 October 2016 on contempt charges. Suood was neither given an opportunity to reply to the charges, nor was he able to appeal the decision of the Supreme Court.

In April 2017, Suood filed a case against the Maldives Police Service for its failure to protect famous writer and blogger, Yameen Rasheed, who was brutally murdered after having received several death threats over a period of five years. Despite having reported death threats the Maldives Police Service failed to take any action to protect the blogger.

== Publications ==
- Principles of Islamic Law of Evidence and Its Application in the Maldives (2021), The Maldives Law Institute, Male’, Maldives.
- Dhivehi Law Dictionary (2018), The Maldives Law Institute, Male’, Maldives.
- Islamic Law of Inheritance (2018), The Maldives Law Institute, Male’, Maldives.
- Drafting Commercial Contracts (2018), The Maldives Law Institute, Male’, Maldives.
- Textbook of Maldives Land Law (2017), The Maldives Law Institute, Male’, Maldives.
- Dhivehi Bas Thaanain Liyumuge Qawaaidhu (Writing Thaana - Use of Space between Words) (2017), Dhivehi Research Center, Male’, Maldives.
- Understanding Maldivian Law of Contract (2016), The Maldives Law Institute, Male’, Maldives.
- Law and Society (2015), The Maldives Law Institute, Male’, Maldives.
- Model Civil Procedure (2015), The Maldives Law Institute, Male’, Maldives.
- The Maldivian Legal System (2014), (written in English language), The Maldives Law Institute, Male’, Maldives (Standard and authoritative text on Maldivian Legal System currently in use by students and practitioners.)
- Understanding Maldivian Company Law (2009), Novelty Printers and Publishers, Male’, Maldives (Standard and authoritative text of Maldivian company law currently in use by students and practitioners.)
- The Maldivian Legal System, (2007) (Written in Dhivehi Language) Loamaafaanu Printers and Publishers, Male’, Maldives.
- Our Rights – Our Nation, (2006) Novelty Printers and Publishers, Male’, Maldives.
- International Human Rights, (2004) Novelty Printers and Publishers, Male’, Maldives.

== Teaching ==
1996- 1998, Suood taught contract law and constitutional law at College of Islamic Studies, Maldives.

2000 to 2001, Suood taught the Maldivian legal system at Faculty of Shari’ah and Law, Maldives National University.

2007 – 2009, Suood taught company law and land law at Faculty of Shari’ah and Law, Maldives National University.

Suood was appointed as the Dean of Faculty of Law at Villa College, Maldives in July 2013. In February 2016, Suood resigned from Villa College to reorganize the Maldives Law Institute he founded in 2010.

In 2010, Suood co-founded the Maldives Law Institute with Mohamed Shahdy Anwar. Maldives Law Institute was established with the vision of further developing the Maldivian legal system by helping to improve and strengthen by legal research, publication of research journals and conducting continuing legal education programs for legal practitioners, judges, legal academics and law enforcement officers. Maldives Law Institute continues to publish the Maldives Law Review which is a peer review law quarterly journal and is also the first of its kind in the Maldives.

== Awards ==
National Award of Recognition for Outstanding Services in the Field of Law, Government of Maldives, 2011 (Only recipient so far in the category of law for this public service award, which has been given since 1979).
