= Ali Hussain v. State (Maldives) =

Ongoing constitutional case

- Court: Supreme Court of the Maldives
- Full case name: Ali Hussain v. State (Attorney General's Office)
- Started: 17 February 2025
- Decided: 29 April 2026
- Verdict: Valid

Court membership
- Chief Justice: Ahmed Muthasim Adnan (2025–2026); Abdul Ghanee Mohamed (2025–)
- Associate judges: Azmiralda Zahir (until 14 May 2025); Aisha Shujune Muhammad; Mahaz Ali Zahir (until 14 May 2025); Husnu Al Suood (until 4 March 2025); Ali Rasheed Hussain; Mohamed Ibrahim; Hussain Shaheed; Abdulla Hameed; Mohamed Saleem

Ali Hussain v. State (Maldives) (Case number: 2024/SC-C/02) was a constitutional case being held before the Supreme Court of the Maldives. The case was filed by lawyer and former Kendhoo MP Ali Hussain in November 2024 to challenge the Sixth Amendment to the Constitution of the Maldives, which introduced an anti-defection law for members of parliament (MP) according to which an MP who was expelled from or voluntarily left his party would lose his seat.

Hussain argues that although the parliament completed formal procedures, consultation was ignored and lacked scrutiny.

== Background ==
On 20 November 2024, the People's Majlis passed the Sixth Amendment to the Constitution of the Maldives which introduced an anti-defection clause, additional powers to the President, territorial law changes, and foreign military presence regulations.

Following the criticism and concern by the public, lawyer Ali Hussain submitted a case to the Supreme Court, seeking to revoke the amendment. The Maldivian Democratic Party (MDP) and The Democrats later decided to intervene in the case, with the latter later withdrawing. Five days later, the court accepted the case.

== Supreme Court ==
On 17 February 2025, the court heard arguments from both parties and whether the court has jurisdiction to hear the case. The court later ruled that it does have jurisdiction after the state was unable to answer the justice's questions.

=== Oral arguments ===
Oral arguments were delivered on 17 February 2025.

Ali Hussain's lawyer Mahfooz Saeed argued that MPs that defect or get expelled from a political party isn't a feature of a presidential system, which the Maldives follows. Hussain also alleged that the amendment was passed without proper procedure being followed. State attorney argued that if treating it as a law would make significant procedural problems.

=== Verdict ===
On 29 April 2026, the court announced that the amendment was valid. Delivering the verdict, Chief Justice Abdul Ghanee Mohamed had said that the amendment doesn't violate constitutional supremacy.

== Reactions ==
=== Government reaction ===
In a report by Adhadhu, President Mohamed Muizzu called for an emergency cabinet meeting after the Supreme Court ruling that it can hear the case. The President's Office's Spokesperson Heena Waleed denied this in a post on Twitter.

==== Government interference ====
After the court ruled that it can hear the case, Holhudhoo MP Abdul Sattar Mohamed, on behalf of the government, proposed an amendment to the Judicature Act to change the Supreme Court bench back to five justices, providing no explanation as to why. The bill was later passed throughout the People's Majlis, and later on the Judicial Services Commission (JSC) suspended Husnu Al Suood, Azmiralda Zahir, and Mahaz Ali Zahir in connection an investigation by the Anti-Corruption Commission and disciplinary issues. Suood later resigned in protest, and the fifth amendment to the Judicature Act was sent back to parliament by President Muizzu. After Suood resigned, Hussain Shaheedh was appointed as a judge to fill in the vacant spot.

Ever since the judges were suspended, the court has been "paralyzed" and has been unable to hear the case due to constitutional cases only able to being heard by the SC's full bench.

The JSC later submitted a report to the People's Majlis and a recommendation to remove Azmiralda and Mahaz as justices. Many international organizations such as LAWASIA, Commonwealth Lawyers Association, UN Expert Margaret Satterthwaite, Nepal Bar Association and more widely expressed concern over the judiciary and called for the government to reinstate all the judges. The People's Majlis later voted to remove Azmiralda and Mahaz in a 68–11 vote.
