= Ahmed Faiz Hussain =

Maldivian lawyer (born 1963)

- އަޙްމަދު ފާއިޒު ޙުސައިން
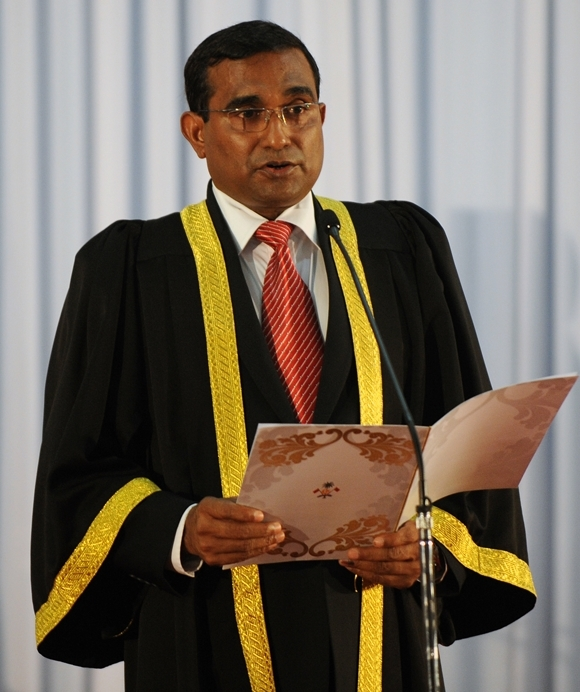
- Faiz in 2013

2nd Chief Justice of the Maldives
- In office 10 August 2010 – 11 December 2014
- President: Mohamed Nasheed; Mohamed Waheed Hassan; Abdulla Yameen
- Preceded by: Abdulla Saeed
- Succeeded by: Abdulla Saeed

Justice of the Supreme Court of the Maldives
- In office 18 September 2008 – 10 August 2010
- President: Maumoon Abdul Gayoom; Mohamed Nasheed

Personal details
- Born: 28 April 1963 (age 62) Vaikaradhoo, Haa Alif Atoll, Maldives

Ahmed Faiz Hussain (Dhivehi: އަޙްމަދު ފާއިޒު ޙުސައިން; born 28 April 1963) is a Maldivian lawyer and former judge who served as the 2nd Chief Justice of the Maldives from 2010 to 2014. Hussain previously served as a Justice of the Supreme Court of the Maldives from 2008 to 2010.

== Early life ==
Ahmed Faiz Hussain was born on 28 April 1963 in Vaikaradhoo, Haa Alif Atoll.

== Career ==
Hussain had served as a judge at the Civil Court and the High Court of the Maldives.

On 18 September 2008, Hussain was a Justice at the Supreme Court of the Maldives.

In 2010, President Mohamed Nasheed nominated Hussain as the Chief Justice. He was later appointed as the Chief Justice.

As the Chief Justice, he had sworn in Mohamed Waheed Hassan as the President following the resignation of Mohamed Nasheed. He had also sworn in Abdulla Yameen and Mohamed Jameel Ahmed as the President and Vice President respectively.

In 2014, the People's Majlis passed an amendment to the Judicature Act, where the Supreme Court bench decreased from seven to five judges. Hours after the amendment was ratified, the Judicial Service Commission (JSC) called an emergency meeting where they recommended that Hussain and Judge Ahmed Muthasim Adnan be removed. The Majlis later removed both of them. The International Commission of Jurists called it an "arbitrary and unlawful removal", the United Nations Special Rapporteur on the independence of judges and lawyers Gabriela Knaul urged authorities to reconsider their dismissal.

In 2019, President Ibrahim Mohamed Solih consulted with the JSC to reappoint Hussain to the Supreme Court bench. The JSC later advised President Solih against reappointment following unconstitutional decisions made during his time as Chief Justice.
