= Azmiralda Zahir =

Maldivian lawyer (born 1979)

- އަޒްމިރާލްދާ ޒާހިރު
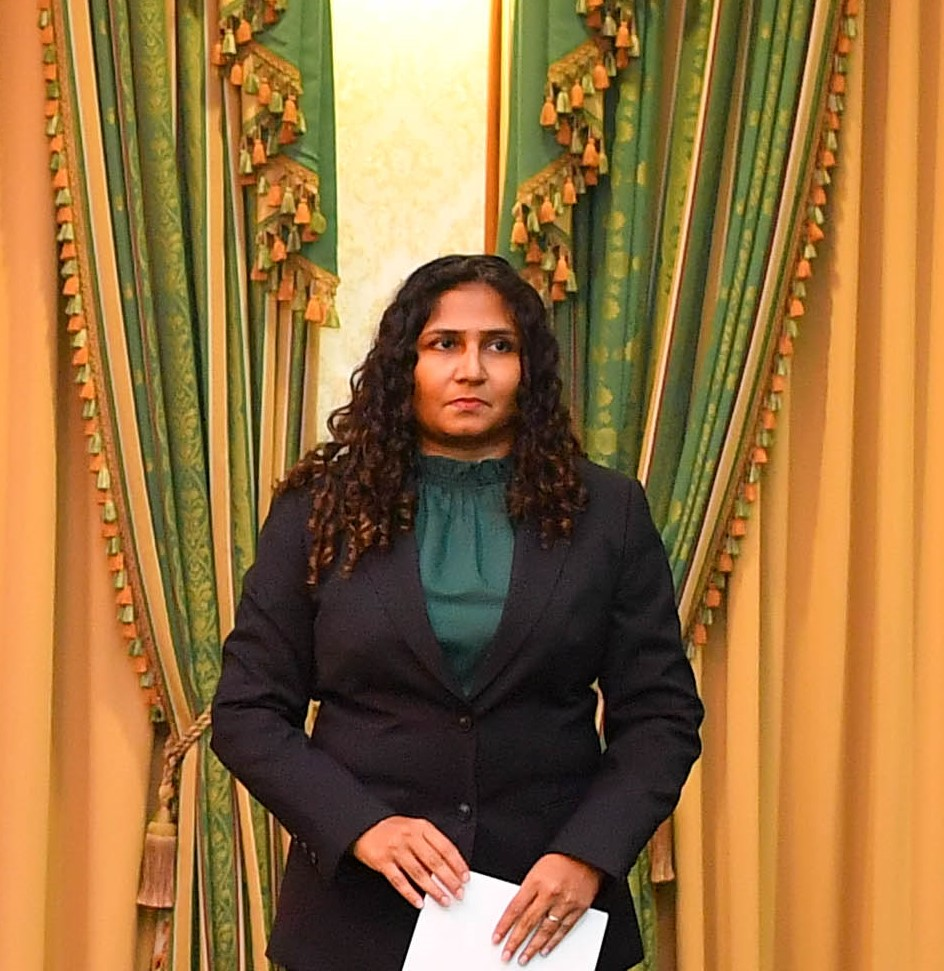
- Zahir in 2023

Justice of the Supreme Court of the Maldives
- In office 4 September 2019 – 14 May 2025
- Nominated by: Ibrahim Mohamed Solih
- President: Ibrahim Mohamed Solih; Mohamed Muizzu

Judge of the High Court of the Maldives
- In office 26 March 2011 – 12 May 2016
- President: Mohamed Nasheed; Mohamed Waheed Hassan; Abdulla Yameen
- Succeeded by: Shujau Usman

Personal details
- Born: 19 July 1979 (age 47) Malé, Maldives
- Spouse: Ismail Latheef
- Education: Cardiff University (LL.B); University of Portsmouth (LL.M); University of Exeter (PhD)

Azmiralda Zahir (Dhivehi: އަޒްމިރާލްދާ ޒާހިރު; born 19 July 1979) is a Maldivian lawyer and jurist who served as a Justice of the Supreme Court of the Maldives from 2019 to 2025. After studying law in the United Kingdom, Zahir began practicing law in the Maldives in 1999. In 2011, she was appointed to the High Court of the Maldives, and at the time of her resignation in 2016 was described as the country's most senior female judge. Zahir also served as the Maldives' first female Chief Justice when she temporarily filled the vacancy caused by the retirement of Abdulla Areef in November 2019.

== Early life and education ==
Zahir was born and raised in Malé. She obtained her bachelor of laws from Cardiff University and her master's degree from the University of Portsmouth, before receiving a PhD in International Intellectual Property Law from the University of Exeter.

== Legal career (1999–2011) ==
Zahir obtained her licence to practice in the Maldives in 1999, and in 2001 worked in the legal department of Malé City Council. Between 2002 and 2007, she worked for the Maldives Law Commission, drafting bills due to be submitted to the People's Majlis for review.

In 2009, Zahir began lecturing in law at the Maldives National University, subsequently going on to serve as dean of the Faculty of Sharia and Law.

== Judicial career (2011–present) ==
=== High Court of the Maldives (2011–2016) ===
On 26 March 2011, Zahir was appointed to serve on the High Court of the Maldives, becoming the first woman in the country to sit on an appellate court.

In 2015, Zahir was temporarily transferred to the High Court's newly established southern branch, sitting in Addu City. After five months, in 2016 her transfer was announced as permanent. Zahir appealed this decision to the parliamentary oversight committee, stating that she was the only judge with childcare responsibilities, and that working in Addu City would prevent her from caring for her two children. The committee ultimately rejected Zahir's complaint, stating it had no jurisdiction over judicial transfers. Zahir subsequently wrote letters to the Judicial Services Commission and the then-President of the Maldives, Abdulla Yameen, stating that the transfer had been unannounced and was discriminatory against her rights as a mother; she reported that Yameen told her that the transfer was "not a matter he could address".

Zahir subsequently announced her resignation from the High Court in protest at her transfer; at the time, she was the Maldives' most senior female judge, and the only sitting female judge following the resignations of Aisha Shujune and Mariyam Nihayath in 2014 and 2015, respectively. The International Commission of Jurists criticised Zahir's transfer, describing it as "arbitrary" and comparing it to a demotion due to the southern branch not being authorised to hear complaints over constitutional matters.

Following her resignation, Zahir went into private practice.

=== Supreme Court of the Maldives (2019–2025) ===
In 2019, the Judicature Act was amended to increase the size of the Supreme Court from five justices to seven. The President of the Maldives, Ibrahim Mohamed Solih, announced in August 2019 his intention to nominate Zahir, alongside Aisha Shujune Muhammad, as the Supreme Court's two new justices. Following interviews with the Judicial Service Commission (JSC), Zahir and Shujune were accepted as suitable candidates, with a vote planned for the People's Majlis.

Zahir and Shujune's nominations were met with opposition by some clerics who stated that Islam forbade women from serving as judges. Former Maldivian president Maumoon Abdul Gayoom, a scholar who studied at Al-Azhar University, released a statement supporting Zahir and Shujune's nominations, citing several prominent Islamic scholars who concluded that appointing female judges was permissible, including Al-Tabari, Ibn Hazm, Hasan al-Basri and Yusuf al-Qaradawi.

The People's Majlis subsequently approved Zahir and Shujune's appointments to the Supreme Court, with 62 out of 64 MPs present voting in favour, with one MP voting against and another abstaining. Zahir became a Justice of the Supreme Court on 4 September 2019 after being presented with a letter of appointment by Solih and giving an oath administered by the Chief Justice, Ahmed Abdulla Didi.

Zahir and Shujune became the first female justices to sit on the Supreme Court of the Maldives since it was established in 2008. The Minister for Gender, Shidhatha Shareef, released a statement calling Zahir and Shujune's appointments a "historic day".

Zahir's first allocation as a Supreme Court Justice was a case filed by a private citizen against the state over an employment issue.

Zahir was suspended as a justice of the Supreme Court following the fifth amendment to the Judicature Act, where it was decided to slash the Supreme Court bench back to five justices. The JSC suspended her along with Husnu Al Suood, and Mahaz Ali Zahir in response to an investigation by the Anti-Corruption Commission, and disciplinary issues. Zahir was accused of influencing lower courts via Mahaz Ali Zahir which Azmiralada denied. The People's Majlis later dismissed the two justices based on the report sent by JSC to the parliament. Many international organizations such as Human Rights Watch, Commonwealth Lawyers Association, and UN expert Margaret Satterthwaite called on the government to reinstate the justices and are highly concerned about the government undermining judiciary independence.

==== Chief Justice of the Supreme Court of the Maldives (2019) ====
In November 2019, Zahir was announced as the interim Chief Justice of the Supreme Court following the retirement of Abdulla Areef on health grounds. Areef himself had been temporarily filling the position following the suspension and subsequent dismissal of Ahmed Abdullah Didi. Despite having only sat on the Supreme Court for two months, Zahir was the most senior justice after Areef following the dismissals of Didi and Adam Mohamed, and the subsequent suspension of Abdul Ghanee Mohamed. Zahir remained in the post until Ahmed Muthasim Adnan was appointed as the permanent Chief Justice on 8 December 2019.

== See also ==
- Abbas Shareef
