= Hulhumeedhoo =

- District of Addu City
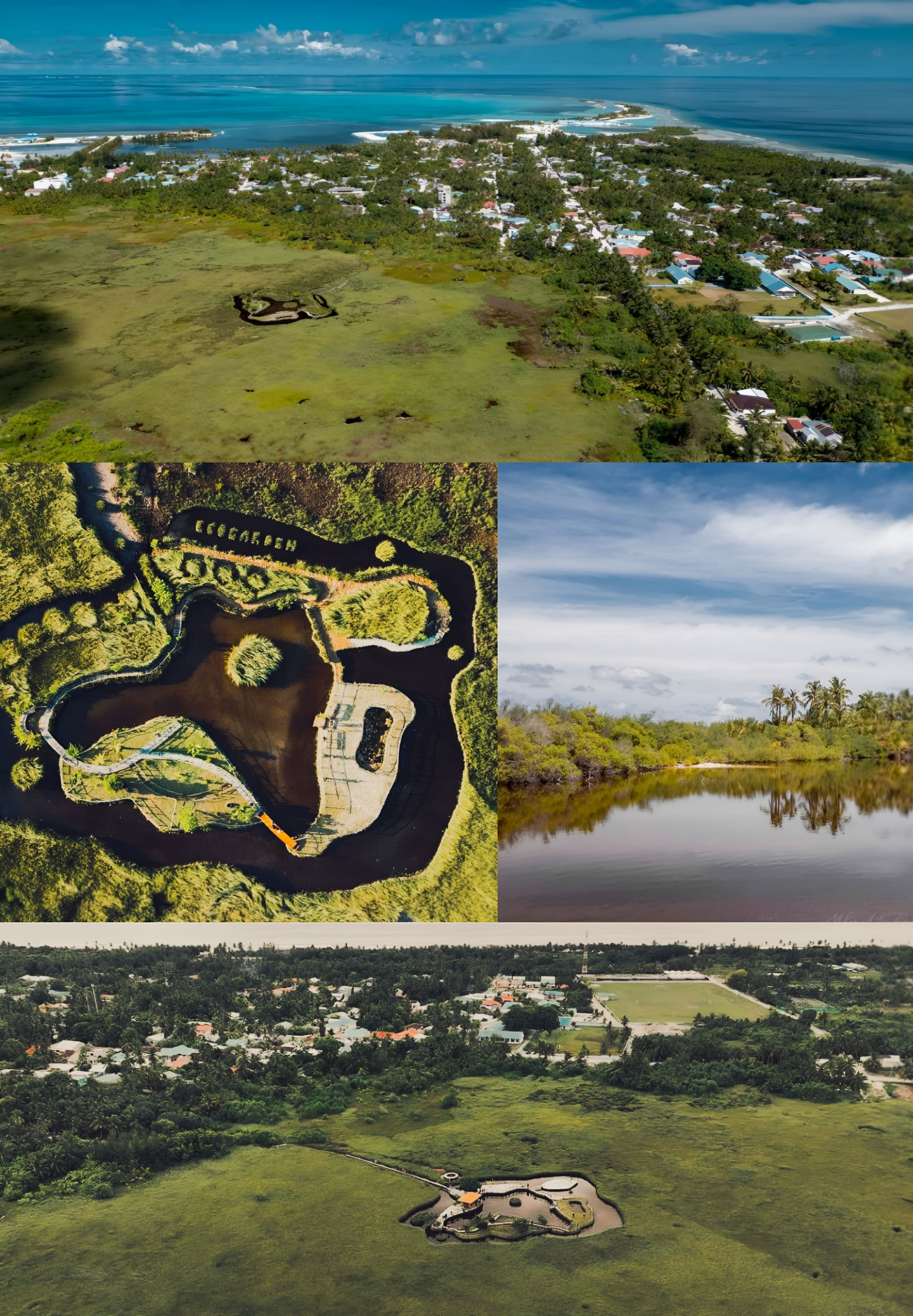
- Interactive map of Hulhumeedhoo
- Coordinates: 0.587243°S 73.232281°E
- Country: Maldives
- Geographic atoll: Addu
- Administrative atoll: Seenu

Government
  - Type: Local government
  - Body: Addu City Council

Area
  - Total: 3.2273 km^{2} (1.2461 sq mi)
  - Meedhoo: 1.8773 km^{2} (0.7248 sq mi)
  - Hulhudhoo: 1.35 km^{2} (0.52 sq mi)
- Elevation: 2.5 m (8.2 ft)

Population (2024)
  - Total: 6,845
  - Meedhoo: 3,082
  - Hulhudhoo: 3,763
- Time zone: UTC+5 (MVT)
- Website: adducity.gov.mv

Hulhumeedhoo (Dhivehi: ހުޅުމީދޫ) or Hulhudhoo-Meedhoo is an island located on the northeastern end of Addu City. It is the fifth largest island in the Maldives. Although Hulhumeedhoo is geographically one island, it is divided into two administrative constituencies of Addu City; Meedhoo and Hulhudhoo, which are roughly the northern half and southern half of the island respectively. The name Hulhumeedhoo is an amalgamation of Hulhudhoo and Meedhoo.

== Meedhoo ==
Meedhoo (Dhivehi: މީދޫ) is the oldest populated island in Addu Atoll, having been settled between 1000 and 500 BCE. Its name comes from the original Indo-Aryan settlers, the "dhoo" comes from sanskrit "dwīpa" meaning island but the meaning of "mee" is obscure.

Meedhoo is generally considered to be the northern half of Hulhumeedhoo, and has an area of 1.827 km^{2} and a population of 2,953 (2017).

Historical population
Year	Pop.	±%
2014	1,500	—
2022	1,892	+26.1%
2024	3,082	+62.9%
2014-2022-2024: Census populations Source:

== Hulhudhoo ==
Hulhudhoo (Dhivehi:ހުޅުދޫ) is the third most populous island in Addu Atoll. It is located on the north-east side of the atoll adjoining the island of Meedhoo to the north. The island is approximately 530 km south of Male' City, the capital of Maldives. Hulhudhoo has a population of 3,687 people (2017). In the vaguely defined border dividing the island into two constituencies, Hulhudhoo is the southern half of Hulhumeedhoo. Hulhudhoo means "small island" with hulhu being the modern form of old dhivehi word "sulhu" meaning small.

Hulhudhoo spreads to an area of around 1.05km^{2}. Hulhudhoo's landscape is mainly of palms trees and thick tropical vegetation as in other islands of the atoll. The island consists of small roads, close lanes, large number of closely built houses, only a few have a second floor, green vegetation surrounds most of the housing compounds, specially banana trees and in some households there are even taro (އަލަ) fields within the housing compound. This vegetation is regarded as part domestic agriculture and is often sent to Male' to local market.

To the south of Hulhudhoo is Herathera. An uninhabited section of the island which is located to the south, within the lagoon of Hulhudhoo. This island is linked with Hulhudhoo by bridge. The island of Maafishi, which is also located on the south of Hulhudhoo.

Historical population
Year	Pop.	±%
2014	900	—
2022	1,182	+31.3%
2024	3,763	+218.4%
2014-2022-2024: Census populations Source:

== Geography ==
Hulhumeedhoo's shape loosely resembles that of the letter D or a harp. It is the northeasternmost island of Addu Atoll, making it the closest island to Fuvahmulah, which is located about 40km to the northeast. The closest inhabited islands, Hithadhoo, Maradhoo, Maradhoo-Feydhoo and Feydhoo (Addu City contiguous) are located no more than 15 kilometers away, about 20 minutes by speedboat.

== History ==
The original settlers were Dhivehi people of Aryan origin. An Arab traveller named Yoosuf Naib introduced Islam to the island many years before the rest of the Maldives converted to Islam, and built the country's first mosque. The island has since been known as a centre of learning and Islamic religious education.

The 900 year old Kōgaṇṇu Cemetery in Meedhoo is the oldest cemetery in the Maldives. The largest tombstone in the country is also found in this cemetery. It is believed that this tombstone dates back to the 18th century and belongs to a royal of the Maldives.

== Education ==
Schools within Hulhumeedhoo include Asriyya Preschool, Shareefee Preschool, Nasriyya Preschool and Seenu Atoll School. Seenu Atoll School is the only secondary school in the island.

== Landmarks ==
Hulhumeedhoo, being one of the oldest populated islands in the Maldives, is also home to remnants of the Second World War and even centuries-old relics. Most of the ancient artifacts are found at Kogannu Cemetery, the oldest cemetery in the country, which is home to many mosques and tombs of antiquity. The island is home to World War II era remnants like coastal defence artillery and fortifications (Dhé Badi Dheythere), built on the island's eastern coast by the British based at RAF Gan as defence against Axis powers.

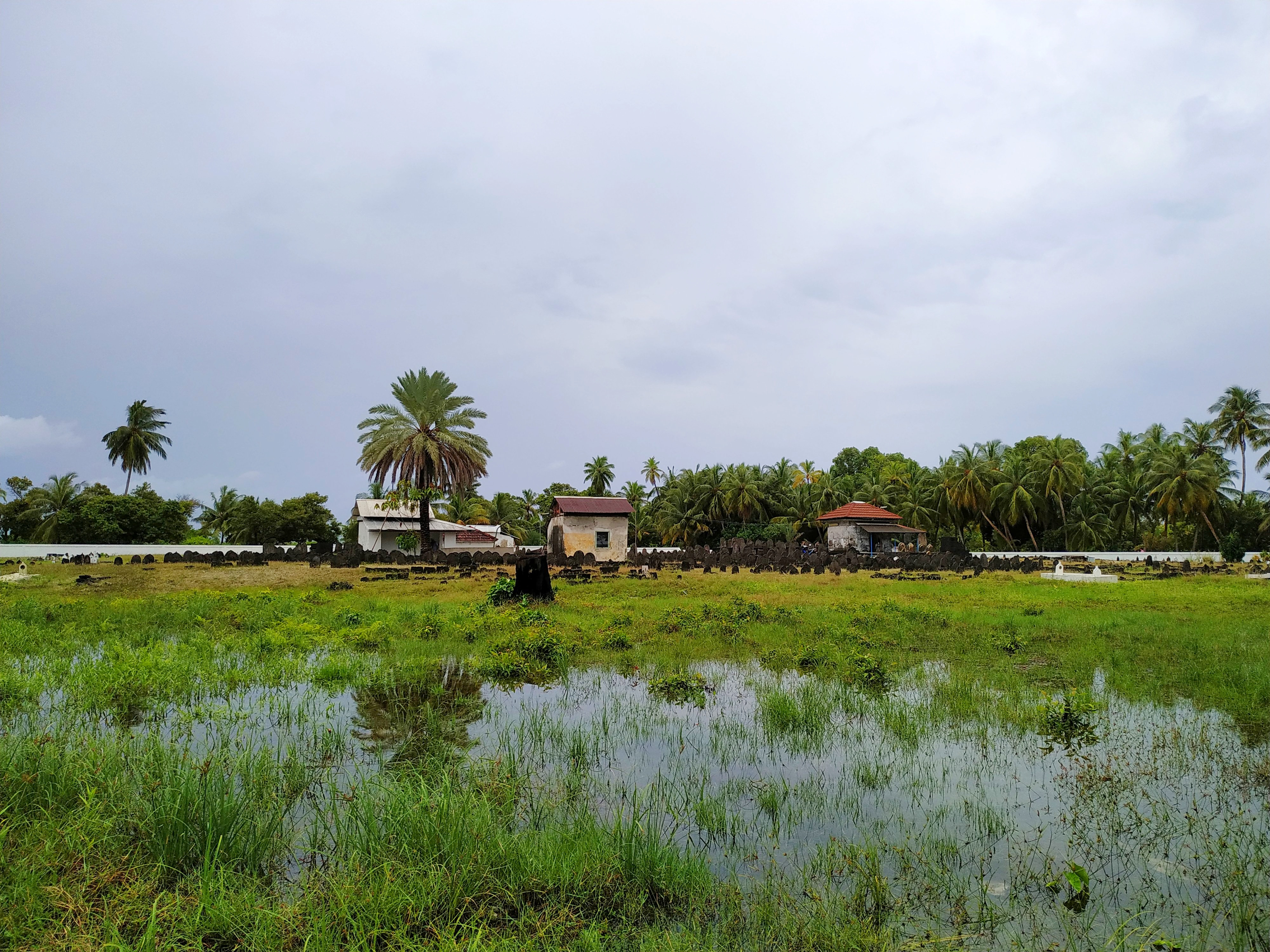
Kōgaṇṇu cemetery (facing east) during the wet season in 2019

=== Beaches ===
Some notable beaches of the island include, Eedhigamool beach, Kogannu beach, Kalhibih, Bomaa Fannu, Veyraando. To the south of the island is Canareef Island Resort, formerly Herathera, which was a part of the island that was separated to build a resort. To the north is a similar situation, Ismehelaa Hera, also separated from Hulhumeedhoo to build South Palm Maldives.

=== Medhebandharo ===
Medhebandharo / Medhubandharu (މެދެބަނދަރޮ), is the central harbour of the island. It is home to MTCC Hulhumeedhoo Ferry Terminal and Addu Fisheries Complex.

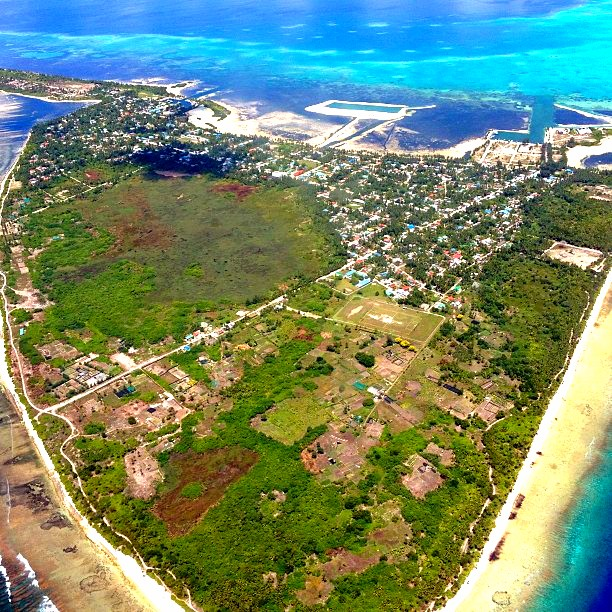
Aerial view of Hulhumeedhoo in 2013 with burnt areas of Kilhi visible (center left).

== Kilhi ==
Hulhumeedhoo Kilhi or Mathikilhi or simply, Kilhi (ކިޅި) is a large, marshy grassland of around 50 hectares located in the centre of Hulhumeedhoo known for its ponds. Although in this case, it refers to a marsh, "Kilhi" usually means either lake or wetland in the Addu dialect of the Dhivehi language. The ponds are known to have a few freshwater fish species including, Greenstripe Barb (Puntius vittatus) and a species of swamp eel.

Kilhi has been becoming more and more popular, ever since the building of a pond named "Mathikilhi Eco Garden". It has since been an icon and landmark of the island.

=== Wildfires ===
Wildfires occur in the dry, open marsh a few times every year. The cause of ignition is usually attributed to intentional or even accidental fires, although natural ignition is also possible. In 2018, a fire in the Kilhi area destroyed the nearby WAMCO site, the island's waste management office.

== Total Demography ==
Historical population
Year	Pop.	±%
2014	2,400	—
2022	3,074	+28.1%
2024	6,845	+122.7%
2006-2014-2022: Census populations Source:
