= Mathikilhi Eco Garden =

First Ecological Wetland Park in the Maldives

- މަތިކިޅި އީކޯ ގާޑަން
- Interactive map of Mathikilhi Eco Garden
- Type: Wetland
- Location: Narugis Hin'gun, Meedhoo, Addu City, Maldives
- Coordinates: 0.5865°S 73.2320°E

Mathikilhi Eco Garden (Dhivehi: މަތިކިޅި އީކޯ ގާޑަން; is a wetland or a grassland in Meedhoo, Addu City, Maldives. There are many water lakes in the eco garden. The biggest water lake 'Fenfila koaru' is in the center of the wetland. Mathikilhi Eco Garden is the first Wetland Garden in the Maldives. The wetland's some of the water lakes were dug by people themselves. The beauty of the eco garden is shown by the water lakes and the grasses.

The eco-garden was built by a group of people from Meedhoo The eco garden began operations in 2016. The ponds in the eco garden are known to have a few freshwater fish species including, Greenstripe barb (Puntius vittatus) and a species of Swamp eel. Mathikilhi eco garden is around 50 hectors big.

== See also ==
- Hulhumeedhoo
- Addu City
- Addu Atoll
- Maldives
