= Abdulla Saeed =

- އަބްދުﷲ ސައީދު
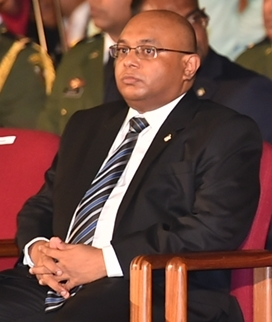
- Saeed in 2016

1st & 3rd Chief Justice of the Maldives
- In office 15 December 2014 – 20 June 2018
- Nominated by: Abdulla Yameen
- Preceded by: Ahmed Faiz
- Succeeded by: Ahmed Abdulla Didi
- In office 18 September 2008 – 10 August 2010
- Nominated by: Maumoon Abdul Gayoom
- Preceded by: Office established
- Succeeded by: Ahmed Faiz

Personal details
- Born: Abdulla Saeed; September 25, 1964 (age 61) Meedhoo, Seenu Atoll, Sultanate of the Maldive Islands
- Education: Al-Azhar University (Sharia And Law, LL.D.)

Abdulla Saeed (Dhivehi: އަބްދުﷲ ސައީދު; born 25 September 1964) is a Maldivian politician, who was the Chief Justice of the Maldives from September 18, 2008 to August 10, 2010 and December 15, 2014 to June 20, 2018.

On February 6, 2018, Chief Justice Abdulla Saeed. alongside Justice Ali Hameed, was arrested under a state of emergency after being accused of trying to overthrow the government.

On May 8, 2018 he was found guilty of trying to obstruct state functions, being accused of ordering the suspension of the government’s e-letter management system (GEMS) to block the delivery of three letters. He lost his seat on the bench after Supreme Court rejected his appeal on June 20, 2018.

== Early life and family ==
Born on the island of Meedhoo (located within Seenu Atoll) on 25 September 1964, Abdulla Saeed is a descendant of the Dhiyamigili Dynasty of the Maldives.

He is the first son of Mohamed Saeed and Maumoona Mohammed Didi. His father, Mohamed Saeed, served as a Khatib of Meedhoo for nearly a decade.

== Career ==
After returning to Maldives in 1995, Saeed began as a state attorney for the attorney general's office. He represented the state in numerous cases and advised the state in legal matters.

In late 2000 he was appointed as the director of Institute of Shari’ah and Law of the Maldives and later became the first Dean of Faculty of Sharia and Law of the Maldives National University.

== Education ==
Saeed's education includes:

- An L.L.B (Combined Honours Degree in Shari’ah and Law) from Al-Azhar University, Cairo, 1994.
- An L.L.M from the International Maritime Law Institute, Malta, 1999.
- A Parliamentary Studies and Legal Drafting course at the Lok Sabha, India, 1997.
- Coursework, national and international seminars and conferences including judicial studies and training programs at Judiciaries in Singapore, Malaysia, and Australia, 2001.
- Effective Dispute Management in a Changing World and An Executive Programme in Negotiation and Mediation, conducted by the Singapore Mediation Centre, Singapore, 2001.
- Seminar on Customer-Oriented Service, organized by the Civil Service College Singapore in cooperation with the Public Service Division at The President’s Office, Male’, 2000.
- Workshop on Aviation Accident Investigation conducted by the Singapore Aviation Academy, Singapore, 16 – 22 February 2000.
- WIPO National Workshop on Intellectual Property and the Agreement on Trade Related Aspects of Intellectual Property Rights (TRIPS Agreement) organized by the World Intellectual Property Organization (WIPO) in cooperation with the Ministry of Trade and Industry, Male’, 1999.
- Workshop on EEZ Management and Maritime Legislation organized by the Economic and Legal Advisory Services Division, Commonwealth Secretariat, in collaboration with the Ministry of Foreign Affairs, Male’, 1995.
