= Sixth Amendment to the Constitution of the Maldives =

2024 constitutional amendment of the Maldives

People's Majlis
- Territorial extent: Maldives
- Enacted by: People's Majlis
- Enacted: 20 November 2024
- Assented to by: President Mohamed Muizzu
- Assented to: 20 November 2024

Legislative history
- Bill title: Bill on amendment to the Constitution
- Introduced by: Mohamed Shahid
- Introduced: 20 November 2024
- Voting summary: 78 voted for; 13 voted against
- Status: Current legislation

The Sixth Amendment to the Constitution of the Maldives was amended on 20 November 2024. This amendment was met with criticism from the Maldivian public and NGOs.

== History ==
The bill was sponsored on behalf of the government by Mohamed Shahid, a People's National Congress (ruling party) member. The bill was passed at 20 November 2024, with an overwhelming majority of 78–13. It was later signed into law in under nine hours by president Mohamed Muizzu in the same day.

== Amendments ==
- Subsection to Article 73: Added subsection e to Article 73 that removes a member of parliament if they defect from the political party they ticketed in, join a party after they were elected as an independent candidate, or voluntarily leave or expelled from that party.
- Subsection to Article 262(b): Requiring public referendum to confirm popular support for laws that changes the country's territory or for constitutional amendments passed by the parliament.
- Amendment to Article 3(a), 3(b): Any modification of the territory of the Maldives must be enacted through a law passed by three-fourths of all members of the parliament.
- Amendment to Article 115(e): Expand the president's powers, granting authority to determine key national policies, provide advice and guidance to state agencies, and formulate national development plans and strategic visions.
- Amendment to Article 251(c); Regulates the use of Maldivian territory for military use by non-nationals. use being only allowed through agreements or arrangements approved by a parliament majority, except for military exercises.

== Reactions ==
Many supporters of the government praised the amendment, including president Muizzu, saying that it was "important decisions for the independence, sovereignty, development and stability of Maldives".

=== Criticism ===
The opposition had said that the bill ignored due process and without consulting with the public, and was submitted late at night so that there was no time for debating among parliament members. Many NGOs made a joint press release, giving concern about this amendment and the hasty process this bill went through to get passed. A case was filed in the Supreme Court seeking to annul the amendment, later which the Maldivian Democratic Party (MDP) joined. The court ruled that the amendment was valid.
