= Ahmed Faiz =

Ahmend Faiz may refer to:

- Ahmed Faiz (athlete), Saudi Arabian long jumper
- Ahmad Faiz, Malaysian cricketer
- Ahmed Faiz Hussain, chief justice of the supreme court of the Maldives
