= Ahmed Muthasim Adnan =

Chief Justice of the Maldives from 2019 to 2025

Ahmed Muthasim Adnan NIIV
- އަޙްމަދު މުޢުތަޞިމް ޢަދުނާން
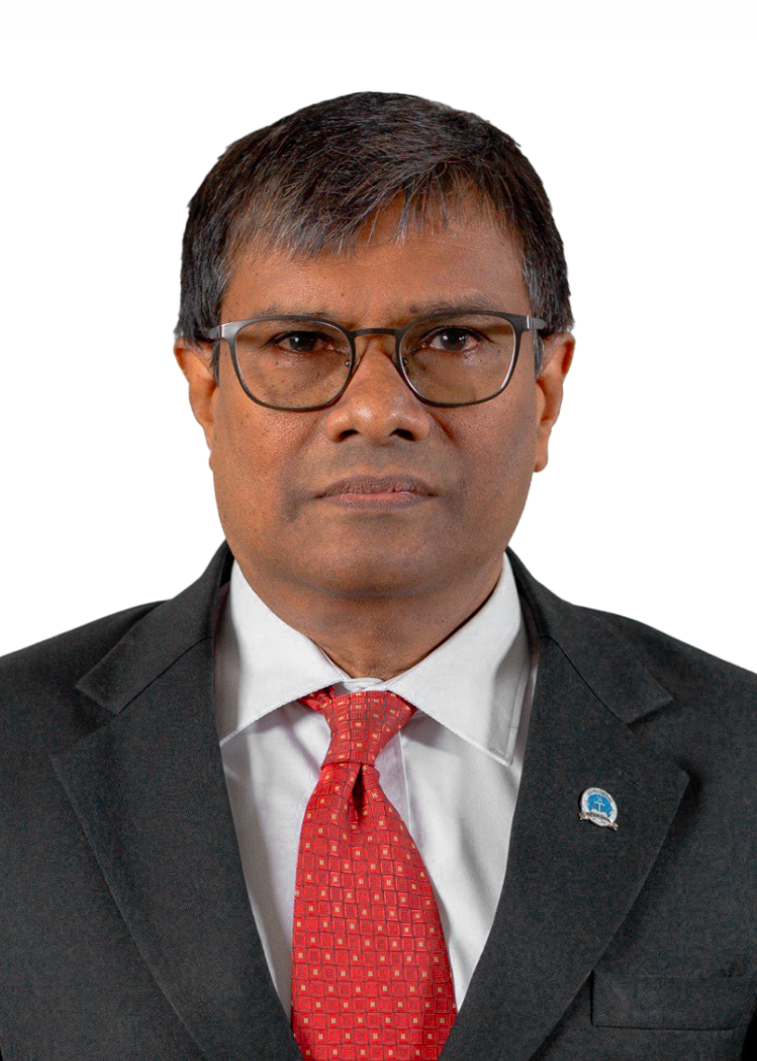
- Adnan in 2025

5th Chief Justice of the Maldives
- In office 8 December 2019 – 21 July 2025
- Nominated by: Ibrahim Mohamed Solih
- President: Ibrahim Mohamed Solih; Mohamed Muizzu
- Preceded by: Ahmed Abdulla Didi
- Succeeded by: Abdul Ghanee Mohamed

Justice of the Supreme Court
- In office 2010–2014
- Nominated by: Mohamed Nasheed
- President: Mohamed Nasheed; Mohamed Waheed Hassan; Abdulla Yameen

Personal details
- Born: 9 February 1965 (age 61) Malé, Maldives
- Spouse: Fathimath Azlifa (m. 1989)
- Relations: Salahuddin family
- Children: 3
- Parent: Adnan Hussain
- Education: University of Glasgow; University of Buckingham (Note: MPhil in Transnational Commercial Law from the University of Glasgow and LLB with honours from the University of Buckingham)
- Website: supremecourt.mv

Ahmed Muthasim Adnan NIIV (Dhivehi: އަޙްމަދު މުޢުތަޞިމް ޢަދުނާން; born 9 February 1965) is a Maldivian lawyer who served as the Chief Justice of the Maldives from 2019 to 2025. He previously served as a Justice of the Supreme Court of the Maldives from 2010 to 2014.

== Early life and education ==
Adnan is the son of former Attorney General of the Maldives, Adnan Hussain and is part of the broader Salahuddin family.

Adnan completed his Bachelor of Laws (Honours) from the University of Buckingham, the United Kingdom and Master of Philosophy in Transnational Commercial Law from the University of Glasgow, the United Kingdom.

== Career ==
Muthasim first started working for the government as the Director of Legal Affairs at the Ministry of Foreign Affairs from 1994 to 2001. He was appointed as the dean of the new Faculty of Sharia and Law at the Maldives National University in 2001, which he served until 2005. From 2005 to 2010, he was a Partner at a law firm as well as a member of the Human Rights Commission of the Maldives, the Law Commission of the Maldives and the Foreign Investment Board of the Maldives. In 2010, he was one of the first Justices nominated by President Mohamed Nasheed for the Supreme Court and in 2019, he was nominated by President Ibrahim Mohamed Solih as the Chief Justice of the Maldives.

Adnan served as a Justice of the Supreme Court from 2010 to 2014 as one of the first justices to sit on the bench with its formation.

In 2025, Adnan submitted a proposal to the Judicial Services Commission (JSC) to retire as Chief Justice. He indicated in February that he'll be retiring this year. His retirement comes amid a constitutional case being heard by the Supreme Court and the dismissal of judges Azmiralda Zahir and Mahaz Ali Zahir. Adnan later stepped down on 21 July 2025.

On 27 July 2025, he was awarded the Order of Izzuddin by president Mohamed Muizzu.
