= Eco Garden (disambiguation) =

Eco Garden is an ecological wetland park in the Maldives.

Eco Garden may also refer to:

- Eco Gardens Lucknow, Ecological gardens in Lucknow city.

== See also ==
- Eco Park, New Town
