= Drug Court of the Maldives =

- ދިވެހިރާއްޖޭގެ ޑްރަގް ކޯޓު
- Established: 31 December 2011
- Jurisdiction: Maldives
- Location: Drug Court, Izzuddeen Magu, Malé, Maldives
- Authorised by: People's Majlis via the Drug Act 2011
- Appeals to: High Court
- Judge term length: Life tenure
- Number of positions: 5 judges
- Annual budget: MVR 3k
- Language: Dhivehi
- Website: drugcourt.gov.mv

Chief Judge
- Currently: Abdul Sattar Abdul Hameed
- Since: 2018

Chief Justice of the Maldives
- Currently: Abdul Ghanee Mohamed
- Since: 6 August 2025

The Drug Court of the Maldives (Dhivehi: ދިވެހިރާއްޖޭގެ ޑްރަގް ކޯޓު) is a drug court responsible to hear and dispose of criminal cases of drug dependent persons, and subject those persons to mandatory treatment and drug rehabilitation.

== History ==
The Drug Court was established under Article 34(a) of the Drug Act 2011. It was created to handle drug-related offenses and to help provide an effective way of addressing drug problems in the archipelago. On 23 February 2012, the first judges of the court was sworn in and the court officially commenced operations on 28 June 2012.

== Judges ==
The court currently consists of 5 judges:

- Abdul Sattar Abdul Hameed (Chief Judge)
- Mohamed Sameer
- Hussain Shahamath Maahiru
- Mohamed Naeem
- Adam Arif

== Committees ==
There are 7 committees in the Drug Court:

- Harassment Committee
- Recreation Committee
- Whistleblower Committee
- Bid Committee
- Bid Evaluation Committee
- Review Committee
- Human Resources Development Committee
