= Hulhudhoo =

Hulhudhoo may refer to several places in the Maldives:

- Hulhudhoo (Addu), an administrative division of Hulhumeedhoo, Addu Atoll
- Hulhudhoo (Baa Atoll), an uninhabited island
- Holhudhoo (Noonu Atoll), an inhabited island
- Hulhudhoo (Raa Atoll), an uninhabited island of Raa Atoll
