= Knaul =

Knaul is a surname. Notable people with the surname include:

- Felicia Knaul (born 1966), British-Canadian health economist
- Gabriela Knaul (fl. 2009–2015), Brazilian lawyer
