= Kōgaṇṇu =

Cemetery in the Maldives

Kogannu
- ކޯގަންޱު (Dhivehi)
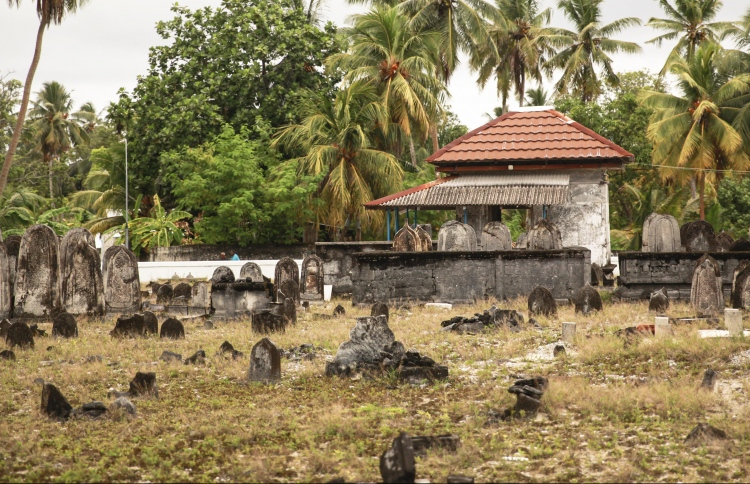
- Kogannu Cemetery

- Location in the Maldives
- 0°34′52″S 73°13′43″E
- Location: Meedhoo, Addu City, Addu Atoll, Maldives

History
- Built: 900 years ago (between 1101-1200 CE) 12th century
- Original use: Cemetery

Site notes
- Current use: Cemetery

Kōgaṇṇu (Dhivehi: ކޯގަންޱު) is the oldest and the biggest cemetery in the Maldives. Kōgaṇṇu cemetery is located in Meedhoo in Addu City.

== History ==
The cemetery was built about 900 years ago for the purpose of burying the first Muslims of Addu Atoll. It was built by Chief Justice Mohamed Shamsuddine and his three sons after being exiled from Male' by Sultan Mohamed Imaduddin I after failing to completely praise the Sultan. The largest tombstone in the country is also found in this cemetery. It is believed that this tombstone dates back to the 18th century and belongs to one of the royals of the Maldives. Many historical writings of Maldives are found in Kōgaṇṇu.

The cemetery has 1,535 tombstones and its believed that Queen Khadijah is buried in this cemetery, as well as Yoosuf Naib, the person who converted the people of Meedhoo to Islam and his supporters, and Chief Justice Mohamed Shamsuddin. Kogannu also has 227 monuments.

In 2017, some tombstones of Kogannu were vandalized and the Maldives Police Service sought to appeal an order by the Magistrate Court to protect the cemetery after claiming that it lacks people to be stationed there 24/7.

Kōgaṇṇu is listed on the 2022 World Monuments Watch and is currently under process of receiving the World Heritage status.

== Architecture ==
The tombstones, mausolea and additional mosques were constructed from coral cut from the shallow reefs around the island.

== See also ==
- Meedhoo (Addu)
