= Vaikaradhoo =

Vaikaradhoo ވައިކަރަދޫ
- Island
- Location in Maldives
- Coordinates: 06°32′52″N 72°57′10″E
- Country: Maldives
- Geographic atoll: Thiladhummathi Atoll
- Administrative atoll: Haa Dhaalu Atoll
- Distance to Malé: 269.5 km (167.5 mi)

Dimensions
  - Length: 1.300 km (0.808 mi)
  - Width: 0.690 km (0.429 mi)

Population (2022)
  - Total: 776
- Time zone: UTC+05:00 (MST)

Vaikaradhoo (Dhivehi: ވައިކަރަދޫ) is one of the inhabited islands of Haa Dhaalu Atoll administrative division of the Maldives.

== History ==
Maamiskiyy Tharaagandu, located close to Virares office, is believed to be the second oldest mosque used as both cemetery and mosque. Present archaeological evidence predicts that it was built between the 15th and 17th centuries, and it was built in the center of their village allowing the villagers to access the mosque with ease. In addition, the place had coconut trees, bread and fruit trees which were grown domestically.

The ruins of a hawaitta (archaeological mounds) known locally as the Jaadi Valhulithan stand on the western periphery of the island. The larger of the two mounds measures 55 by 75 feet. The apparent remains of a mosque created by early inhabitants of Vaikaradhoo are found on the nearby uninhabited island of Vaikaramuraidhoo. A cemetery and a well are found in close proximity to the site.

Contains a rock called gumbaru bodu gaa meaning membaru bodu gaa, on which people used it as a standing place when they gave huthubaa on fridays. It has wonderful stone carvings carved in arab. the rock is located in the west forest near the west farming area.

== Geography ==
The island is 269.5 km (167 mi; 146 nmi) north of the country's capital, Malé.

Geographically, it is part of Thiladhunmathi in the north of the Maldives. It is a medium-sized agricultural community by Maldivian standards. Vaikaradhoo was one of the islands severely damaged by the great cyclone of 1821 that hit the northern atolls of the Maldives.

== Demography ==
Historical population
Year	Pop.	±%
2006	923	—
2014	746	−19.2%
2022	776	+4.0%
2006-2014: Census populations Source:

== Governance ==
Vaikaradhoo MDP Candidate won a majority in Secretariat of The Vaikaradhoo Council 2017. The candidates were Abdulla Wafir, Ahmed Naseem, Ibrahim Mohamed.

In 2011, the local council election was won by candidates of the ruling Maldivian Democratic Party, including Abdullah Nishan, Ahmed Waheed (President), Abdullah Shareef (Vice President), Ali Amir and Adam Shahid.

== Education ==
After World War II, the island became notable for a high literacy rate and awareness of general knowledge. Schools were built to teach Quran, essential religious concepts, and Arabic. Most of the teachers were local people familiar with the Arabic language. In 1984, with the help of Japanese grants to Maldives, five schools were built with administrative offices and lodging. Students were admitted to grade one who were 6 and half to 7 years old. Students above 7 years old were admitted into "special classes". At the time, there was no special curriculum for them.

In 1989 new school master Mr. Hussain Hassan made arrangements to discontinue special classes, allowing the students to enter grade classes according to their qualification. Soon grade 6 and grade 7 were introduced to the school. After two years, Mr. Hussain Hassan left for another island. In 1994, school management introduced grade 8 to the school. In some cases, students were held in the same grade for more than four years in hopes of joining eighth grade. The dream was realized in 1996, when they introduced 8th grade commerce stream. In the year 2013 higher secondary education was introduced with five students.

=== Obstacles ===
Substandard educators and management officials are a major risk to current education on the island. Some employees with long tenures were trained as temporary teachers and were promoted without looking at their academic qualifications. The government allocates a budget for educational activities to be controlled by school management. There are rumors that allocated budgets are incompletely spent almost every year. While students are in need of extra help and facilities, funds are given back to the government.

== Economy ==
The island specialized in producing a few varieties of short-term crops, including watermelon, scotch bonnet pepper, green chili, papaya, taro, and pumpkin. From the beginning of the 19th century, they were the largest producer of finger millets in the country, which helped them to stave off starvation during World War II. Finger millet (Binbi) and screwpine (Kashi-keyo) fruits were largely traded between Raa atoll people in exchange of goods or money.

Among the inhabitants Agriculture is largely practiced as a hobby. Island administration gives each residence a certain area for agricultural purposes. Also it is the main source of income for the inhabitants.

== Media and socialization ==
Being an isolated small island, its inhabitants know each other very well. Mass social gatherings are common, especially for weddings and birthday ceremonies. In 2003, cable TV service was introduced to the island by a private operator for less than $7.00 per month. service was discontinued after couple of years. In 2009, people started to use "AirTell" satellite dishes to watch the TV shows.

=== Online media ===
Since 2005, two online newspapers have been published. "Vaikaradhoo Live" contributed to the overthrowing of dictator Maumoon Abdul Qayoom. After the successful attempt to collapse the government in 2008, the owner decided to cease the news. In late 2010, "Vaikaradhoo Live" emerged, claiming the team is back with new hopes. Four new websites came into existence at www.uthuru.com, www.vaikaradhoolive.com, www.vaikaradhoo.com and www.jaadi.net.
