= Hulhudhoo (Addu) =

Hulhudhoo (Dhivehi: ހުޅުދޫ) is the third most populous island in Addu Atoll. It is located on the north-east side of the atoll adjoining the island of Meedhoo to the north. The island is approximately 530 km south of Male' City, the capital of Maldives. Hulhudhoo has a population of 3,687 people (2017). In the vaguely defined border dividing the island into two constituencies, Hulhudhoo is the southern half of Hulhumeedhoo. Hulhudhoo means "small island" with hulhu being the modern form of old dhivehi word "sulhu" meaning small.

Hulhudhoo spreads to an area of around 1.05 km^{2}. Hulhudhoo's landscape is mainly of palms trees and thick tropical vegetation as in other islands of the atoll. The island consists of small roads, close lanes, large number of closely built houses, only a few have a second floor, green vegetation surrounds most of the housing compounds, specially banana trees and in some households there are even taro (އަލަ) fields within the housing compound. This vegetation is regarded as part domestic agriculture and is often sent to Male' to local market.

To the south of Hulhudhoo is Herathera. An uninhabited section of the island which is located to the south, within the lagoon of Hulhudhoo. This island is linked with Hulhudhoo by bridge. The island of Maafishi, which is also located on the south of Hulhudhoo.

Historical population
Year	Pop.	±%
2014	900	—
2022	1,182	+31.3%
2024	3,763	+218.4%
2014-2022-2024: Census populations Source:
