= Aisha Shujune Muhammad =

Maldivian jurist and judge (born 1977)

- ޢާއިޝާ ޝުޖޫން މުޙައްމަދު

Justice of the Supreme Court of the Maldives
- Incumbent
- Assumed office 4 September 2019

Personal details
- Born: 23 December 1977 (age 48) Malé, Maldives
- Education: University of London; University of Western Australia

Aisha Shujune Muhammad (Dhivehi: ޢާއިޝާ ޝުޖޫން މުޙައްމަދު; born 23 December 1977) is a Maldivian jurist and judge. She has been justice of the Supreme Court of the Maldives since 2019.

Alongside Huzaifa Mohamed she became the first female judge of the country in 2007 and alongside Azmiralda Zahir, she was the first female justice of the Supreme Court in 2019. She previously served at the United Nations Subcommittee on Prevention of Torture,

== Early life and education ==
Aisha Shujune Muhammad was born on 23 December 1977 in Malé, Maldives. She obtained her law degree through the University of London’s external programme at the Royal Institute in Colombo, Sri Lanka, and a Master’s degree in law from the University of Western Australia in Perth.

== Career ==
Her professional career began in 1997, firstly working as lawyer at Associate Partner at Nasheed & Co Law Practice and later becoming judge. Alongside Huzaifa Mohamed, she became the first female judge of the Maldives in 2007, and resigned in 2015. Shujune Muhammad has built up am international track record in the field of human rights through her involvement in the United Nations Subcommittee on Prevention of Torture (SPT). Between 2011 and 2018, she held the posts of Vice-Chair responsible for Case Law and Rapporteur of the SPT, contributing to the development of the body’s activities. She was subsequently re-elected as a member of the Subcommittee for the 2021–2024 term, during which she served as Vice-Chair responsible for National Preventive Mechanisms, and again in 2024. In 2025, she was re-elected as Vice-Chair and Rapporteur of the SPT for a two-year term.

Between 2019 and 2024, Muhammad was a member of the Maldives Judicial Service Commission and served on various advisory bodies within the legal sector. She also sat on the Advisory Councils of the Faculty of Sharia and Law at the Maldives National University and the Maldives Judicial Academy during the period 2021–2024. Until 2019, she worked at the Bar Council.

In summer 2019, Maldivian president Ibrahim Mohamed Solih nominated Muhammad and Azmiralda Zahir as the first female justices of the Supreme Court of the Maldives. On 3 September 2019 the People's Majlis approved their nomination with 62 votes in favour, 1 against and 1 abstention. She was sworn in the following day by chief justice Ahmed Abdulla Didi.
