= Civil Court of the Maldives =

Maldivian court of justice

Civil Court
- ސިވިލް ކޯޓު
- Established: 21 October 2010
- Jurisdiction: All civil except family cases
- Location: Justice Building, (Ground floor, Second floor Third floor), Maldives
- Appeals to: High Court of Maldives
- Judge term length: life tenure
- Number of positions: Isgaazee (އިސްޤާޟީ), Gaazee (ޤާޟީ)
- Language: Dhivehi (ދިވެހި)
- Website: https://civilcourt.gov.mv/

Isgaazee (އިސްޤާޟީ)
- Currently: Mariyam Waheedh

Civil Court of Maldives is a superior court established under the "Courts of Maldives Act (22/2010)". This court has jurisdiction in the first instance in all civil cases except family cases. Until the establishment of the Civil Court, cases within the jurisdiction were heard by the "madhanee court" established on 1 August 1997.

== Judges of the court ==
As of 13 August 2026. there are 19 judges (Gaazee or ޤާޟީ) including the Chief Judge of the Civil Court (އިސްޤާޟީ). They are:

- Chief Judge Al-Ustadha Mariyam Waheedh
- Judge Al-Ustadh Faruhaadh Rasheed
- Judge Al-Ustadh Hassan Faheem Ibrahim
- Judge Al-Ustadh Ali Abdullah
- Judge Al-Ustadh Abdul Nasir Shafeeq
- Judge Al-Ustadha Hafiza Abdul Sattar
- Judge Al-Ustadh Ahmed Rasheed
- Judge Al-Ustadh Ahmed Abdul Matheen
- Judge Al-Ustadha Aishath Azfa Abdul Ghafoor
- Judge Al-Ustadh Fayyaz Shaathir
- Judge Al-Ustadha Rizmeena Idhrees
- Judge Al-Ustadha Zulaikha Sheeza
- Judge Al-Ustadh Faisal Adam
- Judge Al-Ustadh Sinaan Ali
- Judge Al-Ustadh Abdullah Ihsaan
- Judge Al-Ustadh Mohamed Easafulhu
- Judge Al-Ustadh Adam Zaalif
- Judge Al-Ustadh Mohamed Nishaath
- Judge Al-Ustadha Asiya Azeema
