= Ahmed Abdulla Didi =

Maldivian politician (born 1966)

4th Chief Justice of the Maldives
- In office 28 June 2018 – 18 November 2019
- Nominated by: Abdulla Yameen
- Preceded by: Abdulla Saeed
- Succeeded by: Ahmed Muthasim Adnan

Personal details
- Born: Ahmed Abdulla Didi; October 1, 1966 (age 60) Addu Atoll, Hithadhoo, Maldives
- Education: Al-Azhar University (Public International Law, Ph.D)

Dr. Ahmed Abdulla Didi (born 1 October 1966) is the 4th Chief Justice of the Maldives, served from June 28, 2018, till December 8, 2019.

== Early life ==
Dr. Ahmed Abdhulla Didi was born in S. Hithadhoo, Republic of Maldives on 1 October 1966.

== Education & Career ==
After completing Secondary Certificate of Al-Azhar at Cairo Preparatory and Secondary Institute, he completed his bachelor's degree in Sharia & Law at Al-Azhar University in 1993.

Prior to his appointment to Supreme Court of the Maldives in 2010, he worked at Attorney General's office as Deputy Attorney General from 2008 to 2009 as well as Counsel General of the People's Majlis in 2010.

He was nominated to Supreme Court by President Mohamed Nasheed and the Majlis confirmed his nomination on August 10, 2010.

After Chief Justice Abdulla Saeed was disqualified from Supreme Court bench on June 20, 2018, President Abdulla Yameen nominated Justice Dr.Ahmed Abdulla Didi as the new Chief Justice, his nomination was confirmed by the Majlis on June 28, 2010.
