= Juvenile Court of the Maldives =

Maldivian court of justice

Juvenile Court
- ޖުވެނައިލް ކޯޓު
- Established: 1 August 1997 (kudakudhinnaabehey court), 21 October 2010 (Juvenile Court)
- Jurisdiction: Juvenile cases
- Location: M.Maathila, Haveeree Hingun, Malé 20218
- Appeals to: High Court of Maldives
- Judge term length: life tenure
- Number of positions: Isgaazee (އިސްޤާޟީ) Gaazee (ޤާޟީ)
- Language: Dhivehi (ދިވެހި)
- Website: https://juvenilecourt.gov.mv

އިސްޤާޟީ
- Currently: Saeed Ibrahim

Juvenile Court of Maldives is a superior court established under the "Courts of Maldives Act (22/2010)" on 21 October 2010. This court was first established on 1 August 1997 under the name "kudakudhinnaabehey court" to address the increase in crimes committed by children and to resolve the societal issues that arises due to it, and to address that in the "Protecting the rights of Children Act (9/91)" it is mentioned that a separate system should be established to hear cases involving children.

== Judges of the Court ==
As of now there are 3 judges (ޤާޟީ) including the Chief Judge of the court (އިސްޤާޟީ). They are:

- Chief Judge Al-Ustadh Saeed Ibrahim
- Judge Al-Ustadh Ahmed Shareef
- Judge Al-Ustadha Mariyam Taifa.
