= Fifth Amendment to the Constitution of the Maldives =

2019 constitutional amendment of the Maldives

People's Majlis
- Territorial extent: Maldives
- Enacted by: People's Majlis
- Enacted: 8 December 2019
- Assented to by: President Ibrahim Mohamed Solih
- Assented to: 8 December 2019

Legislative history
- Bill title: Bill on amendment to the Constitution
- Introduced by: Mohamed Aslam
- Introduced: 8 October 2019
- Preliminary reading: 28 October 2019
- Voting summary: 82 voted for; 1 present not voting
- First reading: 3 December 2019
- Voting summary: 66 voted for; 9 present not voting
- Second reading: 3 December 2019
- Voting summary: 66 voted for; 9 present not voting
- Third reading: 3 December 2019
- Voting summary: 69 voted for; 6 present not voting
- Status: Current legislation

The Fifth Amendment to the Constitution of the Maldives was amended on 8 December 2019. This amendment states the terms for the councils as well as voting for members of the council.

== History ==
The bill was sponsored by Mohamed Aslam on 8 October 2019. The bill later passed in the People's Majlis, with an overwhelming support on 3 December 2019. President Ibrahim Mohamed Solih ratified it on 8 December 2019.

== Amendments ==
- Article 231(a) states that Island Council Members and City Council Members are to be elected by conducting elections in which constituents of the district will cast their vote.
- Article 231(a)(3) states that the administrative district's council will be composed of the Presidents of the Local Island Councils and President of the Atoll Council.
- Article 231(b) states that Presidents and Mayors of the Islands, Atolls and Cities will be elected by the constituents of their respective constituency.
- Article 231(c) states that the term for the councils is 5 years.
