= Stone carving in Odisha =

Ancient stone sculpting practice

Konark Stone Carving
- Geographical indication
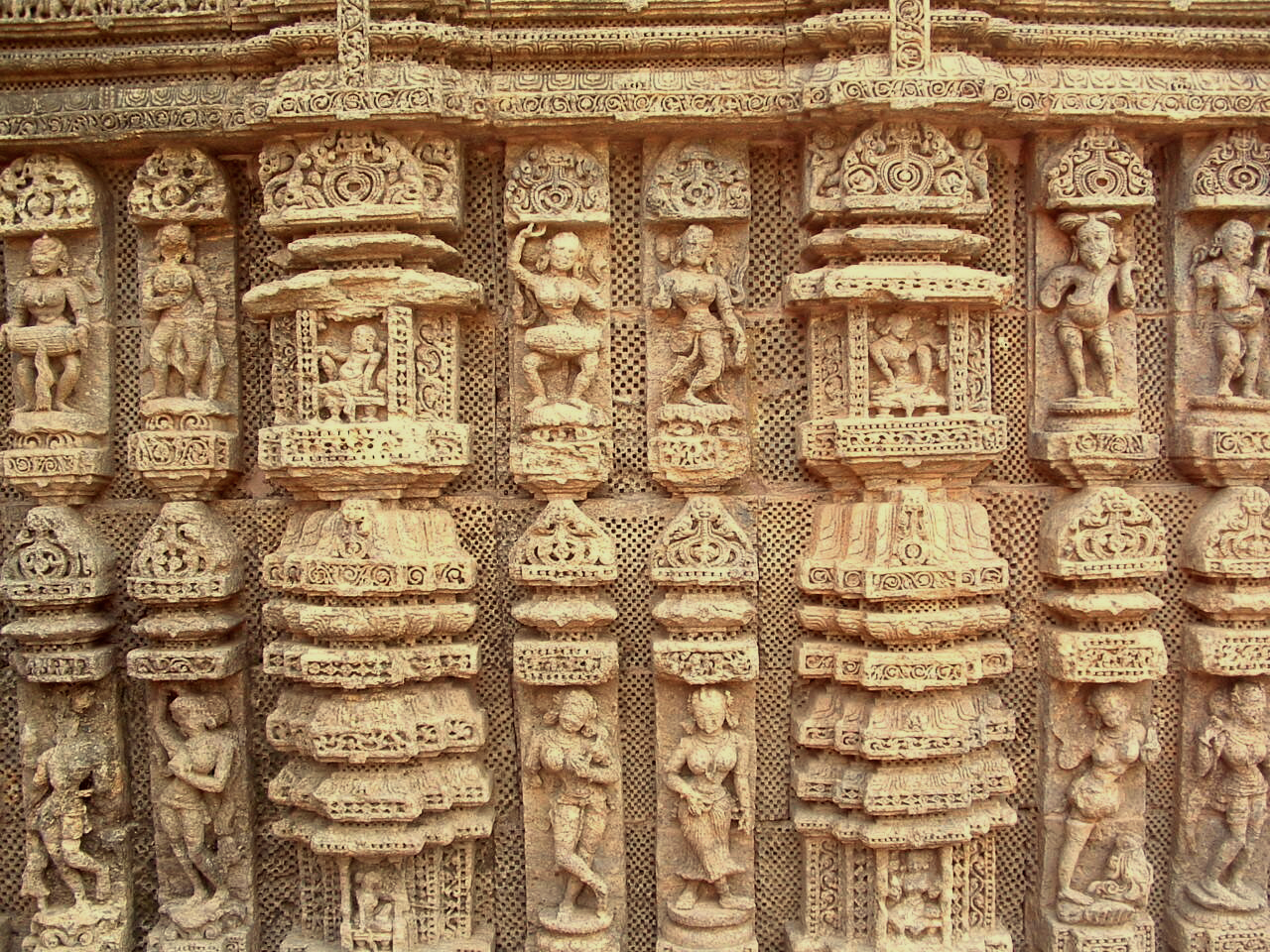
- Alternative names: Konark Stone Carving (କୋଣାର୍କ ପଥର ଖୋଦେଇ)
- Type: Handcraft, Stone
- Area: Konark, Puri district, Odisha
- Country: India
- Material: Handcraft

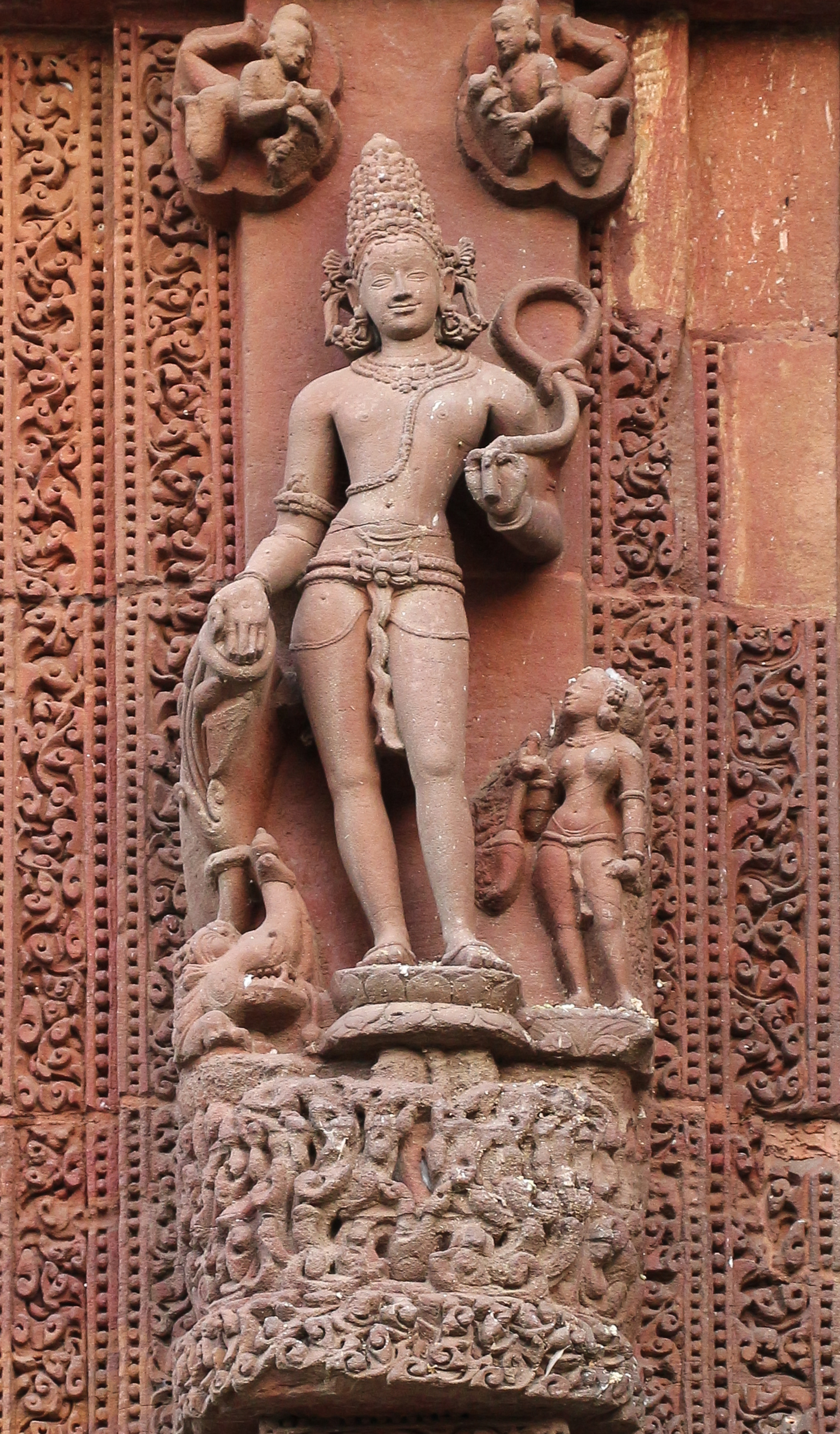
Varuna Sculpture Rajarani Temple, Bhubaneswar

Stone carving in Odisha is the ancient practice of sculpting stone into art and utilitarian objects. It is an ancient practice in the Indian state of Odisha. Stone carving is practiced by artisans mainly in Puri, Bhubaneswar and Lalitgiri in the Cuttack district, though some carvings can be found in Khiching in the Mayurbhanj District. Stone carving is one of the major handcrafts of Odisha. The art form primarily consists of custom carved works, with the Sun Temple of Konark and its intricate sculpture and delicate carvings on the red vivid sandstone exemplifying the practice. Other noteworthy monuments include the Stupas of Udayagiri and Ratnagiri and the temples at Jagannath, Lingaraj, Mukteshwar and as well as other temples in the region.

== Stones ==
Sandstone, soapstone, serpentinite, Makrana marble, and granite were used in Konark stone carving. Skillful artists may use the soft, white soapstone, khadipathara, or the slightly harder greenish chlorite or kochilapathara. Rocks such as the pinkish khandolite, sahanapathara or baulapathara and the hardest of all, black granite and muguni pathara are commonly used.

== Procedure ==
An outline of sorts is first drawn on the cut-to-size stone. Once the outline is engraved, the final figure is brought out by removing the unwanted portions. For the harder stones, this is done by chiseling out the extra material. With softer stones, it is done by scraping out the extra material with a sharp flat-edged iron tool. Hammers and chisels of various sizes are used (e.g., the muna, patili, martual, thuk-thuki and nitana).

== Products ==
Subjects are often traditional images, including mythological figures. Utilitarian items like candle stands, pen stands, paperweights, bookends, lamp bases and stoneware utensils are also created. Turning and polishing with a wooden lathe called Kunda, the craftsmen produce beautiful polished plates (thali), containers (gina, pathuri), cups and glasses. These are used for pujas, ritual worships and for daily eating. Stoneware containers are particularly good for storing curd as they do not react to acid. They are also filled with water and used for holding the legs of wooden almirahs to keep out the ants.

== Gallery ==
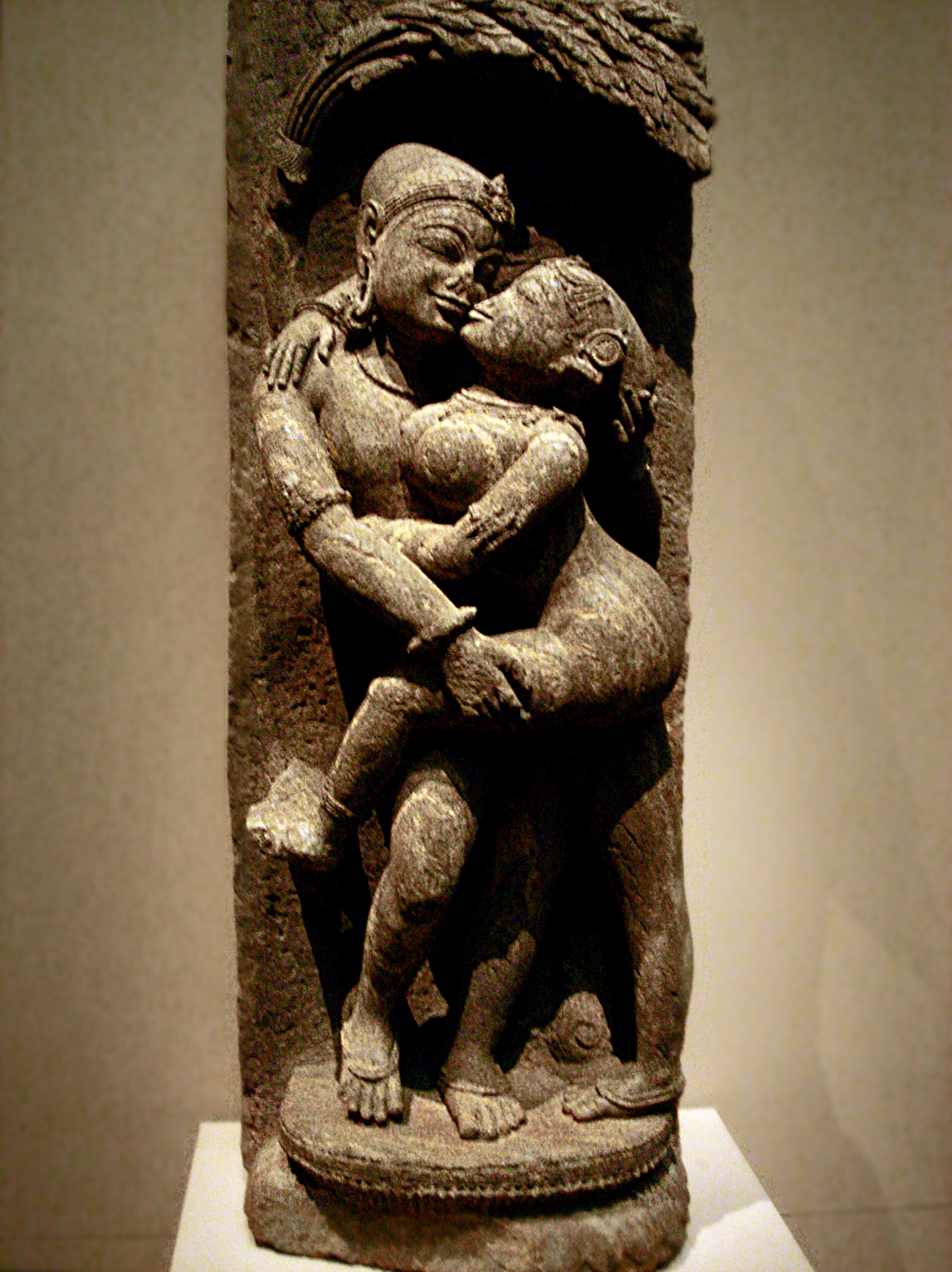
Loving Maithuna Sculpture - 13th century Eastern ganga dynasty

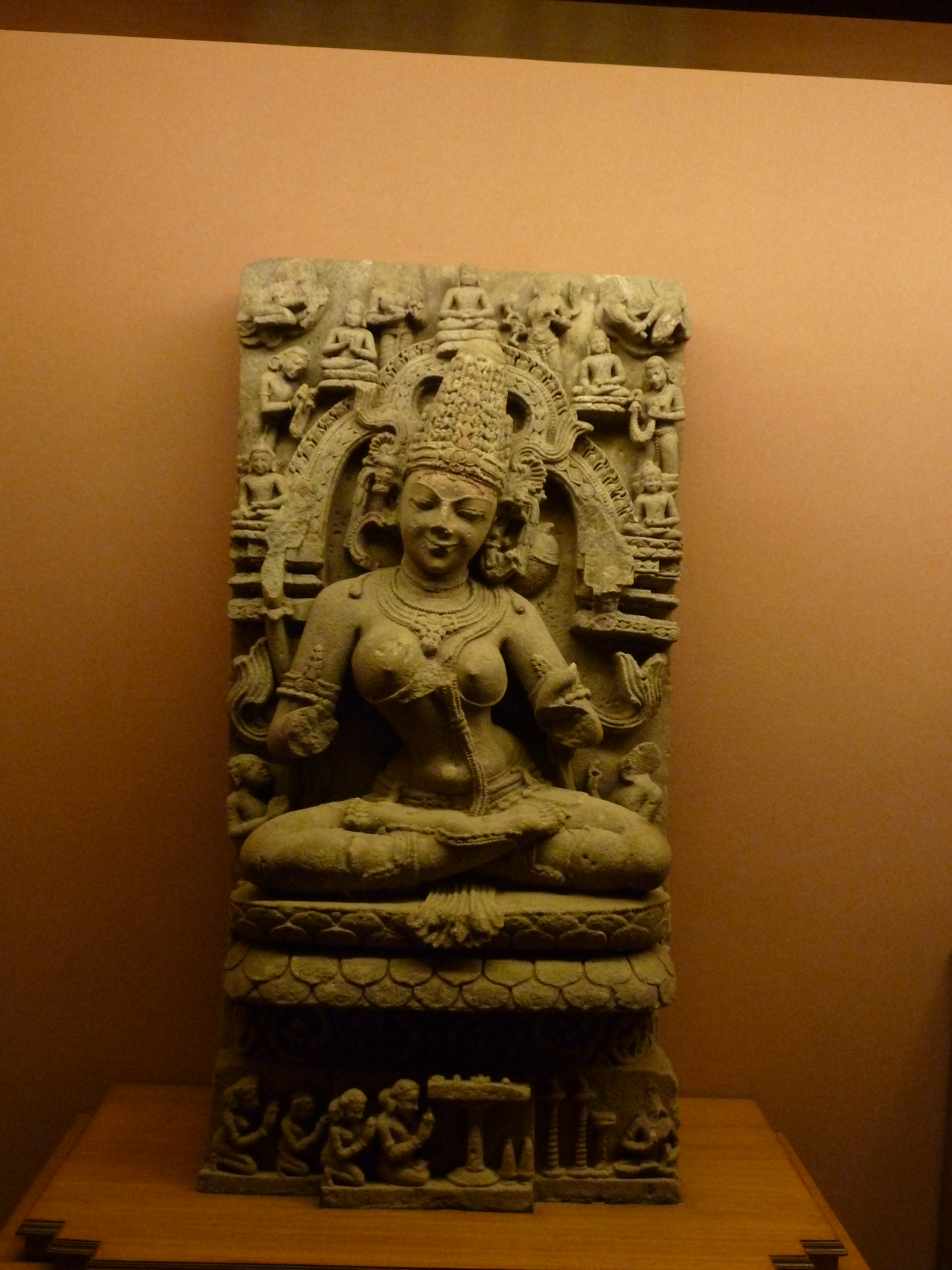
Sculpture art from Odisha

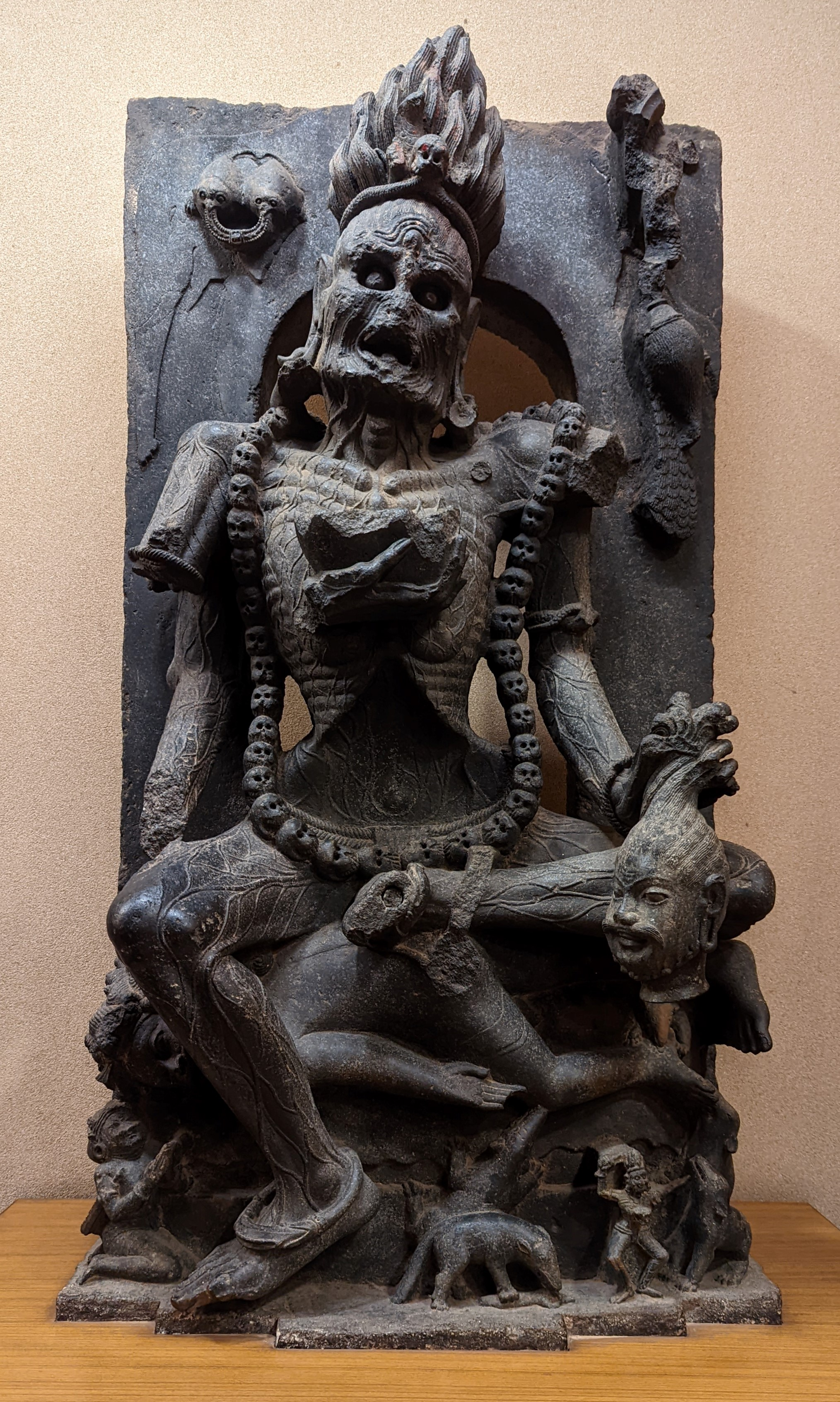
Chamunda 8th century CE at Odisha State Museum, Bhubaneswar, Odisha, India

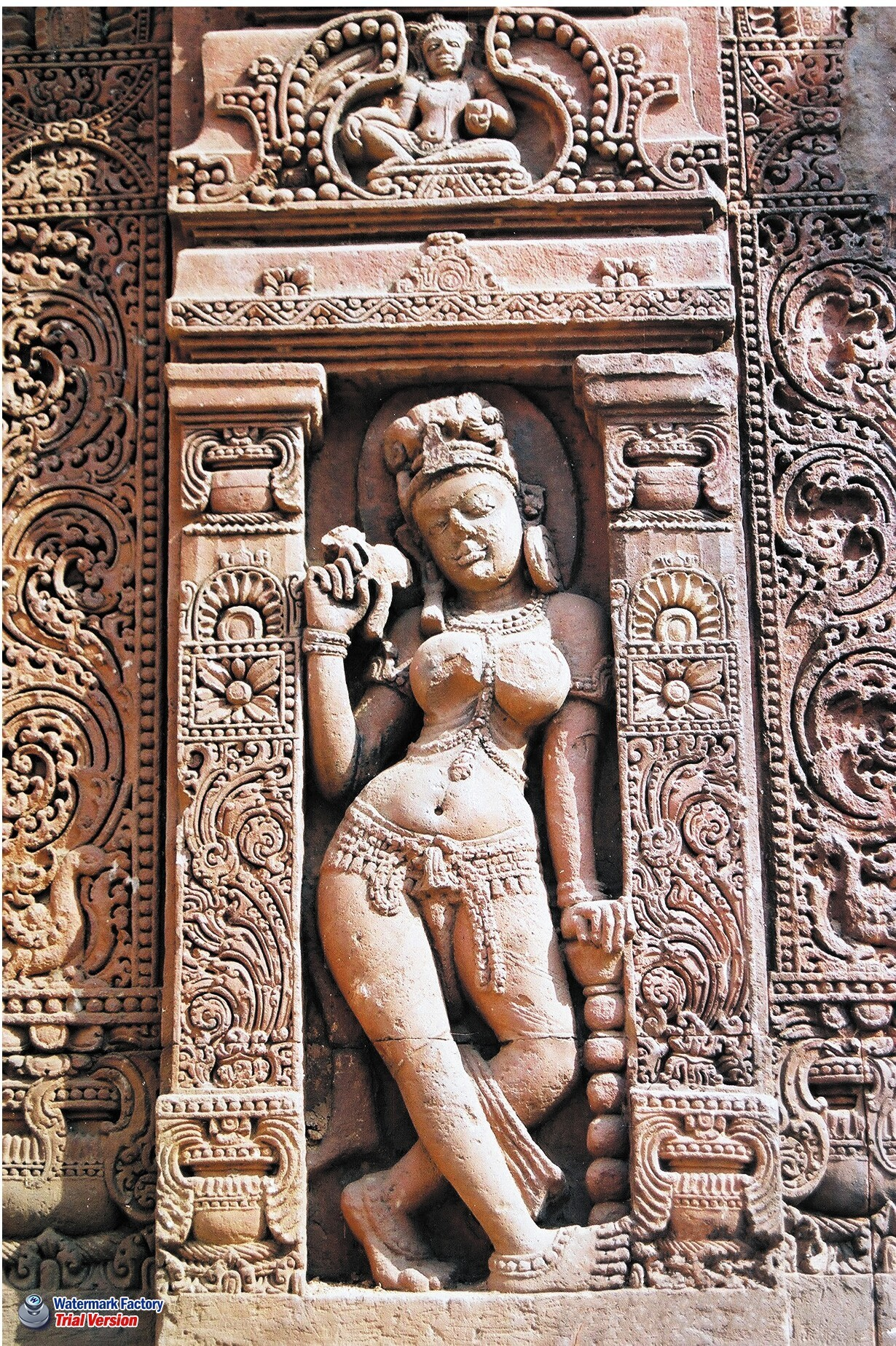
Sculpture of Alasa Kanya at Vaital Deul, Bhubaneswar
