= Judicature Act 2010 =

Legislation of the Maldives

Judicature Act

People's Majlis
- Territorial extent: Maldives
- Enacted by: People's Majlis
- Assented to by: President Mohamed Nasheed
- Commenced: 21 October 2010
- Voting summary: 50 voted for; 4 voted against; 6 abstained
- Status: In force

The Judicature Act (Law no: 22/2010) is a law enacted by the People's Majlis and signed into law by President Mohamed Nasheed on 21 October 2010. The bill was passed in parliament following 50 in favour, 4 against, and 6 abstaining.

== Amendments ==
=== First amendment ===
The bill to amend the Judicature Act was sponsored in parliament by Ibrahim Shareef, eventually being signed into law by president Abdulla Yameen on 11 December 2014. The Supreme Court bench decreased from 7 to 5 judges.

=== Second amendment ===
President Abdulla Yameen signed the second amendment into law on 17 June 2017. Following the amendment, the judges of the High Court changed to 11, composing a chief judge, and 10 additional judges.

=== Third amendment ===
President Ibrahim Mohamed Solih signed the third amendment on 23 July 2019. Following this, the amendment overturned the first amendment and increased the Supreme Court bench back to 7 judges. President Solih appointed Azmiralda Zahir and Aisha Shujune Muhammad as the new judges.

=== Fourth amendment ===
President Ibrahim Mohamed Solih signed the fourth amendment into law on 17 July 2022. This amendment dissolved the North and South branches of the High Court and stipulates that all the judges will be based in Malé.

=== Fifth amendment ===
On 24 February 2025, MP Abdul Sattar Mohamed proposed a new bill to remove 2 judges from the Supreme Court. The bill stipulates that the Judicial Service Commission (JSC) will decide two judges that are removed and the parliament will either approve or deny the approval. Opposition parties such as the Maldivian Democratic Party and The Democrats condemned the government and called on the government to withdraw the bill. The bill was later accepted at parliament along with the parliament's Judiciary Committee. Many lawyers had submitted a 62 signature petition against the bill and asked the government to reconsider the bill. President Mohamed Muizzu sent the bill back to parliament for further reconsideration.
