= High Court of the Maldives =

High court of the Republic of Maldives

- ދިވެހިރާއްޖޭގެ ހައިކޯޓު
- Established: 5 October 1980
- Jurisdiction: Maldives
- Location: Theemuge, Malé, Maldives
- Authorised by: Constitution of the Maldives
- Appeals to: Supreme Court
- Appeals from: Criminal Court, Civil Court, Family Court, Drug Court, Juvenile Court, Employment Tribunals and Magistrate Courts
- Judge term length: Life tenure
- Number of positions: 11 judges - 1 Chief Judge (އިސްފަނޑިޔާރު) and 10 Judges (ފަނޑިޔާރު)
- Annual budget: MVR 170k (2024)
- Language: Dhivehi
- Website: highcourt.gov.mv

Chief Judge (Isfan'diyaaru - އިސްފަނޑިޔާރު)
- Currently: Abdullah Jameel Moosa

The High Court of the Maldives (Dhivehi: ދިވެހިރާއްޖޭގެ ހައިކޯޓު, romanized: dhivehiraajjeyge haikoatu) is the high court of the Republic of Maldives.

== History ==
On 5 October 1980, President Maumoon Abdul Gayoom established a court in every island of the Maldives with the aim of increasing trust and established the High Court. The judges were appointed the day after the High Court was established. The High Court was previously the highest court in the country until the ratification of the 2008 Constitution which lead to the creation of the Supreme Court of the Maldives.

== Judges ==
Under Article 27 of the Maldives Court Act, the High Court has 11 judges:

- Abdulla Jameel Moosa
- Hussain Mazeed
- Hassan Shafeeu
- Fathimath Farheezaa
- Huzaifaa Mohamed
- Dheebaanaz Fahmee
- Mohamed Shaneez Abdulla
- Abdul Maaniu Hussain
- Ibrahim Mahir
- Ismail Shafeeu
- Abdul Raoof Ibrahim

== Notable rulings ==
- The High Court ruled that Aishath Rasheed was wrongfully dismissed from her job at Maldives Police Services and ruled that she were to be reinstated along with six months salary in compensation for losses incurred.

== See also ==
- Judiciary of the Maldives
- Chief Justice of the Maldives
