= Gabriela Knaul =

Brazilian lawyer

Gabriela Knaul is a Brazilian lawyer. She is a judge who was the UN Special Rapporteur on the Independence of Judges and Lawyers from 2009 until 2015.
