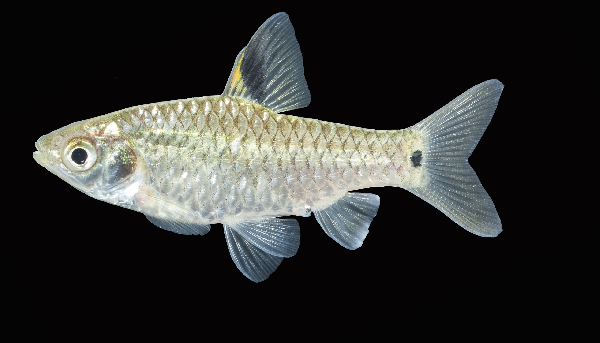

Conservation status
- Least Concern (IUCN 3.1)

Scientific classification
- Kingdom: Animalia
- Phylum: Chordata
- Class: Actinopterygii
- Order: Cypriniformes
- Family: Cyprinidae
- Subfamily: Smiliogastrinae
- Genus: Bhava; Hiranya Sudasinghe, Lukas Rüber & Madhava Meegaskumbura, 2023
- Species: B. vittata

Binomial name
- Bhava vittata (Day, 1865)

Synonyms
- Puntius vittatus Day, 1865; Barbus vittatus (Day, 1865)

= Greenstripe barb =

Species of fish

The greenstripe barb, silver barb or striped barb (Bhava vittata) is a tropical freshwater and brackish ray-finned fish belonging to the family Cyprinidae, the family which includes the carps, barbs and related fishes. This species is found in South Asia. It is the only species in the monospecific genus Bhava.

== Taxonomy ==
The greenstripe barb was first formally descripted as Puntius vittatus in 1865 by the British military surgeon and naturalist Francis Day with its type locality given as Cochin In 2023 Hiranya Sudasinghe, Lukas Rüber and Madhava Meegaskumbura proposed the new monotypic genus, Bhava, for this species. This taxon is classified within the subfamily Smiliogastrinae within the family Cyprinidae. The wide distribution of this taxon may indicate that it is a species complex rather than a single species.

== Etymology ==
The greenstripe barb is the only member of the genus Bhava, a word on Pali or Sanskrit means "existence or being", an allusion the authors did not explain. The specific name, vittata, means "banded", an allusion to the stripe on the rear part of the dorsal fin in individuals over 2 cm (0.79 in) in length.

== Description ==
The greenstripe barb has black dots on the dorsal, caudal and anal fins. The dot on the dorsal fin is elongated into a band. They young are more stripey. The overall colour is silver with a yellowish-green iridescence and a darker edge to the scales. This species has a maximum published total length of 5 cm (2.0 in), although 3.5 cm (1.4 in) is more common.

== Distribution and habitat ==
The greenstripe barb is found in South Asia where it occurs from eastern Pakistan, most of India south of the Punjab east to Bihar and throughout Peninsular India, as well as in Sri Lanka. It can be found in a variety of habitats including isolated ponds, rivers, submerged vegetation, primary streams, coastal and slow flowing streams, pools, lakes, mangroves, marshes and paddy fields.

== Biology ==
The greenstripe barb moves slowly over the substrate, picking at algae, zooplankton and detritus. They prefer open waters with mud substrate, sometimes being recorded from river mouths near the sea. They are oviparous and the females scatter eggs among the submerged vegetation.

== Utilisation ==
The greenstripe barb is collected for the aquarium trade and also to be used as bait.

== See also ==
- List of freshwater aquarium fish species
