= Maldives National University =

Public university in the Maldives

Coordinates: 4.171297°N 73.509068°E

- ދިވެހިރާއްޖޭގެ ޤައުމީ ޔުނިވަރސިޓީ
- Former name: Maldives College of Higher Education
- Type: Public
- Established: 1973; 53 years ago (as Allied Health Services Training Centre)
- Chancellor: Dr. Mahmood Shaugy
- Vice-Chancellor: Dr. Aishath Shehenaz Adam
- Head: Abdul Rasheed Ali
- Students: 10,000
- Location: Malé, Maldives
- Campus: 4
- Colors
- Website: mnu.edu.mv

The Maldives National University (Note: (Dhivehi: ދިވެހިރާއްޖޭގެ ޤައުމީ ޔުނިވަރސިޓީ, romanized: Dhivehiraajjeyge Qaumee Yunivarsitee; MNU)) is a public university located in Malé, Maldives. On 17 January 2011 The Maldives National University Act was passed by the President of the Maldives, the university got its name on 15 February 2011.

In 1973, the Allied Health Services Training Centre was created at MNU. In 1974, the vocational and trade center was established, providing mechanical and electrical trades. In 1984 the institution for Teacher education was created. In 1987 a tourism school was established for the sole purpose of tourism in the Maldives. In 1991 The Institute of Management and Administration was created; in order, to train staff for public and private services. In 1998 The Maldives College of Higher Education was founded. In January 1999 the Institute of Shari’ah and law was founded. In 2000 College launched first-degree Program: Bachelor of Arts.

== History ==
Maldives National University was established on 1 October 1998 by the government of Maldives. Though what is today known as MNU was there since 1973 as Allied Health Services Training Centre which later was renamed as Faculty of Health Sciences established by the Ministry of Health. The college was administered by a council called College Council, headed by late Abdul Sattar Moosa Didi.

== Faculties ==
- Faculty of Arts
- Faculty of Education
- Faculty of Engineering, Science and Technology
- Faculty of Health Sciences
- Faculty of Hospitality and Tourism Studies
- Faculty of Shari‘ah and Law
- School of Medicine
- School of Nursing
- MNU Business School
- Centre for Educational Technology and Excellence
- Centre for Foundation Studies
- Centre for Maritime Studies

== Notable alumni ==
- Ahmed Ahsan, Chief Diving Officer of MNDF Marine Corps is a notable alumni.
