= Meedhoo (Addu) =

Meedhoo (Dhivehi: މީދޫ) is the oldest populated island in Addu Atoll, having been settled between 1000 and 500 BCE. Its name comes from the original Indo-Aryan settlers, the "dhoo" comes from sanskrit "dwīpa" meaning island but the meaning of "mee" is obscure.

Meedhoo is generally considered to be the northern half of Hulhumeedhoo, and has an area of 1.827 km^{2} and a population of 2,953 (2017).

Historical population
| Year | Pop. | ±% |
|---|---|---|
| 2014 | 1,500 | — |
| 2022 | 1,892 | +26.1% |
| 2024 | 3,082 | +62.9% |
2014-2022-2024: Census populations Source:

== History ==
The 900 year old Kōgaṇṇu Cemetery in Meedhoo is the oldest cemetery in the Maldives. The largest tombstone in the country is also found in this cemetery. It is believed that this tombstone dates back to the 18th century and belongs to a royal of the Maldives.
