= Chief Justice of the Maldives =

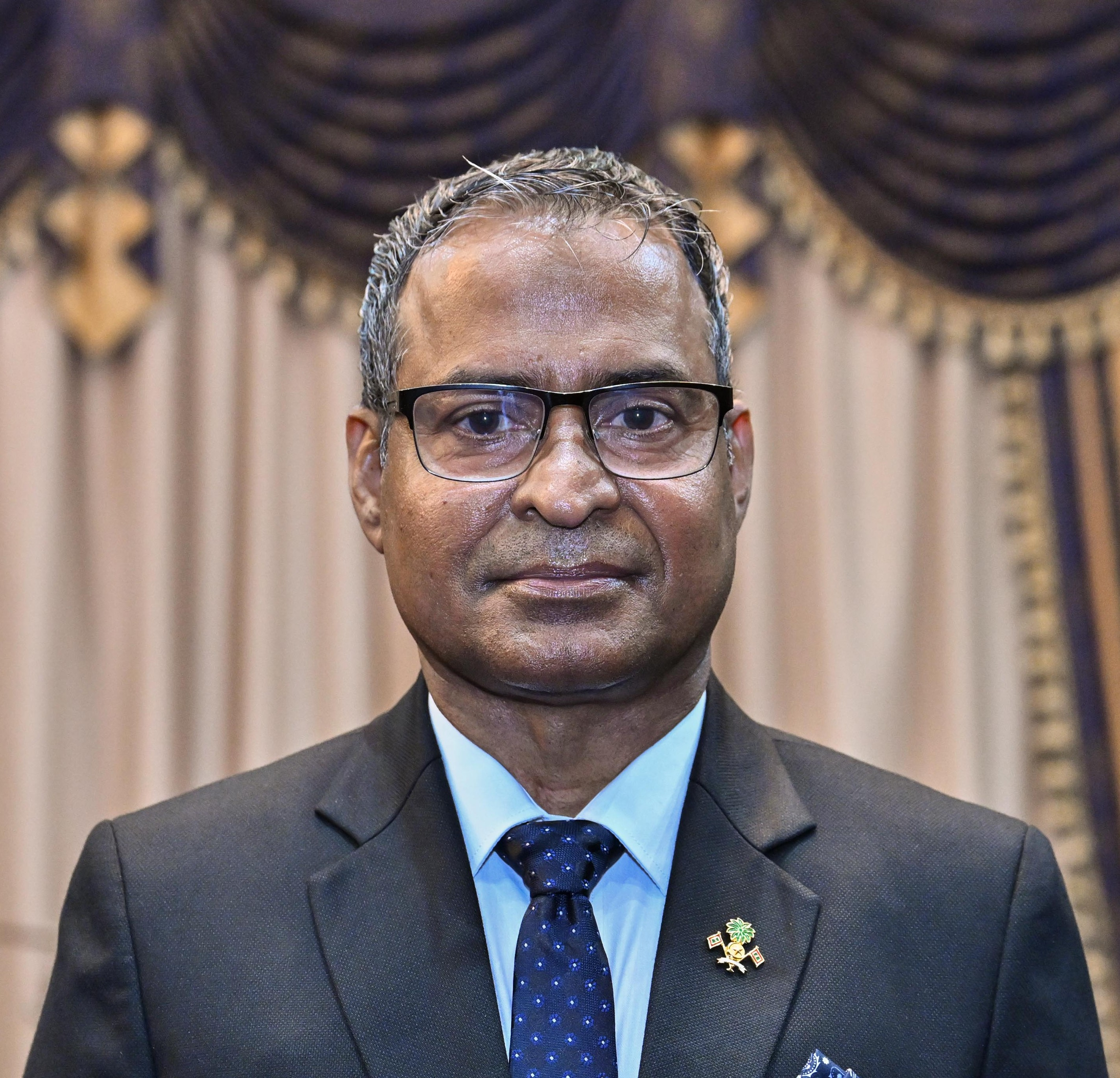
- Incumbent; Abdul Ghanee Mohamed since 6 August 2025
- Style: The Honorable (formal); Chief Justice (formal)
- Member of: Parliamentary Committee; Supreme Court
- Seat: Theemuge
- Nominator: President of the Maldives
- Appointer: People's Majlis
- Term length: Life tenure
- Constituting instrument: Constitution of the Maldives
- Formation: September 18, 2008 (not fully functional until 2010)
- First holder: Abdulla Saeed
- Salary: Up to Rf. 200,000
- Website: supremecourt.mv

The chief justice of the Maldives is the most influential member of the judicial branch of the Maldives. He is appointed by the president of the Maldives.

He is a member of parliamentary committee and one member of the five Supreme Court justices. He overlooks on cases and handles national crises, including the 2011–12 Maldives political crisis as an example, as well as the protests in Maldives between 2015 and 2016 which left more than 1000 people injured.

There have been several chief justices in the Maldives, with the Honorable Uz Abdulla Saeed being the inaugural holder under the current constitution. He was appointed as a justice of Supreme Court of the Maldives, which was brought into being by the Constitution in 2008, and assumed office as chief justice of the Maldives, pursuant to Article 285 (b) of the Constitution, on 18 September 2008.

== Appointment and removal ==
There have been several chief justices since the creation of the position in 2008.

=== Appointment ===
The president sends the name of the nominee or nominee's to the People's Majlis. It is debated if the nominee is fit and qualified to be the chief justice. The voting will take place after the debate and if approved it would be sent back to the president to appoint the new chief justice.

=== Removal ===
The removal of the chief justice is taken by People's Majlis. The president is not allowed any direct input in the decision, and cannot take any action against it. To be officially removed from office he must get a majority of the People's Majlis to vote in favor of the removal.
