= Supreme Court of the Maldives =

Highest court in the Republic of Maldives

- ދިވެހިރާއްޖޭގެ ސުޕްރީމް ކޯޓު
- Interactive map of Supreme Court of the Maldives
- 4.1786913°N 73.5088806°E
- Established: 18 September 2008
- Jurisdiction: Maldives
- Location: Theemuge, Malé, Maldives
- Coordinates: 4.1786913°N 73.5088806°E
- Composition method: Presidential Nomination and then People's Majlis Confirmation
- Authorised by: Constitution of the Maldives
- Appeals to: None, as this court is the highest court.
- Appeals from: High Court
- Judge term length: Mandatory retirement age of 70
- Number of positions: 7 justices
- Annual budget: MVR 26.7 million
- Language: Dhivehi
- Website: supremecourt.mv

Chief Justice of the Maldives
- Currently: Abdul Ghanee Mohamed
- Since: 6 August 2025

The Supreme Court of the Maldives (Dhivehi: ދިވެހިރާއްޖޭގެ ސުޕްރީމް ކޯޓު, romanized: dhivehiraajjeyge supreem koatu) is the highest court of the Maldives.

== History ==
The Supreme Court was established on 18 September 2008 under Article 282 of the Constitution of the Maldives. The first amendment to the Judicature Act made the Supreme Court bench down to 5 judges, while the third amendment reversed the first amendment and made it back to 7 judges. In 2025, the government submitted a bill in parliament to alter the bench back to 5 judges, which was met with condemnation from opposition parties. The president later sent the bill back to parliament.

== Notable rulings ==
- Four members of the country's Election Commission were set to spend six months in jail for 'disobeying orders'. Amid the state of emergency declared by President Abdulla Yameen, the Supreme Court's operations have been suspended, leaving the judiciary without anyone in charge. A court official subsequently verified that state security forces had forcibly entered the building, effectively confining the judges inside and preventing them from leaving. Additionally, during this tense situation, the Chief Justice of Maldives was arrested.

== Justices ==
The Supreme Court has 7 justices:

Name		Appointment date	Length of Tenure	Appointer
1	Abdul Ghanee Mohamed	6 August 2025	1 year, 55 days	Mohamed Muizzu
2	Aisha Shujune Muhammad	4 September 2019	7 years, 26 days	Ibrahim Mohamed Solih
3	Ali Rasheed Hussain	8 September 2020	6 years, 22 days	Ibrahim Mohamed Solih
4	Mohamed Ibrahim	8 September 2020	6 years, 22 days	Ibrahim Mohamed Solih
5	Hussain Shaheedh	19 March 2025	1 year, 195 days	Mohamed Muizzu
6	Abdulla Hameed	11 June 2025	1 year, 111 days	Mohamed Muizzu
7	Mohamed Saleem	11 June 2025	1 year, 111 days	Mohamed Muizzu

== See also ==
- Judiciary of the Maldives
