= Seenu Atoll =

Atoll of the Maldives

Native name: ސީނު އަތޮޅު
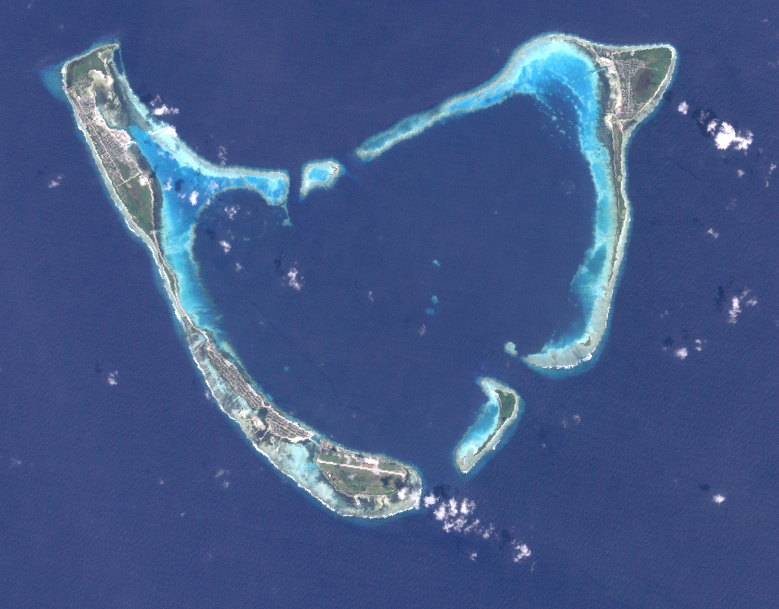
- Seenu Atoll seen from space. Note the continuous reef fringing Addu from the west and southwest.

- Location in Maldives

Geography
- Location: Indian Ocean
- Coordinates: 0.65°S 73.16°E
- Total islands: 29
- Area: 130 km^{2} (50 sq mi)(lagoon); 15 km^{2} (5.8 sq mi) (land area)

Administration
- Maldives

Demographics
- Population: 35,359 (2024)

Seenu Atoll, historically known as Addu Atoll, is the southernmost atoll of the Maldives. Addu Atoll, together with Fuvahmulah, located 40 km north of Addu Atoll, extend the Maldives into the Southern Hemisphere. Addu Atoll is located 540 km south of Malé, the country's capital. Administratively, Addu Atoll is the location of Addu City, one of the four cities of the Maldives. Addu City consists of the inhabited areas of Addu Atoll, namely the natural islands of Hulhudhoo, Meedhoo, Maradhoo, Feydhoo, and Hithadhoo. (The districts of Addu City are not according to the natural islands that it comprises). In addition to the areas that are included as a part of Addu City, Addu Atoll has a number of other inhabited and uninhabited islands, including the island of Gan, where Gan International Airport is located.

== Geography ==
Unlike other atolls of the Maldives, Addu Atoll has a lagoon that is a natural anchorage, accessible through four natural channels. This results in a natural harbour that is very calm and safe for sea vessels at all times and is not affected by seasonal changes. The four channels are arranged around the atoll as follows: the Kuda channel and the nearby Maa channel are on the north, the Gan channel is on the south, and the broad Villingili channel is on the southeast.

The islands are protected from the storms and high waves of the Indian Ocean by barrier reefs. Coconut palms, the national tree, are able to grow almost everywhere on the islands of Addu Atoll. There are small lakes, wetlands, and marshy taro fields that are unique to Addu Atoll.

== History ==
The name Addu is believed to originate from the local language, where “ah” means eight and “dhoo” means island. This is because there were traditionally eight inhabited islands in the Addu Atoll. Hithadhoo, Maradhoo, Maradhoo-Feydhoo, Feydhoo, Gan, Hulhudhoo, Hulhu-Meedhoo and Meedhoo. When the British made maps of the region, they labeled it as “Addou Atoll.” This being an Anglicized version of the local name. During the Second World War, Addu Atoll was the site of a secret Royal Navy base called HMS Haitan, to take advantage of the deep anchorage and sheltered natural harbour there. Oil tanks and storage facilities were built on Gan island, together with an airstrip and a flying boat base. The base remained unknown to the Axis throughout the early years of the war. In 1957 the base was transferred to the Royal Air Force as RAF Gan, before being closed down in 1976. The island is now the site of Gan International Airport.

== Biology ==
The cosmopolitan white tern ("dhondheeni") is found in the Maldives only on Addu Atoll and is seen as a symbol of the islands. Addu Atoll also possesses particularly rich whale and dolphin fauna. A great diversity of species has been found there. Addu Atoll is the only area in the Maldives that was not affected by the 1998 global coral bleaching. The south of the Maldives was spared from the "too warm" major ocean currents of (El Niño). The bright and healthy corals start at the top of giris and thilas (about 1 meter [3 ft] under the surface) and slope down with the reef to a depth of 30 meters (98 ft) or more.

=== Inhabited islands ===
- Hithadhoo Capitol island of Addu
- Meedhoo
- Hulhudhoo
- Maradhoo
- Feydhoo
- Gan (location of Gan International Airport)

=== Uninhabited islands ===
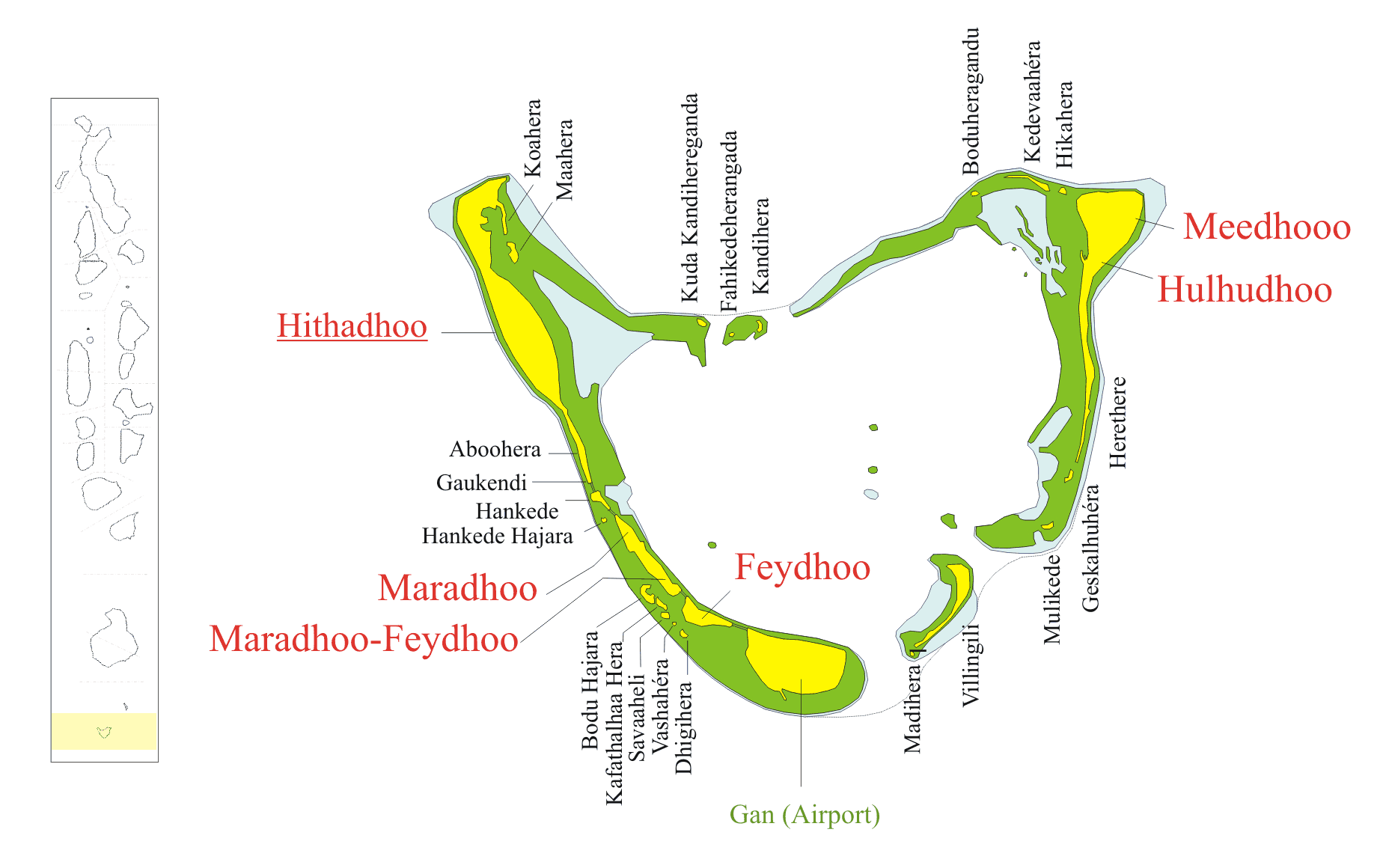

- Aboohera
- Bodu Hajara
- Boduheragandu
- Dhigihera
- Fahikedeherangada
- Gaukendi
- Geskalhuhera
- Hankede Hajara
- Here-there (Location of Canareef Island Resort)
- Hikahera
- Kafathalhaa Hera
- Kandu Huraa
- Kedevaahera
- Koahera
- Kuda Kandihereganda
- Maahera
- Maamendhoo
- Madihera
- Mulikede
- Savaaheli
- Vashahera
- Villingili (Location of Shangri-La Resort)

== Linguistics ==
The spoken dialect is Addu dialect, and though it has similarities to the "Mulaku dialect" of Fuvahmulah, it is somewhat different from the official form of the Dhivehi language. Traditionally, Addu dialect was widely spoken amongst the educated masses of three different atolls in the south, who adopted it as their lingua franca. It has also been credited with being the most famous and widespread single dialect in the Republic of Maldives. However, when Addu declared independence and recognized itself as the United Suvadive Republic, the Malé dialect rather than Addu dialect was used in official correspondence. Nevertheless, despite the difference in dialects, the written version is common throughout the Maldives.

== Culture ==
Long ago Addu City was ruled by families appointed by the sultans in Malé, and may have had a matrilineal system of inheritance; it is very much a man's world today. There was a recent period in Addu history when the status quo changed for a while, when a more matriarchal society developed and women became the breadwinners.

Addu Atoll has some of the earliest known settlements recorded in the country—specifically, on the island of Meedhoo in the far north of the atoll.

== Bibliography ==
- Frampton, Victor; Grobmeier, A. H.; Johnson, Harold & Pitt, G. L. B. (2003). "British Naval Base at Addu Atoll". Warship International. XL (2): 126–128. ISSN 0043-0374.
