= Constitution of the Maldives =

Supreme law of the Maldives

Constitution of the Republic of Maldives

Overview
- Jurisdiction: Maldives
- Ratified: 22 December 1932; 93 years ago

Government structure
- Branches: Three (Executive, Legislature and Judiciary)
- Head of state: President of the Maldives
- Chambers: People's Majlis
- Executive: President of the Maldives-led cabinet responsible to the People's Majlis

History
- Amendments: 6
- Last amended: 20 November 2024

The Constitution of the Republic of Maldives (Dhivehi: ދިވެހިރާއްޖޭގެ ޖުމްހޫރިއްޔާގެ ޤާނޫނުއަސާސީ, romanized: Dhivehiraajjeyge Jumhooriyaage Qaanoonu Asaasee) is the supreme law of the Republic of Maldives. It provides the legal foundation for the existence of the Republic of Maldives, sets out the rights and duties of the citizens of the Maldives, and defines the structure of the Government of the Maldives. The current Constitution of the Maldives was ratified by the then president, Maumoon Abdul Gayyoom, on 7 August 2008, and came into effect immediately, replacing and repealing the Constitution of 1998.

The current constitution is known by its short title, Constitution of the Republic of Maldives, 2008.

== History ==
The first written Constitution of the Maldives was codified in the early twentieth century, on 22 December 1932 during the thirtieth year of the reign of Sultan Muhammad Shamsuddeen Iskander III.

A thirteen-member committee began work on drafting the constitution on 22 March 1931. The acting Governor of Ceylon Bernard Henry Bourdillon provided technical expertise in its composition, however his recommendations were not all accepted. A first draft was completed on 16 June 1931.

With the ratification of the first Constitution of the Maldives on 22 December 1932, the first semblance of representative government came into effect. A set of credentials for the King was established – these state the King must be sane man, be of the Sunni Muslim faith and be from the ruling family. A cabinet of ministers and a parliament comprising forty seven members was also established.

The first constitution had 92 articles and a bill of rights guaranteeing equality before the law, freedom from arbitrary arrest and torture, protection of private property, freedom of expression, association and press, and a pension after 25 years of service to the state.

Though a milestone, historical records note that the Maldives' first Constitution failed within nine months of ratification.

The newly established People's Majlis passed 40 laws during its short tenure. The new legislation established fines, penalised theft and assault, created a state trading company and regulated foreign trade through a Foreign Investments Act and Freighters Act. The new laws angered the public and influential foreign traders in the Maldives. Foreign traders who had a monopoly on imported food started a series of strikes on 26 July 1933, demanding that the new government's policies be repealed.

The result of the ensuing food insecurity was a public revolt. The founders of the constitution were banished to Colombo and the constitution was amended to 84 articles in June 1934. The Maldives' first constitution was reduced to 80 articles in 1937 and finally suspended shortly after World War II broke in 1940. A special Majlis at the time stated, "The Constitution and General Provisions have been annulled as they do not fit the Maldives' situation".

On 23 April 1942, Sultan Hassan Nooradeen sent a 17 article constitution to the Majlis saying he wanted "a suitable constitution to exist in the Maldives".

The "small constitution" handed the powers of the state to the monarchy, the foreign minister, and the People's Majlis. The People's Majlis was reduced to 6 appointed members and 27 elected members. In 1950, the People's Majlis voted to abolish the monarchy and institute a republican government in the Maldives. In 1951 freedom from arbitrary arrest and banishment and freedom of expression, speech and association was reinstated. A public referendum endorsed the change and a third constitution on 1 January 1953 established a presidential system of government in the Maldives for the first time. The 34 member People's Majlis' term was set to five years.

The new democratic constitution comprising 30 articles established a president to be elected through a direct vote, a judiciary appointed by the president and a bicameral legislature – an 18-member Senate and a 47-member House of Representatives.

The new constitution also limited the presidential term to five years, but appointed Al-Ameer Mohamed Ameen Dhoshimeynaa Kilegefaanu as the first president of the Maldives. For the first time in Maldivian history, a woman was elected to the parliament.

However, the Maldives' first republic was short-lived. A revolution on 21 August 1953 abolished the Republic. The country reverted to a Sultanate on 31 January 1954. The change was followed by the ratification of the fourth Constitution of Maldives on 7 March 1954. The fourth constitution declared the Maldives to be an "elected monarchy".

A unicameral legislature was reinstated with 54 members, of which 6 were to represent the king, 46 to represent the people and two to represent businessmen. Only Maldivian men could vote to elect the People's Majlis.

Shortly after the Maldives won independence from the British Empire, the fourth constitution was repealed and a Second Republic was established under the rule of President Ibrahim Nasir in 1968. The new constitution, ratified on 11 November 1968, declared the Maldives "an independent and free state". According to the fifth constitution, the president of the Maldives was to be elected through a secret vote of the 54 member People's Majlis. This constitution was amended thrice, in 1970, 1972 and 1975 respectively.

In 1980, the second president of the second republic Maumoon Abdul Gayyoom called for a special constitutional assembly consisting of cabinet ministers and People's Majlis members to amend the new constitution.

After an 18-year long process, the fifth constitution of the Maldives was amended for the fourth time in 1998. Notable amendments included clauses permitting any individual who wished to stand for presidency to submit an application to the People's Majlis. The Majlis would then choose a candidate who then had to be approved through a public referendum.

=== 2008 Constitution ===
In September 2003, unprecedented anti-government riots broke out in Male, sparked by deaths of four prison inmates. The September riots came shortly after the Majlis had unanimously endorsed President Maumoon as the sole candidate for a record sixth term in office.

In October 2003, Maumoon was elected by 90.3 per cent of the popular vote. In his inaugural address, Gayoom promised various political reforms. Maumoon's first steps were to institute a human rights commission in 2003 to investigate abuses and to establish a constitutional assembly in May 2004 to draft a democratic constitution. The constitution was to guarantee separation of powers and a multi-party democracy.

The constitutional assembly—the People's Special Majlis— consisted of 29 appointees, along with 42 elected members of the regular Majlis and a further 42 elected members.

The drafting process was slow with rival political parties at loggerheads over several issues including the opposition proposed adoption of a parliamentary system in the Maldives. A public referendum was called in August 2007, and 60 per cent of the public backed a presidential system of government.

The sixth constitution of the Maldives, written over a period of 4 years, was completed in June 2008 and ratified by the president on 7 August 2008. The new constitution introduced a whole new set of democratic rights, enshrined the separation of powers and introduced mechanisms for accountability and transparency. It paved the way for Maldives' first multi-party elections in October 2008. This new constitution includes a judiciary run by an independent commission, and independent commissions to oversee elections and fight corruption. It also reduces the executive powers vested under the president and strengthens the parliament. Among other changes, it states that "a non-Muslim may not become a citizen of the Maldives".

The 2008 Constitution of the Maldives also requires the following for a president: be a Maldivian citizen born to parents who are Maldivian citizens, and who is not also a citizen of a foreign country; be a Muslim and a follower of a Sunni school of Islam. To be a member of the People's Majlis it requires the following: a citizen of the Maldives; is not a citizen of a foreign country; and is a Muslim and a follower of a Sunni school of Islam.

== Features ==
The constitution consists of a preamble, fourteen chapters followed by three schedules. Each chapter and schedule focus on a specific topic. The following is a list of chapters and schedules and the focus of each.

=== Chapters ===
- Chapter 1 – State, Sovereignty and Citizens
- Chapter 2 – Fundamental Rights and Freedoms
- Chapter 3 – The People's Majlis
- Chapter 4 – The President
- Chapter 5 – The Cabinet of Ministries
- Chapter 6 – The Judiciary
- Chapter 7 – Independent Commissions and Offices
- Chapter 8 – Decentralised Administration
- Chapter 9 – Security Services
- Chapter 10 – Properties, Liabilities and Legal Actions of the State
- Chapter 11 – State of Emergency
- Chapter 12 – Amendment of the Constitution
- Chapter 14 – Transitional Matters

=== Schedules ===
- Schedule 1 – Oaths of Office
- Schedule 2 – Administrative Divisions
- Schedule 3 – National Flag

== Amendments ==
As of 29 November 2024, there has been 6 amendment made to the Constitution of the Maldives, since it was enacted in 2008.

No.	Amendments	Amended date	Objectives
1st	Amended article 109.	25 June 2015	To change the age criterion for a person to be qualified for election as president, to a minimum 30 years old, and a maximum 65 years old.
2nd	Amended article 262(b)	23 July 2015	To allow foreign ownership and freeholds in the country.
3rd	Amended article 109(c)	3 December 2018	To change the age criterion for a person to run for election as president to be at least 35 years old.
4th	Amended article 251(a, b)	23 April 2019	To annul the 2nd amendment.
5th	Amendment article 231(a, b)	8 December 2019	To make Island Councillors, City Councillors elected by that community through an undisclosed vote, along with the President of the Atoll Council, and other members. Presidents and Mayors of the Islands, Atolls and Cities will be elected through an undisclosed democratic vote.
6th	Added subsection to article 73, article 262(b), amended article 3(a, b), article 115(e), article 251(c)	20 November 2024	Subsection to Article 73: Added subsection e to Article 73 that removes a member of parliament if they defect from the political party they ticketed in, join a party after they were elected as an independent candidate, or voluntarily leave or expelled from that party.; Subsection to Article 262(b): Requiring public referendum to confirm popular support for laws that changes the country's territory or for constitutional amendments passed by the parliament.; Amendment to Article 3(a), 3(b): Any modification of the territory of the Maldives must be enacted through a law passed by three-fourths of all members of the parliament.; Amendment to Article 115(e): Expand the president's powers, granting authority to determine key national policies, provide advice and guidance to state agencies, and formulate national development plans and strategic visions.; Amendment to Article 251(c); Regulates the use of Maldivian territory for military use by non-nationals. use being only allowed through agreements or arrangements approved by a parliament majority, except for military exercises.

== Previous Constitutions ==
No.	Constitution	Date ratified	Date abolished	Head of Government	Amendments	Notes
1	Constitution of the Maldives, 1932	22 December 1932	5 July 1934	Sultan Muhammad Shamsuddeen III	N/A	First constitution.
2	Constitution of the Maldives, 1934	5 July 1934	28 January 1937	Sultan Muhammad Shamsuddeen III	16 July 1936	To meet growing public demands.
3	Constitution of the Maldives, 1937	28 January 1937	30 January 1940	Sultan Hassan Nooraddeen II	–	Amending entire 2nd constitution.
4	Constitution of the Maldives, 1942	23 April 1942	31 May 1951	Sultan Hassan Nooraddeen II	Yes	Reinitiated constitutional system.
5	Constitution of the Maldives, 1942	31 May 1951	1953	Sultan Hassan Nooraddeen II	–	
6	Constitution of the Republic of Maldives, 1954	1953	31 January 1954	President Mohamed Amin Didi	–	
7	Constitution of the Maldives, 1954	7 March 1954	14 June 1964	Sultan Muhammad Fareed Didi	–	
8	Constitution of the Maldives, 1964	14 June 1964	10 June 1967	Sultan Muhammad Fareed Didi	–	Major amendment.
9	Constitution of the Maldives, 1967	10 June 1967	11 November 1968	Sultan Muhammad Fareed Didi	–	Major amendment.
10	Constitution of the Republic of Maldives, 1968	11 November 1968	27 January 1977	President Ibrahim Nasir	23 April 1970; 2 February 1972; 15 April 1975	
11	Constitution of the Republic of Maldives, 1997	27 January 1977	7 August 2008	President Maumoon Abdul Gayoom	1	

== See also ==
- Constitutional law
- Constitutional economics
- Constitutionalism
