= 2024 in the Maldives =

- Decades: 2000s; 2010s; 2020s
- See also: Other events of 2024; Timeline of Maldivian history

The following lists events that happened during 2024 in the Maldives.

== Incumbents ==
- President: Mohamed Muizzu
- Vice President: Hussain Mohamed Latheef
- Majlis speaker:
  - Mohamed Aslam (until 28 May)
  - Abdul Raheem Abdulla (from 28 May)
- Chief Justice: Ahmed Muthasim Adnan
- Majlis

== Events ==
=== January ===
- 3 January:
  - Private companies are allowed to operate drug rehabilitation centres in the country.
- 4 January:
  - President Mohamed Muizzu launches a multimillion-dollar project to upgrade Velana International Airport (VIA) to boost the capacity to 25 million passengers, resulting in the relocation of seaplane terminals to Funadhoo for the project to continue. The Maldives International Financial Services Authority was established on 21 January 2024, under the ministry of Economic Development and Trade.
- 7 January:
  - Malé Prison is relocated due to its close proximity to other schools and colleges.
  - The National Anthem begins playing every day at schools.

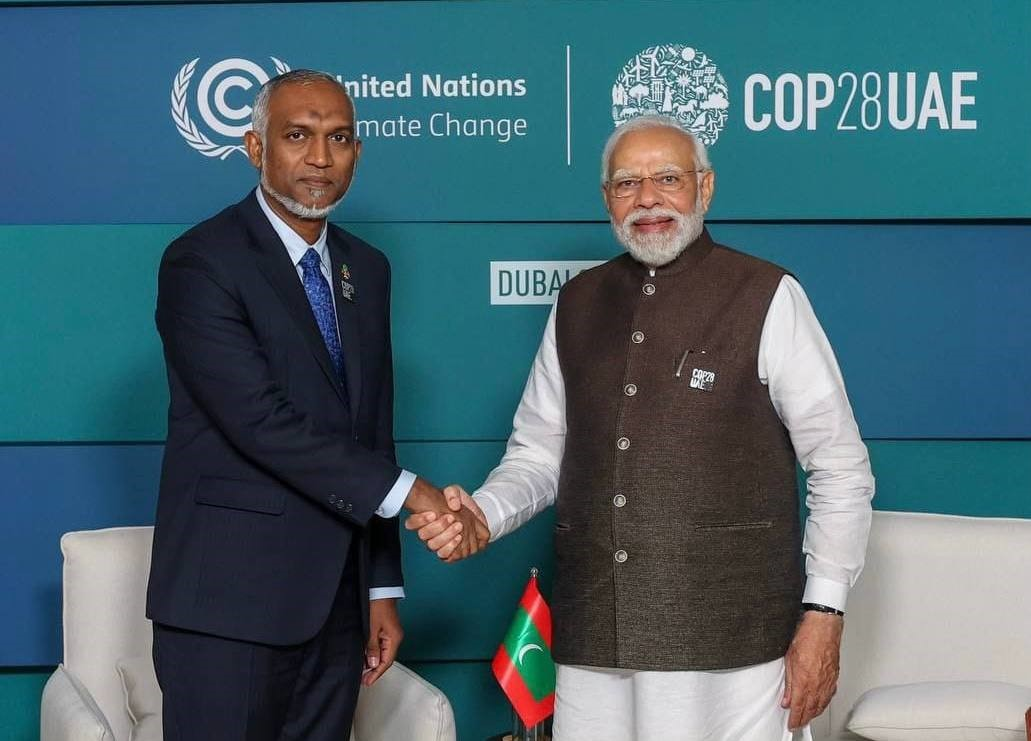
Muizzu meeting Indian Prime Minister Narendra Modi at the 2023 United Nations Climate Change Conference in 2023. India and Maldives faced a 2024 India–Maldives diplomatic row in January 2024.

- 8 January:
  - 2024 India-Maldives diplomatic row: Three deputy ministers who worked at the Ministry of Youth Empowerment, Information and Arts were suspended for insulting Indian Prime Minister Narendra Modi on X when he posted a photo of him in Lakshadweep. The Youth Ministry officials made derogatory remarks about the Indian Prime Minister. As the Maldives is a Muslim nation, and strongly supports Palestine on Israel's Invasion in Gaza, it prompted diplomatic tensions about India-Maldives relations and boycott movement in India targeting Maldives tourism.
- 10 January:
  - Indian hackers attack the website of the Juvenile Court of the Maldives.
- 12 January:
  - Malé and other islands experience flooding. Hulhumalé Cemetery is flooded and bodies that were to be buried are moved to Galolhu Cemetery in Malé. The weather causes flight delays and damages one plane, as well as submerging 144 houses and displacing several hundred residents. It recorded 159mm of rainfall, the highest in recorded history.
  - The court trial of actor Mohamed Yunan and his wife Fathimath Rihula ends. They are charged with multiple counts of sexually abusing children in their family from 2019 to 2020.
- 13 January:
  - Voters in Malé vote for a new mayor. Adam Azim wins the election.
- 14 January:
  - The Maldives calls for the complete withdrawal of the Indian Armed Forces from its territory by March 15 amid a diplomatic dispute between the two countries. India currently has around 80 troops stationed on the archipelago. President Muizzu gives India until March 15 to remove all troops.
  - Education Ministry and Maldives Government announces "Nationalism" be taught in schools starting from the next academic year as a new subject.
- 15 January:
  - The government sends a private flight to Turkey to bring back Maldivian ex-fighters that were displaced during the Syrian civil war.
  - Dharumavantha Hospital succeeds Indira Gandhi Memorial Hospital as the primary government hospital.
  - The government allows temporary fostering of children under state custody.
- 16 January:
  - Air in Malé becomes unusually polluted due to the change in season from Hulhangu (Southwest monsoon) to Iruvai (Northeast monsoon), with the air quality index being 168.
  - Urbanco begins calling itself Housing Development Corporation (HDC) due to public confusion relating to its name.
- 17 January:
  - Maldives controls the spread of Hepatitis B and is given recognition by the World Health Organization.
- 18 January:
  - The Elections Commission of Maldives (ECM) mandates that individuals wishing to participate in parliamentary elections must open separate bank accounts.
  - The government constructs temporary mosques in Phase II of Hulhumalé for Ramadan.
- 20 January:
  - Hong Kong Airlines resumes direct flights to Maldives.
- 21 January:
  - The government establishes the Maldives International Financial Services Authority, which will function under the Ministry of Economic Development and Trade.
- 23 January:
  - Adam Azim is sworn in as the new Mayor of Malé.
- 25 January:
  - The first session of Ahaa, a public forum of ministers, is held at Sultan Park.
  - Maldivian expands operations to Hoarafushi Airport.
- 26 January:
  - Malé City Council and the Ministry of Agriculture and Animal Welfare sign an agreement to develop a temporary cat shelter.
- 27 January:
  - New police stations are established in Baa Atoll Maalhos, and Kihaadhoo, and Noonu Atoll Henbadhoo and, Lhohi.
- 28 January:
  - The People's Majlis sees clashes erupt between minority ruling party MPs and majority opposition MPs over a crucial vote on President Muizzu's Cabinet. The main opposition party MDP along with The Democrats decide to withhold parliamentary approval for four members of Muizzu's cabinet ahead of the voting on the cabinet. MPs from the People's National Congress obstruct the sitting, as a protest began outside in defense of the ministers. Several lawmakers were injured and one ruling party member was hospitalised. Ruling party members submit a No-confidence trial against Speaker Mohamed Aslam and Deputy Speaker Ahmed Saleem.
- 29 January:
  - Opposition party members including Maldivian Democratic Party and The Democrats submit an Impeachment motion against President Muizzu.
  - The People's Majlis approves 19 Cabinet ministers and rejects three others, namely Attorney General Ahmed Usham, Minister of Islamic Affairs Mohamed Shaheem and Ministry of Housing, Land and Urban Development Ali Haidar Ahmed.
  - Government reintroduces helicopter flight services.
  - Maldives Food and Drug Authority (MFDA) bans Toblerone after it was found by the European Rapid Alert System for Food and Feed that a batch was contaminated with plastic.
- 30 January:
  - Ministers who were rejected by parliament are re-appointed by President Muizzu.
  - ECM opens applications for parliamentary elections.
  - MFDA orders a Panadol recall after discovering quality issues and defects with the medicine.
  - Dhiraagu signs a partnership agreement with the Environmental Protection Agency (EPA) to restore the damage caused to Rasfari reef.
- 31 January:
  - Protests occur over Club Valencia board transfer where it is alleged that Mohamed Tholal, the sports commissioner, changed the board members without the club knowing, causing Bassam Adeel Jaleel, ex-president of FAM to lose control over the club.
  - Desalination plants are established in five islands with Chinese aid.
  - Prosecutor General Hussain Shameem is attacked on the street with a hammer, resulting in him being admitted to ADK Hospital. The MNDF has since strengthened his security detail. The attackers are found to have stalked him for hours beforehand and concealed their identity using helmets. The police summon former president Ibrahim Mohamed Solih after his statement which suggested he has credible information.
  - Foreign military boards vessels in Maldives Ocean Territory, which is believed to be Indian Coast Guard or Navy by the Yellowfin Tuna Fisherman's Union (Bodu Kanneli Masveringe Union).

=== February ===
- 1 February:
  - The Prosecutor General's Office (PGO) files charges against Ex-President of FAM, Bassam Abdul Jaleel.
  - Maldives faces a lack of several common medicines.
  - Bar Council President Ismail Visham dies.
  - MP Eva Abdulla submits a motion to review the reappointment of ministers that were dismissed in parliament.
  - India assigns US$93 million to be used as free aid to the Maldives.
- 2 February:
  - A state owned enterprise, Public Service Media (PSM), hosts parliamentary debates featuring candidates running for all 93 constituencies, which was planned to be hosted in the auditorium of the Maldives National University.
  - The two people connected to the attack on PG Hussain Shameem are arrested.
  - A case of whooping cough is detected in GA and Villingili.
  - India hosts a second round of deliberations to remove foreign military presence and agrees to remove all military by May 10.
  - The Ministry of Defence identifies foreign military that boarded local vessels as Indian Coastguard Ships 246 and 253. Maldives also requests India to write a response to explain the jurisdiction behind Indian Coastguards boarding and operating in Maldives EEZ.
  - A car crashes into solar panels in Sinamalé Bridge, resulting in both the car and the solar panels being damaged.
  - A case is filed in the Civil Court regarding the results of the Henveiru Central constituency in ruling PPM/PNC primaries.
- 3 February:
  - The Maldives and India agree to replace military personnel with civil personnel.
- 4 February:
  - President Muizzu announces that Eid al-Fitr (20 Ramadan to 3 Shawwal) is an Annual Holiday starting that year.
- 5 February:
  - Opposition parties, including MDP and The Democrats, boycott this year's presidential address due to Muizzu's failure on security in parliamentarians during the 28 January brawl.
- 7 February:
  - The government submits the re-appointed ministers to parliament.
- 8 February:
  - Dhivehi and Islam are announced to continue being taught abroad to Maldivians in the next week.
- 9 February:
  - New policy to carry out medical checkups for immigrant workers.
- 10 February:
  - The Animal Welfare Ministry hands over plot required to make a cat facility to Male' City Council.
  - 500 athletes from 31 schools across the Maldives attend the Inter-School Athletics Meet in Addu City hosted by the Athletics Association of Maldives.
- 11 February:
  - Ahmed Shaheer appointed as Chairman of Fenaka
  - First female Atoll Council President elected, the new president is Hawwa Abdul Azees of Faafu Atoll Council.
- 12 February:
  - Maldives Airports Company Limited (MACL) chairman Mohamed Umar Manik (MU Manik) resigns.
  - Deputy Speaker Ahmed Saleem proposes an amendment to summon President Muizzu and Vice President Hussain Mohamed Latheef to parliament for questioning.
  - Applications for the taxi driver register open.
- 13 February:
  - The Government announces plans to submit 24 bills to parliament.
  - Civil Court orders ECM to pay Rf. 50,000 as compensation to Maldives Reform Movement (MRM) for dissolving the party.
  - Applications open for MDP President.
- 14 February:
  - Installation of additional elevators in Hulhumale' Hiya Flats is contracted to a Chinese company.
  - Younger children being enrolled to higher preschool grades is announced to be repeated.
  - The no confidence motion against Speaker Aslam and Deputy Speaker Saleem is withdrawn.
  - An Embassy of Maldives is established in Ankara Turkey.
  - XiamenAir's first flight lands in the Maldives.
- 15 February:
  - Health Ministry plans to build a cancer hospital behind Dharumavantha Hospital.
  - Maldives High Court stops Gulhifalhu reclamation due to a court case being filed that it was being conducted in an unfriendly way to the environment. The state appeals to the Supreme Court.
  - The Health Protection Agency (HPA) conducts food inspection to food outlets in Malé, Hulhumalé and Villingili.
  - ECM announces timeframe for candidate withdrawal in the upcoming parliamentary elections.
- 20 February:
  - Abdulla Shahid wins the MDP presidency as sole candidate.
  - Department of National Registry (DNR) changes policy to allow issuance of ID cards to other individuals if they come with a letter by the owner permitting access.
- 21 February:
  - The Maldives’ donation of two million tuna cans to the Gaza Strip is delayed.
  - National Mental Helpline is established, its helpline number being 1677.
  - The Indian High Commission in Maldives confirms that onion exports will proceed under a separate bilateral agreement.
  - The new apron of the Hanimaadhoo International Airport is officially opened for operations.
- 22 February:
  - Bank of Maldives (BML) opens a self-service ATM in Gulhi and Keyodhoo.
  - The MFDA reissues a permit for Panadol use and distribution.
  - The Maldives delivers a statement to ICJ on behalf of the Palestinian people upon request by the Government of Palestine.
  - The ACC opens investigation into allegations of corruption involving former parliamentarians and government ministers.
  - The Housing Ministry launches 'Hiyaavehi' housing portal which is accessible in eFaas.
  - The MDP submits anti-defection bill to parliament to prevent floor crossing.
- 23 February:
  - The Home Ministry's website is attacked by an Indian hacker group with the name "Cyber Force" in response to the Maldives’ anti-India remarks.
- 24 February:
  - India, Sri Lanka, and the Maldives begin joint coast guard training exercises.
- 25 February:
  - Arabiyya School construction begins.
  - The Maldives Trade Association is established.
- 29 February: The Maldivian Parliamentary election is moved to 21 April.

=== March ===
- 1 March:
  - Air ambulance service between Maldives and Sri Lanka begins.

=== April ===
- 8 April:
  - 2024 India-Maldives diplomatic row: Mariyam Shiuna, a suspended Youth Ministry official, mocks Asoka Chakra on Edited MDP's campaign poster for 2024 Maldivian parliamentary election, and later deletes the post and apologizes on X (formally Twitter).

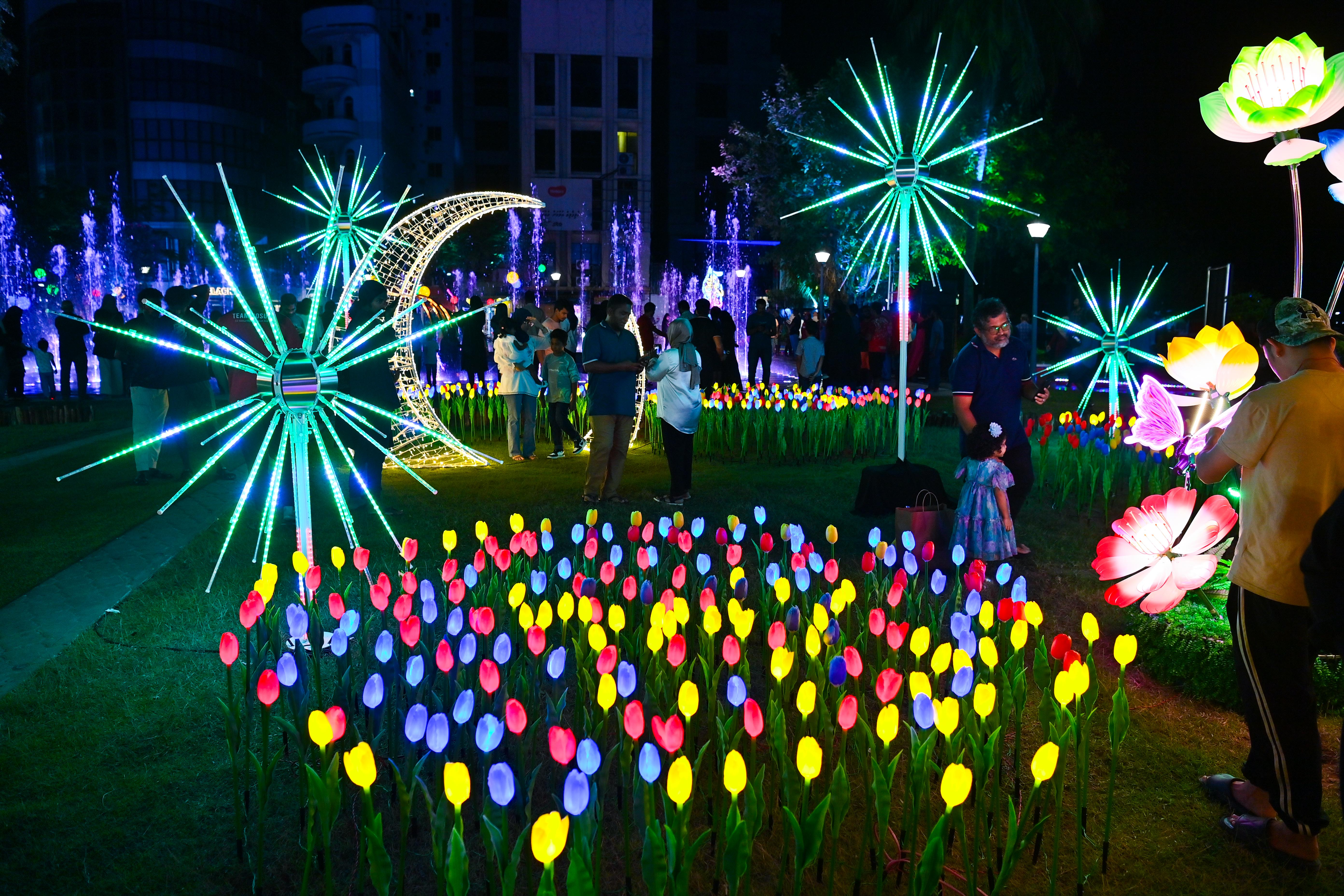
Maldives turns on the Festive lights across the parks and the Road to Celebrate Eid al-Fitr.

  - President Muizzu inaugurates 'Eid Ali', an initiative aimed at illuminating islands across the Maldives in the celebration of Eid al-Fitr.
- 9 April:
  - Former president Abdulla Yameen's Party PNF holds their inauguration.
- 10 April:
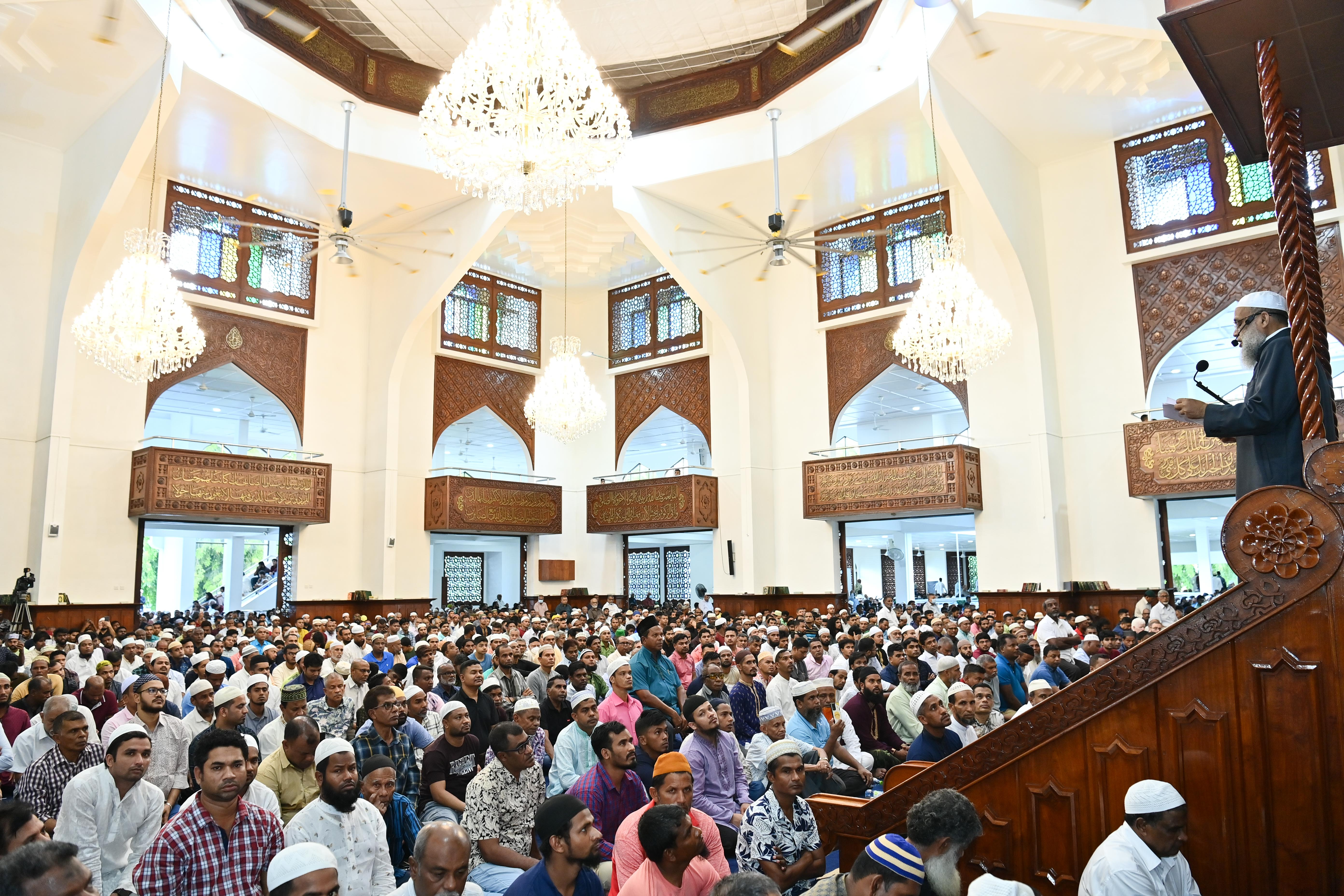
  Muslims in Maldives gathers at the Islamic Centre for Eid al-Fitr Prayer on the Morning of 10 April 2024
  - Sermon calls for strengthening social ties on Eid.
- 18 April:
  - The High Court of the Maldives overturns former president Abdulla Yameen's 11-year prison sentence for corruption and orders a retrial.
- 21 April:
  - 2024 Maldivian parliamentary election: Maldivians elect a new parliament.
  - President Muizzu's party, the People's National Congress (PNC), is declared the winner of the election.
- 23 April:
  - The President appoints Heena Waleed as Chief Spokesperson at the President's Office.
- 24 April:
  - Six candidates who won the 2024 Maldivian parliamentary election join the PNC, changing their total number of seats from 66 to 72.
  - Former UNGA President, foreign minister, and current president of MDP Abdulla Shahid's father, Sheikh Moosa Jameel, dies. The funeral prayer is held at Islamic Center after Asr prayer, and he is laid to rest at the Galolhu Cemetery.
- 25 April:
  - MP-elect Mohamed Rasheed, an independent from the Nolhivaram constituency, joins the PNC.
  - GCE Ordinary Level Exams begin in Maldives.
- 28 April:
  - MDH and Everest global safety concerns: Maldives Food and Drug Authority (MFDA) bans MDH and Everest Spices after it was warned by the Singapore Food Agency and Hong Kong's Center for Food Safety that these brand's curry powders were found to contain ethylene oxide. Maldives is the third country to ban two Indian Spice brands despite the India-Maldives conflict.
- 29 April:
  - Abdulla Siyaz is appointed as State Minister for Ministry of Economic Development and Trade.
  - HPA reports 72 cases of Chikungunya during April.
- 30 April:
  - Foakaidhoo experiences flooding after 2 hours of heavy rainfall.

=== May ===
- 1 May:
  - A Labour Day protest is held.
  - The government condemns threats made against RaajjeTV and Channel 13.
- 2 May:
  - Maldives calls to abolish the power to veto motions at the United Nations Security Council (UNSC), stating that the country cannot turn a blind eye towards Israel's genocide of Palestinians.
  - Homeland Security Minister, Ali Ihusaan, announces a photograph and fingerprint collection of expatriate workers.
  - PSM news's special coverage is held on occasion of their anniversary.
- 3 May:
  - President Muizzu assures local media that he will provide a special allowance or incentive to address the concern of media outlets receiving low income.
  - MDP accuses the government of trying to mislead the public about their obstructing freedom of press.
  - Kaashidhoo constituency MP Abdulla Jabir resigns from the People's Majlis.
- 4 May:
  - Discussions are held between the Maldivian government and the Saudi Arabian government to formally open King Salman Mosque.
- 5 May:
  - The Maldives calls for justice for the Palestinian people at the Islamic Summit of the Organisation of Islamic Cooperation.
  - The US Montana National Guard and the Maldives National Defence Force commence a joint military exercise.
  - The Democrats secure victory in the Maduvvari Council President By-Elections.
- 6 May:
  - Parliament approves appointment of Ambassadors to Bangladesh, China & Saudi Arabia.
  - The Maldives wins four titles at the World Travel Awards in the Indian Ocean category.
- 7 May:
  - A seven story building is planned on being added to Addu Equatorial Hospital.
- 8 May:
  - Taxis’ overcharging and unavailability at VIA is fixed.
- 9 May:
  - The government launches large-scale project to fix Male' City's flooding.
  - The President officiates oath-taking and firearm presentation ceremony for the graduates of Maldives National Defense Force's 70th basic training course.
- 10 May:
  - Cross-match samples become extractable from within Maldives.
  - All Indian military personnel leave the Maldives.
- 27 May:
  - The northern atoll of Haa Dhaalu Atoll experiences tremors.
- 28 May:
  - Members of the 20th Parliament of the Maldives take oath of office.
  - Abdul Raheem Abdulla is elected as Parliament Speaker, along with Ahmed Nazim being appointed as Deputy Speaker.
  - President Mohamed Muizzu congratulates Parliament members of the 20th People's Majlis.
- 30 May:
  - The first immigration raid led by all female officers occurs.
  - Izzudheen and Salahuddin School starts O level education.
- 31 May:
  - MDP South Galolhu constituency Meekail Ahmed Naseem submits bill to parliament calling for a ban on entry of Israeli passport holders.

=== June ===
- 1 June:
  - The Ministry of Education announces that textbooks have been provided to every school in Maldives.
  - Male' to hold by-election for three vacant seats at the city council.
- 2 June:
  - The Cabinet decides to change laws to prevent Israeli passport holders from entering the country and to establish a subcommittee to oversee the process.
  - The Israeli Foreign Ministry issues a travel warning asking Israeli citizens to leave the Maldives.
- 6 June:
  - Maldives announces that Eid al-Adha is the 16th of June.
- 17 June:
  - Attorney General Ahmed Usham announced that the Maldives would review its ban on Israeli passport holders due to the fact that it would ban Israeli-Arabs who identify as Palestinian.
- 25 June:
  - Maldivian Midfielder Mohamed Arif Passes Away while receiving treatment. President Muizzu conveyed heartfelt condolences to his family in a message posted on the social media platform X. He was laid to rest at the Galolhu Cemetery after Funeral Prayer at the Islamic Center early morning of 26 June. due to his death, HPA revealed that following the detection of a case of Meningococcal disease, relevant information has been collected, contact tracing has been done, contacts have been informed and contacts have been provided prophylactic drugs for disease prevention. HPA stressed the importance of visiting a doctor without delay, if those who travelled to Saudi Arabia to perform this year's pilgrimage during extreme heat who did not receive the meningitis vaccine for any reason or those who did not complete 14 days between the date of vaccination and their departure for the Hajj pilgrimage, develop symptoms.
- 27 June:
  - Two state environment ministers were suspended and arrested for allegedly performing black magic on President Muizzu.
  - Maldives cancels Independence Day activities over an economic crisis in the country. Maldives has planned to raise GST and TGST in 2025 which sparked anger and criticism by Opposition supporters that President Muizzu has failed economically.
  - Maldives welcomes 1 millionth tourist of the year 2024.

=== July ===
- 9 July:
  - MNDF states that there were no signs of an explosion despite having responded to reports of an explosion inside a van parked at 'Galolhu Kanmathi' in Malé.
  - The 'Welcome' monument, built at Velana International Airport, is unveiled.
- 13 July:
  - Izzudheen School is closed due to the building’s structure being in poor condition. The students are transferred to Dharumavantha School.
  - Maldives Consulate in Kerala advises caution to Maldivians as a “brain-eating” amoeba infection spreads in Kerala.
  - The Maldives pledges to donate over US$1.29 million (MVR 19.8 million) as a humanitarian aid for Palestine through UNRWA.
- 15 July:
  - The Bank of Maldives reject ex-president Yameen's lawsuit, claiming it cannot be used over the agreement between Yameen and the Anti-Corruption Commission.
  - A Maldivan working at the Hidhmaiy charity organization is met with an accident during an eight-hour car ride to Chittagong from Dhaka, Bangladesh when the driver falls asleep at the wheel.
- 16 July:
  - A KFC outlet in Malé City is vandalized, with the vandals having broken the glass shopfront and damaging property. They were vandalized after putting up posters calling for the boycott of these business in relation to the ongoing genocide in Palestine.
  - The Maldives announces the shortage of fish supplies in stores.
- 18 July:
  - Mother of ex-president Ibrahim Mohamed Solih and Majeediyya School principal's mother dies at 80 years of age while seeking treatment at the ADK Hospital. The current president Mohamed Muizzu extends condolences to former president Ibrahim Mohamed Solih and his family on the social media platform X.
- 20 July:
  - A KFC outlet in Malé City is vandalized for the second time in a row., A 48-year-old man is arrested for allegedly shattering the glass shopfront of the KFC outlet on Ameenee Magu on Tuesday night, a police media official says. The man is arrested under a court order and is remanded in custody for 30 days.
  - The ruling party People's National Congress (PNC) secures five out of the six local council seats in the by-elections held on Saturday. PNC wins all seats except for Rasmaadhoo.
- 23 July:
  - The High Court commences the appeal hearings two years after appeal cases were submitted against the two suspects who were convicted of the murder and sentenced to life in prison, and the two suspects who were acquitted in the murder of blogger Yameen Rasheed.
  - The Islamic call to prayer Adhan calls in Parliament chambers during prayer time.
  - MTCC says that the reconstruction of the Izzuddeen Jetty is facing delays due to difficulties in bringing in necessary material from abroad.
  - Minister of Education Dr. Ismail Shafeeu announces that A-level classes will be introduced in 23 additional schools. In addition to this, students who receive even a single pass in their O'level examinations are now be eligible to join A-level studies.
- 25 July:
  - Maldivian Democratic Party approved the appointment of former Thulhaadhoo MP Hisaan Hussain as the party's vice president.
  - President Dr. Mohamed Muizzu inaugurates a special program titled 'Malé Fehi' which aims to address the issue of congestion and traffic woes in the Malé City. The program includes charging a toll fee on the Sinamalé Bridge connecting Male', Hulhumale' and Hulhule. Due to criticism, President Muizzu posts on X saying that it is not his policy to charge tolls from the bridge.
  - Yoosuf Maaniu Mohamed resigns as State Minister of Homeland Security and Technology.
- 26 July:
  - Transparency Maldives expresses worry over the ministry's decision to deport migrants involved in Quota Reform Movement Protest in G.dh Thinadhoo.
- 27 July:
  - Olympics: Fathimath Dheema Ali, the first Maldivian athlete to qualify for the Olympics through the South Asian Qualifiers, faces defeat in that day’s preliminary round match against Katarzyna Wegrzyn from Poland.
- 28 July:
  - Maldives resumes medical evacuations with India-gifted Donier aircraft after 7 months due to Maldives-India Conflict.
  - Olympics: India's PV Sindhu, who secured medals in the last two Olympics, wins her match against Maldives' badminton star Fathimath Nabaha Abdul Razzaq.

=== August ===
- 1 August:
  - Amidst significant public pressure, the government of the Maldives issues a formal message of condolence to Ismail Haniyeh, the leader of Hamas, following recent events.
- 2 August:
  - Amid public anger from pro-Palestine supporters, the Ministry of Islamic Affairs announces that absentee funeral prayer for Ismail Haniyeh, the leader of Hamas, would be held in mosques across the country after the Jumu'ah (Friday) prayer. While some mosques comply with this directive, others do not. According to state media outlet PSM news, absentee funeral prayers for Ismail Haniyeh were conducted in mosques across the country. The prayers were held following a directive from the Ministry of Islamic Affairs amidst public pressure from pro-Palestine supporters.
  - Adam Azim wins the Maldivian Democratic Party's national council by-elections, winning the presidency of Malé constituency.
- 5 August:
  - USAID provides a financial assistance of 8.5 million $ to the Maldives.
  - The government raises concerns regarding the lack of rental payments for housing units, despite implementing a 20% rent reduction.
- 6 August:
  - The High Commission of the Maldives in the United Kingdom requests that all Maldivian nationals residing in the UK register with the High Commission. This request comes in response to ongoing anti-Muslim riots by the English Defence League.
- 22 August: The Maldives report their first two cases of mpox, but do not specify the clade the cases are from.

=== September ===
- 30 September:
  - President Muizzu reshuffles his cabinet, due to the resignation of Mohamed Shafeeq, making Abdulla Khaleel from Health Minister to Foreign Affairs Minister, Moosa Zameer from Foreign Affairs Minister to Finance Minister, and Abdulla Nazim Ibrahim from Principal Secretary to the President on Public Policy to Health Minister.

=== October ===
- 3 October:
  - Uncle of former president Ibrahim Nasir dies at the age of 96.

=== November ===
- 3 November:
  - Maldives celebrates Victory Day.

=== December ===
- 1 December:
  - Aishath Rameela resigns as Minister of Agriculture and Animal Welfare, and the president assigns Maryam Mariya to temporarily oversee the Ministry.
- 12 December:
  - Maldives government buildings fire: The building housing the Ministry of Housing, Land and Urban Development, as well as the Ministry of Construction and Infrastructure catches fire along with the first two floors of Green Building which houses the Ministry of Climate Change, Environment and Energy.
- 14 December:
  - Maldives government buildings fire: Affected ministries are relocated to Dharubaaruge.
- 15 December:
  - The vape ban fully comes into force under the First Amendment to the Tobacco Control Act.
- 25 December:
  - President Mohamed Muizzu sends condolences to the President of Azerbaijan following the Azerbaijan Airlines flight crash near Aktau.
- 26 December:
  - The Maldives reaches 2 million tourist arrivals.
  - The Maldives marks 20th year of Indian Ocean Tsunami, and observes a moment of silence across the country.
- 27 December:
  - President Mohamed Muizzu sends message of condolence following the passing of India's former Prime Minister Manmohan Singh.
- 28 December: Japanese lawmaker Toshiyuki Adachi dies while snorkeling in the sea near a resort in Lhaviyani Atoll.
- 30 December:
  - President Mohamed Muizzu sends condolences following the passing of America’s former President Jimmy Carter.
  - President Mohamed Muizzu sends condolences to the Acting President of South Korea following the Jeju Air flight crash at Muan International Airport.
  - Washington Post reveals that Maldives opposition Maldivian Democratic Party gave India's Research and Analysis Wing (R&AW) 87 million Rufiyaa (USD $5 Million).

== Holidays ==
- 1 January – New Year's Day
- 11 March – Ramadan
- 31 March to 12 April – Eid al-Fitr Holiday
- 21 April – Election Day
- 22 April – Post-Election Holiday
- 1 May – Labour Day
- 16 June to 20 June — Eid al-Adha
- 7 July – Islamic New Year
- 26 July – Independence Day
- 14 August – Post-Flood Holiday
- 4 September – National Day (Qaumee Dhuvas)
- 5 September – National Day Holiday
- 16 September – Prophet Muhammad's Birthday
- 5 October – The Day Maldives Embraced Islam
- 3 November – Victory Day
- 10 November – Republic Day Holiday
- 11 November – Republic Day

== Academic Days ==
- 7 January – Beginning of second term in Maldives
- 20 January – Professional Development Day 02
- 21 January to 8 February – Exam for Grade 11 & 12
- 24 January – International Day of Education
- 24 February – Professional Development Day 03
- 24 February to 14 March – Grade 10 Mock Exam
- 17 to 21 March – SSE and SIP
- 31 March to 12 April – Eid al-Fitr Holiday (i.e.: Mid-term Break)
- April to June – GCE Ordinary Level Examination
- 16 to 27 April – Final exam
- 30 April – Annual holiday starts
- 1 to 25 May – Annual Holiday
- 22 May – Teacher's Reporting Day
- 26 May – First day of school in Maldives (2024 to 2025)
- 16 June to 20 June — Eid al-Adha
- 29 June – Professional Development Day 01
- 11 to 28 August – Final exam for Grade 11 & 12
- 10 to 22 September – Exam for Grade 8, 9 & 10
- 26 September – School break
- 27 September to 5 October – School Break Holiday
- October to November – GCE A-level Examination
- 5 October – Teacher's day
- 6 October – Beginning of Second term in Maldives
- 26 October – Professional Development Day 02
- 22 December 2024 to 2 January 2025 – New Year Holiday (i.e.: Mid-term Break)

== Arts and entertainment ==
- List of Maldivian films of 2024

== Sport ==
Other sports

- Maldives at the 2024 Summer Olympics
- Maldives at the 2024 Summer Paralympics

== Deaths ==
- 25 June: Mohamed Arif, 38, footballer (VB Sports Club, Club Eagles, national team)
- 18 July: Moomina Hussainfulhu, 80, Mother of former President Ibrahim Mohamed Solih and Mother of the Majeediyya School principal Aishath Mohamed Solih
- 3 October: Uncle of former president, 86, Ibrahim Nasir
