= MDH and Everest global safety concerns =

2024 food safety controversy

In April 2024, Singapore and Hong Kong halted sales of some spices produced by Indian companies MDH and Everest over suspected elevated levels of ethylene oxide, a cancer-causing pesticide.

In April 2024, the Singapore Food Agency and Hong Kong's Center for Food Safety banned two companies' curry powders which were found to contain ethylene oxide. Following this, Maldives was the third country to ban their products.

The US Food and Drug Administration (FDA) was also investigating them. The European Union (EU) has raised concerns of its own. Bangladesh and Australian food regulators have also launched investigations.
