= NU Hospitals =

NU Hospítals
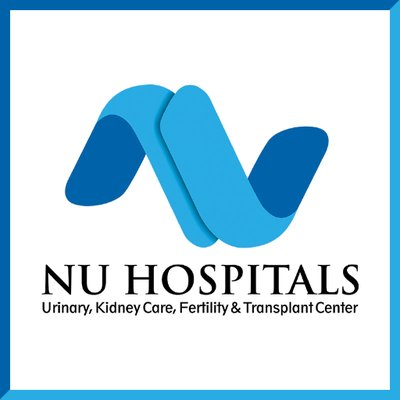

Geography
- Location: Bengaluru, Karnataka, India
- Coordinates: 13°00′44″N 77°33′10″E

Organisation
- Care system: Specialty Hospitals
- Type: Super-Speciality

Services
- Standards: NABH, NABL & ISAR

History
- Founded: 1999

Links
- Website: www.nuhospitals.com www.nufertility.com

NU Hospitals (Nephrology-Urology Hospitals) is a chain of dedicated Nephrology & Urology hospitals in India, established in 1999 as a super-specialty quaternary care hospital dedicated for Kidney care.

== History ==
NU Hospitals, established in the year 1999 by renowned Urologist Dr. Venkatesh Krishnamoorthy, as a super-specialty quaternary care hospital dedicated for Kidney care. Dr. Venkatesh Krishnamoorthy is the founder and chairman of NU Hospitals and recipient of Dr. B. C. Roy Award. Later the hospital is joined by Dr. Prasanna Venkatesh.

The hospital runs DNB (Urology) and Pediatric Urology post graduate training Fellowship Courses at its Padmanabhanagar, Bengaluru, branch.

The National Urology Renal and Fertility Centre (NU-RF) was established in Indira Gandhi Memorial Hospital, Republic of Maldives in November 2016.

== Awards and recognitions ==
- 2017 AHPI Award for Patient friendly Hospital
