= COVID-19 pandemic in the Maldives =

COVID-19 pandemic in Maldives
- Disease: COVID-19
- Pathogen: SARS-CoV-2
- Location: Maldives
- First outbreak: Wuhan, Hubei, China, via Italy
- Index case: Kuredu Resort & Spa
- Arrival date: 7 March 2020 (6 years, 8 months, 1 week and 4 days)
- Confirmed cases: 186,694
- Recovered: 186,371 (updated 23 July 2023)
- Deaths: 316
- Fatality rate: 0.17%

Government website
- covid19.health.gov.mv/en

The COVID-19 pandemic in Maldives was a part of the worldwide pandemic of coronavirus disease 2019 (COVID-19) caused by severe acute respiratory syndrome coronavirus 2 (SARS-CoV-2). The virus was confirmed to have spread to Maldives on 7 March 2020 from a 69-year-old Italian tourist who had returned to Italy after spending holidays in Kuredu Resort & Spa. The Health Protection Agency of Maldives confirmed two cases in Maldives, both employees of the resort. Following this, the hotel was locked down with several tourists stranded on the island. As of 11 March, the resorts of Kuredu, Vilamendhoo, Batalaa, and Kuramathi island were also placed under temporary quarantine. Schools were closed as a precaution.

Cases in the country spiked after a cluster emerged in the country's migrant worker community's dense living quarters, mostly composed of Bangladeshi, Indian, and Nepali migrant workers in May 2020. 2,420 foreigners have tested positive in the country with 1,857 Bangladeshi migrant workers have tested positive for the virus. The Maldivian government plans to relocate 3,000 Bangladeshi foreign workers to other islands in order to enable social distancing.

As of May 24, 2021, Maldives had the world's fastest-growing COVID-19 epidemic, with the highest number of infections per million people over the prior 7 and 14 days, according to data compiled by Bloomberg.

== Background ==
On 12 January 2020, the World Health Organization (WHO) confirmed that a novel coronavirus was the cause of a respiratory illness in a cluster of people in Wuhan, Hubei, China, which was reported to the WHO on 31 December 2019.

The case fatality ratio for COVID-19 has been much lower than SARS of 2003, but the transmission has been significantly greater, with a significant total death toll.

== Timeline ==
=== March 2020 ===
- On 7 March 2020, the Maldives confirmed its first two cases of COVID-19, who were foreign employees at Kuredhoo Island Resort. Both were believed to have caught the infection from an Italian tourist who tested positive for COVID-19 after returning to Italy. On 9 March, the Maldives confirmed two other COVID-19 cases tested positive. They too were tourists.
- The Maldives declared a public health emergency over COVID-19 on 12 March. As of 19 March, the Maldives had 13 positive cases and the lockdown status on Vilamendhoo and Bathala had been lifted.
- On 27 March, the government announced the first confirmed case of a Maldivian citizen with COVID-19, and that person is from the UK. This brought the total number of confirmed cases in the country to 16; the other 15 were foreign citizens. As of 29 March, there were 17 positive cases of COVID-19.

=== April to June 2020 ===
- On 30 April, Maldivian authorities reported their first death of coronavirus in the country, with the first victim being an 83-year-old woman that died en route to the hospital. The total number of confirmed cases since the start of the outbreak stood at 468.
- On May 15, 2020, more than 1,000 cases tested positive for COVID-19 in Maldives. By the end of May there had been 1,773 confirmed cases and five deaths.
- The total number of confirmed cases increased to 2,361 and the death toll rose to eight in June.

=== July to September 2020 ===
- The total number of confirmed cases increased to 3,793 and the death toll rose to 16 in July.
- On 25 August, former Maldivian President Maumoon Abdul Gayoom tested positive for COVID-19. The number of confirmed cases more than doubled to 7667 and the death toll increased to 28 in August.
- In September, the number of confirmed cases increased to 10,291 and the death toll rose to 34.

=== October to December 2020 ===
- In October, the number of confirmed cases increased to 11,659 and the death toll rose to 38.
- In November, the number of confirmed cases increased to 13,011 and the death toll rose to 46.
- In December, the number of confirmed cases increased to 13,757 and the death toll rose to 48.

=== January to December 2021 ===
- Mass vaccination commenced on 1 February, initially with 100,000 doses of AstraZeneca's Covishield vaccine donated by India. An unidentified benefactor donated 5,000 doses of the Sinopharm BIBP vaccine while China undertook to donate 100,000 doses of the same vaccine. India donated 100,000 additional doses of Covishield on 20 February. Four weeks after the start of the vaccination campaign, 111,415 people had received their first dose.
- On 2 February, Dr. Sheena Moosa of the Maldives Health Emergency Operations Center reported that the time-varying reproduction number R_{t} had risen to 5.
- On 23 February, the United Nations Children's Fund (UNICEF) announced that it had shipped 100,000 syringes to be used for both the AstraZeneca and Pfizer-BioNTech vaccine.
- As of 24 May 2021, Maldives had the world's fastest-growing COVID-19 epidemic, with the highest number of infections per million people over the prior 7 and 14 days, according to data compiled by Bloomberg. Doctors warned that increasing demand for COVID-19 care could hinder their ability to handle other health emergencies in the Maldives.
- At the start of July 191,441 persons had received two vaccine doses and 317,214 persons had received their first inoculation, rising to 264,913 and 321,764 persons by the end of the month.
- From 15 August, the vaccination campaign was extended to children between 12 and 17 years old. By the end of the month 302,182 persons had received two vaccine doses and 383,620 had received their first inoculation.
- The first case in the Maldives of the SARS-CoV-2 Omicron variant was confirmed on 5 December.
- The number of confirmed cases increased to 15,841 in January, 19,793 in February, 24,079 in March, 29,835 in April, 64,396 in May, 73,798 in June (of which 3,602 active cases), 77,432 in July (of which 2,601 active cases), 81,112 in August (of which 1,730 active cases), 84,809 in September (of which 1,591 active cases), 87,784 in October (of which 1,792 active cases), 91,650 in November (of which 1,613 active cases), and 95,700 in December (including 2,298 active cases).
- The death toll rose to 52 in January, 62 in February, 67 in March, 73 in April, 161 in May, 212 in June, 221 in July, 226 in August, 231 in September, 243 in October, 250 in November, and 262 in December.

=== January to December 2022 ===
- On 22 January, President Ibrahim Mohamed Solih announced he had tested positive for COVID-19.
- The public health emergency of 12 March 2020 was gradually removed in 2022, starting on 13 March.
- There were 89,993 confirmed cases in 2022, bringing the total number of cases to 185,693. 49 persons died, bringing the total death toll to 311.

=== January to December 2023 ===
- There were 1,001 confirmed cases in 2023, bringing the total number of cases to 186,694. Five persons died, bringing the total death toll to 316.

== Statistics ==
=== Charts ===
==== Confirmed new cases per day ====
View source data.

==== Confirmed deaths per day ====
View source data.

== Restrictions on travel to the Maldives ==
The government of the Maldives along with the Ministry of Tourism and with the guidance of the Health Protection Agency (HPA) placed a temporary travel restriction for the following countries to control new cases. No passengers originating from, transiting to, or with a travel history of said country/province is to be permitted into the Maldives. Maldivians and spouses of Maldivians who are foreign nationals will be allowed in but may be subject to quarantine measures.

Country	Effective Date	Source
China	Active from 4 February 2020	Ministry of Health
Iran	Active from 26 February 2020	Ministry of Health
South Korea (North and South Gyeongsang Provinces)	Active from 3 March 2020	Ministry of Health
Italy	Active from 8 March 2020	Ministry of Health
Bangladesh	Active from 24 March 2020	Ministry of Health
Germany (Bavaria, North Rhine-Westphalia and Baden-Württemberg)	Active from 15 March 2020	Ministry of Health
Spain (All provinces and regions)	Active from 15 March 2020	Ministry of Health
France (Île-de-France and Grand Est)	Active from 15 March 2020	Ministry of Health
Malaysia	Active from 17 March 2020	Ministry of Health
United Kingdom	Active from 19 March 2020	Ministry of Health
Sri Lanka	Active from 21 March 2020	Ministry of Health

== Quarantine facilities ==
The Maldivian government turned the resort island of Villivaru in the Kaafu Atoll into a quarantine facility, described as "the world's first coronavirus resort", where patients would enjoy a luxurious stay and free medical care.

According to Minister of Tourism Ali Waheed, the Maldives had 2,288 beds available for quarantine as of late March 2020.

== Impact ==
The Maldives' economy is dependent on tourism, which dropped severely due to travel restrictions amid the pandemic. Experts warned of an economic contraction and possible difficulties paying back foreign debt, especially to China and India.

Migrant workers in Maldives have been reported to face harsh treatment from their employers, such as wage theft, unsafe living and working conditions, passport confiscation, and deceptive recruitment practices. According to an investigation by Human Rights Watch, these migrant labor abuses have worsened due to COVID-19 pandemic that resulted in job loss and forced labor without any pay.

== Details of the initial confirmed cases ==
Case	Date	Age	Gender	Nationality	Hospital admitted	Source of infection	Status	Notes	Source
1	7 March 2020	Not disclosed	Female	Turkish	Farukolhu Fushi Isolation Center	Italy	Recovered	First case in the Maldives. Italian tourist linked the local transmission	Ministry of Health
2	7 March 2020	Not disclosed	Male	South African	Farukolhu Fushi Isolation Center	Italy	Recovered	First case in the Maldives. Italian tourist linked the local transmission	Ministry of Health

== See also ==
- Aasandha
- COVID-19 pandemic by country and territory
- COVID-19 pandemic death rates by country
- COVID-19 pandemic in Asia
- Deployment of COVID-19 vaccines
- Health in Maldives
- National responses to the COVID-19 pandemic
