= Shah Mahir =

Maldivian politician

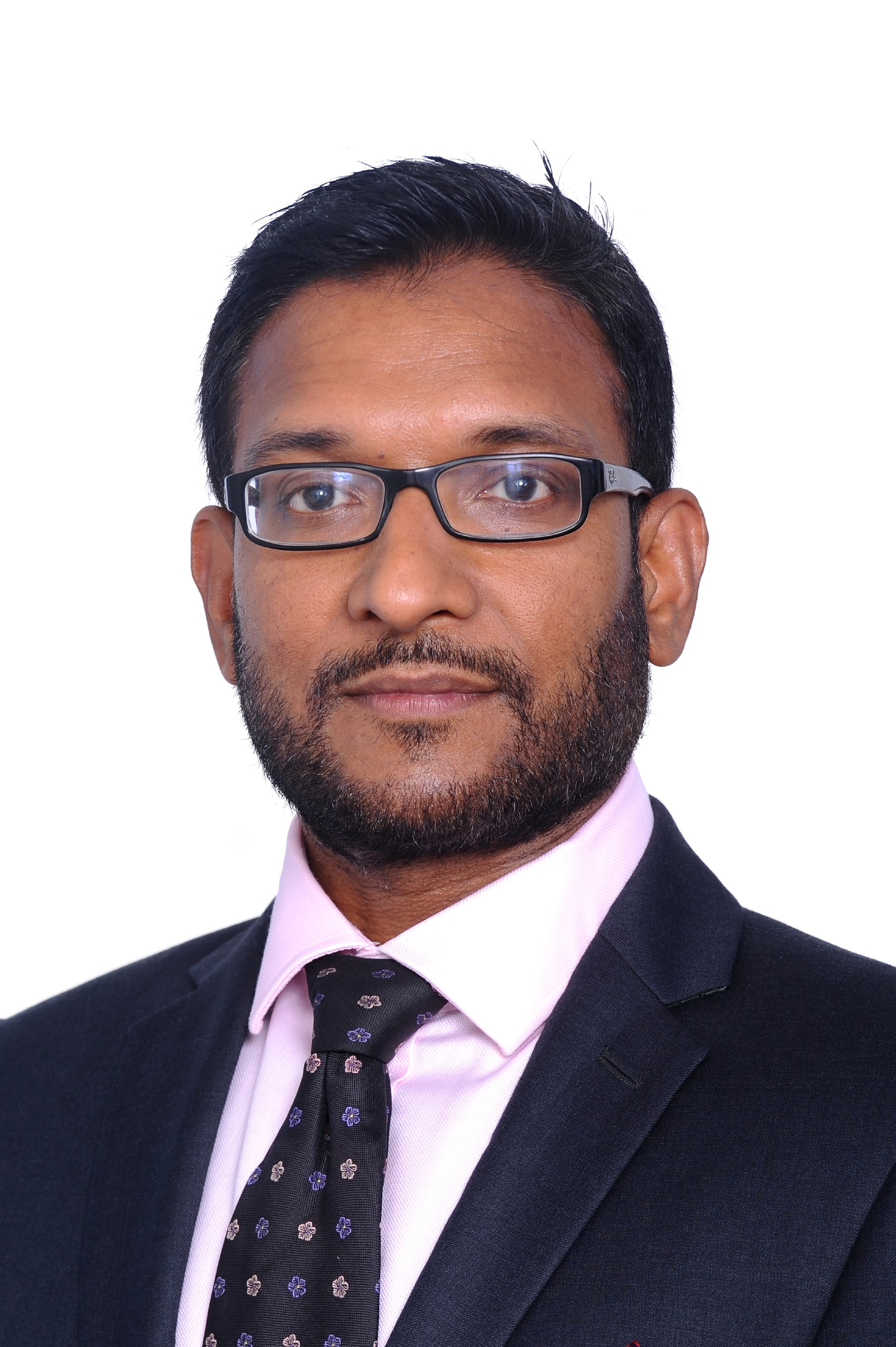

State Minister of Health

Personal details
- Born: 10 August 1973 (age 53) Malé, Maldives
- Education: Imperial College London
- Profession: Medical Doctor

Shah Abdullah Mahir is the minister of state of Ministry of Health of Maldives. He was appointed as the head of the Maldives National Food and Drug Authority on 15 January 2019. Dr. Shah Mahir is a former officer in the Maldives National Defense Force (MNDF).

He is also an orthopedic surgeon and one of the leading experts in the policy formulation in governments response in Management of the COVID-19 pandemic in the Maldives.
