= 2024 India–Maldives diplomatic row =

Indian-Maldivian diplomatic incident

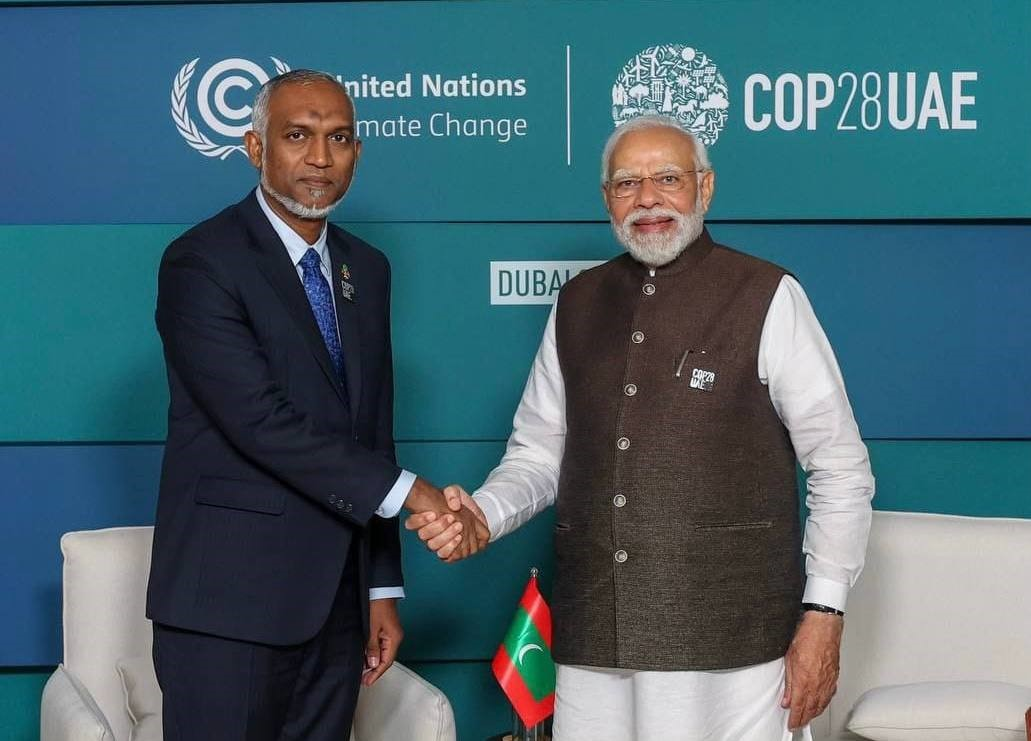
Indian Prime Minister Narendra Modi (right) meeting Maldivian President Mohamed Muizzu (left) at the 2023 United Nations Climate Change Conference.

In January 2024, relations between India and the Maldives, traditionally close neighbors with strong historical and cultural ties, became strained due to derogatory remarks made by Maldivian cabinet ministers and concerns over racism directed at Indian Prime Minister Narendra Modi and India as a whole.

Reactions in India called for a boycott of vacations to the Maldives. The dispute with the Maldives also led to the death of a young Maldivian teenager who was waiting to be transported to India for medical treatment via an air ambulance. His family's request for evacuation was denied by Maldivian authorities.

== Background ==
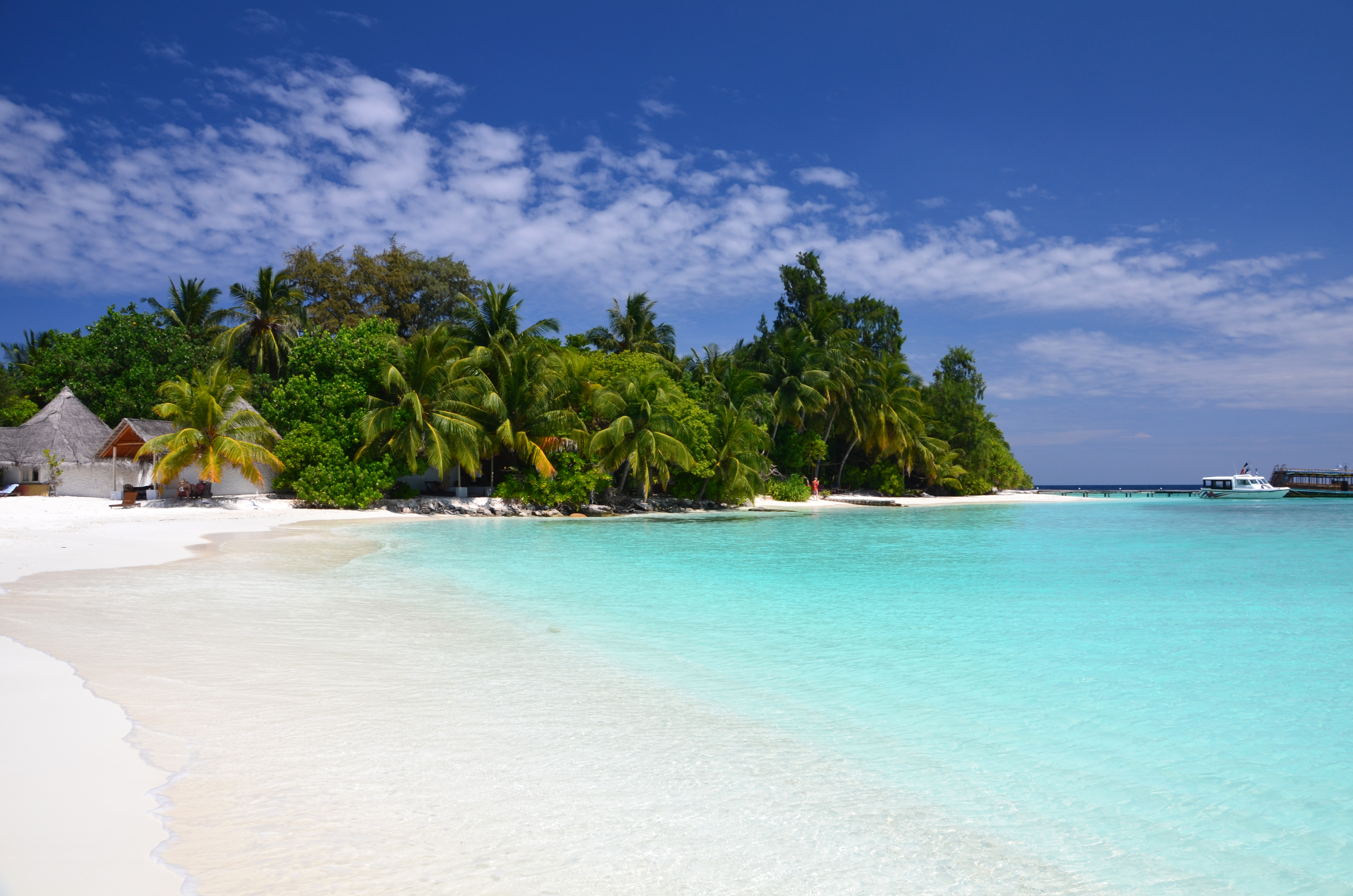
Bathala island in the Maldives

The 2023 Maldivian presidential election saw Mohamed Muizzu come into power. A key campaign topic was the Maldives' relationship with China and India. The incumbent, Ibrahim Mohamed Solih, campaigned on an "India-first" policy, aiming to strengthen ties with the Maldives' geographical and cultural neighbour, India. In contrast, Muizzu adopted the slogan "India Out," calling for the withdrawal of Indian military personnel stationed on the archipelago while campaigning for closer relations with China. This stance aligned with the policies of former president Abdulla Yameen, founder of the People's National Congress, under whom the Maldives joined China's Belt and Road Initiative.

Muizzu was elected president in the second round, winning 54.04% of the vote against the incumbent Solih's 46.04%. He was sworn in as the new president on 17 November 2023. CCP general secretary Xi Jinping of China welcomed the election, while Indian Prime Minister Narendra Modi congratulated Muizzu and conveyed his "good wishes for the strengthening of democracy, peace, and prosperity in the country."

== Derogatory remarks ==
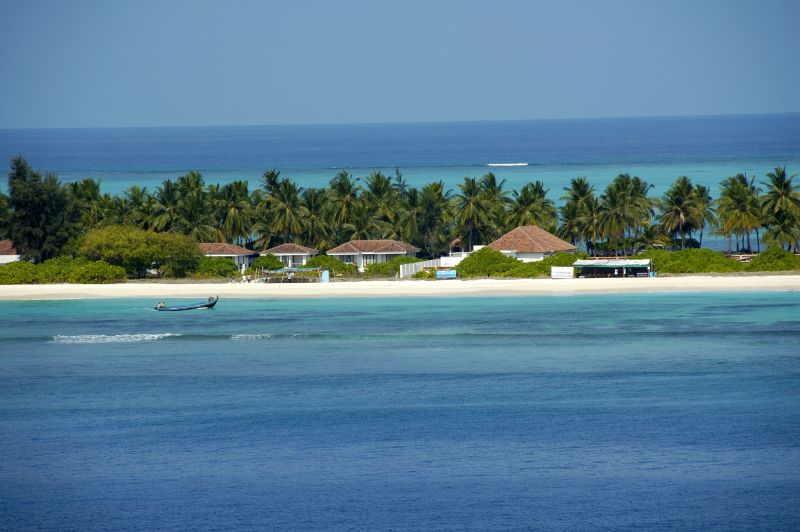
Kadmat Island, Lakshwadeep

In January, Prime Minister Narendra Modi visited Lakshwadeep, a union territory of India in the Indian Ocean, and posted pictures of an island in Lakshadweep on his Instagram account as part of the Indian government's effort to boost tourism and promote development in the region. This prompted many Indians to search for and take an interest in the islands. Indian social media users began comparing the Maldives, a popular tourist destination for many Indians, with their own domestic islands in Lakshadweep. In response, Zahid Rameez, a member of the Progressive Party of Maldives, accused the Indian government of "copying a small economy like Sri Lanka," triggering an online boycott of Maldivian tourism. He further stirred controversy by tweeting that India would be "delusional" to offer service and cleanliness comparable to the Maldives.

On 7 January, three sitting Maldivian deputy ministers—Malsha Shareef, Mariyam Shiuna, and Abdulla Mahzoom Majid—made derogatory and racist remarks about Prime Minister Modi and Indians on social media, coinciding with his visit. The remarks triggered strong reactions in India, leading the Indian High Commission in the Maldives to raise the issue with the Maldivian government. Under President Mohamed Muizzu, the Maldivian government swiftly distanced itself from the comments, suspending the three ministers and emphasizing that their opinions did not reflect the official stance. On the same day, the Maldivian government issued a statement condemning the derogatory remarks, clarifying that these opinions were personal and did not represent the government's official position. The statement reaffirmed the government's commitment to freedom of expression, exercised in a democratic and responsible manner, and emphasized that such comments should not hinder close relations with India. It also indicated that relevant authorities may take action against individuals making such remarks.

In April, Mariyam Shiuna, one of the suspended ministers, made a mocking Twitter post about the Indian flag. Following the uproar over the post, she issued an apology.

== Reaction ==
=== India ===
The remarks by the Maldivian ministers led to widespread outrage in India, with many people canceling planned vacations to the island country. The hashtag "#BoycottMaldives" began trending on social media.

Opposition leader and politician Sharad Pawar stated, "He is the Prime Minister of our country, and if anyone from another country holding any position makes such comments about our PM, we won't accept it. We must respect the PM's position. We won't accept anything against the Prime Minister from outside the country."

Indian tourists to the Maldives dipped by 42% in the first four months of 2024 in comparison to the same period in 2023. "

=== Maldives ===
Former President Mohamed Nasheed stated, "The people of the Maldives are sorry; we are sorry that this has happened." He also expressed a desire for Indian tourists to visit during their holidays and assured that this incident would not affect the country's hospitality. He urged the government to resolve the dispute with India.

== Rise in tensions ==
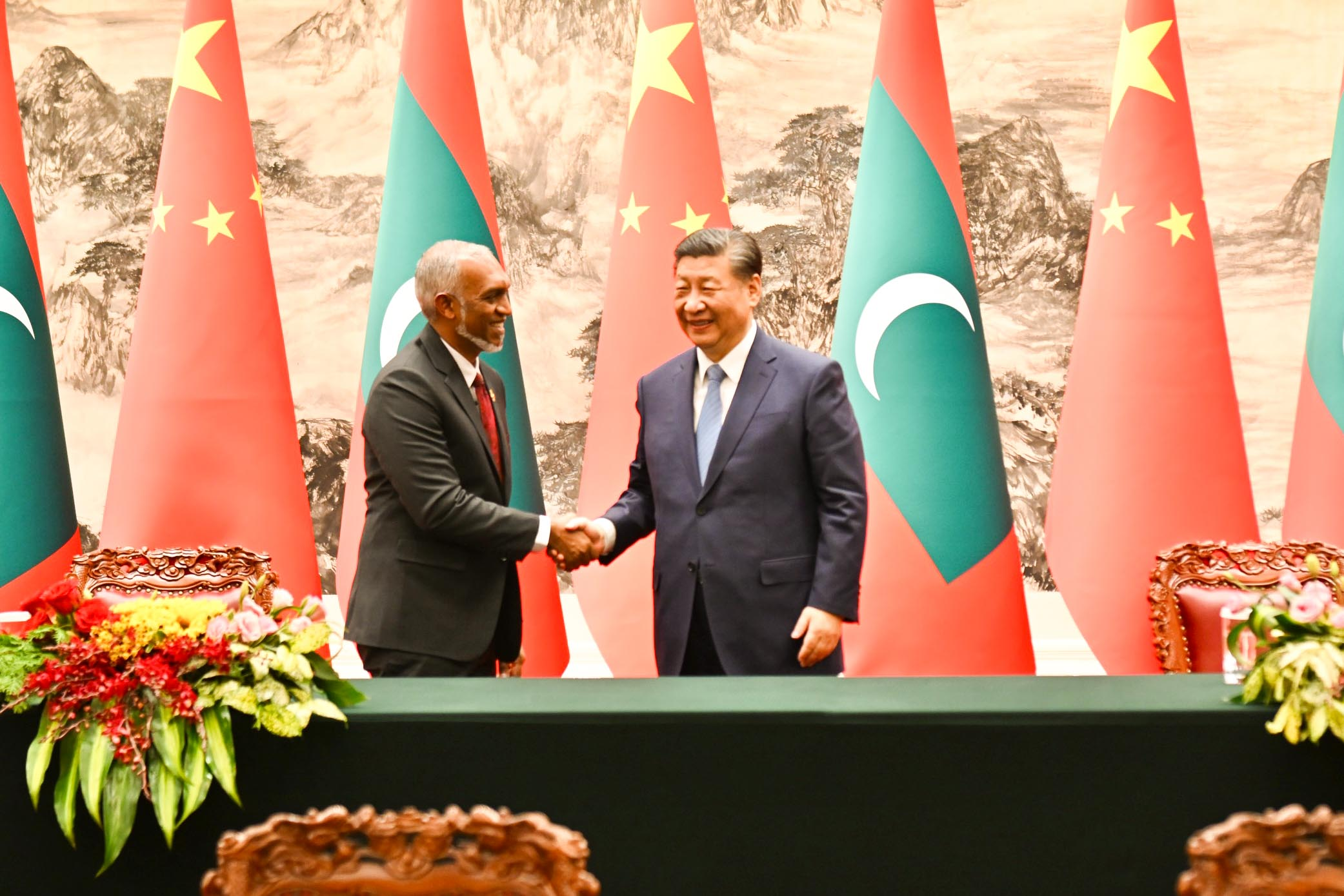
Muizzu (left) meeting Xi Jinping in January 2024

On 7 January 2024, Muizzu arrived in China on an invitation extended by CCP general secretary Xi Jinping. As a pro-China candidate, Muizzu's presidential campaign focused on reducing Indian influence in Maldivian affairs. Observers have described him as pro-China. On 13 January, in an interview after returning from China, Muizzu stated:

We, our country maybe small. But that doesn't give you the license to bully us!

In pre-office interviews, Muizzu stated that all Indian troops should leave the Maldives. As of 2023, the Maldivian Defense Ministry reported that around 90 Indian personnel were stationed in the country, operating aircraft provided by India.

Following a state visit to China, Muizzu requested that India withdraw its troops by 10 May, linking the conflict to the sovereignty of the Maldives. He views India's failure to withdraw its troops as a sign of disrespect towards the Maldives' democracy. After the second India-Maldives high-level core group meeting, Malé announced that India would replace its military personnel involved in operating its base in the Maldives. India stated only that both sides had agreed on a set of "Mutually Workable Solutions." The Maldivian government announced that 51 of these soldiers were repatriated to India on 6 May. By 10 May, the last batch of Indian soldiers stationed in the Maldives had been repatriated.

On 9 May, Indian Ministry of External Affairs (MEA) spokesperson Randhir Jaiswal announced a diplomatic meeting between Indian Foreign Minister S. Jaishankar and his Maldivian counterpart, Zameer. The MEA spokesperson also confirmed the appointment of "competent Indian technical personnel" to replace the Indian troops. These personnel are essential for operating Indian aviation platforms, which are crucial for evaluation, humanitarian assistance, and disaster response activities in the Maldives.

The move was confirmed again by Maldivian Minister of Foreign Affairs Moosa Zameer on 11 May, stating that 78 Indian military personnel would be replaced by civilian employees from Hindustan Aeronautics Limited to continue operating the Indian aviation platforms gifted to the Maldives. Later, the Maldivian defense minister admitted that the country's defense forces were still not capable of flying the aircraft donated by India.

== See also ==
- India–Maldives relations
- Presidency of Mohamed Muizzu
- China–Maldives relations
