= Maldives government buildings fire =

2024 fire that affected 3 ministries in Malé, Maldives

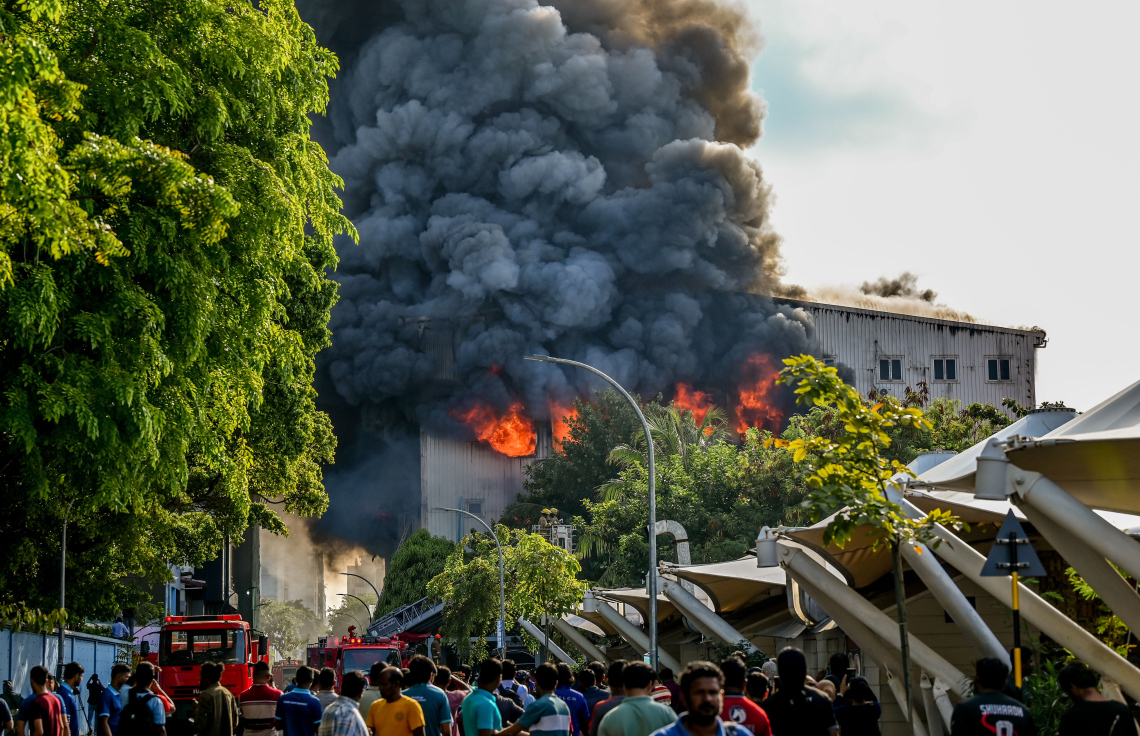
- Date: 12 December 2024
- Location: Ameenee Magu, Maafannu, Malé, Maldives
- Type: Structure fire
- Cause: Electrical short circuit
- Outcome: Significant damage to the buildings beyond repair
- Deaths: 0

Maldives government buildings fire broke out at approximately 06:30 local time (1:30 UTC) on 12 December 2024. The fire started in the building housing the Ministry of Housing, Land and Urban Development as well as the Ministry of Construction and Infrastructure, which quickly spread to the nearby Green Building which housed the Ministry of Climate Change, Environment and Energy, and the Vital Registration Office of the Malé City Council.

== About the Fire ==
The fire broke out during the opening hours of the Housing Ministry on 12 December 2024. The fire quickly spread to the Construction Ministry as well as the Environment Ministry. Firefighters arrived on the scene approximately after the fire had started. The Health Protection Agency (HPA) issued a health advisory saying to not be near the fire unless necessary. Police evacuated nearby residents and occupants in the affected area. The National Disaster Management Authority (NDMA) established an emergency evacuation centre in Social Centre to help the affected people, where 50 people requested help. It took over six hours to bring the fire under control. President Mohamed Muizzu and Construction and Infrastructure Minister Abdulla Muththalib arrived at the scene to assess the situation. The fire led to the complete halt of operation for the Ministry of Housing, Land and Urban Development, Ministry of Construction and Infrastructure, and the Ministry of Environment. The ministries were temporarily relocated to Dharubaaruge a few days later. The Vital Registration Office was relocated to the first floor of Amin Avenue in Hulhumalé.

== Concerns and recovery ==
During the fire, there were many concerns that Malé residents’ births, deaths and residential documents such as house registries and building permits at the office impacted in the fire. Other concerns were the loss of Binveriyaa and Gedhoruveriyaa schemes, where later an official from the Housing Ministry assured that the schemes were stored in the Ministry's cloud. The Department of National Registration (DNR) and the Department of Judicial Administration (DJA) agreed to send digital copies of important documents over to the Malé City Council that was lost.

Another concern was the loss of data on the Housing Ministry's server, which the government later sent the server to Singapore for data recovery.

== Investigation ==
According to the commissioner of police (CP) Ali Shujau, stated that foreign assistance will be sought to investigate how the fire started. Some alleged that the fire was intentionally started to destroy evidence related to the recent alleged corruption of the Housing Development Corporation (HDC), which was denied by the police. In a joint investigation between the Maldives Police Service and international forensic experts, they determined that the fire was started as a result of an electrical short circuit.

Former President Abdulla Yameen alleged that the fire was deliberately started by an associate of President Muizzu to deliberately destroy evidence regarding corruption cases involving Muizzu during his tenure as the Mayor of Malé and claimed that case files with alleged corruption cases against Muizzu had gone missing from the Anti Corruption Commission. He alleged that the police knew who was behind the fire but did not want to take action due to the close ties between that person and Muizzu. Regarding the allegations, Home Minister Ali Ihusaan instructed authorities to investigate Yameen's claims as well as to question him regarding details in his possession and to explore any leads. He also asked the National Integrity Commission to look into the allegations agasint the police force.
