= Dharampal Gulati =

Indian businessman (1923–2020)

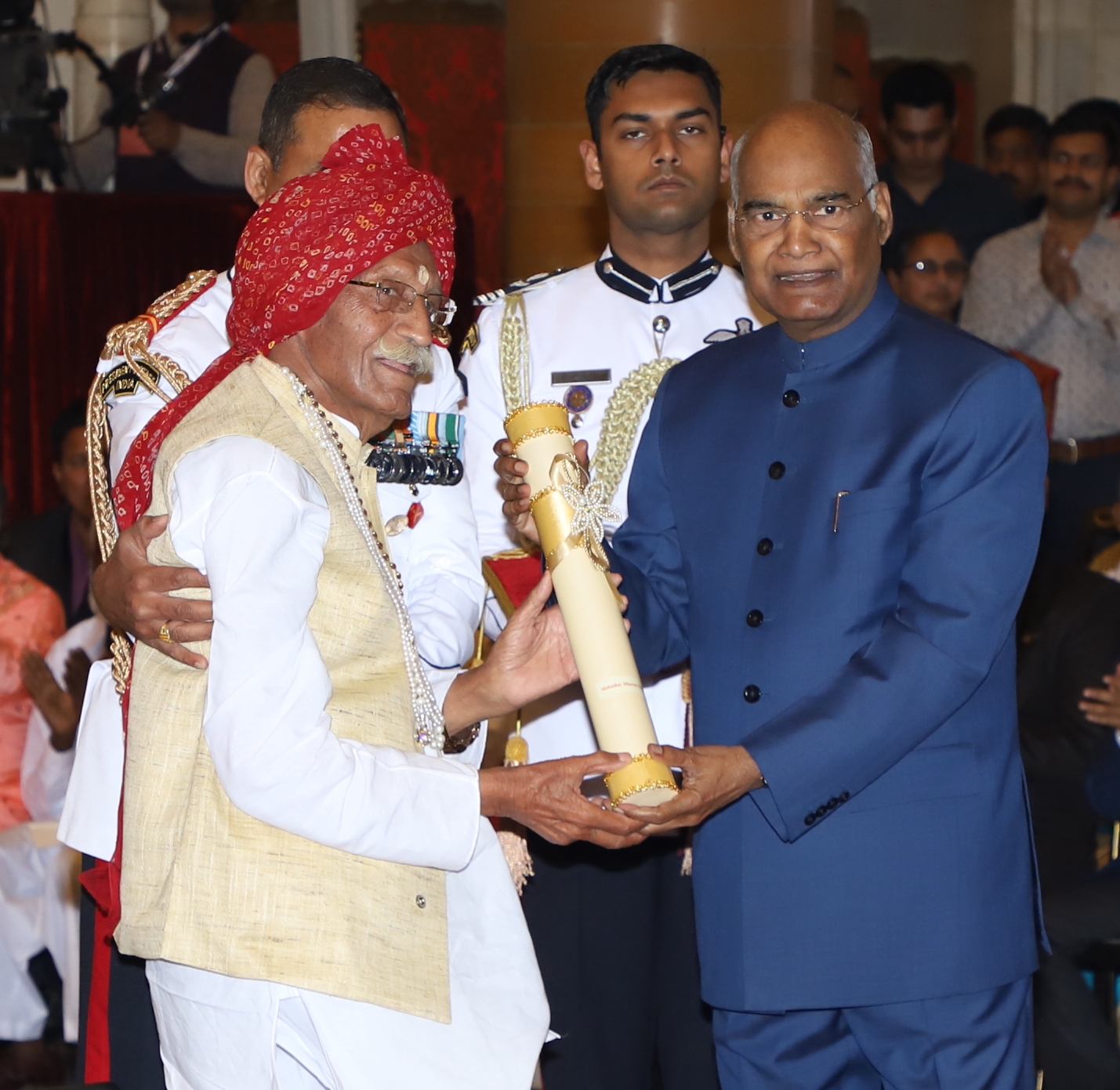
- Gulati receiving the Padma Bhushan from the President of India Ramnath Kovind, 2019
- Born: 27 March 1923; Sialkot, Punjab, British India
- Died: 3 December 2020 (aged 97); New Delhi, India
- Occupations: Founder and CEO of MDH
- Awards: Padma Bhushan (2019)

Dharampal Gulati (27 March 1923 – 3 December 2020), also known as Mahashay Dharampal Gulati, (Note: Mahashay is an Indian honorific meaning 'sir' or 'gentleman'.) was an Indian businessman, and founder and CEO of MDH (Mahashian Di Hatti; transl. "gentlemen's shop"), an Indian spice company.

He was referred to as 'spice-king' in reference to his pioneering of ready-to-use ground spices. He was awarded the Padma Bhushan, India's third highest civilian award, in 2019.

== Early life ==
Gulati was born on 27 March 1923 in Sialkot in present-day Pakistan. His father, Chunnilal Gulati, had a spice shop in the town named Mahashian Di Hatti, which was also known by the name Deggi Mirch Wale. In 1933, at the age of 10, he dropped out of school and worked assorted jobs, including carpentry, rice trading, and selling hardware, before joining in to help his father in his spice business.

Joining his father's spice shop in Sialkot, Gulati helped expand the store to Lahore, Shekhupura, Nankana Sahib, Lyallpur, and Multan in Punjab. He recounts the business in Mallika Ahluwalia's book, Divided by Partition: United by Resilience, growing with a turnover between ₹500 and ₹800 per day during this time.

However, in 1947, with the partition of India, the family was forced to leave Sialkot and make the journey across to what would be present day India. The family spent time in a refugee camp in Amritsar before making it across to New Delhi, to join his sister. He bought a tonga (English: horse carriage) for ₹650, and operated around New Delhi railway station, Qutab Road, and Karol Bagh to make ends meet. Finding other tangawallas uncouth, and with little monetary reward, he opened a small stall to sell cane sugar which he shut down due to no prospects.

== Career ==
In 1958, he set up a small wooden pop-up store in the Karol Bagh region of New Delhi to restart his father's spice store and restored it with the same name, Mahashian Di Hatti. He advertised in the popular Hindi newspaper, Pratap, increasing the store's popularity. He set up his second store in Chandni Chowk, again in New Delhi, before buying land and setting up a manufacturing facility in the Kirti Nagar area of New Delhi in 1959. During this time, when most Indians would grind spices at home, he pioneered the concept of ready-to-use ground spices. The company was registered as MDH (an abbreviation of Mahashian Di Hatti) in 1965.

He is credited with the growth of the company to having 18 manufacturing facilities and revenues of ₹10.95 billion (equivalent to ₹16 billion or US$170 million in 2026) in 2018. In the previous year, he was the highest-paid fast-moving consumer goods CEO in India, earning over ₹210 million (equivalent to ₹320 million or US$3.3 million in 2026). During this period, he was also noted for pioneering entrepreneurial brand marketing in India, with him serving as "Brand mascot, brand icon and brand ambassador". His image with ethnic wear of a turban, hook moustache, glasses and pearl necklace was printed on all of his company's spice packages as well as on advertising messages, making him one of the most endearing and likeable brand ambassadors in the country, according to brand consultants.

=== Positions ===
- Managing director – Super Delicacies Private Limited
- Director – Mahashian Di Hatti Private Limited
- Chairman – Mata Chanan Devi Hospital, New Delhi

== Personal life and death ==
Gulati founded 20 schools for furthering primary and secondary education, including the MDH International School, Mahashay Chunnilal Saraswati Shishu Mandir, Mata Lilawati Kanya Vidyalaya and Mahashay Dharampal Vidya Mandir. He set up a 200-bed hospital for the poor in New Delhi and a mobile hospital for slum dwellers. His charity foundation, with his father's name, Mahashay Chunnilal Charitable Trust, administers some of his charity initiatives. During the COVID-19 pandemic, he gave money to the Chief Minister's relief fund and donated 7,500 PPE kits to healthcare workers in the union territory of Delhi.

Gulati was awarded with Padma Bhushan, India's third highest civilian honour, in 2019.

Gulati died on 3 December 2020, at the Mata Chanan Devi Hospital in Delhi of cardiac arrest due to post COVID-19 complications. He had been admitted to the hospital in November. He was aged 97.
