= High Commission of the Maldives, London =

Diplomatic mission of the Maldives in the UK

High Commission of the Maldives in London އިނގިރޭސިވިލާތުގައި ހުންނަ ދިވެހިރާއްޖޭގެ ހައިކޮމިޝަން
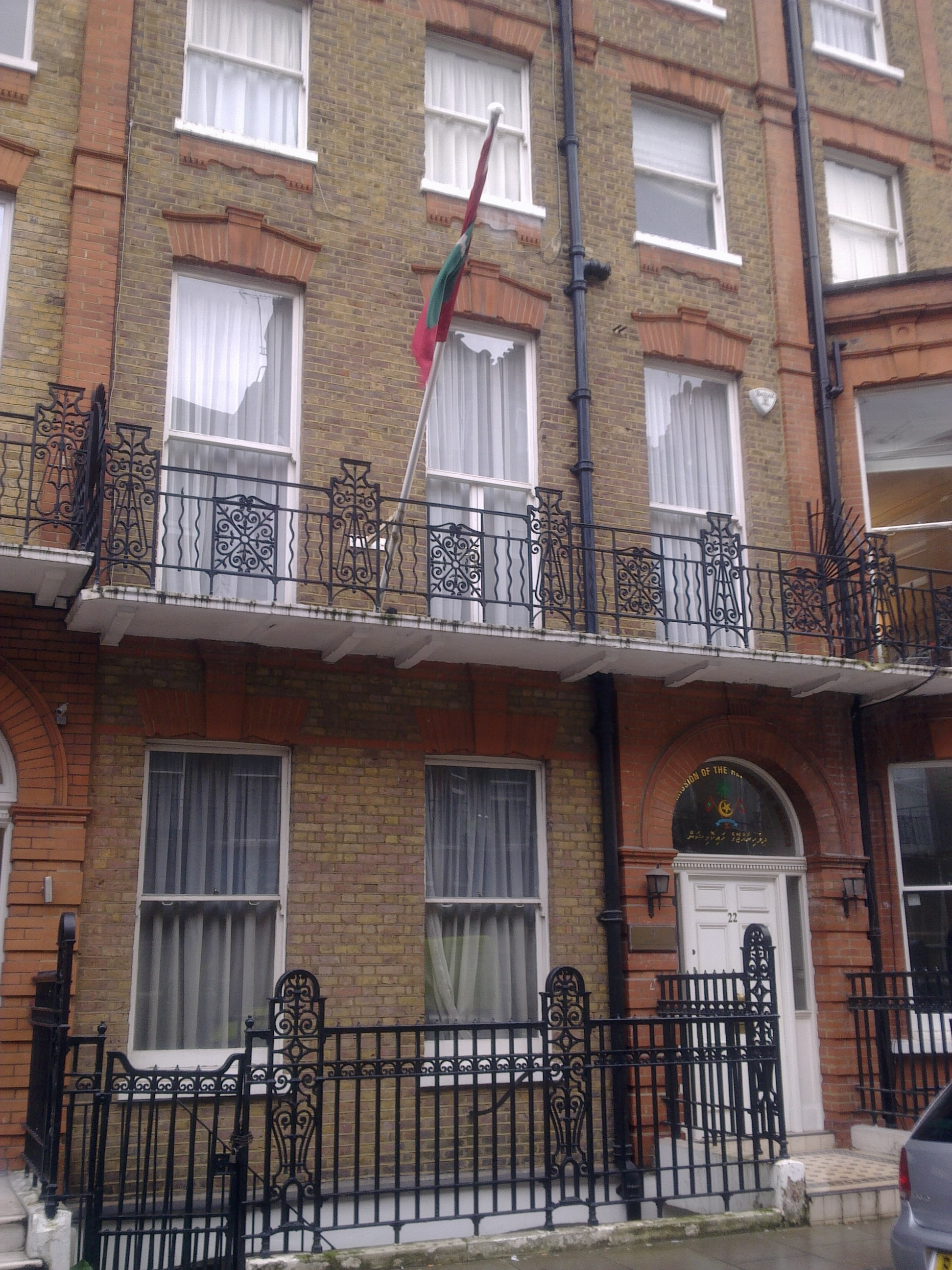
- Location: Marylebone, London
- Address: 22 Nottingham Place, London, W1U 5NJ
- Coordinates: 51°31′17.8″N 0°9′10.7″W
- High Commissioner: Iruthisham Adam

The High Commission of the Maldives in London (Dhivehi: އިނގިރޭސިވިލާތުގައި ހުންނަ ދިވެހިރާއްޖޭގެ ހައިކޮމިޝަން) is the diplomatic mission of the Maldives in the United Kingdom.

== History ==
The High Commission of the Maldives was established in 1995 by upgrading the existing Maldives Government Trade Representative’s Office; it was officially opened by former Maldivian President Maumoon Abdul Gayoom.

This mission had once been called the Embassy of the Maldives in London (Dhivehi: އިނގިރޭސިވިލާތުގައި ހުންނަ ދިވެހިރާއްޖޭގެ އެމްބަސީ) from October 2016, when the Maldives withdrew from the Commonwealth, to February 2020.

The diplomatic mission reverted to being the High Commission of the Maldives on 1 February 2020, when the Maldives rejoined the Commonwealth.

== Gallery ==
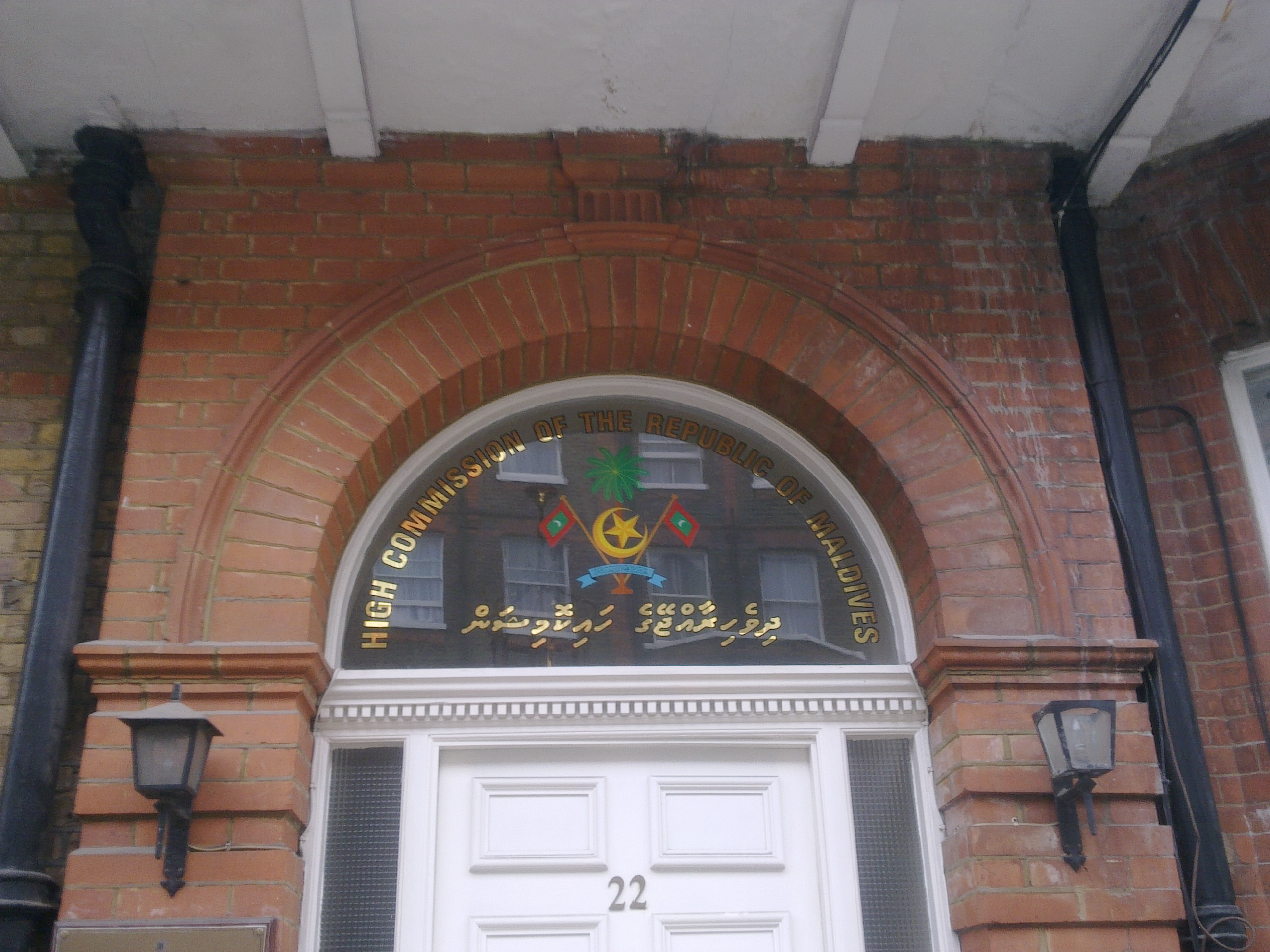
Close-up of the entrance

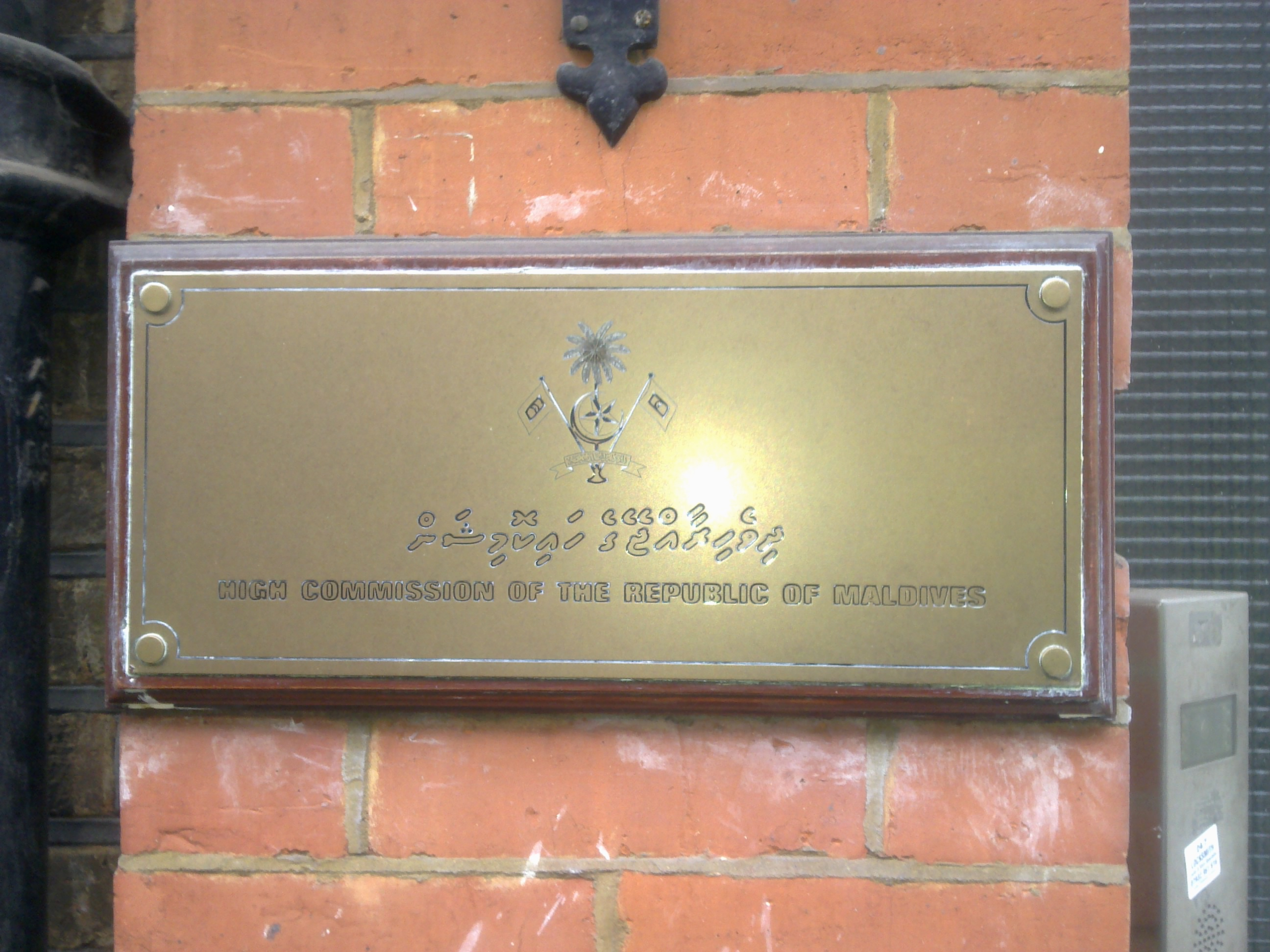
Plaque outside the High Commission in Divehi and English depicting the Emblem of Maldives
