= Indira Gandhi Memorial Hospital =

Indira Gandhi Memorial Hospital އިންދިރާ ގާންދީ މެމޯރިއަލް ހޮސްޕިޓަލް

Geography
- Location: Kanbaa Aisa Rani Higun, Malé, Maldives
- Coordinates: 4.1734°N 73.5014°E

Organisation
- Care system: Tertiary
- Type: General

Services
- Emergency department: Yes
- Beds: 300

History
- Opened: 15 April 1995

Links
- Website: www.igmh.gov.mv

The Indira Gandhi Memorial Hospital (IGMH, Dhivehi: އިންދިރާ ގާންދީ މެމޯރިއަލް ހޮސްޕިޓަލް) is a state-owned Multi-Speciality hospital, and one of four hospitals in Malé, Republic of Maldives. The hospital is located at the west end of Malé. The hospital is a gift from the Indian Government and is dedicated to Indira Gandhi. It is the largest government healthcare facility, providing tertiary level healthcare in the Maldives. Located in the capital city Male’, with approximately 300 beds, IGMH provides services to around 150,000 people living in the city, plus specialist referral services for patients both domestic and foreign. Along with specialist consultations, IGMH houses investigative and imaging technologies in diagnostics. It fully covered by Aasandha social healthcare insurance.

IGMH replaced the previous sole hospital, Central Hospital, located at the center of Malé. Central Hospital was later demolished and the location was leased to a private party by the Government to make another hospital.

== History ==
The Maldivian government began providing healthcare services at a national level 75 years ago, with the first healthcare facility providing modern medical care being established on 11 January 1948 under the name “Dakutaruge”. After this, the government established and started the medical healthcare services in Central Hospital.

In October 1986, the Maldivian government requested India's assistance in building a large scale hospital during Rajiv Gandhi's official visit. It was agreed to by Rajiv Gandhi; two years later, India and Maldives signed a memorandum of understanding in October 1988. The foundation was laid on 14 January 1990 and it took almost 5 years to complete the hospital.

The hospital was officially handed over to the Maldivian Government by the Indian Union Minister for Urban Development, Shrimathi Sheila Kaul, on 2 February 1994. It was officially inaugurated on 15 April 1995, by P. V. Narasimha Rao. Central Hospital's services were moved to the current facility, with the help of Indian Government and the name was changed to Indira Gandhi Memorial Hospital, on 21 April 1996.

IGMH has been establishing new specialist departments over the recent years, nearing to a total of 21 departments by the beginning of 2018.

== Services ==
IGMH provides a wide variety of services across several departments. The major departments are:

- Anesthesiology
- Cardiology
- Dentistry
- Dermatology
- Dietetics & Nutrition
- Emergency & Trauma
- Endocrinology
- ENT (Ear, Nose & Throat)
- Internal Medicine
- Laboratory Medicine
- Nephrology
- Neurology
- Neurosurgery
- Obstetrics & Gynecology
- Oncology
- Ophthalmology
- Orthopaedics
- Paediatrics
- Physiotherapy
- Psychiatry
- Pulmonology (Respiratory)
- Radiology
- Speech Therapy
- Surgery
- Urology
