= Bathala (island) =

Bathalaa
- uninhabited island
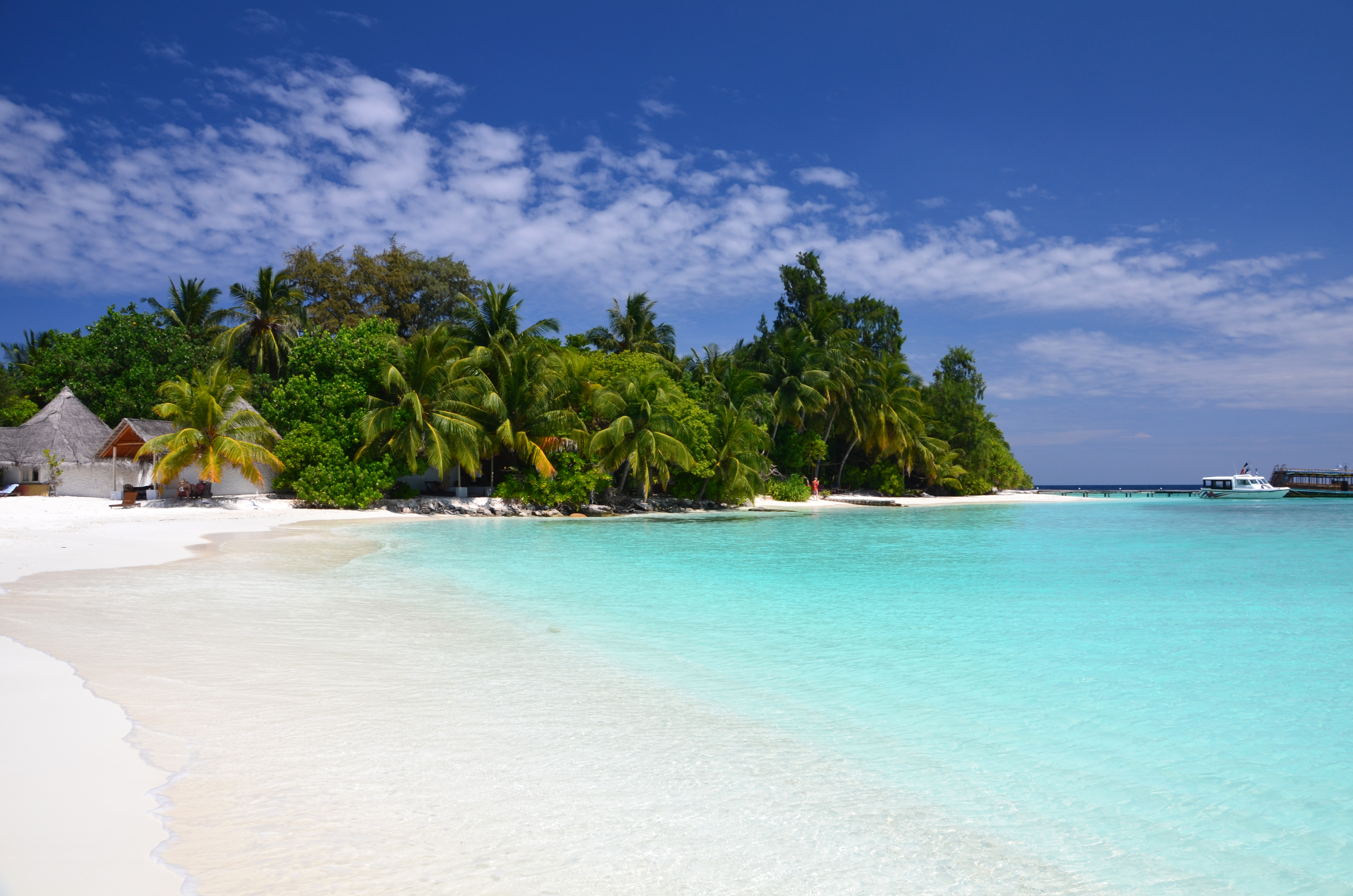

- Location in Maldives
- Coordinates: 04°04′13″N 72°56′43″E
- Country: Maldives
- Administrative atoll: Alif Alif Atoll
- Distance to Malé: 147.97 km (91.94 mi)

Dimensions
  - Length: 0.150 km (0.093 mi)
  - Width: 0.300 km (0.186 mi)

Population
  - Total: 0
- Time zone: UTC+05:00 (MST)

Bathala is a small Maldivian island in the Ari Atoll. The oval-shaped resort island is approximately 150 m long and 300 m wide.
