= Dharumavantha School =

Public school in Malé, Maldives

Dharumavantha School ދަރުމަވަންތަ ސްކޫލް

Location
- Falhumathee Magu; Machchangolhi; Malé, Kaafu Atoll; Maldives
- Coordinates: 4.169966°N 73.509441°E

Information
- Type: Public school
- Motto: Faith, Discipline and Wisdom
- Founded: 1 January 2002; 23 years ago
- Principal: Nadhira Hassan
- Houses: 4
- Colours: Blue and Silver
- Slogan: Everyone can Learn, Achieve and Excel
- Website: www.dharuma.edu.mv
- Last updated: 4 September 2024

Dharumavantha School (Dhivehi: ދަރުމަވަންތަ ސްކޫލް) is a public and coeducational school in Malé, Maldives. The school is named in remembrance of Dharumavantha Rasgefaanu who converted the people of Maldives to Islam in 1553 A.D. The school was established in January 2002 with the split of the Majeedhiya School campus into two separate single gender schools, the newly formed school being Dharumavantha. With the establishment of a second male-gender secondary school, the staff and students of Majeedhiya School were split, with half transferred to the new school.

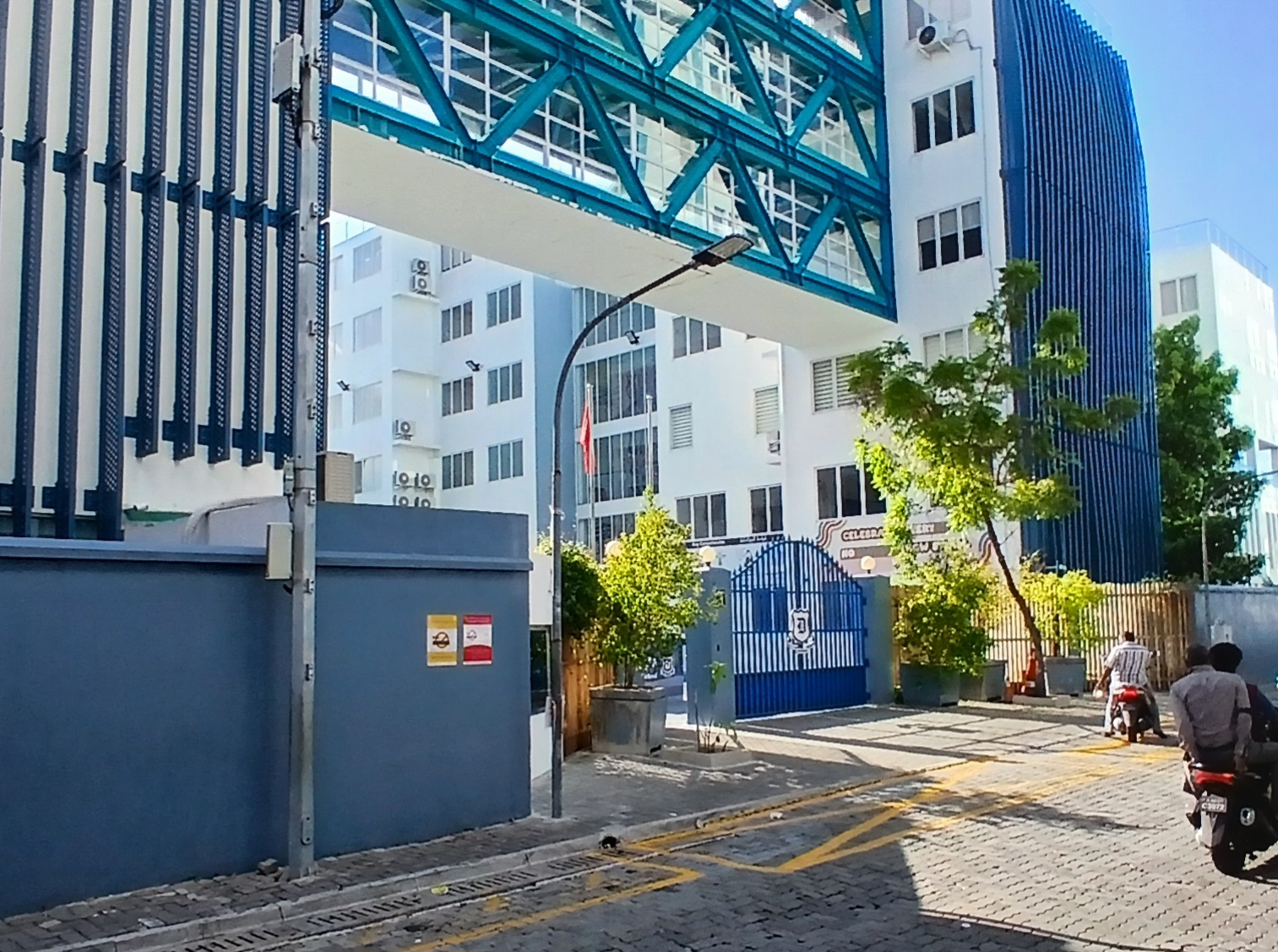
Front entrance of Dharumavantha school

== History ==
In 2010, the new government decided to introduce coeducation as well as primary grades in all of the four single gender secondary schools in the city. In 2011, Dharumavantha School welcomed the first co-educational batch of students admitted into the newly formed primary Grade 1 in the school. The change did not affect the current secondary school operations, which is to run as a single gender school until the new co-educational batch progresses to the secondary level.

In 2023, Dharumavantha School was relocated to a building in front of Villa College.

In 2024, the Education Ministry decided to move all Izzudheen School students to Dharumavantha after cracks were found in the building, with exceptions for students who want to change to other schools.

Dharumavantha School serves roughly 850 students in grades 1–10.
