= Izzudheen School =

Public school in Malé, Maldives

- ޢިއްޒުއްދީން ސްކޫލު

Location
- Falhumathee Magu; Machchangolhi; Malé, Kaafu Atoll; Maldives; 4.170225°N 73.509218°E

Information
- Other names: Izzuddin, I'zzudhdheen
- School type: Public
- Motto: Dhivehi: ޙައްޤު ތެދު ހޯދެށެވެ (Seek Truth)
- Religious affiliation: Islam
- Established: 12 January 2020
- Status: Closed
- Closed: 26 September 2024
- Teaching staff: 29 (2020)
- Employees: 48 (2020)
- Grades: 1-6
- Last updated: 26 September 2024

Izzudheen School (Note: Dhivehi: ޢިއްޒުއްދީން ސްކޫލް, also spelled as I'zzudhdheen, Izzuddin) was a school located in Malé, Maldives. It was inaugurated by former president, Ibrahim Mohamed Solih. It was a single session school.

== History ==
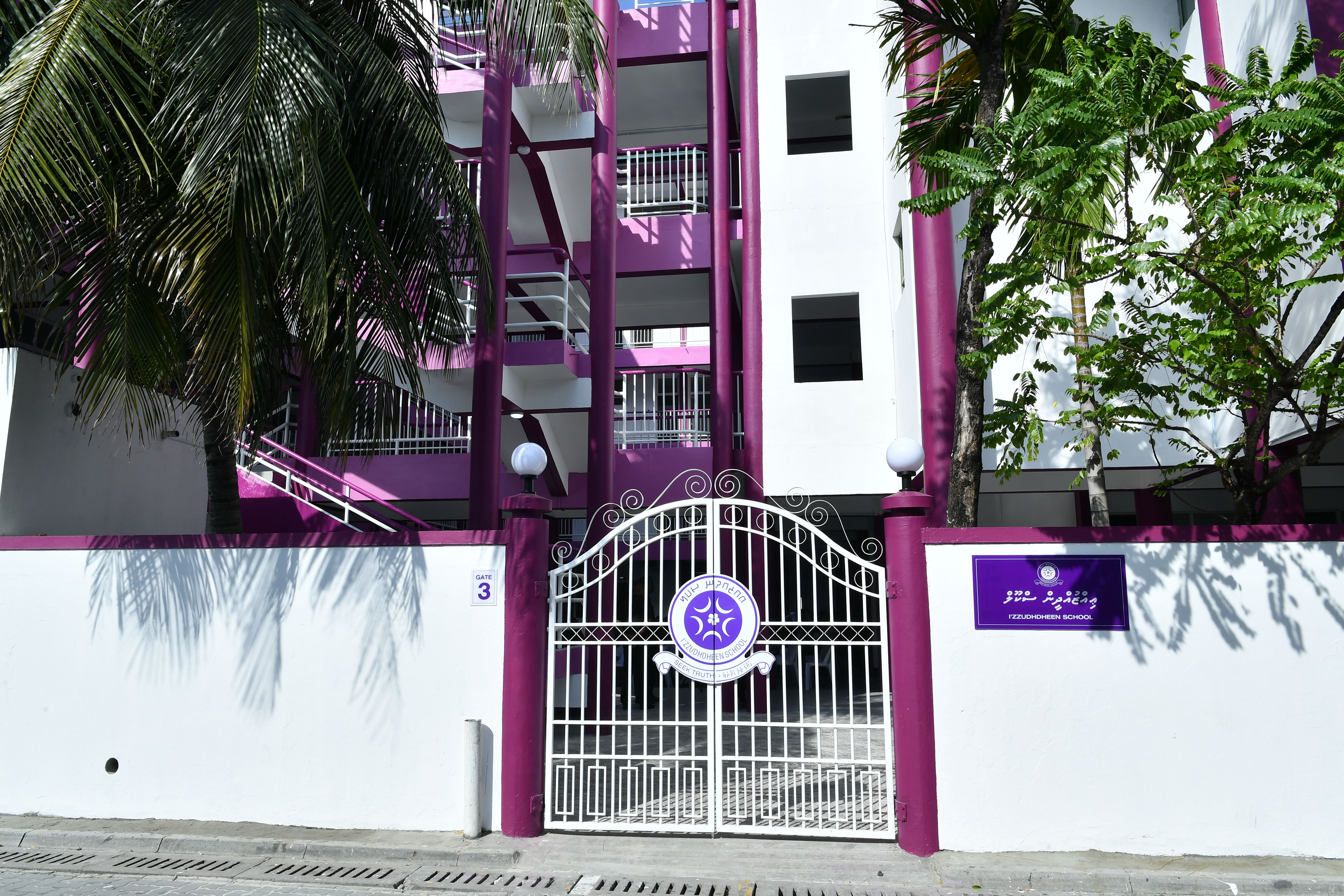
Front gate of Izzudheen School in 2020

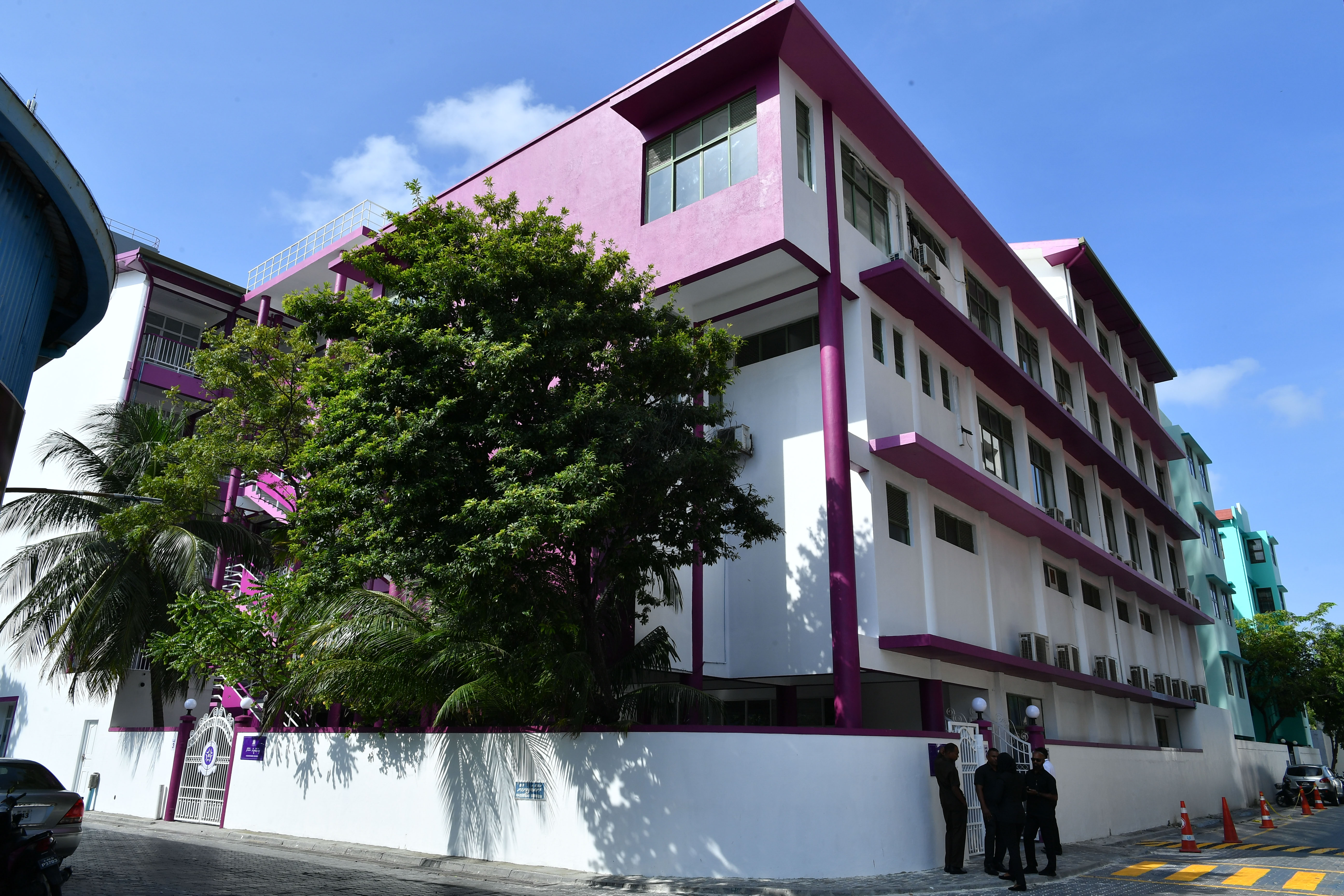
Building of Izzudheen School in 2020

The school was named after Sultan Al-Ghaazee Hassan Izzudheen Dhonbandaarain. It was opened in the building of the old Malé English School. It was the first school in the Maldives to have a lunch programme. It had a cap of 25 students per classroom, the first public school to have a limit. Temporarily, students of Arabiyya School were transferred to Izzudheen to study due to the cracks in the foundation of the building. But the parents refused and staged a protest with the campaign "Save Arabiyya."

=== Previous Principals and Deputy Principals ===
- Ismail Naseer (1 January 2021 - 3 July 2021)
- Fathimath Suza (4 July 2021 - 23 September 2021 (Note: Formerly a Deputy Principal at Iskandhar School)
- Nazira Hassan (24 September 2021 - 31 December 2021)

== Sexual harassment ==
The then principal of Izzudheen, Ismail Naseer, was accused of sexually harassing teachers at the school. This led to an investigation, which found him guilty. The Teachers' Association of Maldives (TAM) asked the Education Ministry to take action against the principal, in response the Ministry reassigned the principal to a different school. After leading teachers resigned en masse, they were reassigned to different schools. After being reassigned, the teachers were threatened in different ways. Some were threatened, while others were bullied.

== Closure ==
On 7 June 2024, it was revealed that the school had a giant crack in the building and the Ministry of Education had announced that a safety assessment was going to happen. The Ministry had then temporarily shut down the school for repairs and has decided to change all students to Dharumavantha School. Parents were also given opportunities to change to other schools than Dharumavantha.

On 26 September 2024, after the First Term ended, Izzudheen School was closed and all the teachers and students were transferred to Dharumavantha School.
