= Arabiyya School =

Islamic Primary and Secondary school in Malé, Maldives

Coordinates: 4.17694°N 73.50944°E

Al Madhrasathul Arabiyyathul Islamiyya

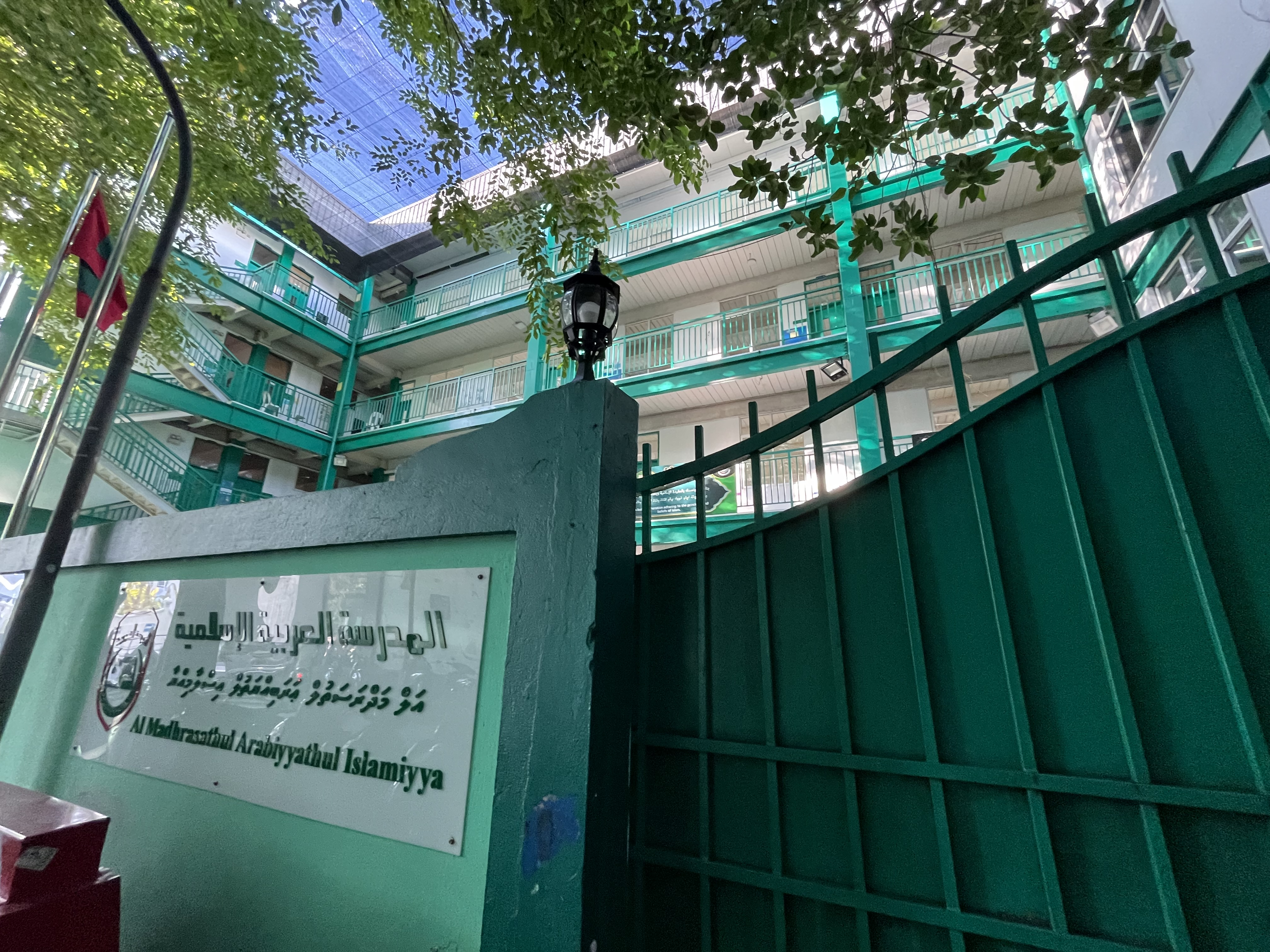

Address
- Medhuziyaaraiy Magu; Malé, Kaafu Atoll 20078; Maldives

Information
- Other name: Arabiyya School
- Type: Public
- Religious affiliation(s): Islam
- Established: 8 February 1987
- Founder: H. E President Maumoon Abdul Gayoom
- Principal: Mohamed Shujau
- Grades: 1-12
- Slogan: نبني أمتنا بالايمان والعلم والعمل
- Website: https://arabiyya.edu.mv

Al Madhrasathul Arabiyyathul Islamiyya (Arabic: المدرسة العربية الاسلامية, Dhivehi: އަލް މަދްރަސަތުލް ޢަރަބިއްޔަތުލް އަސްލާމިއްޔާ), more commonly known as Arabiyya School (Dhivehi: ޢަރަބިއްޔާ ސްކޫލް), is the first and only Arabic Islamic school in the Maldives, educating students from primary to upper secondary grades.

The current school song was introduced in 2016, with lyrics authored by poet Abdulla Afeef. Arabiyya School is the only school in the Maldives that gives assessments which are acceptable to Al-Azhar University.

== History ==
The school was inaugurated on 8 February 1987 by former president Maumoon Abdul Gayoom. The school has moved into several buildings since then. First, the school was moved to a new building in 2013, and then in 2021, it was moved to the old foreign ministry building after protests from not wanting to send their kids to Izzudheen School. Again, in 2023, the students were temporarily relocated to the old Dharumavantha School building for their studies due to cracks in the old building. After protests and the parents of students of Arabiyya talked to then-President Ibrahim Mohamed Solih, it was decided that the new school building will be in the old Jamaluddin School land but that was changed in 2024 to a landfill area by President Mohamed Muizzu. In 2024, amid a controversy regarding the school's Parent–teacher association (PTA), the Ministry of Education dissolved and a new committee was formed.

== Education ==
There are three steps or groups of grades. Ibthidhaaee is similar to primary and middle school and includes grades one to six. Iudhaadhee is similar to secondary school, starting at grade seven and ending at grade nine. The group of students in grades ten to twelve belong to Saanavee, which is similar to higher secondary school. In grade ten, students choose a stream of study. They can pursue the science stream (Ilmee) or the arts stream (Adhabee).
