= Aasandha =

Maldivian Government funded, single-payer health care system

Aasandha Company Ltd
- Trade name: Aasandha
- Native name: އާސަންދާ
- Founded: December 29, 2011; 14 years ago
- Headquarters: 3rd floor, Fen Building, Ameenee Magu, Machchangolhi, Malé, Maldives
- Key people: Aishath Zeeniya (Managing Director); Shaheed Mohamed (chairman); Ahmed Nazim (Deputy Managing Director)
- Services: Health insurance

Aasandha Company Ltd (Dhivehi: އާސަންދާ ޗޮމްޕަނީީ ލިމިޓެޑު), doing business as Aasandha (Dhivehi: އާސަންދާ) is the universal health insurance scheme of the Maldives. It is a single-payer healthcare system financed solely by the Government of Maldives. The Scheme is designed to provide medical care including hospitalization (in-patient and out-patient), cover costs of drugs, provide emergency evacuation to higher tier medical facilities and even covered medical care from abroad. The name "Aasandha" is used for referencing to the Scheme as well as the state owned company, Aasandha Company Limited, which acts as a third party claims administrator.

For the budget year 2020, Government is expected to spend over MVR 950.7 million for the scheme and represents 2.6% of the national expenditure budget.

== History ==
Aasandha was established on December 29, 2011, by act number 15/2011 (National Social Health Insurance Act). National Social Protection Agency operating under the Ministry of Health was charged with the program execution. Initially, the Government formed a limited liability company with Allied Insurance Company which was to act as a third party administrator facilitating and administering the program. Aasandha is operated on a cashless model where Aasandha Company paid to various service providers. Aasandha was implemented effective from January 1, 2012. Initially, it was designed with an overall limit of MVR 100,000 and had various sub-limits. This limit was abolished and the scheme was renamed on February 24, 2014, as Husnuvaa Aasandha by then president Abdulla Yameen.

== Features of Aasandha ==
Since the introduction of Husnuvaa Aasandha (lit: unlimited Aasandha), concept of overall limits and sub-limits which are often akin to that of private health insurance policies have been eliminated. Instead, all citizens of the Maldives are automatically entitled to and enrolled in the program and are guaranteed of medicare on their behalf. While Aasandha program ensures that no citizen has to pay out-of-pocket for medical services obtained from Government operated hospitals, the program does not provide 100% cover for cost incurred in private hospitals. A co-payment model is applied in case of private hospitals and clinics. Pharmacies are however, excluded from this co-payment model. The co-payment applied varies across various service providers and medical services. Medical service providers must register as a network partner and be approved by Aasandha Company Limited to finance healthcare from Aasandha Scheme.

Treatment from overseas hospitals are also allowed if the required treatment or care is not available in the Maldives. This options is solely managed by Aasandha Company Limited and choice of hospital in a foreign country is decided by the company. Currently, hospitals in India and Sri Lanka are empanelled for this.

Aasandha uses an exclusion model where all treatments except the named exclusions are covered.
