= Everest Spices =

Indian Food & products company

Everest Food Products Pvt Ltd
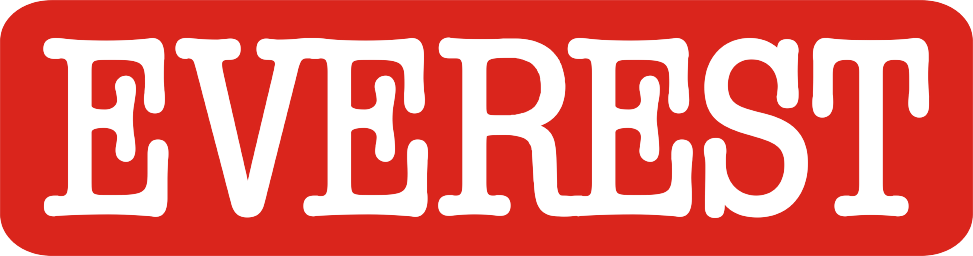
- Industry: Food
- Founded: 1967; 59 years ago
- Founder: Vadilal Shah
- Headquarters: Mumbai, Maharashtra, India
- Products: Spices
- Revenue: ▲₹2,601 crore (US$270 million) (2022)
- Website: everestfoods.com

Everest Food Products Pvt Ltd (Everest Spices) is an Indian manufacturer, distributor and exporter of ground spices and spice mixtures under the brand name Everest. The company is based in Mumbai.

In 2005, Everest had a 30% share of the branded spices market in India. It sells 42 blends under the Everest brand name.

Everest Spices competes with MDH, which has 12% market share.

== Controversies ==
In May 2024, New Zealand's food safety regulator said it was investigating contamination in spice products of Indian brands Everest and MDH. Its products were recalled by regulators in Hong Kong and Singapore for containing ethylene oxide.
