= MDH (spice company) =

Indian spice producer

Mahashian Di Hatti Private Limited
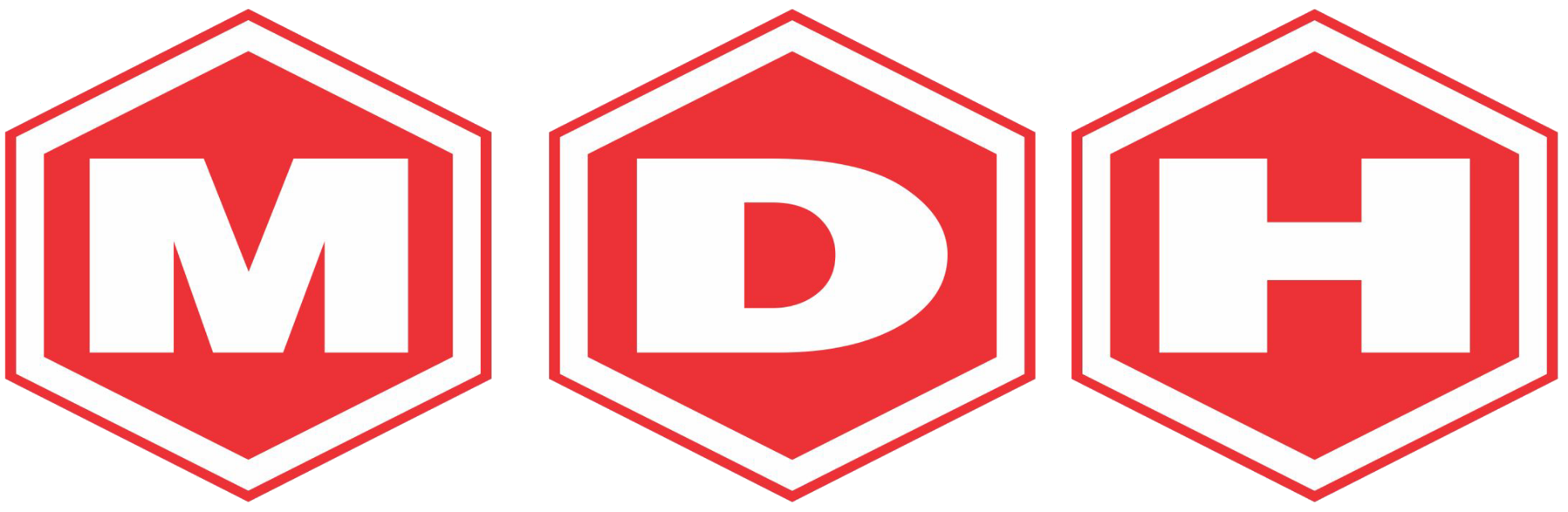
- Type: Private
- Industry: Food, spices
- Founded: 1919; 107 years ago, Sialkot, Punjab Province, British India
- Founder: Mahashay Chunnilal Gulati
- Headquarters: New Delhi, India
- Key people: Mahashay Dharampal Gulati; Rajeev Gulati (Managing Director); Jyoti Gulati (Director)
- Products: Deggi Mirch, Chana masala, Kitchen King, Chunky Chaat Masala, Meat Masala, Kasoori Methi, Garam masala, Rajmah masala, Shahi Paneer Masala, Dal Makhani Masala, Sabzi Masala.
- Revenue: ▲₹1,775 crore (US$180 million) (2022)
- Net income: ▲₹700 crore (US$73 million) (2022)
- Website: www.mdhspices.com

Mahashian Di Hatti Private Limited, doing business as MDH, is an Indian spice producer and seller based in New Delhi, India. It is the second largest leader in the Indian market with 12% market share, following S. Narendrakumar's Everest Spices.

It was founded by Dharampal Gulati in 1959, who served as its CEO until his death on 3 December 2020, Subsequently, Dharampal's son, Rajeev Gulati, took over the company and became the face of the MDH brand.

== History ==
Mahashay Chunnilal Gulati set up the masala company in 1919 in Sialkot, British India currently located in the Punjab province of Pakistan since 1947. It is associated with Mahashay Chunnilal Charitable Trust.

Mahashay Dharampal Gulati, the son of the founder moved to Delhi after the partition of India. He opened a shop in a shack and started selling spices like his father. He later opened his shop at Ajmal Khan Road, Karol Bagh and expanded from there. In 1959 he bought a plot in Kirti Nagar to set up his own spice factory.

At the age of 94, Dharampal Gulati was the highest paid fast-moving consumer goods (FMCG) CEO in India in 2017. He took home over ₹210 million (equivalent to ₹280 million or US$2.9 million in 2023) as salary in the last fiscal year. Two years later, on 16 March 2019, he received the Padma Bhushan award for Trade & Industry from the President of India Ram Nath Kovind.

== Operations ==
MDH has 62 products available in over 150 different packages. These include ground and blended spices, and saffron.

In 2022, the company denied rumours of it being sold to Unilever.

== Controversies ==
In May 2024, New Zealand's food safety regulator said it was investigating contamination in spice products of Indian brands MDH and Everest. Its products were recalled by regulators in Hong Kong and Singapore for containing ethylene oxide.
