= Health Protection Agency (Maldives) =

Government agency of the Maldives

- ހެލްތް ޕްރޮޓެކްޝަން އެޖެންސީ

Agency overview
- Formed: 12 January 2013
- Preceding agency: Centre for Community Health and Disease Control
- Jurisdiction: Government of the Maldives
- Headquarters: Malé
- Employees: 106 (as of 2023)
- Annual budget: MVR 6.65 million
- Parent department: Ministry of Health, Family and Welfare
- Website: hpa.gov.mv/en

The Health Protection Agency (Dhivehi: ހެލްތް ޕްރޮޓެކްޝަން އެޖެންސީ; HPA) is a government agency under the Ministry of Health, Family and Welfare of the Republic of Maldives. It is tasked with protecting public health of the people in the archipelago.

== History ==
After the abolition of the Centre for Community Health and Disease Control (CCHDC), the Health Protection Agency was formed on 12 January 2013 under Section 6 of the Public Health Act.

The HPA issues health advisories if any emergency situation arises within the country, along with steps on what to do if affected.
