= Oath =

Personal affirmation of a statement

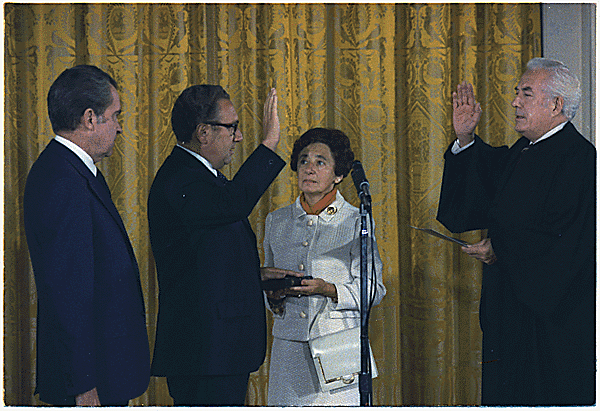
Henry Kissinger places his hand on a Hebrew Bible as he takes the oath of office as Secretary of State, 1973.

Traditionally, an oath (from Anglo-Saxon āþ, also a plight) is a statement of fact or a promise taken by a sacrality as a sign of verity. A common legal substitute for those who object to making sacred oaths is to give an affirmation instead. When there is no notion of sanctity involved, certain promises said out loud in ceremonial or juridical purpose are referred to as oaths. "To swear" is a verb used to describe the taking of an oath; to make a solemn vow.

== Etymology ==
The word comes from Anglo-Saxon āþ: "judicial swearing, solemn appeal to deity in witness of truth or a promise"; from Proto-Germanic *aiþaz; from Proto-Indo-European *oi-to-: "an oath". Common to Celtic and Germanic, possibly a loan-word from one to the other.

== Historical development as a legal concept ==
"Tennis Court Oath" by Jacques-Louis David

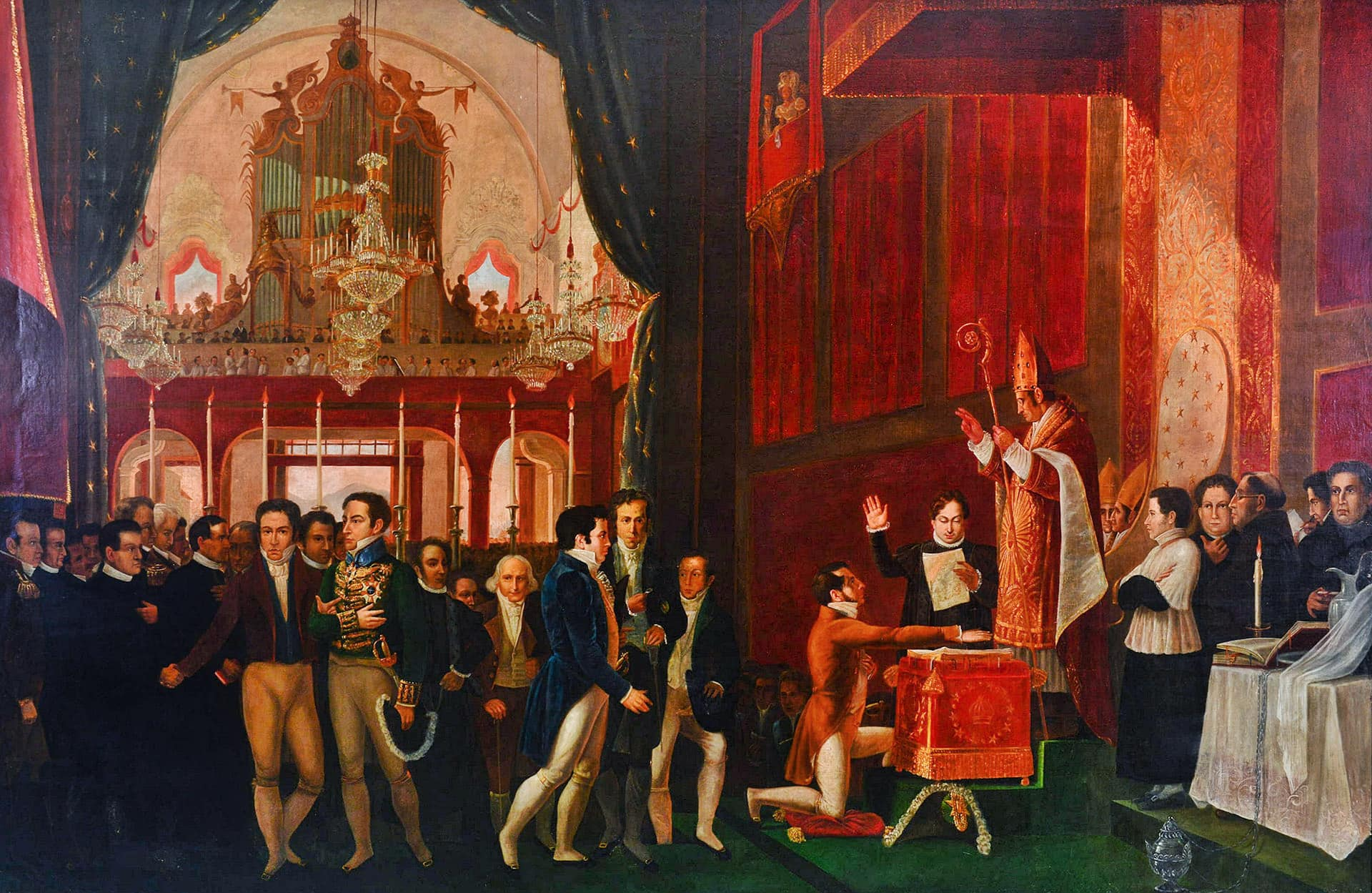
The oath of the provisional triumviral regents of the Empire of Brazil in the Imperial Chapel in 1831, during an era known as the Regency period

Isabel, Princess Imperial takes oath as regent of the Empire of Brazil before the Imperial Senate, c. 1870.

=== Jewish tradition ===
The concept of oaths is deeply rooted within Judaism. It is found in Genesis 8:21, when God swears that he will "never again curse the ground because of man and never again smite every living thing". This repetition of the term never again is explained by Rashi, the pre-eminent biblical commentator, as serving as an oath, citing the Talmud Shavous 36a for this ruling.

The first person stated in the biblical narrative to have taken an oath is held to be the chief servant of Abraham, when Abraham asked him to find a wife for his son Isaac, not from the women of Canaan, but rather from among Abraham's own family in Aram-naharaim (Nahor). The servant is often seen as Eliezer of Damascus, although the passage does not actually give his name. The servant effected his oath by placing his hand under Abraham's thigh, and the account stipulates that the servant will return to Nahor to find a wife for Isaac, but if the woman he selects declines to come back to Canaan with him, then the servant will be free from his oath.

The foundational text for oath making is in Numbers 30:2: "When a man voweth a vow unto the Lord, or sweareth an oath to bind his soul with a bond, he shall not break his word; he shall do according to all that proceedeth out of his mouth." According to the Rabbis, a neder (usually translated as "vow") refers to the object, a shâmar (usually translated as "oath") to the person. The passage distinguishes between a neder and a shvua, an important distinction between the two in Halakha: a neder changes the status of some external thing, while a shvua initiates an internal change in the one who swears the oath.

=== Roman tradition ===
In the Roman tradition, oaths were sworn upon Iuppiter Lapis or the Jupiter Stone located in the Temple of Jupiter, Capitoline Hill. Iuppiter Lapis was held in the Roman tradition to be an Oath Stone, an aspect of Jupiter in his role as divine law-maker responsible for order and used principally for the investiture of the oathtaking of office.

According to Cyril Bailey, in "The Religion of Ancient Rome" (1907):

We have, for instance, the sacred stone (silex) which was preserved in the temple of Iuppiter on the Capitol, and was brought out to play a prominent part in the ceremony of treaty-making. The fetial, who on that occasion represented the Roman people, at the solemn moment of the oath-taking, struck the sacrificial pig with the silex, saying as he did so, "Do thou, Diespiter, strike the Roman people as I strike this pig here to-day, and strike them the more, as thou art greater and stronger." Here no doubt the underlying notion is not merely symbolical, but in origin the stone is itself the god, an idea which later religion expressed in the cult-title specially used in this connection, Iuppiter Lapis.

The punisher of broken oaths was the infernal deity Orcus.

=== Hindu tradition ===
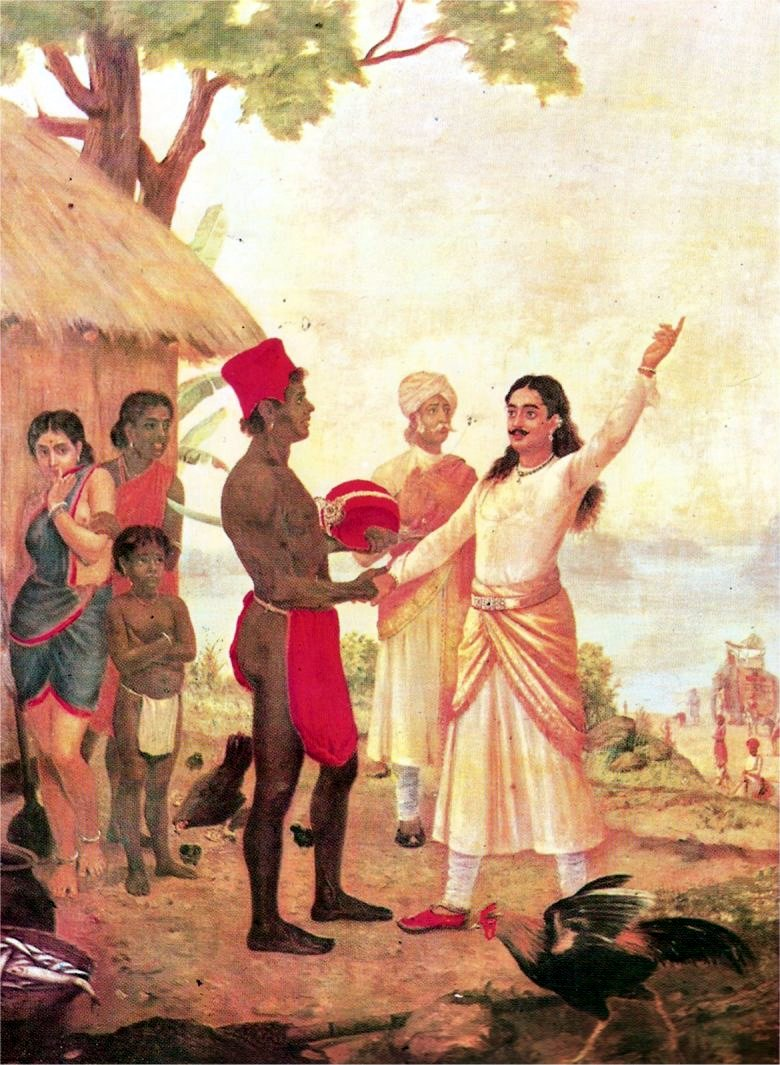
Devarata taking his bhishama pratigya

In Hindu epics, like the Ramayana and the Mahabharata, oaths, called pratigya, are taken seriously. It is mentioned that people would give up their lives, but not break a vow. Due to this, King Dasharatha took an oath for his Queen Kaikeyi (on her maid, Manthara's insistence) and thus had to exile his favorite son, Lord Rama along with his wife Devi Sita and brother Lakshmana for fourteen years in the forest.

In the Mahabharata, Devrata took an oath of celibacy so that Satyavati's father would marry her to Devrata's father, King Shantanu. He also took an oath to not rule the kingdom and remain loyal to the king, who would be a descendant of Satyavati. Thus, Devavrata got the name Bhishma, which means someone who has taken a terrible oath. Many others also took oaths that they fulfilled.

=== Greek tradition ===
Walter Burkert has shown that since Lycurgus of Athens (d. 324 BCE), who held that "it is the oath which holds democracy together", religion, morality and political organization had been linked by the oath, and the oath and its prerequisite altar had become the basis of both civil and criminal, as well as international law.

In traditional Greek folk songs, such as The Dead Brother's Song, the significance of the oath is highlighted. The power of an oath is such that it transcends death, as the deceased brother arises from the grave to fulfill his oath to his mother.

=== Christian tradition ===
Various Christian denominations have objected to the taking of oaths, most notably the Religious Society of Friends (Quakers) and Anabaptist groups, like Mennonites, Amish, Hutterites and Schwarzenau Brethren. This is principally based on Matthew 5:34–37, the Antithesis of the Law. Here, Christ is reported as having said: "I say to you: 'Swear not at all'". James the Just stated in 5:12 "Above all, my brothers, do not swear—not by heaven or by earth or by anything else. Let your 'Yes' be yes, and your 'No', no, or you will be condemned." Beyond this scriptural authority, Quakers place importance on being truthful at all times, so the testimony opposing oaths springs from a view that "taking legal oaths implies a double standard of truthfulness" suggesting that truthfulness in legal contexts is somehow more important than truthfulness in non-legal contexts and that truthfulness in those other contexts is therefore somehow less important.

Not all Christians interpret this reading as forbidding all types of oaths, however. Opposition to oath-taking among some groups of Christian caused many problems for these groups throughout their history. Quakers were frequently imprisoned because of their refusal to swear loyalty oaths. Testifying in court was also difficult; George Fox, Quakers' founder, famously challenged a judge who had asked him to swear, saying that he would do so once the judge could point to any Bible passage where Jesus or his apostles took oaths — the judge could not, but this did not allow Fox to escape punishment. Legal reforms from the 18th century onwards mean that everyone in the United Kingdom now has the right to make a solemn affirmation instead of an oath. The United States has permitted affirmations since it was founded; it is explicitly mentioned in the Constitution. Only President Franklin Pierce has chosen to affirm rather than swear at his inauguration.

As late as 1880, Charles Bradlaugh was denied a seat as an MP in the Parliament of the United Kingdom because of his professed atheism as he was judged unable to swear the Oath of Allegiance in spite of his proposal to swear the oath as a "matter of form".

=== Islamic tradition ===
Islam takes the fulfillment of oaths extremely seriously, as directed by the Qur'an:

God does not hold you responsible for the mere utterance of oaths; He holds you responsible for your actual intentions. If you violate an oath, you shall atone by feeding ten poor people from the same food you offer to your own family, or clothing them, or by freeing a slave. If you cannot afford this, then you shall fast three days. This is the atonement for violating the oaths that you swore to keep. You shall fulfill your oaths. God thus explains His revelations to you, that you may be appreciative.

— Quran Chapter 5: Verse 89

=== Germanic tradition ===
Germanic warrior culture was significantly based on oaths of fealty.

A prose passage inserted in the eddic poem Helgakviða Hjörvarðssonar relates: Hedin was coming home alone from the forest one Yule-eve, and found a troll-woman; she rode on a wolf, and had snakes in place of a bridle. She asked Hedin for his company. "Nay," said he. She said, "Thou shalt pay for this at the bragarfull." That evening the great vows were taken; the sacred boar was brought in, the men laid their hands thereon, and took their vows at the bragarfull. Hedin vowed that he would have Sváva, Eylimi's daughter, the beloved of his brother Helgi; then such great grief seized him that he went forth on wild paths southward over the land, and found Helgi, his brother.

Such Norse traditions are directly parallel to the "bird oaths" of late medieval France, such as the voeux du faisan (oath on the pheasant) or the (fictional) voeux du paon (oath on the peacock).

=== Modern law ===
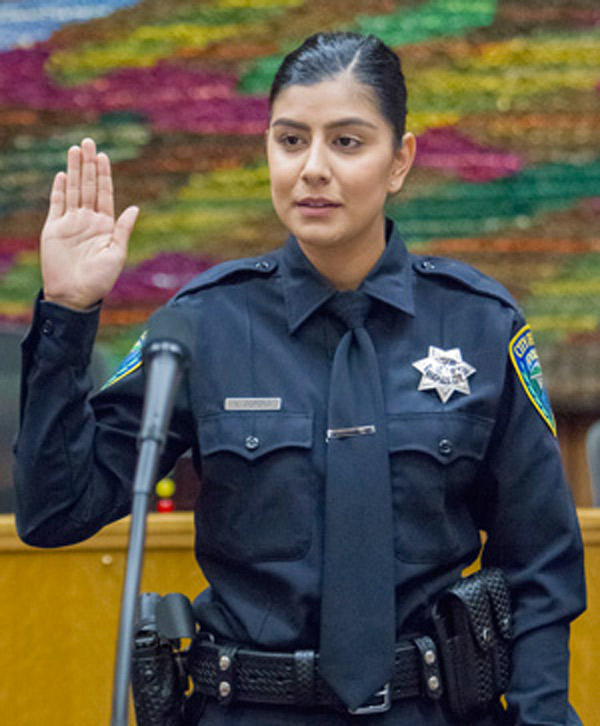
A new police officer in the US being sworn in, 2018

In the modern law, oaths are made by a witness to a court of law before giving testimony and usually by a newly appointed government officer to the people of a state before taking office. However, in both of those cases, an affirmation can usually be replaced with a written statement, only if the author swears the statement is true. This statement is called an affidavit. This is in contrast to a statutory declaration, where no sworn oath or affirmation is involved. The oath given to support an affidavit is frequently administered by a notary, who will certify the giving of the oath by affixing her or his seal to the document. Willfully delivering a false oath (or affirmation) is the crime of perjury.

There are some places where there is a confusion between the "oath" and other statements or promises. For example, the current Olympic Oath is really a pledge, not properly an oath, since there is only a promise but there is no appeal to a sacred witness. Oaths may also be confused with vows, but vows are really just a particular kind of an oath.

== Hand gestures ==
"Hand on oath" used as a charge on the coat of arms of Anjala, Finland

Instead of, or in addition to, holding one's hand upon an object of ceremonial importance, it can be customary for a person swearing an oath to hold a raised hand in a specific gesture. Most often the right hand is raised. This custom has been explained with reference to medieval practices of branding palms.

=== International customs ===
The Scout Sign can be made while giving the Scout Promise. In Scouting for Boys the movement's founder, Robert Baden-Powell, instructed: "While taking this oath the scout will stand, holding his right hand raised level with his shoulder, palm to the front, thumb resting on the nail of the digitus minimus (little finger) and the other three fingers upright, pointing upwards."

== Types of oaths ==
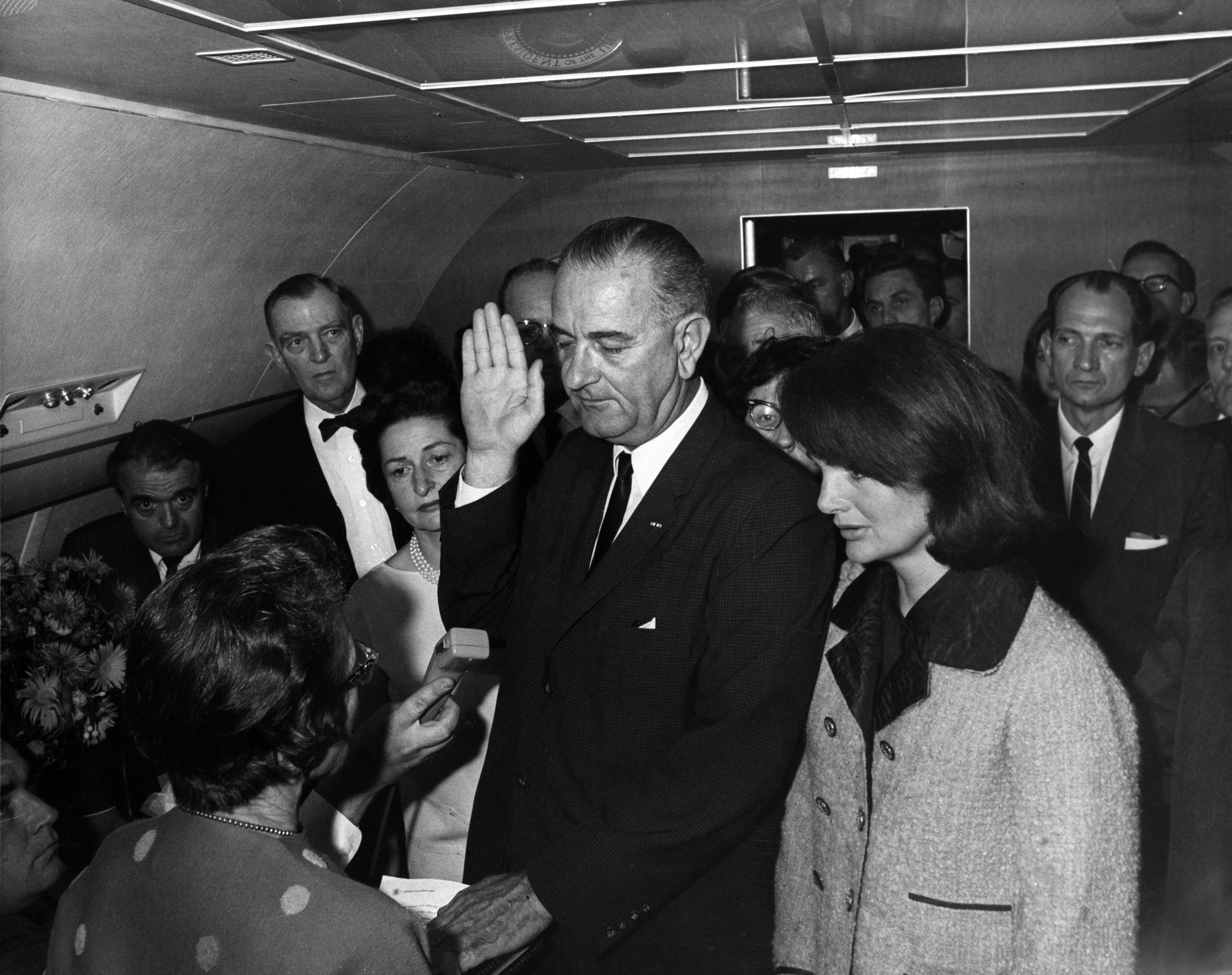
Shortly after US president John F. Kennedy was shot, Lyndon Johnson was sworn in as the new president on board Air Force One.

- Hippocratic Oath, an oath historically taken by physicians and other healthcare professionals swearing to practice medicine honestly.
  - Veterinarian's Oath, an oath taken by veterinarians as practitioners of veterinary medicine in a manner similar to the Hippocratic Oath.
- Oath of allegiance, an oath whereby a subject or citizen acknowledges a duty of allegiance and swears loyalty to monarch or country.
- Oath of citizenship, an oath taken by immigrants that officially naturalizes immigrants into citizens.
- Oath of office, an oath or affirmation a person takes before undertaking the duties of an office.
  - Juror's oath, an oath taken by jurors at the beginning of jury selection or trial
- Pauper's oath, a sworn statement or oath by a person that he or she is completely without any money or property.
- Military oath, delivered on enlistment into the military service of the state military.
- Decisory oath, an oath that conclusively resolves a factual dispute

== Notable oaths in history and fiction ==
- The oath of Bhishma in Hindu culture.
- Hittite military oath, a Hittite text on two cuneiform tablets.
- Ironclad Oath, promoted by Radical Republicans and opposed by President Abraham Lincoln during the American Civil War.
- Lwów Oath, by Polish king John II Casimir.
- Oath Against Modernism, required of clergy and others in the Catholic Church from 1910 until 1967.
- Oaths in Freemasonry.
- Oath More Judaico or Jewish Oath, rooted in antisemitism and accompanied by certain ceremonies.
- Oaths of Strasbourg, a military pact made in 842.
- Hitler Oath, sworn by German soldiers of the Wehrmacht and the German civil service, pledging allegiance to Adolf Hitler personally.
- Omertà, a Southern Italian code of silence and code of honor and conduct.
- Scout Oath or Scout Promise.
- Tennis Court Oath, taken on 20 June 1789 by members of the French Third Estate.
- Oath of Fëanor, in the fiction of J. R. R. Tolkien.
- Oath of the Peach Garden, a fictional event in the 14th century Chinese historical novel Romance of the Three Kingdoms by Luo Guanzhong.
- The Baljuna Covenant, an oath sworn by Genghis Khan and a small group of companions

== See also ==
- ACLU of N.C. & Syidah Matteen v. State of North Carolina, a court case in a state of the United States about taking oaths by different scriptures. The results have reversed several times.
- Australasian Police Multicultural Advisory Bureau has several publications for Australia dealing with multi-faith issues and A Practical Reference to Religious Diversity for Operational Police and Emergency Services covers oaths as well as many other topics. (In review as of 12/2/2006 but the 2nd Edition is available.)
- Confirmation
- Ephebic Oath
- Performativity
- So help me God
- Statutory declaration
- Sworn declaration
- Vow
