= List of Teachers' Days =

Day for appreciating teachers

Teachers' Day is a special day for the appreciation of teachers. It may include celebrations to honor them for their special contributions in a particular field area, or the community tone in education. This is one of the most celebrated days and the primary reason why countries celebrate this day on different dates, unlike many other International Days. For example, Argentina has commemorated Domingo Faustino Sarmiento's death on 11 September as Teachers' Day since 1915. In India, the birthday of the second president Sarvepalli Radhakrishnan, 5 September, is celebrated as Teachers' Day since 1962.

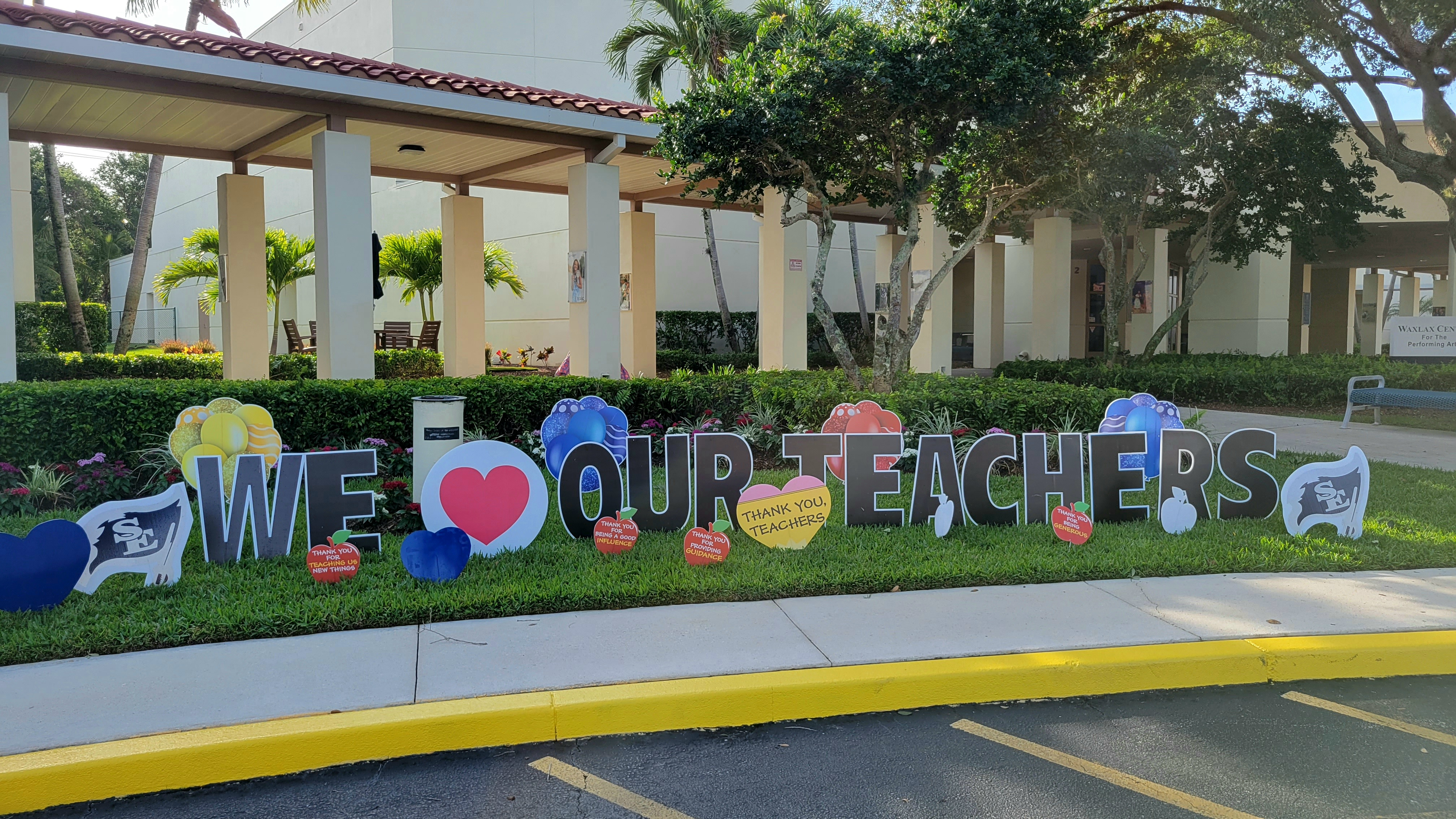
Teacher Appreciation Week decoration at a school in Florida.

Many countries celebrate their Teachers' Day on 5 October in conjunction with World Teachers' Day, which was established by UNESCO in 1994.

== Dates by country/region ==
Country/region	Teachers' Day	Notes
Afghanistan	14 Mezan October 5 (3 Ordibehesht)	Schools do not have a holiday, but students and teachers gather to celebrate at schools with special traditional food, cookies, music, and presents for the teachers.
Albania	7 March	Celebrates the opening of the first school where lessons were taught in the Albanian language, on 7 March 1887.
Algeria	28 February	
Argentina	11 September	In memory of Domingo F. Sarmiento (15 February 1811 – 11 September 1888), the second president of Argentina. Sarmiento made primary education compulsory, established 800 educational and military institutions including teachers' schools, founded public libraries, developed infrastructure, and fostered immigration. Inspired by Horace Mann, whom he befriended, he brought 32 American teachers to Argentina to develop the American model of universal education. The 1943 Interamerican Conference on Education, held in Panama, established September 11 as Panamerican Teacher's Day.
Armenia	5 October	Armenia previously celebrated Teacher's Day on the first Sunday of October. Under a parliamentary decision to amend the law on the Republic of Armenia Holidays and Commemoration Days, the holiday was shifted to 5 October, which coincides with World Teachers' Day.
Australia	Last Friday in October	On Australia's celebration of Teachers' Day, the NEiTA Foundation and the Australian Scholarships Group (ASG) announce the national teaching recipients of the ASG Community Merit Awards. If the last Friday of the month falls on 31 October, coinciding with Halloween, the celebration is postponed to 7 November.
Azerbaijan	5 October	Between 1965 and 1994, it was celebrated on the first Sunday of October. Since 1994, it has coincided with World Teachers' Day on 5 October.
Bahrain	5 October	
Bangladesh	5 October	Additionally, 15 January is celebrated as a special day to honour the contributions of educators, in memory of Dr. Kazi Motaher Hossain, a prominent figure in the country's education system. On these days, schools often organise events to express appreciation for teachers, with activities like speeches, cultural performances, and student-teacher interactions.
Belarus	First Sunday of October	
Belgium	5 October	
Bhutan	2 May	Teachers' Day in Bhutan was first observed on 2 May 2003 to mark the birth anniversary of the third King of Bhutan, Jigme Dorji Wangchuck, who introduced modern education in the country.
Bolivia	6 June	The date is an homage to the birth date of Modesto Omiste (June 6, 1840) who was concerned about the education system in Bolivia, advocating the right to free public primary education. As councilman, he created the first public schools in the country, one for boys and one for girls.
Brazil	15 October	Commemorating Emperor of Brazil Pedro I's decree of 15 October 1827 that regulated elementary schools in Brazil. The celebration gained popularity throughout the country, and October 15 was officially designated Teachers' Day in 1963.
Brunei	23 September	Commemorating the birth date of the 28th ruler of Brunei, Sultan Omar Ali Saifuddien III, who amongst other things emphasized the importance of education to his subjects by introducing a policy of 'free' education whereby the citizens are charged very nominal fees for attending schools. This policy has been continued and extended by the current (29th) ruler.
Bulgaria	24 May	Bulgarians celebrate Teachers Day on May 24, in commemoration of Saints Cyril and Methodius, who are credited with devising the Glagolitic alphabet. Additionally, November 1 is a Bulgarian holiday dedicated to educators and scholars who have built and preserved the spiritual values and cultural identity of Bulgaria. On 29 September 2006, the date of October 5 was recognized as Teacher's Day by the government.
Cameroon	5 October	On 5 October 2010, teachers in Cameroon joined their peers worldwide to celebrate the 17th World Teachers Day. With the theme "Nation building passes through teachers", the day served as an opportunity to pay homage to teachers who toil, sometimes under not-so-comfortable conditions, to build the capacities of human resources for the socio-economic development of the country. Commemorative activities in Yaounde began on 29 September with educative talks at the Lycée Général Leclerc, and were rounded off on World Teachers Day at the Wada multi-purpose sports complex.
Canada	5 October	On October 5, the Canadian Teachers' Federation and its member organizations across the country celebrate World Teachers' Day through a public awareness campaign that highlights the contributions of the teaching profession.
Chile	16 October	In 1967, September 11 was selected as Día del Maestro ('Teacher's Day'). The date was moved to December 10 in 1975, because on that day in 1945, the Chilean poet Gabriela Mistral received the Nobel Prize. In 1977, the date was renamed to Día del Profesor (also 'Teacher's Day') and was moved again, to October 16, to honour the founding of the Colegio de Profesores de Chile (Teachers' Association of Chile).
China	10 September	The Chinese government first proclaimed Teachers' Day in 1985, but has never clearly explained why it should fall on 10 September. Some believe it is due to the similar pronunciation between the word "teacher" (教师; jiao shi) and the two digits 9 (九; jiu), 10 (十; shi) in the date. Some people believe it was an arbitrary choice and have proposed to change it to 28 September, believed to be the birthdate of Confucius. On 5 September 2013, the State Council announced a legislative draft endorsing the change. In China, there are some activities for students to show their appreciation to teachers, such as presenting gifts, including cards and flowers. In addition, many former students will go back to their old primary schools, middle schools and high schools to give presents to their old teachers.
Colombia	15 May	This day marks the appointment of San Juan Bautista de la Salle as the patron of teachers. In 1950, Pope Pius XII granted his approval of La Salle as patron of teachers for championing the causes of modern education. The holy founder understood the education of children as the obligation of all. Usually the schools of his time (1651–1719) only accepted young people studying towards politics or diplomacy. Juan Bautista outlined the principles of free and universal education. That same year in Colombia, the President of the Republic declared that date as Teachers' Day.
Costa Rica	22 November	To commemorate the birth date of Mauro Fernández Acuña (22 December 1843), a reformer of Costa Rican education.
Croatia	5 October	
Cuba	22 December	On 22 December 1961, Cuba declared itself a Territory Free of Illiteracy (Territorio Libre de Analfabetismo) (see Cuban Literacy Campaign).
Czech Republic	28 March	The birthday of John Amos Comenius. Czech students nominate their most motivative and inspiring teachers to the Zlatý Ámos (Golden Amos) competition. The coronation of "Golden Amos" takes place yearly on 28 March.
Dominican Republic	30 June	
Ecuador	13 April	
Egypt	28 February	
El Salvador	22 June	Teachers' Day in El Salvador is observed as a national holiday.
Estonia	5 October	In Estonia last class students grant leave to teachers by conducting lessons themselves.
France	27 November	Commemorating the feast of Saint Joseph Calasanz, founder of the Order of Poor Clerics Regular of the Mother of God of the Pious Schools
Georgia	5 October	Between 1965 and 1994, the day was celebrated on first Sunday of October. Since 1994, it has coincided with World Teachers' Day on 5 October.
Germany	5 October	
Greece	30 January	Derived from the Eastern Orthodox faith when the Three Holy Hierarchs and Ecumenical Teachers (Basil the Great, Gregory the Theologian and John Chrysostom) are commemorated.
Guatemala	25 June	A celebration in honour of the teacher María Chinchilla who died during a violent riot in protest against the government.
Honduras	17 September	Celebration in honour of the life of José Trinidad Reyes
Hong Kong	10 September	Before the transfer of sovereignty over Hong Kong in 1997, Teachers' Day was on 28 September. After the handover to the People's Republic of China, the day was changed to 10 September, which is when the PRC celebrates the holiday.
Hungary	First Sunday of June	
India	5 September and Full moon day of Ashadha (June–July)	1. The birth date of the second President of India, Sarvepalli Radhakrishnan, 5 September 1888, has been celebrated as Teacher's Day since 1962. On this day, the usual school activities are replaced by celebration, thanks and remembrance. In some schools, senior students take the responsibility of teaching in order to show their appreciation for the teachers.; 2. Guru Purnima is an Indian and Nepalese festival dedicated to spiritual and academic teachers. This festival is traditionally celebrated by Hindus, Jains and Buddhists. The celebration is marked by ritualistic respect to the Guru, Guru Puja.
Indonesia	25 November	National Teachers' Day is commemorated on the same day as the formation of the Indonesian Teachers' Association, the PGRI. National Teachers' Day is not a holiday, but it is celebrated by having a ceremonial activity in recognition of certain teachers, headmasters and other school staff.
Iran	2 May (12 Ordibehesht)	In memory of Abo-al-Hasan Khan-Ali before the Iranian revolution and after that reassigned the same day in memory of Morteza Motahhari (31 January 1919 – 2 May 1979). On this day schools won't have a holiday, but students and teachers gather to celebrate at schools with presents for the teachers.
Iraq	1 March	Students celebrate National Teacher's Day in Iraq by showing their appreciation for their teachers by giving gifts to them.
Israel	23 Kislev	
Italy	27 November	Commemorating the feast of Saint Joseph Calasanz, founder of the Order of Poor Clerics Regular of the Mother of God of the Pious Schools
Jamaica	6 May	Teachers' Day is normally celebrated on the Wednesday of the first full week in May. In celebration of Teachers' Day, it is common for students and parents to bring teachers gifts. Most schools close early.
Japan	5 October	
Jordan	5 October	
Kazakhstan	First Sunday of October	
Kosovo	7 March	
Kuwait	5 October	
Kyrgyz Republic	5 October	
Laos	7 October	
Latvia	5 October	
Lebanon	9 March	Teachers are usually given gifts by students to show appreciation of teaching them.
Libya	28 February	
Lithuania	5 October	Between 1965 and 1994, it was celebrated on the first Sunday of October. Since 1994, it has been celebrated on 5 October to coincide with the World Teachers' Day. Classes are mostly shortened or cancelled, while students or workers run classes about career and so on. Teachers are mostly greeted with flowers.
Malaysia	16 May	On this day in 1956, the Federal Legislative Council of the Federation of Malaya endorsed the Razak Report, one of four reports of the Education Committee regarding education in Malaysia. The Razak Report, named after Tun Abdul Razak who was Education Minister at the time, has been the basis of education in Malaysia ever since. Although it is not an official school holiday, celebrations are usually held on 16 May, or earlier if it falls on a Saturday or Sunday.
Maldives	5 October	On 5 October, schools in the Maldives celebrate Teachers' Day with many activities. Children and students give parcels and gifts to teachers.
Mauritius	5 October	
Mexico	15 May	On May 15 (known as "Día del Maestro") schools in Mexico are supposed to stop normal activities and organize cultural events that promote the importance and dignity of the teachers' role in society. In reality some schools operate as usual and others take the day off. The first Teacher's Day was celebrated on May 15, 1918. The date of May 15 was proposed at the Mexican Congress on September 27, 1917, approved on October 29, 1917, and published on December 5, 1917. There are several possible origins for choosing this date. The first one mentions that in the city of San Luis Potosí every May 15, a group of students gathered to celebrate the birthday of their old teacher Isidore, named after Saint Isidore the Laborer, following the Mexican tradition of naming children according to the Saint celebrated the day they were born. The second origin considers the celebration of a historic event in the city of Querétaro on May 15, 1867.
Moldova	5 October	Between 1965 and 1994, the day was celebrated on the first Sunday of October. Since 1994, it takes place on 5 October, coinciding with World Teachers' Day. Before this, at schools across the country, Teachers' Day was (and sometimes still is) celebrated the first Friday with concerts and gatherings. At some schools exists tradition with organising pupils of senior classes to conduct lesson for minors.
Mongolia	5 October	
Morocco	28 February	
Myanmar	5 October	
Nepal	Full moon day of Ashadha (June–July)	The full moon day is also called Ashad sukla purnima; the date usually falls in mid-July. Teacher's Day is called "Guru Purnima" in Nepali, where "Guru" means teacher and "Purnima" means "Full Moon".
Netherlands	5 October	
New Zealand	29 October	
Nigeria	5 October	Teachers' day in Nigeria is usually a work-free day for all rural and urban teachers.
North Macedonia	5 October	
Oman	24 February	
Palestine	14 December	
Panama	1 December	To commemorate the birth date of Manuel José Hurtado, who is known as the father of Panamanian education because of his promotion of modern universal education through the establishment of the first public schools and teachers' colleges in what is now known as Panama — then part of Colombia – aiming to break the vicious cycle of ignorance and poverty that afflicted the vast majority of the population. He went on to be named Director-General of Public Instruction of the State of the Isthmus.
Pakistan	5 October	Students of schools, colleges and universities present gratitude to their teachers by presenting them hand-written cards and flowers.
Papua New Guinea	5 October	Papua New Guinea celebrates both National Teachers' Day and World Teachers' Day on this same day. Each school under the National Department of Education (NDOE) and higher institutions of learning and universities under the Department of Higher Education, Research, Science and Technology (DHERST) celebrates the occasion by staging programs and activities dedicated to the teachers. Children and adults are actively involved in acknowledging the teachers contribution to their well-being and intellectual development and growth.
Paraguay	30 April	
Peru	6 July	During the independence of Peru, the Liberator José de San Martín founded the first Normal School for Men by means of a resolution passed by the Marquis of Torre-Tagle on 6 July 1822. Many years later, in 1953, the then president Manuel A. Odría decided that Teachers' Day would be commemorated every 6 July.
Philippines	16 October	By virtue of Presidential Proclamation No. 242, s. 2011, National Teacher's Month is celebrated from September 6 through October 16, on World Teachers' Day. Before 2011, Teachers' Day was celebrated in schools between the months of September and October (mainly elementary and secondary levels). Teachers are presented with orchid corsages by students. Groups of students representing various grade levels perform short skits or song and dance numbers, or read poetry for their teachers in front of fellow schoolmates in school-wide activities. These activities are planned by senior students in the Student Council who coordinate the activities well in advance. For French Filipino schools, a program is usually organized by students for teachers on 27 September while 28 September, considered as the actual Teachers' Day, is a school holiday where both teachers and students are allowed to rest. 28 September was selected as it is thought to be the birthdate of Confucius.
Poland	14 October	This day is the anniversary of the creation of the Commission of National Education, created in 1773 through the initiative of King Stanisław August Poniatowski. Normally, flowers and sweets will be given to teachers by kids. School play and activities can be also scheduled by student body.
Portugal	5 October	
Puerto Rico	20 May	In 2016, it was celebrated on 20 May. Usually, it is the Friday before Mother's Day. In some cases, it has been celebrated on the first Friday of May.
Qatar	5 October	
Romania	5 October	
Russia	5 October	Between 1965 and 1994, the first Sunday of October, since 1994, 5 October, coinciding with World Teachers' Day. Before this, at schools across the country, Teachers' Day was (and sometimes still is) celebrated the first Friday with concerts and gatherings. At some schools exists tradition with organising pupils of senior classes to conduct lesson for minors.
Saudi Arabia	5 October	
Serbia	5 October	
Singapore	First Friday of September	An official school holiday. Celebrations are normally conducted the day before, where students usually get half a day off. In Secondary schools and Junior Colleges, students are allowed to go back to their Primary and Secondary school respectively. In some schools, students will put on performances to entertain and honour their teachers. Traditionally, Teacher's Day was designated on September 1 of every year. From 2011, it has been designated on the first Friday of September, to coincide with the upcoming September school holidays (one week) so that students and teachers can enjoy an extended school holidays. In 2023, the Ministry of Education announced on 11 August that Teacher's Day had been rescheduled from 1 September to 11 September due to the 2023 Singapore Presidential Election Polling Day, which was designated to be a public holiday.
Slovakia	28 March	Commemorates the birthdate of John Amos Comenius.
Somalia	21 November	Since 1974, Teachers' Day has been a public holiday celebrated in every school.
South Africa	5 October	
South Korea	15 May	Originally it was started by a group of Red Cross youth team members who visited their sick ex-teachers in hospitals. Originally its date was 26 May. But since 1965, its date has been 15 May, Sejong the Great's birthday. The national celebration ceremony was stopped between 1973 and 1982, but it resumed after that. In 1982, it was revived again to create a climate that honors its mentor. On the day, teachers are usually presented with carnations by their students and ex-students. It is illegal to present carnations to public school teachers under the anti-graft law.
South Sudan	1 December	The president of South Sudan proclaimed Teacher's Day for 1 December, one month before the country's first Teacher's Day. On 1 September, one month before the country's third Teacher's Day, it was publicly announced that they changed the date to 1 October.
Spain	27 November	Commemorating the feast of Saint Joseph Calasanz, founder of the Order of Poor Clerics Regular of the Mother of God of the Pious Schools
Sri Lanka	5 October	Officially Teachers' Day is celebrated in most of the schools on 6 October.
Switzerland	27 November	Commemorating the feast of Saint Joseph Calasanz, founder of the Order of Poor Clerics Regular of the Mother of God of the Pious Schools
Taiwan	28 September	The Republic of China on Taiwan uses this day to honor teachers' contributions to their own students and to society in general. People often make use of the day to express their gratitude to their teachers, such as paying them a visit or sending them a card. This date was chosen to commemorate the birth of Confucius, believed to be the model master educator. In 1939, the Ministry of Education established the national holiday as 27 August, the attributed birthday of Confucius. In 1952, the Executive Yuan changed it to September, stating that it was calculated to be the precise date in the Gregorian calendar. The festival celebration occurs in the temples of Confucius around the island, known as the "Grand Ceremony Dedicated to Confucius" (祭孔大典). The ceremony begins at 6am with drum beats. 54 musicians are dressed in robes with blue belts, and 36 (or 64) dancers dressed in yellow with green belts. They are led by Confucius' chief descendant (currently Kung Tsui-chang) and followed by ceremonial officers. Three animals are sacrificed: a cow, a goat, and a pig. The hairs plucked from these sacrificed animals are called the Hairs of Wisdom. In addition, local education institutes and civil offices award certain teachers for their excellence and positive influence.
Thailand	16 January	Adopted as Teachers' Day, in spoken Thai language "Wan Kru", by a resolution of the government on 21 November 1956. The first Teachers' Day was held in 1957. 16 January marks the enactment of the Teachers Act, Buddhist Era 2488 (1945), which was published in the Government Gazette on 16 January 1945, and came into force 60 days later. Most Thai schools close for the day to give their teachers a break during the long second term. Many international schools do not, although they may hold celebrations to honour their teaching staff. The celebrations usually include giving small jasmine floral wreaths to their teachers and doing performances for teachers. This is an important holiday for Thais as teachers are held in high regard in Thailand. Most celebrations are at the schools and there are very few public or official commemorations.
Tunisia	28 February	
Turkey	24 November	Mustafa Kemal Atatürk stated that "The new generation will be created by teachers" and as founding President adopted a new alphabet for the newly founded Turkish Republic in 1923. On 24 November 1928, Mustafa Kemal officially accepted the title of head teacher of the nation's schools, granted by the cabinet of ministers.
Ukraine	First Sunday of October	At schools across the country, Teachers' Day is celebrated the Friday before the holiday with concerts and gatherings, while students usually give their teachers gifts such as flowers and sweets. At some schools exists tradition with organising pupils of senior classes to conduct lesson for minors. The ceremony of issuing the appreciation certificates may be conducted for notable teachers.
United Arab Emirates	5 October	
United Kingdom	19 June	National Thank a Teacher Day is an annual call-to-action to reach out to those who shape our schools, communities and country. It is all about appreciating the hard work of every single member of staff in early years, schools and colleges across the UK. Everyone in the UK is encouraged to recognise the impact that the education community has in shaping the minds and futures of our young people on National Thank a Teacher Day.
United States of America	Tuesday of the first full week of May	National Teacher Day in the US takes place on the Tuesday of Teacher Appreciation Week, which takes place in the first full week of May. The National Education Association (NEA) describes National Teacher Day as "a day for honoring teachers and recognizing the lasting contributions they make to our lives". According to the NEA's history of National Teacher Day, the origins of the day are murky. Around 1944, a Wisconsin teacher named Ryan Krug began corresponding with political and education leaders about the need for a national day to honor teachers. Mattie Whyte Woodridge (1909–1999), an educator from Helena, Arkansas, wrote to Eleanor Roosevelt, who in 1953 persuaded the 81st Congress to proclaim a National Teacher Day. The NEA along with its Kansas and Indiana state affiliates and the Dodge City, Kansas local NEA branch lobbied Congress to create a national day celebrating teachers. Congress declared 7 March 1980 as National Teacher Day for that year only. The NEA and its affiliates continued to observe Teacher Day on the first Tuesday in March until 1985, when the National PTA established Teacher Appreciation Week in the first full week of May. The NEA Representative Assembly then voted to make the Tuesday of that week National Teacher Day. As of 4 November 1976, 6 November was adopted as Teachers' Day in the U.S. state of Massachusetts. Currently, Massachusetts sets the first Sunday of June as its own Teachers' Day annually.
Uruguay	22 September	
Uzbekistan	1 October	Uzbekistan is one of the countries where Teachers' Day is on 1 October, and there is a day off throughout the country. Teachers' Day has been celebrated here since 1997.
Venezuela	15 January	
Vietnam	20 November	Vietnam Teachers' Day (or Vietnamese Teachers' Charter Day) is a memorial day celebrated annually on November 20. On this day, students often come to give flowers and gifts to teachers. The education sector also usually takes this opportunity to re-evaluate educational activities and set directions to improve the quality of education. The holiday has its origins in a meeting between educators in communist bloc nations in Warsaw in 1957. This day was first celebrated in 1958 throughout North Vietnam as the Day of the International Manifest of Educators; in 1982 the day was renamed Vietnamese Educators' Day.
Yemen	28 February	

A day for homeschool teacher appreciation has been suggested, which several homeschooling groups subsequently organized. A United States "parents as teachers day" has existed on 8 November since the 1970s. While this initially focussed on the role of parents in early-childhood learning, some homeschoolers use it to acknowledge the primacy of the parental role in education.

== See also ==
- International Day of Education
- Teacher's Oath
- World Teachers' Day – established by UNESCO
