= A Practical Reference to Religious Diversity for Operational Police and Emergency Services =

Policing publication

A Practical Reference to Religious and Spiritual Diversity for Operational Police is a publication of the Australia New Zealand Policing Advisory Agency.

== History ==
The National Police Ethnic Advisory Bureau conducted a nationwide survey in Australia and identified questions operational police had regarding religious determined behaviors and their impact on policing (see 1st ed. forward) in 1999. The first edition covered Buddhist, Hindu, Islamic, Jewish and Sikh faiths with participation of representatives of the various religions. Religion Statistics for National totals and by State and Territories from census 1996 were also included. It was sponsored by a collection of multicultural organizations from across Australia. It offered a two-page summary of the religion, issues on death, gender roles, sensitivity issues (gestures or interactions that cause offence), how to allow the taking of an oath, possible conflicts with religious calendars or events, and dealing with proper behavior at temples and members of its staff. The second edition added Christian, Australian Aboriginal and Torres Strait Islander religions, as well as the Baháʼí Faith, to the list of religions, while also including data from the 2001 census when published in 2002. A third edition was planned for publication in 2006-07 but was still in development in 2009. However, in 2005 a publication along the same lines was produced by the Mäori Pacific Ethnic Services, Office of the Commissioner, for New Zealand Police covering Māori religion, Buddhism, Christianity, Hinduism, Islam, Judaism, and Sikhism. It acknowledged the Australian publication's producers for "...a number of photographs and text on which to base the New Zealand version...". Another edition of the New Zealand document appears to have been published in 2009. The New Zealand edition also had appendices outlining: information from the United Nations Office of the High Commissioner for Human Rights, Treaty of Waitangi and religious freedom, religious affiliations government statistics in New Zealand, and artworks at the Royal New Zealand Police College. In 2010, the Australia New Zealand Policing Advisory Agency updated the Practical Reference to Religious and Spiritual Diversity for Operational Police. The Reference "provides police with a greater understanding of religious and spiritual diversity and to enhance services to the community". This third edition has been enhanced, updated and further informed by the feedback received from police jurisdictions, religious communities, individuals and government agencies. New to the third edition:

- the inclusion of Maori spirituality (nine spiritualities and religions are now included; the previous edition had eight)
- a review of the content so it provides essential information and advice on issues that police should know (i.e. on interviewing, searches, death etc.)
- a quick reference table on the most significant operational information
- a standard set of questions for all religions
- colour-coded tabs to assist with quick reference
- a streamlined question/answer format (the answers are all as short and succinct as possible)
- different publication formats – a handy pocket card and web version.

== Editions ==
1st edition
Author: National Police Ethnic Advisory Bureau.
Title: A Practical Reference to Religious Diversity for Operational Police.
Years: 2000–2002

2nd edition
Author: Australasian Police Multicultural Advisory Bureau.
Title: A Practical Reference to Religious Diversity for Operational Police and Emergency Services.
Years: 2002–2010

3rd edition
Author: Australia New Zealand Policing Advisory Agency.
Title: A Practical Reference to Religious and Spiritual Diversity for Operational Police.
Years: 2010-2022

4th edition
Author: Australia New Zealand Policing Advisory Agency.
Title: Religious and Spiritual Diversity Guide for Operational Police.
Years: 2022-current

== Reception ==
=== Religious individuals or non-governmental institutions ===
The publications have been generally received by a variety of religious individuals or non-governmental institutions:

- A Christian minister of St Barnabas Church, East Orange, New South Wales was a police chaplain who offered a sermon highlighting the project for his Easter service in 2006.
- It was listed as a resource for the public in a Cultural Planning Framework and Resource Kit of the Migrant Information Centre (Eastern Melbourne).
- In a report to The Winston Churchill Memorial Trust of Australia a senior Chaplain of the Victoria Police and Churchill Fellow extensively quoted and recommended the 2nd edition of the Australian publication to the Trust.
- The New Zealand edition was noted positively from Hindu commentary.
- New Zealand Commission on Human Rights approved of the work.
- The New Zealand Dominion Post presented an article summarizing the New Zealand publication briefly in context with an example case.
- The Hindu community was noted as reacting positively in the Thaindian News to the release of the revised edition in New Zealand in 2009.

=== Widespread uses in government ===
Several governments or divisions of government have cited it or used the publication in their deliberations:

- The New Zealand publication was noted in the Report of the Parliamentary Delegation to New Zealand: Australia-New Zealand Committee Exchange Program by the "Joint Standing Committee on Migration" of the government of Australia.
- The Australian publication was cited often during the inquiry of the proposed law on oath-taking in a report to the Parliament of Victoria.
- The Office of Multicultural Interests of the Department of Local Government of the Government of Western Australia used it as the sole source to outline the Sikh religion in its series Culture and Religion -Information Sheet.
- It was cited some 16 times and quoted extensive in one section of the publication Equality before the Law Bench Book, Section 4 — People with a particular religious affiliation by the Judicial Commission of New South Wales and a similar work by the Judicial Commission of Queensland office.
- It was listed as a resource in the Australian Department of Defence publication Defence Guide to Managing Diversity in the Workplace in 2004.

=== Professional publications ===
Several professional publications noted the document:

- The Australian Police Journal Online offered an editorial reviewing a newspaper coverage and support for the work.
- The Australian Institute of Criminology published a paper reviewing the publication calling it "excellent example of the commitment that all Australian policing jurisdictions have to police/ethnic relations, the emphasis of all jurisdictions is now largely focused on recruitment from ethnic communities" and "an extremely useful and internationally acclaimed publication...".
- The United States Federal Bureau of Investigation Law Enforcement Bulletin commented on it as an "effort at acknowledging the spiritual genesis of the profession provides a promising framework for collaborative, multidisciplinary approaches to many of law enforcement’s critical concerns."
- The Journal of Asian Association of Police Studies published a review of issues in the Vietnamese community in Australia. It noted the publication as part of a "the improved approach of the police services to criminal activity in ethnic communities" though problems had not ceased.
- Both the Australian publisher of the Australian publication and the New Zealand publication were mentioned as resources in a professional training education website for dealing with religious diversity in the context of test scenarios.

== See also ==
- Qur'an oath controversy of the 110th United States Congress about a question of oath taking and religion
- ACLU of N.C. & Syidah Matteen v. State of North Carolina for another case of oath taking and religion
- Massachusetts Teachers' Oath
- Oath of Allegiance in Canada
- Islamic scarf controversy in France as another example of religion of a minority interacting with a majority cultural point of view.
- Religious intolerance
- Religious segregation
