= Samuel Graves (disambiguation) =

Samuel Graves may refer to:

- Samuel Graves (1713–1787), British Royal Navy admiral in the American Revolutionary War
- Samuel Robert Graves (1818–1873), Irish-born British politician and businessman
- Samuel Monroe Graves (1878–1943) American educator and superintendent
- Sam Graves (born 1963), American politician; U.S. Representative from Missouri
