= Decisory oath =

Oath that conclusively resolves a factual dispute

A decisory oath or decisive oath is an oath that can decide a fact at issue in a legal dispute. A decisory oath that disclaims fault is also called an exculpatory oath.

Limited forms of decisory oath are found in some present-day civil law legal systems, where they are limited to civil litigation, and in some customary law systems. Historically decisory oaths enjoyed wide use, including in legal systems of Babylon and ancient Greece.

== In civil law ==
Decisory oaths are specifically provided for in the civil codes of certain civil law systems, including France, Italy, and Puerto Rico. However, its modern use in these systems is largely tactical. In these systems, when decisory oaths are allowed, they must be requested (or "referred") by the opposing party; having requested the oath, the requesting party is bound by it and is not permitted to present any proof that it is false.

If instead the second party requests that the first party demand the oath from it ("deferring" the oath), the first party does so, and the second party then refuses to swear, it is the second party that loses the case.

According to John Henry Merryman, "The Decisory Oath worked in the following way: Party A could put Party B on his oath as to a fact at issue that was within Party B's knowledge. If Party B refused to swear, the fact was taken as conclusively proved against him. If Party B swore, the fact was taken as conclusively proved in his favor." Mary Gregor explains that this procedure was "designed to protect the judge from threats from the wealthy and the powerful."

Decisory oaths were abolished in Brazilian law in 1850 by the commercial litigation reform of Regulamento 737; prior to that, a creditor seeking to avoid prescription of a debt could defeat the presumption that the debt had been paid by demanding a decisory oath from the debtor.

== In other legal traditions ==
Decisory oaths play a significant role in many African systems of customary law, including those of Niger. In the customary law of Nigeria, a person may swear a juju oath calling for themselves to be struck dead within the year if they are speaking falsely.

Decisory oaths are also found in the Babylonian Code of Hammurabi and are also mentioned in the Old Testament in chapter 22 of the Book of Exodus, which provides that someone who receives an animal for safekeeping that then dies can avoid any liability by swearing a decisory oath. They are also found in Talmudic law. Decisory oaths may also have served as a means of resolving criminal prosecutions in ancient Greek law. There is no historical record of a prosecution being ended in this way, but decisory oaths are mentioned in the Gortyn code.
