= Samuel Monroe Graves =

American educator (1878–1943)

Samuel Monroe Graves (September 11, 1878 – December 20, 1943) was an American educator who was the central figure in a widely reported, late 1930s effort to oust him as Superintendent of the Wellesley Public Schools in Massachusetts.

== Early life and family ==
=== Early life ===
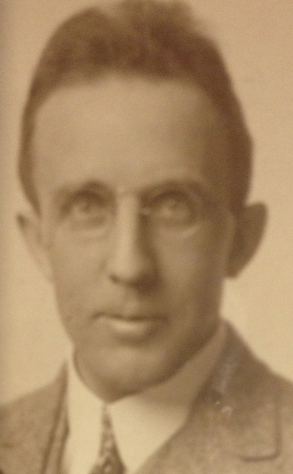
Samuel Monroe Graves

S. Monroe Graves (frequently misspelled as "Munroe" in contemporary newspapers) was born in Redfield, New York, the son of William Graves (1821-1900) and Frances Maria Freeman Graves (1839-1909). He attended Colgate University, graduating in 1902. He accepted a missionary teaching position in a remote area of the Philippines, which recently had become a colony of the United States following the Spanish–American War. He soon was appointed Superintendent of the Philippines school district in which he had been teaching.

Returning to the United States, he received a master's degree and then a doctorate from Harvard University in 1913. In 1914, he was appointed Superintendent of Schools of the Town of Wellesley, and also began teaching part-time at Wellesley College.

Graves served for 22 years. During this time, he also served as president of the Massachusetts Schoolmasters Association, the Massachusetts Superintendents Association, and the Norfolk County Teachers Association.

=== Family ===
Graves married the former Wilhelmina "Minnie" Landau (January 8, 1886 – October 2, 1978), an accomplished pianist. They had two daughters, Rose Christine (1914-2010) and Margaret Helen (1924-2015), and four sons, Samuel Monroe Jr. (1915-1957), William Gerhart (1917-1965), Freeman Pierce (1920-2008), and Francis "Frank" Malcolm (1927-2001).

== Controversy ==
=== Legal issues ===
In early July 1935, the School Committee asked Graves for his resignation, a request that was made several times. He refused. Following an uncontested February 1936 town election, the School Committee informed Graves they planned to hold a hearing on April 7, with the objective to oust the 22-year superintendent, to be effective on July 31. The narrow legal controversy centered around whether the committee could remove him as superintendent without cause.

The School Committee filed thirteen "secret" charges against Graves, the nature of which were kept from the public until after the School Committee voted to remove him from office. Most of the charges were vague, though one accused him of a "failure ... to create and maintain the school system as one continuous whole, rather than as three separate units, viz: Elementary schools, junior high school, and senior high school." Others accused him of failures "to cooperate," "to deal frankly," "to inspire," and "to exercise sufficient supervision."

Over 3,000 people signed petitions against the removal of Graves, in a town with about 6,000 voters. School Committee member Robert A. B. Cook challenged over 600 of the signatories, saying that 662 of them were not on the voting rolls, and were "probably maids, gardeners, etc." He thought that 100 signers were children of about 18 years old.

In addition to the former Attorney General, many prominent people supported Graves, including Harvard Professor Payson Smith, who himself had been fired as State Commissioner of Education by Governor Curley.

Two weeks before the hearing about whether to remove Graves, the School Committee had chosen a replacement, Edwin H. Miner of Slate Hill, NY. The School Committee announced removal of Graves on April 27, 1936, from the position paying $6,000 annually.

Following that vote, Graves brought a lawsuit to reverse his ouster without a proper hearing, and was defended by former Massachusetts Attorney General James M. Smith. On December 28, 1937, the State Judicial Court ruled in favor of Graves, stating that meetings held in April 1936 were insufficient, since removal could only be made with cause, and that the School Committee had introduced no witnesses nor evidence. The Court did state that they were acting under laws enacted in 1934, that extended certain rights of employment to superintendents similar to those of civil servants and police officers.

After that first Supreme Judicial Court ruling, the School Committee held a more formal hearing, following which the committee again voted to remove Graves. This led to a second appeal by Graves. State Supreme Court Justice James J. Ronan appointed a special master, Boston Municipal Court Special Justice F. Delano Putnam, to report on the controversy. According to one article, "Putnam's 54-page report to the court bristled with denunciations of the manner in which the hearings on the Graves case were conducted." State Supreme Court Justice Louis S. Cox accepted Putnam's findings, and ruled that the committee failed to have sufficient cause to remove Graves from office.

=== Context and underlying issues ===
Contemporary newspaper accounts of the controversy suggest that the charges against Graves were not the main reasons for the School Committee's opposition. An article in The Boston Globe reads, "... according to rumor throughout the town, (the controversy) came about originally because two sets of parents became indignant over reprimands given to their children for poor scholastic standing and such infractions of rules such as smoking in the basement." The article continues, "If the man on the street in Wellesley has the story right, the superintendent of schools was asked to discipline the teachers, and the superintendent answered that the teachers were perfectly right. His job, it was said, was the price of that decision."

However, there may have been even more important causes that preceded the charges. After Graves was tentatively removed from office, a related dispute developed regarding a proposed rezoning of the town's schools. According to James Bresnahan, chairman of the advisory committee of the Isaac Sprague School Parent-Teachers Association, Graves was ousted because he refused to make racial and social discrimination against certain classes of children. Bresnahan is quoted as saying, "I believe the reason the optional district plan was put into effect was to segregate certain children and others not well fixed socially and financially." The plan was expected to lead to combining some grades in the Sprague school because of low registration and having excessive class sizes in other schools. The zoning plan led to a five-day strike that kept children out of the Sprague School. In the end, the strike was cancelled in a "Compromise Proposed by School Board in 'Social War'". School Committeeman Robert A. B. Cook said the plan was revised to show the school committee was not trying to discriminate against poorer pupils. There had been an increase in the number of Italian-American children living in Wellesley, who may have been targets of discrimination. Bresnahan himself ran for a position on the School Committee, but was defeated.

It is ironic that the Chairman of the School Committee was Isaac Sprague, Jr., son of the late investment banker who had provided land for the school that was then named for him.

In a review of the story, the Boston Evening Globe reported that the controversy began when "One man wanted the town redistricted ... because he did not want to have his child attend a particular school where, he claimed, the social standing of pupils was not up to par with other Wellesley schools."

There is also an undocumented story that Graves supported the retention of a gay teacher against some community opposition.

=== Outcome and legacy ===
After Judge Louis S. Cox ordered the reinstatement of Graves, the Town of Wellesley had two school superintendents, and an agreement was reached that Graves would receive lost wages of about $15,000 and resign the position.

Graves died four years later. His health may have been weakened by stress caused by the personal and public ordeal, including having had limited income during the Great Depression.

In the 1960s, his daughter Rose Christine Graves Heiberg was elected to the Rockville Centre (New York) School Board, after a campaign supporting school policies that included input from racial minorities.
