= Augustus O. Thomas =

American educator

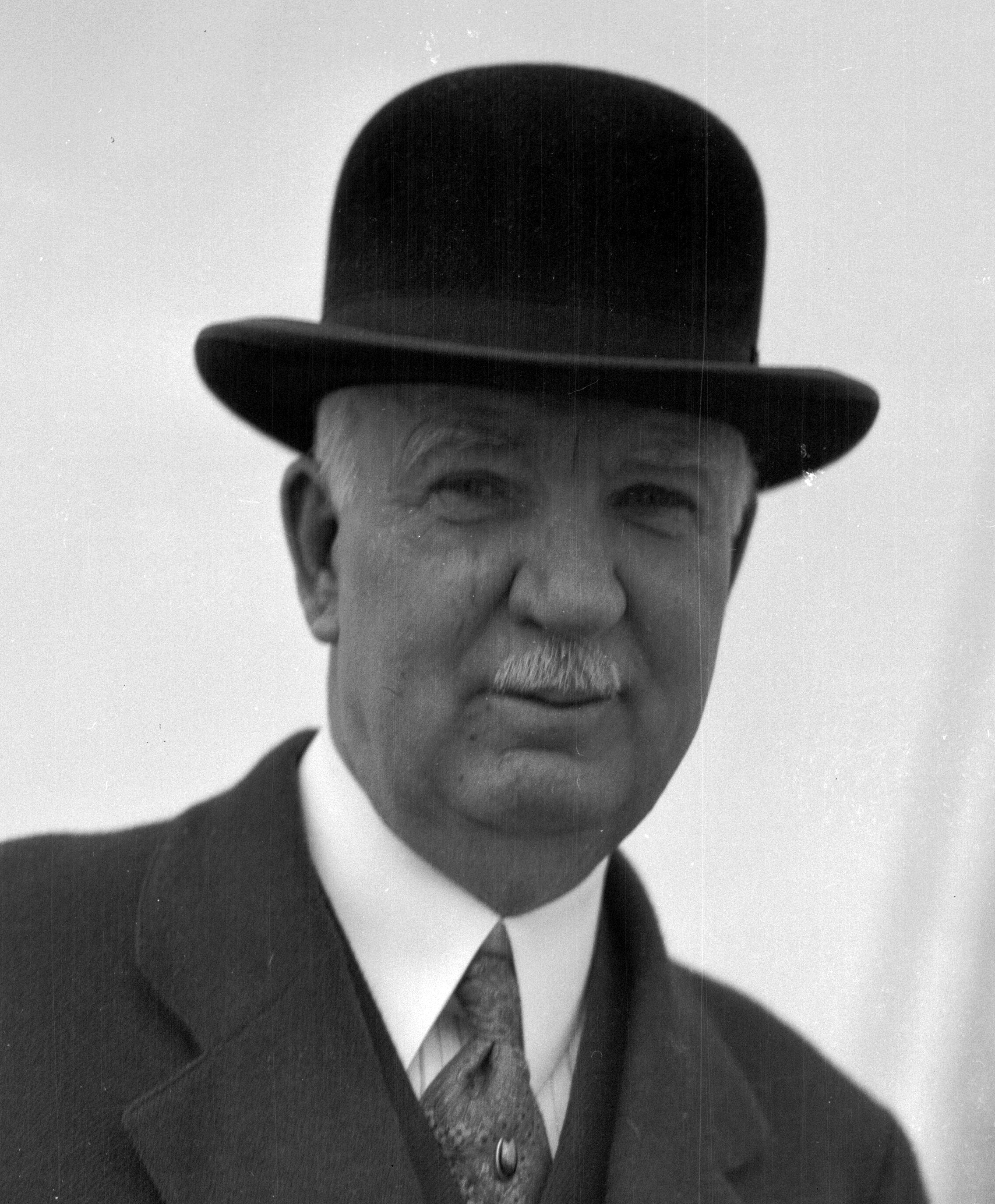
- Thomas in 1927

1st President of the Nebraska State Normal School at Kearney
- In office 1905–1913
- Preceded by: Position established
- Succeeded by: George S. Dick

Personal details
- Born: February 21, 1863 Mercer County, Illinois
- Died: January 30, 1935 (aged 71) Washington, D.C.
- Education: Western Normal College; Amity College
- Profession: Academic administrator and educator

Augustus Orloff Thomas (February 21, 1863 – January 30, 1935) was an American educator. Born in Mercer County, Illinois, he served as the first president of the Nebraska State Normal School at Kearney (1905–1913) and a hall is named for him on campus. Leaving Nebraska, he moved east to Maine, where he was the State Superintendent of Schools from 1917 to 1929. He was preceded in this position by Payson Smith and succeeded by Bertram E. Packard. He also helped found and served in the leadership of the World Federation of Education Associations from 1925 to 1935.

Born during the American Civil War, Thomas grew up on a farm in Iowa and attended local public schools. He graduated from Western Normal College in Shenandoah, Iowa, in 1891 with a Bachelor of Science. He then earned a Bachelor of Philosophy from Amity College, also in Iowa, in 1894.

He died on January 30, 1935, while in Washington, D.C. He had collapsed on the street and was being transported to the hospital when he died.
