= Yacovelli v. Moeser =

North Carolina court case regarding freedom of religion

The Yacovelli v. Moeser case, also known as the UNC-Qur'an Controversy, was a North Carolina court case resulting from a summer reading program for new students implemented by the University of North Carolina at Chapel Hill in 2002 that was objected to by several groups.

== Controversy ==
Professor Carl W. Ernst of the University of North Carolina at Chapel Hill (UNC) was asked if there was a good translation of the Qur'an that would be suitable for its Summer reading program of 2002. The program amounts to reading a short book, writing a short paper, and participating in small group discussion for two hours. He suggested Michael Sells (1999). Approaching the Qur'an. White Cloud Press. Ernst noted that if it were not available he could not recommend another for the program. The book was adopted and the program set.

On May 21, 2002, conservative commentator Brit Hume of Fox News released the first known news story on the forthcoming program followed by NPR on May 29. Early responses from parents directly to the university were generally negative though others said it was a courageous choice. Initially the ACLU and conservative commentators were concerned that a favoritism in religion was being shown. The then Chancellor of UNC, James Moeser, began to appear in various news outlets reporting some of the negative feedback his office had received but supporting the program noting most of the incoming students were assumed to be Christian or Jewish with a comparative lack of understanding Islam and that part of the mission of the university, its "great function", was to help expand understanding of other cultures. In July The O'Reilly Factor covered the controversy followed in August the television shows Good Morning America and Nightline as the time of the reading program approached.

Public talking points included whether the effort respected the suffering in light of September 11 attacks or that was an initial approach to the subject of Islam, a natural subject for review in light of 9-11.

Under pressure, the university changed the implementation of the program for the incoming class of 4,200 freshmen and transfer students by asking those who objected to reading the book to write a one-page essay explaining their reasons. Ultimately 2,260 freshmen took part on August 19 (after a court case ruled in favor of the university) in some 160 small group discussions led by one or more of 178 faculty and staff.

Significant news coverage began in July and continued through November 2002, while further analysis and recall of the experience continue to be published.

== Legal challenges ==
A conservative-Christian activist group, the Family Policy Network, filed suit in the U.S. District Court, Middle District of North Carolina, on July 22, 2002, representing several students who were allowed to remain anonymous seeking a preliminary injunction to keep UNC from conducting its summer program, alleging that it violated the Establishment Clause of the First Amendment and abridged students' rights to free exercise of religion by obliging them to study Islam against their will. The case was entitled Yacovelli v. Moeser (after James Yacovelli, a Family Policy Network spokesman, and James Moeser, the UNC Chancellor). The plaintiffs also asserted that the university through choosing Michael Sells book had misrepresented Islam by not by focusing on its more controversial elements. The university countered that the implementation of allowing students who objected to the reading to submit a single page report with their reasoning and thereby opt out of reading the book, but still participate in the discussions, insured that there was no violation of the Constitution and sought to continue with the program.

The court ruled in favor of UNC, and Family Policy Network appealed to the 4th Circuit Court of Appeals, [Yacovelli v. Moeser, Aff'd, Case No. 02-1889, (4th Cir., Aug. 19, 2002)] but lost again.

Between the case and its first appeal North Carolina state government representative J. Sam Ellis was among those that sought to limit funding for the summer reading program when on August 7 the House Appropriations Committee voted to bar public funds for use in UNC's 2002 summer reading program, unless "all known religions are given equal treatment." This proviso was removed when the state budget finally passed in mid-September.

The overall conclusion of Chief Judge N. Carlton Tilley, Jr., was that the book was strictly academic, not religious in nature, and therefore did not amount to a religious activity despite claims that listening to the CD exposes students to "the spell cast by a holy man of Islam" for example. The judge ended his analysis with an application of the "Lemon test" deriving from the Lemon vs. Kurtzman court case. Chief Judge Tilley said:

Approaching the Qur'an" simply cannot be compared to religious practices that have been deemed violative of the "Establishment Clause", such as posting the Ten Commandments, reading the Lord's Prayer, or reciting prayers in school. The book does include surahs, which are similar to Christian Psalms. However, by his own words, the author endeavors only to explain Islam and not to endorse it. Furthermore, listening to Islamic prayers in an effort to understand the artistic nature of the readings and its connection to a historical religious text does not have the primary effect of advancing religion.

The university's lawyers observed that the U.S. Supreme Court endorsed the academic study of religion in public schools and universities when Justice Tom C. Clark in 1963 declared, "one's education is not complete without a study of comparative religion or the history of religion and its relationship to the advancement of civilization." Based on this as it applies to the Qur'an specifically, university officials then argued that, in addition to being constitutionally permissible, one's education is not complete without a study of the Qur'an (as well as the history of Islam) and its relationship to the advancement of civilization.

A revised challenge by the American Family Association's Center for Law and Policy, who had represented FPN all along, was filed in 2004, [Yacovelli v. Moeser, 2004 U.S. Dist. LEXIS 9152, (M.D.N.C. May 20, 2004)] which also lost on appeal, [Motion granted by, dismissed by Yacovelli v. Moeser, 324 F. Supp. 2d 760, 2004 U.S. Dist. LEXIS 12815 (M.D.N.C., July 7, 2004)] addressed various challenges of presenting material online related to the program by ruling it was in fact just focused on presenting the program rather than religious instruction.

== Media ==
UNC's own count of news coverage includes some 41 days, with some days having many news stories – for example, August 28 has 31 instances of coverage. On August 27, C-SPAN covered Chancellor Moeser's speech at the National Press Club. He noted many of the objections his office had received. In addition to those already mentioned, many other news outlets covered the controversy, including The Daily Show with Jon Stewart.

== See also ==
- American Civil Liberties Union of North Carolina v. North Carolina
- 2015 Chapel Hill shooting
- Persecution of Muslims in the United States
