= Teacher's Oath =

Oath taken by teachers

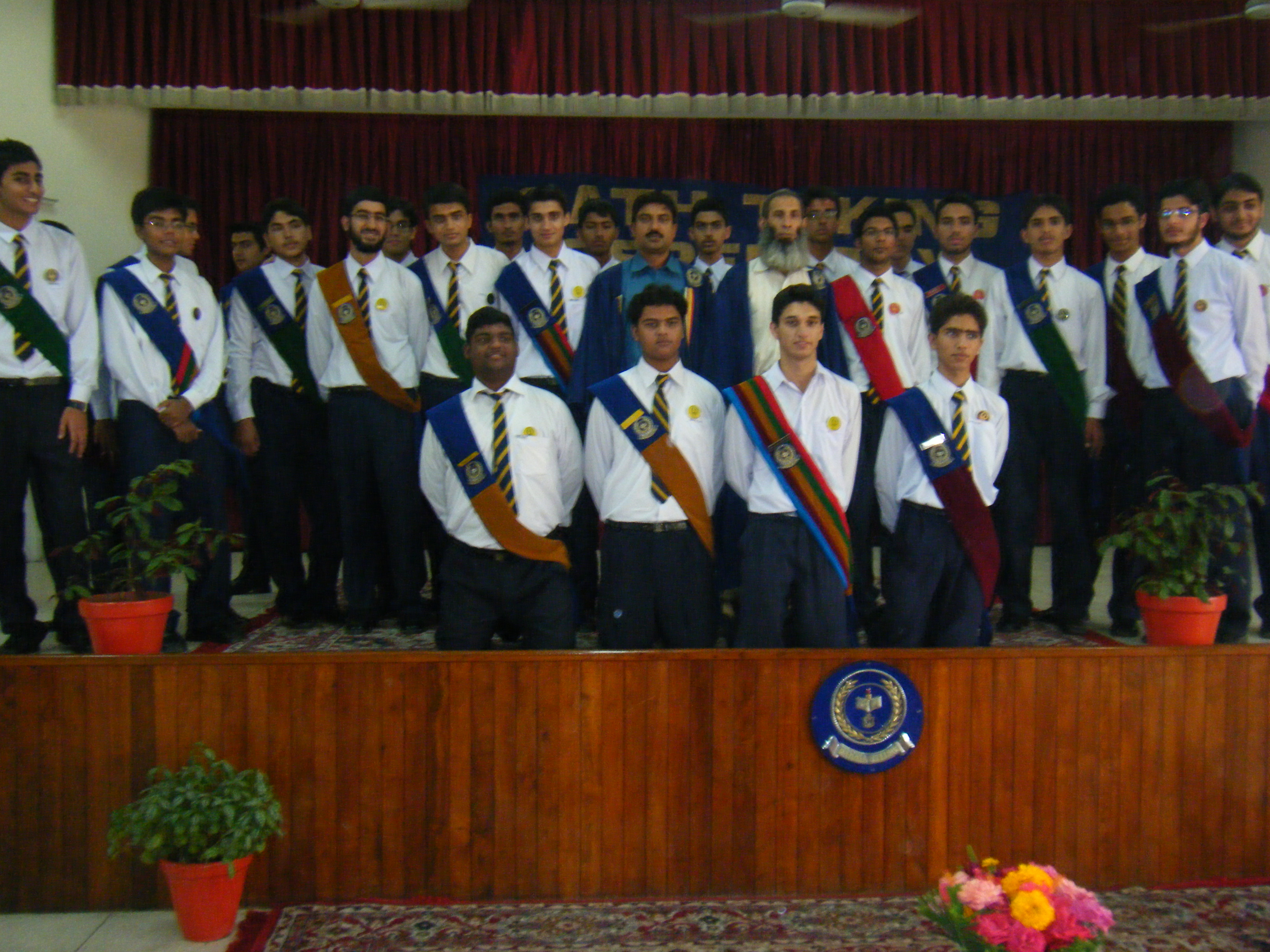
Bahria College Islamabad - Oath Taking Ceremony 2009

A Teacher's Oath is an oath taken in some countries by teachers.

In 1993, the German educator Hartmut von Hentig designed the Socratic Oath, which is supposed to be a set of professional guidelines for educators, teachers and paedagogues. In 2022, after the COVID-19 pandemic effected some dramatic changes in the world and in the education system, the German educator Klaus Zierer published a renewal of the Socratic Oath, which is based on the research of the educator John Hattie and has not only a theoretical approach but also an empirical base.

Today there are many different versions of the Teacher's Oath, for example the Comenius Oath in Finland, Teachers' Oath Taking in Philippines, Abdul Kalam Teachers Oath in India, Teachers Pledge in Singapore and Betimi i Mësuesit in Kosovo.

Since 1863, nearly two-thirds of US states have adopted loyalty oaths for teachers. The Massachusetts Teachers' Oath was a loyalty oath required to teach in Massachusetts from 1935 to 1967.

== Socratic Oath ==
As teacher and educator I undertake,

- to respect the uniqueness of each child and to defend them against everyone;
- to stand up for their physical and mental integrity;
- to pay attention to their emotions, to listen to them, to take them seriously;
- to seek their approval for anything I do to them as I would an adult;
- to interpret the rules of their development in the most positive way and to support the child to accept these rules;
- to challenge and to promote their gifts and potentials;
- to protect them, where they are weak, to help them overcome fear and guilt, malice and lies, doubt and distrust, self-pity and selfishness where it is needed;
- not to break their will, not even where it appears nonsensical, rather, to help them bring their will into the dominion of their reason; so to teach them the mature use of reason and the art of communication and understanding;
- to prepare them to take over responsibility within and for the community;
- to let them engage with the world as it is without submitting to the world as it is;
- to let them experience what a good life might mean;
- to give them a vision of a better world and the confidence that it might be achievable;
- to teach truthfulness, not the truth because "that is with God alone".

I hereby undertake,

- as best I can, to set an example for myself how to deal with the difficulties, challenges, and opportunities of our world and with one's own limited gifts and how to cope with one's own always given guilt;
- to do my best to ensure that the next generation will find a world worth living in, and in which the inherited burdens and difficulties will not crush their ideas, hopes and strengths;
- to justify publicly my beliefs and deeds, to expose myself to criticism, particularly of those affected and experts, and to examine my judgments conscientiously;
- and to resist all people and circumstances - the pressure of public opinion, the interests of the association, the status of an official, the service regulation, if I believe they might hinder the intentions expressed here.

~ Hartmut von Hentig - 1993

== Other versions ==
As a teacher, I commit myself to directing all my feelings, thoughts and actions in my profession towards the well-being of the children entrusted to me.

I commit myself to the children,

- to challenge and support each child according to his or her potential and level of development,

- not to leave any child behind or to write them off, no matter what the reasons are,

- to take the failure of the children entrusted to me again and again as an opportunity for new ways of teaching,

- to see mistakes as an opportunity, not as a flaw,

- to set challenges in the educational process so that underachallenge and overchallenge do not occur,

- to look for, pick up and awaken motivations,

- to enter into dialogue again and again, to give and receive feedback, to ask questions and to listen,

- to attribute a serving function to subjects in the educational process,

- to address and stimulate all areas of the personality,

- to give confidence in the world and in oneself and to make it visible on a daily basis,

- to understand and shape the class and the school as a welcoming place,

- to provide for an appreciative, fear-free and educationally effective atmosphere and relationship, and

- to stand up for the physical, mental and spiritual integrity of the children entrusted to me.

I commit myself to the parents

- to communicate at eye level and to build up an educational partnership,

- to understand the educational process of the children as a common task,

- not only to be prepared to talk to them regularly, but also to actively seek contact with them, and

- to take their assessments of the children's educational success and progress seriously and to combine them with their own views.

I commit myself to my colleagues,

- to share my experiences in education and teaching and to use them as a basis for collegial professionalisation,

- to share and reflect together on the mistakes made every day,

- to reflect back on successful moments in school and to give mutual recognition, and

- to allow everyone their individual perspective on school and teaching while working towards a shared vision.

I commit myself to the educational public,

- to accept the educational mandate and to implement it at all times,

- not only to impart knowledge and skills, but to focus on and promote all areas of the personality,

- to subordinate all subjects to the well-being of the child and thus to the educational mission,

- to be loyal but not blind to official guidelines,

- to implement everything that serves the best interests of the children and to reject everything that is contrary to the best interests of the child,

- to critically question, and if necessary publicly denounce and reject, any interests and demands on school and teaching that are not primarily in the best interests of the child, and

- to give a voice to children and their right to education in public discourse.

I commit myself to society,

- to see respect for human dignity as the basis and goal of school and education,

- to teach the principles of our democracy and to defend them in school and in teaching,

- to see school as a place of reproduction and innovation of social values,

- to use my pedagogical freedom to place current issues at the centre of everyday school life, and

- to be not only reactive but also proactive towards the further development of our society.

To myself I commit myself,

- to justify my actions at all times, to discuss them critically and constructively and to reflect on them conscientiously,

- to regularly develop my professional, pedagogical and didactic competences,

- regularly reflect on my professional attitudes, and

- to always fulfil my role as a role model to the best of my knowledge and belief.

I confirm what has been said by my willingness to be measured at all times against the standards that emanate from this commitment.

~ Klaus Zierer - 2022

== See also ==
- Hippocratic Oath
- Massachusetts Teachers' Oath
- Socrates
- Teachers day
- International Day of Education
