= Michael Sells =

American Islamic studies scholar (born 1949)

- Born: Michael Anthony Sells; May 8, 1949 (age 77); Butte, Montana, United States
- Citizenship: American
- Occupations: Professor, author
- Title: John Henry Barrows Professor

Academic background
- Education: University of Chicago Divinity School 1978-82
- Alma mater: University of Chicago

Academic work
- Discipline: Religion, literature
- Sub-discipline: Islamic History and Literature, Comparative Literature, Quranic studies
- Institutions: Divinity School professor
- Main interests: Sufism, Arabic and Islamic love poetry, mysticism (Greek, Islamic, Christian, and Jewish), and religion and violence
- Notable works: Approaching the Qur'an: the Early Revelations; The Bridge Betrayed: Religion and Genocide in Bosnia; The New Crusades: Constructing the Muslim Enemy
- Notable ideas: Christoslavism

Michael Anthony Sells (born May 8, 1949) is John Henry Barrows Professor of Islamic History and Literature in the Divinity School and in the Department of Comparative Literature at the University of Chicago. Michael Sells studies and teaches in the areas of Qur'anic studies, Sufism, Arabic and Islamic love poetry, mysticism (Greek, Islamic, Christian, and Jewish), and religion and violence.

== Work ==
He completed a new and expanded edition of his 1999 book Approaching the Qur'an: the Early Revelations which was at the center of the case Yacovelli v. Moeser about the University of North Carolina at Chapel Hill's summer program in 2002.

Sells also published three volumes on Arabic poetry, Desert Tracings: Six Classic Arabian Odes, Stations of Desire, and The Cambridge History of Arabic Literature, Al-Andalus, which he co-edited and to which he contributed. His books on mysticism include Early Islamic Mysticism, translations and commentaries on influential mystical passages from the Quran, hadith, Arabic poetry, and early Sufi writings, as well as Mystical Languages of Unsaying, an examination of apophatic language, with special attention to Plotinus, John Scotus Eriugena, Ibn Arabi, Meister Eckhart, and Marguerite Porete. His work on religion and violence includes The Bridge Betrayed: Religion and Genocide in Bosnia, and The New Crusades: Constructing the Muslim Enemy which he co-edited and to which he contributed. He teaches courses on the topics of the Qur'an, Islamic love poetry, comparative mystical literature, Arabic Sufi poetry, and ibn Arabi.

== Christoslavism ==
Michael Sells argues that religious mythology played a crucial role in the Bosnian genocide. He wrote about the religious ideology of Christoslavism:

In the nineteenth century, the three myths – conversion to Islam based only upon cowardice and greed, stable ethnoreligious groups down through the centuries, and complete depravity of Ottoman rule – became the foundation for a new religious ideology, Christoslavism, the belief that Slavs are Christian by nature and that any conversion from Christianity is a betrayal of the Slavic race.

Sells argues that the Bosnian genocide

was religiously motivated and religiously justified. Religious symbols, mythologies, myths of origin (pure Serb race), symbol of passion (Lazar's death), and eschatological longings (the resurrection of Lazar) were used by religious nationalists to create a re-duplicating Miloš Obilić, avenging himself on the Christ killer, the race traitor, the alien, and, ironically, the falsely accused 'fundamentalist' next door. The ideology operated not only in speeches and manifestos, but in specific rituals of atrocity. Survivors of concentration camps report that during torture sessions or when they begged for water they were made to sing Serbian religious nationalist songs reworded to reflect the contemporary conflict.

Sells argues that those acts were seen as ethnoreligious purification:

Christoslavism – the premise that Slavs are by essence Christian and that conversion to another religious is a betrayal of the people or race – was critical to the genocidal ideology being developed in 1989. Christoslavism places Slavic Muslims and any Christian who would tolerate them in the position of the Judas figure of Kosovo, Vuk Branković. It sets the Slavic Muslims outside the boundaries of nation, race, and people. As portrayed in The Mountain Wreath, it demonstrates what can be done to those defined as nonpeople and what is, under certain circumstances, a religious duty and a sacred, cleansing act. It transfers the generalized curse of Kosovo onto Slavic Muslims in particular, a curse against the natal milk that will allow them to progenerate. In their acts of genocide from 1992 through 1995, Radovan Karadžić and his followers integrated the Kosovo tradition, as it was handed down through Vuk Karadžić and transformed by Njegoš and Andrić, into the daily rituals of ethnoreligious purification.

== Personal life ==
Sells is of Serbian descent.

== Bibliography ==
- Sells, Michael (1994). Mystical Languages of Unsaying. Chicago: University of Chicago Press. ISBN 0226747875.
- Sells, Michael (1996). Early Islamic Mysticism. New York: Paulist Press.
- Sells, Michael (1998). The Bridge Betrayed: Religion and Genocide in Bosnia. University of California Press. ISBN 0-520-21662-8.
- Sells, Michael Anthony (1998). "Serbian religious nationalism, Christoslavism, and the genocide in Bosnia, 1992-1995". In Mojzes, Paul (ed.). Religion and the War in Bosnia. Oxford University Press / Scholars Press. ISBN 978-0788504280.
- Sells, Michael (2007). Approaching the Qur'an: The Early Revelations (2nd ed.). Ashland: White Cloud Press. ISBN 978-1883991692.
- Qureshi, Emran; Sells, Michael, eds. (2003). The New Crusades. New York: Columbia University Press. ISBN 978-0-231-12667-0.
