= International Day of Education =

Annual observance day dedicated to education

- Official name: International Day of Education
- Observed by: United Nations
- Begins: 2019
- Date: 24 January
- Next time: 24 January 2026

International Day of Education is an annual international observance day held on 24 January and is dedicated to education. In 2018, the United Nations General Assembly (UNGA) adopted a resolution proclaiming 24 January as International Day of Education, in celebration of the role of education for bringing global peace and sustainable development.

== History ==
The UNGA's declaration of 24 January as the International Day of Education occurred on 3 December 2018. In collaboration with UNESCO to create the event were the permanent missions of five countries: Ireland, Nigeria, Norway, Qatar, and Singapore. The first celebration of this event was the following month on 24 January 2019.

A succinct explanation of UNGA's broad aims in creating the International Day of Education is the following:

Education being one of the most important of the 17 sustainable goals laid down by the United Nations to transform the world, this day is celebrated every year since 2019 to draw attention of people, mobilize political will across the nations and generate resources towards education being an indispensable tool for building knowledgeable and sustainable communities. International day of education commemorates the acknowledgement and reinforcement of ‘Education’ being a basic need of every individual.

Below is a list of International Day of Education topics from its first celebration in 2019 to 2026:

- 2019: Education: A Key Driver for Inclusion and Empowerment
- 2020: Learning for People, Planet, Prosperity and Peace
- 2021: Reclaiming and Revitalizing Education for the COVID-19 Generation
- 2022: Turning the Tide, Transforming Education
- 2023: Investing in People, Prioritizing Education
- 2024: Learning for Lasting Peace
- 2025: Artificial Intelligence (but also listed as AI and Education: Preserving Human Agency in a World of Automation by UNESCO)
- 2026: The power of youth in co-creating education

== See also ==
- Teachers' Day
- Teacher's Oath
- World Teachers' Day
