= William Wallace Stetson =

American educator (1849–1910)

William Wallace Stetson (1849- July 1, 1910) was an American educator from Maine. From 1895 to 1907, he served as State Superintendent of Schools before being replaced in May 1907 by Payson Smith. From 1906 to 1907, Stetson served as president of the American Association of School Administrators.

Stetson died on July 1, 1910, at his home on Minot Avenue in Auburn, Maine.
