= Australasian Police Multicultural Advisory Bureau =

Australasian Police Multicultural Advisory Bureau (formerly the National Police Ethnic Advisory Bureau) was an agency of the Department of Immigration and Multicultural Affairs of the Government of Australia. It was established under the auspices of the Conference of Commissioners of Police, Australasia and the South West Pacific Region.

== Mosaic Fund ==
The impetus for the establishment of the Bureau was the 1990 National Conference on Police Services in a Multicultural Australia. The Conference outcomes recognised the need for an agency which would enhance the professionalism of police service delivery in culturally diverse societies through strategies based on communication, co-operation and consultation. Applicants must demonstrate a partnership with the community in the development and implementation of a project, event or activity. Newly settled and emerging communities, young people and prevention programs are a particular focus of the Mosaic Fund. It is consistent with a fundamental shift in policing strategies which emphasise the importance of partnership building between police and culturally diverse communities. These partnerships harness and build on the benefits of cultural diversity and further strengthen community cohesion and a commitment to a multicultural Australia.

== Australasian Police Multicultural Advisory Bureau Awards ==
The Awards have been set up to recognise police members, both sworn and non-sworn, who have contributed significantly to the development and advancement of partnerships between police and Australia's culturally diverse communities. The Awards aim to demonstrate, by example, the tangible benefits and positive outcomes of establishing harmonious relations between police and the multicultural community.

== Publications ==
The Bureau has several publications dealing with multi-faith issues and social and governmental relationships in Australia.

A Practical Reference to Religious Diversity for Operational Police and Emergency Services covers oaths, Death, Gender Roles and Family, Physical Contact and sensitivities (like giving blood samples), Religious Practices and Policing and other topics covering twelve faith-traditions.

Policing in a Culturally Diverse Australia: Governing Principles, Recruitment from Ethnic Communities: National Statement of Principle, and Guidelines for Organisers of Cultural Events: Demonstrations and Marches are among its publications.

== Achievements ==
Mr. Ivan Kolarik, Executive Director of the National Police Ethnic Advisory Bureau, (winner of the 2003 Medal of the Order of Australia for his key role in changing the relationship between the police and Australia's Non English Speaking Background communities) lists a long and far reaching series of achievements of the Bureau. In a paper/opening address presented at the 2001 Policing Partnerships in a Multicultural Australia: Achievements and Challenges Conference he notes the " internationally acclaimed publication of ‘A Practical Reference to Religious Diversity for Operational Police’, production of a series of training packages called “Dealing with Racist Violence” under the auspice of 'Living in Harmony', active participation on steering committees for research projects, such as 'Ethnic Youth Gangs' in Australia and 'Multicultural Perspectives of Crime and Safety', development of “National Guidelines on Descriptions of Persons Issued by Police to the Media”, the leading role in research on “Collection of Ethnicity Data on Alleged Criminal Offenders” and the current study examining issues relevant to the retention of police officers from diverse backgrounds. And the list can go on. Over the years the Bureau has earned an excellent reputation with the international community. I am personally very proud of the fact that the Bureau served as a model for the “Rotterdam Charter for Policing in Multi-ethnic Europe”. In addition, the Bureau is considered as a best practice model by the police authorities in the Czech Republic and the People’s Republic of China." (OPENING ADDRESS
