= World Teachers' Day =

Annual international day

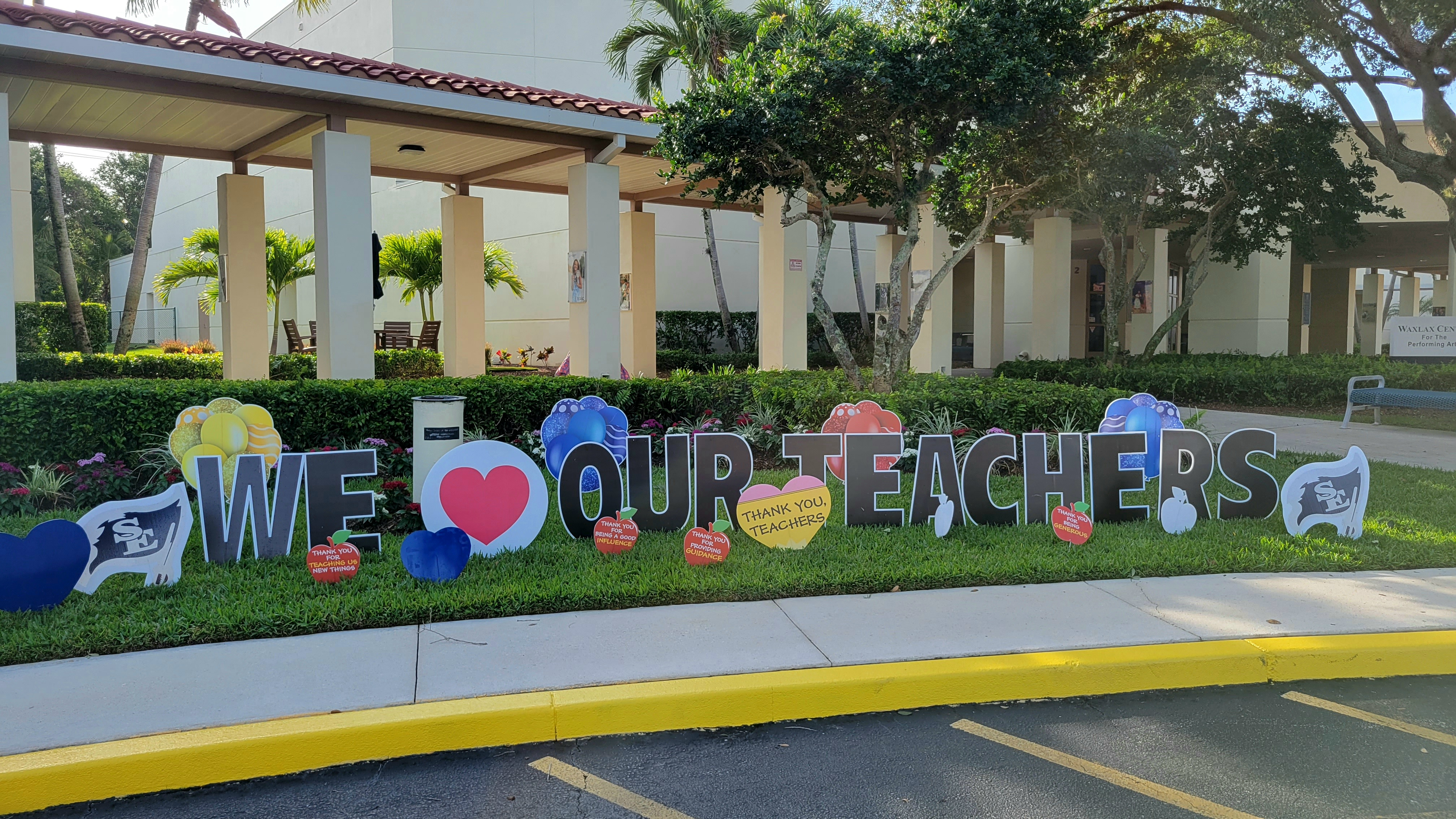
Teacher Appreciation Week decoration at Saint Edward's School in Vero Beach, Florida

World Teachers' Day is an international day held annually on October 5 to celebrate the work of teachers. Established in 1994, it commemorates the signing of the 1966 "ILO/UNESCO Recommendation concerning the Status of Teachers" by the International Labour Organization (ILO) and the United Nations Educational, Scientific and Cultural Organization (UNESCO), which is a standard-setting instrument that addresses the status and situations of teachers around the world. This recommendation outlines standards relating to education personnel policy, recruitment, and initial training as well as the continuing education of teachers, their employment, and working conditions. World Teachers' Day aims to focus on "appreciating, assessing and improving the educators of the world" and to provide an opportunity to consider issues related to teachers and teaching.

== Celebration ==
To celebrate World Teachers' Day, the United Nations Educational, Scientific and Cultural Organization (UNESCO) and Education International (EI) mount a campaign each year to help give the world better understanding of teachers and the role they play in the development of students and society. They partner with the private sector such as media organizations to achieve this purpose. The campaign focuses on different themes for every year. For instance, "Empowering Teachers" was the theme for 2017, the year World Teachers' Day commemorated the 20th anniversary of the 1997 UNESCO Recommendation concerning the Status of Higher-Education Teaching Personnel, bringing the sometimes-neglected area of teaching personnel at higher education institutions into the conversation about the status of teachers.

The following year, 2018, UNESCO adopted the theme "The Right to Education Means the Right to a Qualified Teacher", commemorating the 70th anniversary of the Universal Declaration of Human Rights (1948) and serving as a reminder that the right to education cannot be realized without trained and qualified teachers. UNESCO declares that everyone can help by celebrating the profession, by generating awareness about teacher issues and by ensuring that teacher respect is part of the natural order of things. Schools and students, for instance, prepare a special occasion for teachers on this day.

More than 100 countries commemorate World Teachers' Day and each holds its own celebrations such as the case of India, which has been commemorating National Teachers' Day every 5 September. In Australia, as the day usually falls during school holidays, Australian states and territories celebrate on the last Friday of October each year instead.

The theme of World Teachers' Day 2023 is "The teachers we need for the education we want". UNESCO estimates that the world needs over 69 million new teachers by 2030, and the shortage only continues to grow.

The 2024 celebrations focused on "Valuing teacher voices: towards a new social contract for education". The theme underscores the urgency of engaging with teachers to address the challenges they face but, most importantly, to acknowledge and benefit from the expert knowledge and input they bring to education.

== See also ==
- Education International – Global federation of teachers unions
- International Day of Education – Annual observance day dedicated to education
