= Massachusetts Teachers' Oath =

The Massachusetts Teachers' Oath was a loyalty oath required to teach in Massachusetts from 1935 to 1967.

== Passage ==
In response to political radicalism during the Great Depression, several states passed legislation that required public school teachers to submit signed oaths of loyalty to the state and/or federal Constitutions. This movement, supported by the national American Legion and other organizations, gained strength in Massachusetts in 1934 and 1935.

In 1935, after stormy hearings before the General Court's Joint Education Committee at which Harvard President James B. Conant, historian Samuel Eliot Morison, and the presidents of several colleges and universities spoke against the legislation, the Republican-dominated House and Senate enacted teachers' oath legislation. The oath bill was introduced by Democratic state Representative Thomas Dorgan. Dorgan became known as the "Father of the Teachers' Oath," and resisted all efforts at repeal, both in and out of office.

The Massachusetts legislation was unique in that it applied to private educational institutions as well as public. It prompted the resignations of two Tufts University professors, Earle Winslow and Alfred C. Lane in December 1935. Lane moved to Florida, but Winslow decided to run for the Democratic Party's nomination for the 9th Congressional District in 1936. In the September primary, he came in 5th out of six candidates, earning only 1,452 votes out of 27,948 cast. Thomas Dorgan lost in his bid for the nomination for Suffolk County Court Clerk. He secured a position with the state Department of Taxation, and in 1939 Democratic Mayor Maurice Tobin appointed him "legislative agent" for the City of Boston.

== In force ==
Harvard Geology Professor Kirtley Mather took a strong stand against the oath, but under pressure from President Conant he submitted a signed oath form in December 1935. The Quaker Harvard Professor of Religion, Henry Cadbury, rejected the teacher's oath in the 1930s, for reasons of conscience, telling the truth, and as a form of social activism. He accepted the Hollis Professorship in Divinity at Harvard.

The controversy also cost the long-serving state Commissioner of Education Payson Smith his job. Smith had spoken out against the legislation during the hearings, but nevertheless strictly enforced the law despite a compromise worked out with leading educators and the Attorney General, Paul Dever. Despite this, Democratic Governor James Michael Curley wanted Smith out. Smith's term expired on December 1, 1935, and he continued to serve as Acting Commissioner while he awaited his fate. The media and educational leaders pressured Curley to re-appoint Smith, so Curley met with the Democrats on the Governor's Council in closed session shortly before they were to vote on the issue. When the Council met, Curley submitted Smith's name and it was promptly rejected. Curley then nominated Adams, Massachusetts school superintendent James G. Reardon, and the Council voted to approve him. Reardon, a graduate of Boston College, had spoken out in favor of the oath law.

== Repeal ==
In 1936, several well-respected educators, including Morison and Mather, joined together to form the Massachusetts Society for Freedom in Teaching (MSFT) to coordinate efforts to repeal the oath legislation. This organization worked closely with educational leaders like Conant and President Daniel Marsh of Boston University to lobby for repeal. As a result of the November elections, sixty representatives who supported the oath were not returned to the House, and oath opponents hoped that this change could lead to repeal.

The Republican House and Senate did pass repeal legislation in March 1937, but the vote in both chambers proved very close: 21–19 in the Senate, and 120–112 in the House. Democratic Governor Charles Francis Hurley vetoed the legislation, claiming that it was an important part of the fight against radicals and Communists. Opponents of the oath in the House were unable to muster the two-thirds majority required to override Hurley's veto, which was sustained by a vote of 101–100.

Although newly elected Republican Governor Leverett Saltonstall indicated that he would sign a repeal bill in early 1939, it failed to pass the state legislature.

The teachers' oath legislation remained in force until invalidated by the Massachusetts Supreme Judicial Court in 1967 in its ruling on Pedlosky v. Massachusetts Institute of Technology. The Massachusetts General Court passed legislation to repeal all loyalty oaths in 1986, which was signed by Governor Michael Dukakis.

== See also ==
- ACLU of Massachusetts
- Teacher's Oath
