= Payson Smith =

American educator

Personal details
- Born: February 11, 1873; Portland, Maine, United States
- Died: March 11, 1963 (aged 90); Portland, Maine, United States
- Education: Tufts University (MA) University of Maine (LLD)
- Occupation: Educator

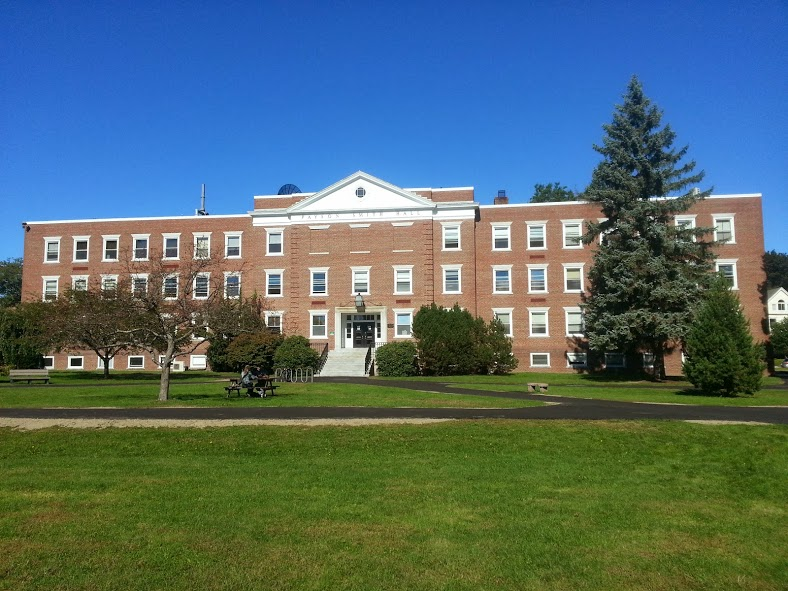
Payson Smith Hall at the University of Southern Maine's Portland campus was named for him in 1960.

Payson Smith (February 11, 1873 – March 11, 1963) was an American educator. He served as Superintendent of Schools of Maine from 1907 to 1917 and in that same role (Commissioner of Education) in Massachusetts from 1917 to 1935. He also served on the faculty of the Graduate School of Education at Harvard University and the University of Maine.

== Early life ==
Born in Portland, Maine, Smith was the son of John Parker and Margaret (Bolton) Smith. His father was a well-known barber in a city hotel. As a child, Smith studied in Portland Public Schools, Westbrook Seminary and Tufts College. He earned a Master of Arts from Tufts in 1903. He also earned an L.L.D. from the University of Maine in 1908.

== Teaching career ==
=== Maine ===
After teaching classics at Westbrook Seminary for two years, he was hired to be school principal and then superintendent of schools in the small town of Canton, Maine. In 1896 at the age of 23, he was elected superintendent of schools for Rumford and Mexico. Seven years later, in November 1903, Smith left that position when he was hired as superintendent of Auburn public schools after the resignation of Bertram C. Richardson. In 1906, he was elected president of the Maine Teachers' Association and in so doing became the organization's youngest leader at the age of 33. In May 1907, Smith was appointed by Governor William T. Cobb as Maine State Superintendent of Education, replacing William Wallace Stetson. Prior to become state superintendent, Smith was the highest-paid official in the city of Auburn. In that role, he was very actively involved with the National Education Association, which at the time included primarily educational administrators. Smith was replaced in the role of Maine's top educator by Augustus O. Thomas.

=== Massachusetts ===
On July 1, 1916, Smith replaced David Snedden as Commissioner of Education for Massachusetts. The salary was $6,500 per year with a term of five years. In 1932, he was elected as to the American Academy of Arts and Sciences. He was a vocal opponent of the Massachusetts Teachers' Oath, a loyalty oath which required educators to submit signed oaths of loyalty to the state and federal Constitutions. Smith spoke against the oath before it became law but enforced it in his role as Commissioner of Education. Despite this, Democratic Governor James Michael Curley replaced Smith with oath-supporter James G. Reardon in December 1935.
