= American Civil Liberties Union of North Carolina v. North Carolina =

North Carolina court case regarding Freedom of Religion

American Civil Liberties Union of North Carolina v. State
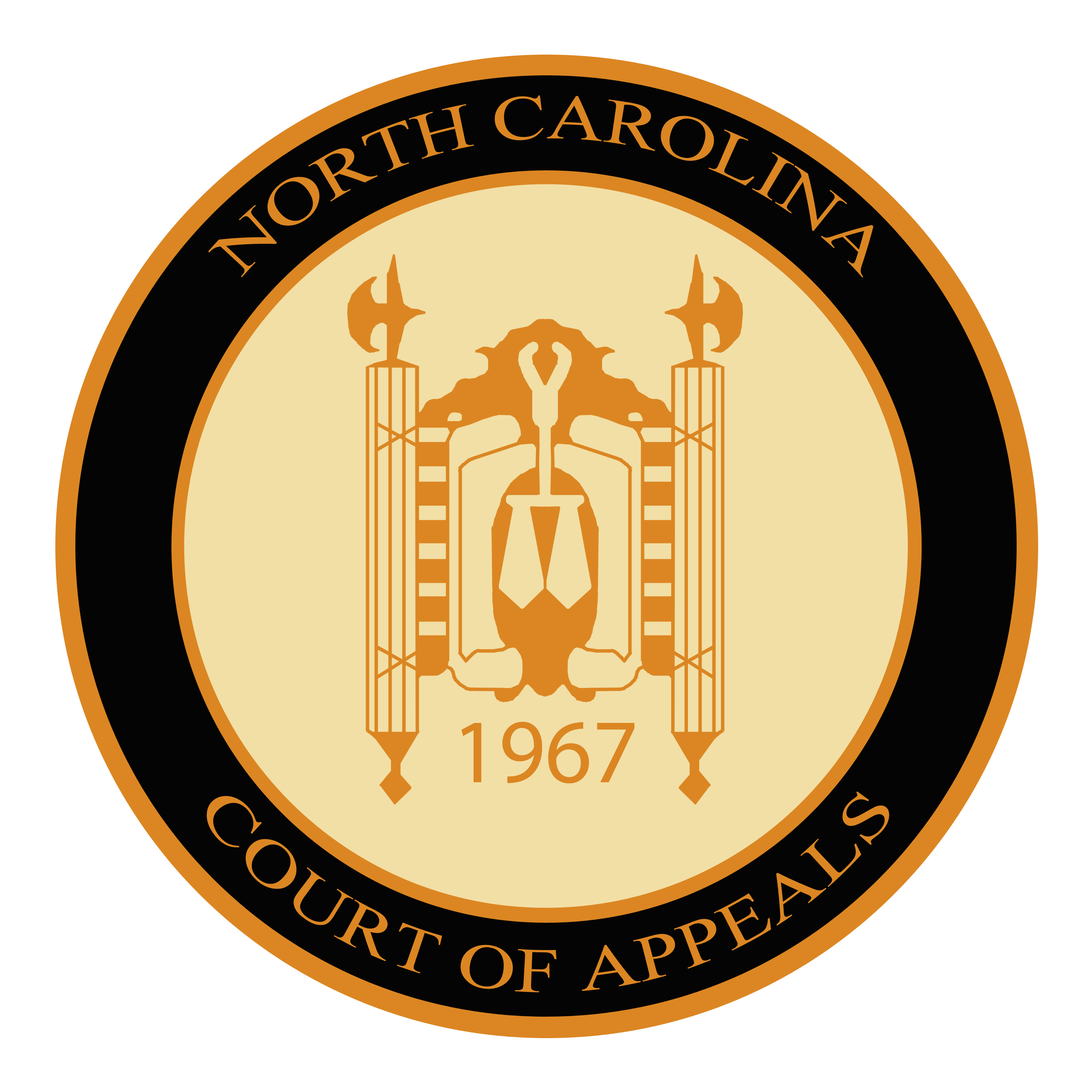
- Court: Court of Appeals of North Carolina
- Full case name: American Civil Liberties Union of North Carolina, Inc., and Syidah Matteen v. State of North Carolina
- Decided: January 16, 2007
- Citations: 181 N.C. App. 430; 639 S.E.2d 136

Court membership
- Judges sitting: John C. Martin, Rick Elmore, Barbara Jackson

Case opinions
- Decision by: Martin

American Civil Liberties Union of North Carolina & Syidah Mateen v. State of North Carolina, 181 N.C. App. 430, 639 S.E.2d 136 (2007), was a court case in the state of North Carolina within the United States of America. One of the main plaintiffs was Syidah Mateen an American-Muslim of Greensboro, North Carolina. She and the North Carolina chapter of the American Civil Liberties Union called for the state courts of North Carolina to rule that it is acceptable under the laws of the state for non-Christians to swear on religious texts of their own faith rather than the Bible of Christianity.

== Mateen as witness in 2003 ==
In 2003 Syidah Mateen (a computer analyst for radiology clinics, born in 1964) was a witness set to testify in a domestic violence protective order hearing, before Guilford District Judge Tom Jarrell. When asked to swear on a King James Version of the Bible, Mateen, a lifelong Muslim, asked "Do you have a Qur'an available?" Mateen recalled later that she "was actually shocked that they didn't have any".

North Carolina's state law "allows witnesses preparing to testify in court to take their oath in three ways: by laying a hand over 'the Holy Scriptures', by saying 'so help me God' without the use of a religious book, or by an affirmation using no religious symbols".

When told that there was no Qur'an in the courthouse Mateen's testimony was allowed after she agreed to affirm that she would be truthful.

While Mateen claims that Judge Jarrell told her that "all the courtrooms needed copies of the Quran", Jarrell maintains he told her only that "he would look into the legality of such oaths if she wanted to bring a Quran in the future".

== Attempted donation rebuffed ==
Mateen's parents had converted to Islam in the early 1960s while living in Flint, Michigan. After moving to North Carolina, her father, L'Fatihah Mateen, established the Al-Ummil Ummat Islamic Center in Greensboro and served as its prayer leader (he died in 1997). In 2005 Syidah Mateen, not realizing that the lack of a Qur'an for oaths at the courthouse might be mandated by law, joined with other Muslim-American's at the Al-Ummil Ummat Islamic Center "to donate copies of the Qur'an to Guilford County's two courthouses". The Center's imam, Charles Abdullah "working through a judicial assistant, was prepared to hand over the Qurans", but two Guilford judges declined to accept the texts, saying "an oath on the Qur'an is not a legal oath under state law".

In Raleigh, the lawyer for North Carolina's Administrative Office of the Courts (AOC) issued a preliminary opinion that said "that state law allows people to be sworn in using a Quran rather than a Bible". This was refuted by Guilford County's Senior Resident Superior Court Judge W. Douglas Albright who sets policy for the county's nine Superior Court courtrooms. Judge Albright stated flatly "An oath on the Quran is not a lawful oath under our law." He maintained that the statute means the Bible and that if that is to be changed it is up to the North Carolina Legislature, "It's gotten way out there: They've got everything from the Book of Mormon to the Book of Wicca on the list. Our position is that the statute governs not only the type of oath, but the manner and administration of the oath, and that it's now a legislative matter to straighten out."

Guilford Chief District Judge Joseph E. Turner "told [Imam] Abdullah that he could not accept the Qurans for the courtrooms". After the Judges' statements the AOC's spokesman Dick Ellis said "We are not aware of any courtroom that has ever allowed anybody to swear on anything but the Bible." Judge Jarrell the presiding officer in the case where Mateen testified did not make any comment but "deferred any decision to the judges that set courtroom policy". Judge Turner did ask Imam Abdullah to "donate a copy of the Quran to the law libraries in the county's two courthouses" which the imam did.

In an interview with reporters on the matter Mateen stated "This is a diverse world, and everybody does not worship or believe the same. We'll just have to get in touch with the right people and determine our next move." It was added that Mateen "worries that people might consider her testimony less credible if they see her unwilling to swear on a holy text".

== State law at issue ==
North Carolina's oath-taking practices "date to 1777 but have evolved over the years". North Carolina's legislature first passed the oath-taking statutes in 1777. At that time, the title of the statute was "Administration of oath upon the Gospels". In 1985 the word "Gospels" was replaced by the term "Holy Scriptures".

Currently the North Carolina General statute on oath taking (§11-2) states: (emphasis added) "Judges and other persons who may be empowered to administer oaths, shall (except in the cases in this Chapter excepted) require the party to be sworn to lay his hand upon the Holy Scriptures, in token of his engagement to speak the truth and in further token that, if he should swerve from the truth, he may be justly deprived of all the blessings of the holy book and made liable to that vengeance which he has imprecated on his own head."

Prior to 1985 amendments to N.C.G.S. § 11-2, the statutory section read that Judges shall "require the party sworn to lay his hand upon the Holy Evangelists of Almighty God".

== CAIR's comments ==
When it was announced that the Qur'an was not to be allowed for swearing before testimony, the Council on American-Islamic Relations (CAIR) issued a press statement, "By stating that only one book qualifies as 'Holy Scriptures', the court may be making an inappropriate endorsement of a single set of religious beliefs. Eliminating the opportunity to swear an oath on one's own holy text may also have the effect of diminishing the credibility of that person's testimony." CAIR's Legal Director Arsalan Iftikhar said "CAIR will offer a free copy of the Quran to any judge in North Carolina or throughout the United States for use in oaths or for personal awareness of the holy text." CAIR's Legal Director in Washington D.C, Arsalan Iftikhar, said of the case, "This shows there's a lot of anti-Muslim sentiment, especially here in the United States."

== Interfaith support for allowing Qur'an oaths ==
On July 6, 2005, a group of more than 20 religious leaders from the Guilford County area, "including those of Christian, Jewish and Buddhist faiths", sent a letter to Superior Court Judge W. Douglas Albright, who said an oath on the Quran is not lawful. The letter noted that "North Carolina is an increasingly diverse place and says that religious differences need to be respected." It went on to say "In North Carolina, we continue to be people who take our religious beliefs and practices very seriously. But we no longer live in the Bible Belt. Today, we live in the Bible-Talmud-Qur'an-Veda-Dhammapada-Guru Granth Sahib-Kitabi Iqan Belt. It is imperative for our civic leaders, school teachers, judges, and law enforcers to appreciate and respect the religious differences found in our population." The executive director of FaithAction (an interfaith organization) Rev. Mark Sills, signed the letter and said that the Qur'an oath case "struck us as an issue that needs to be confronted". He asked Christians to imagine what it would be like to live in a place where the Bible was not allowed for oaths, saying "That just feels like a slap in the face." Rev. Julie Peeples, pastor of Greensboro's Congregational United Church of Christ, signed the letter and said "I think it's an opportunity to foster greater respect for all the traditions we have in Greensboro." The superintendent of the Greensboro District of the United Methodist Church, Rev. Frank Stith, said "it makes sense for people to be able to use a book that means something to them", explaining "The point is to have something that stands behind someone's word."

== ACLU involvement ==
The North Carolina chapter of the American Civil Liberties Union became involved when on June 28, 2005 they called on the AOC to "adopt a policy allowing the use of the Quran and other religious texts for the swearing of oaths in court proceedings". When on July 14, 2005 the state Administrative Office of the Courts declined to intervene (indicating "that either the legislature or a court ruling would have to decide this question") the ACLU took the issue to court. In July 2005 they argued in court that "the term 'Holy Scriptures' appearing in the statute refers not only to the Christian Bible, but also to other religious texts including, but not limited to, the Quran, the Old Testament, and the Bhagavad-Gita". The ACLU argued that since in 1985 "the term 'Gospels' was eliminated from the section [on oaths] and the term 'Holy Evangelists of Almighty God' was changed to 'Holy Scriptures', the message sent by the Legislature was clear: no longer would the Christian Bible be the only religious text which could be used in a swearing ceremony. Stated differently, the term 'Holy Scriptures' is broad enough to include the Quran." The state attorney general's office argued in court papers that the ACLU lacked the right to sue because there is no controversy between them and the state of North Carolina. This led them to add Muslim Syidah Mateen as a plaintiff on November 29, 2005.

== Christian social conservative groups respond ==
Michele Combs, communications director of the Christian Coalition said "We don't have a state-run religion in this country and it's an honor to worship here, but some traditions that we've had for 200 years need to stay."

Erik Stanley, a lawyer for the Christian law group Liberty Counsel claimed the suit "was not simply intended to include other faiths". He went on to say: "The ACLU is not attempting to bring accommodation. That already exists. They're trying to erase history. Courtroom oaths have always been done on the Bible."

== December 2005 ruling ==
On December 5, 2005, Superior Court Judge Donald L. Smith (serving as an emergency judge) heard arguments on the case in a hearing that lasted less than half an hour. Lawyers on both sides were given seven and one-half minutes to make their case and no witnesses were heard. Assistant Attorney General Grady L. Balentine Jr. argued "that state oath-taking law is constitutional because it allows people to affirm if they don't wish to swear on the Christian Bible. No one is required to do that, that's our only position in this case." The ACLU's attorney Seth Cohen argued that if "Holy Scriptures" is interpreted to not include non-Christian texts, then the law is unconstitutional, as "the exclusive use of the Christian Bible for courtroom oaths violates the First Amendment's Establishment Clause in the U.S. Constitution". Both lawyers answered one of the Judge's questions by agreeing to "a longstanding legal tradition: When a law is susceptible to multiple interpretations, a judge should always rely on the interpretation that makes the law constitutional."

In his ruling Judge Smith dismissed Mateen's case, in part "because Mateen was able to testify that day, no legal controversy remained". Judge Smith "did not address whether state law allows people to use non-Christian texts for oath-taking, the main issue the ACLU wanted resolved". The executive director of the North Carolina chapter of the ACLU, Jennifer Rudinger, said "it would be very difficult for a person wishing to swear on a non-Christian text to halt a courtroom proceeding to pursue a legal challenge on the issue". Mateen said "Had I known that it would be taken to this point, I wouldn't have affirmed. I could have postponed everything until they got some Qurans." The ACLU was also surprised that Judge Smith cited "lack of an actual controversy" as a reason for dismissal because Grady Balentine, the lawyer for the state attorney general's office, did not make that argument. Balentine had only argued "that the law gives people another option if they don't wish to swear on the Christian Bible".

On December 15, 2005, a week after Smith's ruling, the North Carolina chapter of the ACLU announced they would appeal the decision. Their lawyer Seth Cohen told reporters "that the organization disagrees with the judge's finding" and that he was "confident they will win in the N.C. Court of Appeals". Cohen went on to say: "It's a shame that this matter cannot be resolved sooner. All we have ever asked is that people of all faiths be able to put their hands on the holy text of their choice. It's that simple. We don't understand why this is such a big deal." Cohen also said that members of Judaism have thrown their support behind the case as they would like to be able to swear on the Tanakh, and that this joining over the issue was one of the things "that's gotten lost in this case".

== Appeals Court ruling ==
On January 16, 2007, a three-judge panel of the North Carolina Court of Appeals ruled unanimously to reverse the trial court decision that had dismissed the case. The appeals court found that the issue was not moot. The Court's ruling also mentioned it received "affidavits from eight Jewish members of ACLU-NC who were residents of Guilford County and eligible for jury duty, stating they would prefer to swear on the Hebrew Bible rather than the Christian Bible if selected as jurors or asked to testify in court".

The Court reviewed the history of the case, noting that "When Ms. Mateen appeared as a witness, she requested that her oath to tell the truth be sworn on the holy text of her religious faith, the Quran. When her request was denied and because she would not swear on the Christian Bible, her options were to affirm without the use of a religious text or be denied the opportunity to testify. ... Ms. Mateen chose to affirm to tell the truth, and she now seeks a declaratory judgment determining whether, under N.C.G.S. § 11-2, she has the right to swear on her holy text, the Quran."

The Court held that the case should go forward, because without a court decision on the matter a conflict was unavoidable, saying "Under these circumstances, Ms. Mateen clearly demonstrated her intent to avail herself of her asserted right to swear on her religious text and her intent to litigate that right. The State has clearly demonstrated, by its refusal to permit witnesses to swear on any text other than the Christian Bible, its intent to continue the course of action; thus, its actions are not speculative [which would not merit allowing the case to go forward]. ... ACLU-NC argues that it is not a matter of 'if' one of its [8,000] members who would prefer to swear on a different religious text will be called to serve as a juror or witness, but rather it is a matter of 'when'. We agree."

The court stressed that it was only calling for the case to go forward, and was not itself judging the cases merits, saying "The sole issue presented by this appeal is whether either plaintiff has presented a justiciable controversy in their complaint. We conclude the complaint is sufficient to entitle both plaintiffs to litigate their claims under the Declaratory Judgment Act, though we are careful to express no opinion on the merits of those claims."

Seth Cohen, General Counsel for the N.C. ACLU stated: "We are very happy with the Court of Appeals' decision today. This is an important issue that affects thousands of people of faith across North Carolina who are not of the Christian faith, and we look forward to a hearing on the Constitutional questions raised by this case."

Mateen repeated her position in an interview after the Appeals Court allowed the case to go forward, saying she always "felt like, in this day and time, that they would at least have the three major religious texts in the courtroom. If it was a Quran in the courtroom and a Christian was in there, would they want to testify on a holy Quran?"

== Attorney General's review ==
The ACLU reports on its website that "The state Attorney General has 30 days [from the January 16, 2007 ruling] to decide whether to seek discretionary review by the North Carolina Supreme Court. If the North Carolina Supreme Court does not review the ruling by the Court of Appeals, then the case will go back to the superior court for a review of the Constitutional challenge to the statute."

Noelle Talley spokeswoman for the state Attorney General confirmed that the office is "reviewing the ruling but hasn't decided about an appeal".

== Superior Court ==
On May 24, 2007, Superior Court Judge Paul Ridgeway ruled that people of non-Christian faiths must be allowed to use religious texts other than the Christian Bible when being sworn in as jurors or witnesses in state court proceedings. Though the state had 30 days to decide to appeal the ruling, it took no action.

== Views on the case ==
Some have seen this matter "as the latest case of religious liberty to arise in North Carolina. In other cases, employers have been challenged to allow Sikhs to keep their beards and Muslim women to wear veils." University of North Carolina at Chapel Hill's Professor of Religion, Thomas Tweed said "This North Carolina case is another example of the ways America's expanding religious diversity is coming into conflict with established practices in the public arena."

New York University law professor Noah Feldman said "This case is a cousin to the Ten Commandments case in Alabama, where a judge does something that's pretty obviously unconstitutional, with a goal of sending a message ... that he's for fundamental religious values."

The Christian Science Monitor noted that in contrast to Judge Albright most American judges in recent history "have apparently given other oaths wide latitude. In a federal terrorism case in 1997 in Washington D.C., for instance, the judge allowed Muslim witnesses to swear to Allah. And the practice isn't new: Mochitsura Hashimoto, the Japanese submarine commander who testified in the court martial of a US Navy captain in 1945, was allowed by a military tribunal to swear on his beliefs of Shinto, the ancient religion of Japan."

The Christian Science Monitor also quoted Manish Vij, a New York blogger for Sepia Mutiny who said, "The only thing more compelling [to] ... South Asian Muslims is to literally swear upon your mother's head, and mothers aren't as convenient to drag around in court as a copy of the Koran."

== Comparison to controversy in the US Congress ==
Many media accounts have linked this story with Qur'an oath controversy of the 110th United States Congress that involved Representative Keith Ellison of Minnesota, the first Muslim elected to the US Congress. Ellison's desire to use a Qur'an at the ceremonial reenactment of his oath, while symbolically important, was never a judicial issue. The swearing-in was en masse and involved no texts whatsoever. Both of the main figures taking issue with Ellison, Dennis Prager and US Representative Virgil Goode of Virginia, made sure to clarify that they were not asking for him to be banned from serving if he insisted on using a Qur'an instead of a Bible at his reenactment photo-op. In this regard the Mateen case is far more significant.

One commentator laid out the likely outcome should the Mateen case not be judged on its merits, saying one day a non-Christian would appear before a North Carolina judge and would "create an impasse in court when he refuses to swear on the Bible and declines to affirm an oath, insisting he should be allowed to place his hand on the Quran or some other holy book and promise before his God to tell the truth". The judge could then "hold the uncooperative witness in contempt, in effect punishing a person who simply asks that his religious beliefs be granted the same respect as those of a Christian. ... [and] While holding the witness in contempt, the judge also could bar the testimony that would have been offered—thereby jeopardizing the case of one party or the other. ...Or the judge could let the witness testify without swearing or affirming to tell the truth. But that would invite a challenge to the validity of the testimony—another legal controversy."

== See also ==
- Yacovelli v. Moeser
