= Politics of the Maldives =

Politics of the Maldives ދިވެހިރާއްޖޭގެ ސިޔާސަތު
- Emblem of Maldives
- Polity type: Unitary presidential constitutional republic
- Constitution: Constitution of Maldives

Legislative branch
- Name: People's Majlis
- Type: Unicameral
- Presiding officer: Abdul Raheem Abdulla

Executive branch
- Head of state and government
- Title: President
- Currently: Mohamed Muizzu
- Appointer: Direct popular vote
- Cabinet
- Name: Cabinet of the Maldives
- Leader: President
- Deputy leader: Vice-president
- Appointer: President

Judicial branch
- Name: Judiciary in the Maldives
- Chief judge: Abdul Ghanee Mohamed

The politics of the Maldives take place in the framework of a presidential representative democratic republic, whereby the President is the Head of Government. Executive power is exercised by the government. The President heads the executive branch and appoints the Cabinet; like many presidential democracies, each member of the cabinet need to be approved by the Parliament. The President, along with their pick for vice-president, is directly elected by the denizens to a five-year term by a secret ballot. Once in office, they could be re-elected to a second 5-year term, which is the limit allowed by the Constitution. The current President of the Maldives is Mohamed Muizzu, when his predecessor, Ibrahim Mohamed Solih lost the 2023 Maldivian presidential election.

The unicameral Majlis of the Maldives is composed of 93 members serving a five-year term. The total number of the members representing each constituency depends on the total population of that constituency. The last parliamentary election was held on 21 April 2024.

The Maldivian legal system is derived mainly from the traditional Islamic law. There is a Supreme Court with 5 judges including the Chief Justice. The Chief Justice is appointed by the President, with the recommendation of the Judicial Service Commission. Parliament is required to approve the appointment before he assumes office. Excluding the Supreme Court, there also exists the High Court (two branches), a Criminal Court, Civil Court, Family Court, Juvenile Court, Drug Court and many Lower Courts in each Atoll/Island. An Attorney General is part of the Cabinet and also needs the approval of Parliament before taking office.

Under the new 2008 constitution, the function of Local Government is devolved to an Atoll Council to administer each atoll and an Island Council to administer each inhabited island. Island councillors are elected by the people of each island, and the Atoll Councilors are in turn elected by the Island Councilors.

The Constitution of the Maldives requires the following for a president: be a Maldivian citizen born to parents who are Maldivian citizens, and who is not also a citizen of a foreign country; be a Muslim and a follower of a Sunni school of Islam;

Maldives was 2023 the 9th most electoral democratic country in Asia according to V-Dem Democracy indices.

== History ==
A 1968 referendum approved a constitution making Maldives a republic with executive, legislative, and judicial branches of government. The constitution was amended in 1970, 1972, 1975, and 1997 and again in 2008.

Ibrahim Nasir, Prime Minister under the pre-1968 sultanate, became president and held office from 1968 to 1978. He was succeeded by Maumoon Abdul Gayoom, who was elected president in 1978 and re-elected in 1983, 1988, 1993, 1998, and 2003. At the end of his presidency in 2008, he was the longest serving leader in Asia.

Since 2003, following the death in custody of a prisoner, Naseem, the Maldives experienced several anti-government demonstrations calling for political reforms, more freedoms, and an end to torture and oppression. As a result of these activities, political parties were eventually allowed in June 2005. The main parties registered in Maldives are: the Maldivian Democratic Party (MDP), the Dhivehi Raiyyithunge Party (DRP), the Islamic Democratic Party (IDP) and the Adhaalath Party. The first party to register was the MDP headed by popular opposition figures such as Mohamed Nasheed (Anni) and Mohamed Latheef (Gogo). The next was the Dhivehi Rayyithunge Party (DRP) headed by then-President Gayoom.

A new Constitution was ratified in August 2008, paving the way for the country's first multi-party presidential election two months later.

The Maldives have scored poorly on some indices of freedom. The "Freedom in the World" index, a measure of political rights and civil liberties published by Freedom House, judged Maldives as "not free" until May 1, 2009, when it was raised to "partly free". The "Worldwide Press Freedom Index", published by Reporters Without Borders, ranks Maldives 106 out of 180 in terms of press freedom as of 2024.

On 30 September 2023, PNC/PPM candidate Mohamed Muizzu won the 2023 Maldives presidential election, beating incumbent president Ibrahim Solih with 54% of the vote. On 17 October 2023, Mohamed Muizzu was sworn in as the eighth President of the Republic of Maldives.

In April 2024, President Mohamed Muizzu's pro-China People's National Congress (PNC) won 66 seats in the 2024 Maldivian parliamentary election, while its allies took nine, giving the president the backing of 75 legislators in the 93-member house, meaning a super-majority and enough to change the constitution.

== Executive branch ==
The Cabinet of the Maldives presided by the President, contains the vice-president and ministers. there are currently 19 ministers that lead their respective ministries, they are:

- Minister of Defence
- Minister of Foreign Affairs
- Minister of Homeland Security and Technology
- Minister of Finance and Planning
- Minister of Education
- Minister of Health
- Minister of Economic Development and Trade
- Minister of Fisheries and Ocean Resources
- Attorney General
- Minister of Islamic Affairs
- Minister of Tourism and Environment
- Minister of Social and Family Development
- Minister of Sports, Fitness and Recreation
- Minister of Transport and Civil Aviation
- Minister of Dhivehi Language, Culture and Heritage
- Minister of Higher Education, Labour and Skills Development
- Minister of Construction, Housing and Infrastructure
- Minister of Agriculture and Animal Welfare
- Minister of Youth Empowerment, Information and Arts
- Minister of Cities, Local Government and Public Works

== Legislative branch ==
The People's Majlis has 93 members elected by the people under first-past-the-post voting.

== Political parties and elections ==
On a national level, Maldives elects a head of state – the president – and a legislature. The president is elected for a five-year term by the people since 2008. Until 2005 (after the election), no legal parties existed. Prior to June 2005, the Maldivian political system was based on the election of individuals, rather than the more common system of election according to party platform. In June 2005, as part of an ongoing programme of democratic reform, new regulations were promulgated to formally recognised political parties within the framework of the electoral system.

The Maldivian Democratic Party was already active. New parties created within a few years after this included those such as the Dhivehi Rayyithunge Party, the Jumhooree Party, and the Adhaalath Party.

There are now 7 registered political parties in the Maldives:

Party	Registered Date
Maldivian Democratic Party (MDP)	26 June 2005
Adhaalath Party (AP)	18 August 2005
Jumhooree Party (JP)	2 August 2008
Maldives Development Alliance (MDA)	30 December 2012
People's National Congress (PNC)	31 January 2019
Maldives National Party (MNP)	25 October 2021
People's National Front (PNF)	25 April 2024
Source: Elections Commission

On October 8, 2008, the country held its first ever multi-party presidential election.

In the 2019 parliamentary election, MDP won 65 seats in the 87 seat parliament. This was the first time a single party was able to get such a high number of seats in the parliament in Maldivian history.

In the 2024 parliamentary election, PNC won 66 seats in the 93 seat parliament, meanwhile MDP received 12.

== Judicial branch ==
The legal system is based on Islamic law with admixtures of English common law primarily in commercial matters. Maldives has not accepted compulsory International Court of Justice jurisdiction.

== Administrative divisions ==
20 atolls (atholhu, singular and plural): Alif Alif, Alif Dhaal, Baa, Dhaalu, Faafu, Gaafu Alifu, Gaafu Dhaalu, Gnaviyani, Haa Alifu, Haa Dhaalu, Laamu, Lhaviyani, Kaafu, Meemu, Noonu, Raa, Seenu, Shaviyani, Thaa, Vaavu, and one first-order administrative city (Malé).

== International organisation participation ==
The Maldives is a member of many international organisations, some of which include:

The ADB, Commonwealth of Nations, CP, ESCAP, FAO, G-77, IBRD, ICAO, IDA, IFAD, IFC, International Monetary Fund, IMO, Intelsat (nonsignatory user), Interpol, IOC, IsDB, ITU, NAM, OIC, OPCW, SAARC, UN, UNCTAD, UNESCO, UNIDO, UPU, World Health Organization, WCO, WIPO, WMO, and the WTO.
