= List of political parties in the Maldives =

Political parties in the Maldives were legalized when the Maldivian parliament voted unanimously for the creation of a multi-party system on 2 June 2005. This came after decades of authoritarian rule. Prior to this ruling, political parties had not been not allowed under the Maldivian legal system.

== Current parties ==
=== Parliamentary ===
Party		Leader	Founded	Ideology	MPs
PNC	People's National Congress ޕީޕަލްސް ނެޝެނަލް ކޮންގްރެސް	Mohamed Muizzu	2019	Islamic democracy; Social conservatism	75 / 93
MDP	Maldivian Democratic Party ދިވެހިރައްޔިތުންގެ ޑިމޮކްރެޓިކް ޕާޓީ Dhivehi rayyitunge dimokretik paatee	Abdulla Shahid	2005	Liberal conservatism; Islamic democracy	12 / 93
MDA	Maldives Development Alliance މޯލްޑިވްސް ޑިވެލޮޕްމަންޓް އެލަޔަންސް	Ahmed Siyam Mohamed	2012	Economic liberalism; Political Islam	2 / 93
JP	Republican Party ޖުމްހޫރީ ޕާޓީ Jumhooree paatee	Qasim Ibrahim	2008	Islamic democracy; Nationalism; Social conservatism	1 / 93
MNP	Maldives National Party މޯލްޑިވްސް ނޭޝަނަލް ޕާޓީ	Mohamed Nazim	2021	Islamic democracy; Nationalism	1 / 93

=== Extra-parliamentary ===
Party		Leader	Founded	Ideology
AP	Justice Party ޢަދާލަތު ޕާޓީ Adhaalath pati	Sheikh Imran Abdulla	2005	Religious conservatism; Islamism; Islamic democracy
PNF	People's National Front ޕީޕަލްސް ނެޝެނަލް ފްރޮންޓް	Abdulla Yameen	2023	Social conservatism; Right-wing populism; Islamism

== Dissolved parties ==
=== Political Party Bill ===
On 12 March 2013, president Mohamed Waheed Hassan ratified a new Political Party Bill replacing the guidelines established in 2005, when the Maldives first became a multi-party system. The bill raised the minimum number of members required to register a political party from 3,000 to 10,000. With the ratification of the bill, all registered political parties with less than 10,000 members were dissolved. The following is a list of parties dissolved under the law:

Party		Leader (Note: At time of dissolution.)	Founded	Dissolved	Ideology
PA	People's Alliance ޕީޕަލްސް އެލަޔަންސް	Ahmed Nazim	2008	2013	
DQP	Dhivehi Qaumee Party ދިވެހި ޤައުމީ ޕާޓީ	Hassan Saeed	2009	2013	
GIP	National Unity Party ޤައުމީ އިއްތިޚާދު Gaumee itthihaad	Mohamed Waheed Hassan	2008	2013	Social democracy; Environmentalism
IDP	Islamic Democratic Party އިސްލާމިކް ޑިމޮކްރެޓިކް ޕާޓީ	Hassan Zareer	2005	2013	Islamism; Islamic democracy
MSDP	Maldives Social Democratic Party ދިވެހިރައްޔިތުންގެ ސޯޝަލް ޑިމޮކްރެޓިކް ޕާޓީ	Reeko Ibrahim Manik	2006	2013	
PP	People's Party ޕީޕަލްސް ޕާޓީ	Ahmed Riyaz	2007	2013	
MNC	Maldives National Congress މޯލްޑިވިއަން ނެޝަނަލް ކޮންގްރެސް	Ali Amjad (Deputy)	2007	2013	
SLP	Social Liberal Party ސޯޝަލް ލިބަރަލް ޕާޓީ	Mazlaan Rasheed	2007	2013	Social liberalism
MLP	Maldivian Labour Party މޯލްޑިވިއަން ލޭބަރ ޕާޓީ	Ahmed Moosa (Deputy)	2008	2013	Socialism
MRM	Maldives Reform Movement މޯލްޑިވްސް ރިފޯމް މޫވްމަންޓް	Mohamed Munnavaru	2011	2013	
DRP	Maldivian People's Party ދިވެހި ރައްޔިތުންގެ ޕާޓީ Dhivehi rayyithunge paatee	Abdulla Jabir	2005	2023	Conservatism; Populism; Islamic democracy
MRM	Maldives Reform Movement މޯލްޑިވްސް ރިފޯމް މޫވްމެންޓް	Maumoon Abdul Gayoom	2019	2025	Political Islam; Nationalism
MTD	Maldives Third Way Democrats މޯލްޑިވްސް ތަރޑް ވޭ ޑިމޮކެރެޓްސް	Ahmed Adeeb	2018	2025	Third Way
PPM	Progressive Party of Maldives ޕްރޮގްރެސިވް ޕާޓީ އޮފް މޯލްޑިވްސް	Mohamed Muizzu	2011	2025	Religious nationalism; Right-wing populism
DEMS	The Democrats ދަ ޑިމޮކްރެޓްސް	Imthiyaz Fahmy	2023	2025	Liberal conservatism; Parliamentarism
MLSDP	Maldives Labour and Social Democratic Party މޯލްޑިވްސް ލޭބަރ އެންޑް ސޯޝަލް ޑިމޮކްރެޓިކް ޕާޓީ	Ahmed Shiham	2019	2025	Social democracy

=== First republic ===
The First Republic of the Maldives had only one party, the Rayyithunge Muthagaddim Party.

Party		Leader	Founded	Dissolved	Ideology
RMP	Rayyithunge Muthagaddim Party ރައްޔިތުންގެ މުތައްގަދިމް ޕާޓީ	Mohamed Amin Didi	1951	1954	Nationalism; Republicanism

== See also ==
- Politics of the Maldives
- List of political parties by country
