= Jennifer Latheef =

Maldivian human rights defender, photojournalist, and democracy campaigner

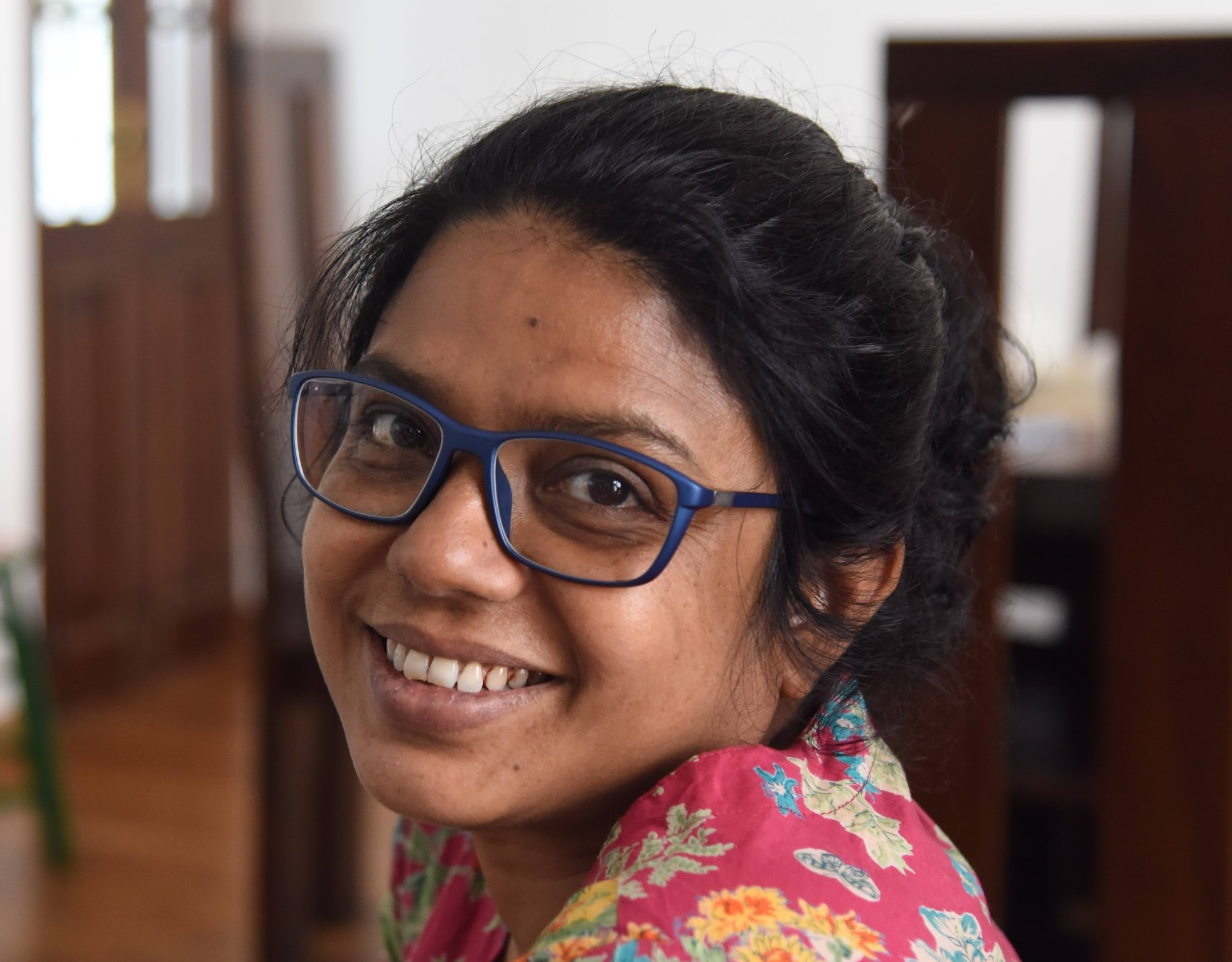
- Jennifer Latheef, 2017
- Born: Malé, Maldives
- Education: University of San Francisco (B.A. Mass Media); Overseas School of Colombo (International Baccalaureate)
- Occupations: Photojournalist, human-rights activist, democracy campaigner
- Organization: Maldivian Democratic Party
- Known for: Peaceful pro-democracy activism; Amnesty International prisoner of conscience (2004–2006)
- Parent(s): Mohamed Latheef; Wafiyya Najeeb
- Relatives: Marnie Latheef (sister); Ahmed Latheef (brother)

Jennifer Latheef (born in Malé, Maldives) is a Maldivian photojournalist, human-rights activist, and democracy campaigner. Her arrest and 2005 conviction on terrorism charges for participating in pro-democracy protests drew international attention to political repression in the Maldives. The case became emblematic of the country's democratic reform movement. She was designated a prisoner of conscience by Amnesty International and was later pardoned in 2006—a pardon she initially refused to accept on principle. Latheef has since remained an active voice for civil liberties, press freedom, and human-rights reform.

== Early life and education ==
Latheef was born in Malé to Mohamed Latheef (co-founder of the Maldivian Democratic Party and prominent democracy campaigner) and Wafiyya Najeeb. Through her father’s side, she is the niece of Abdul Samad Abdulla, former Minister of Foreign Affairs of the Maldives, the granddaughter of Abdullah Katheeb, and the great-granddaughter of Hirihamaidhi Kaleyfaanu — both prominent merchants and civic leaders whose descendants were among Maldives' prominent reformist families.

She completed the International Baccalaureate (IB) programme at the Overseas School of Colombo in Sri Lanka and earned a bachelor’s degree in Mass Media from the University of San Francisco in the United States.

== Career and activism ==
Before her arrest Latheef worked as a photojournalist and documentary-maker focusing on social issues and freedom of expression. She served on the national council of the Maldivian Democratic Party (MDP). A 2005 interview in Minivan News captured her views on censorship and rights.

Latheef’s activism emerged during a period of intensifying calls for democratic reform in the Maldives. Her father, Mohamed Latheef, was among the co-founders of the Maldivian Democratic Party (MDP), which was formally established in exile in Sri Lanka in 2003. As the government cracked down on dissent following the custodial killing of Evan Naseem, Latheef documented protests and became one of several activists prosecuted under broad anti-terrorism laws. Her imprisonment and international recognition as a prisoner of conscience by Amnesty International helped draw global media attention to the Maldives’ human-rights situation. International observers have since cited her case as one of the early incidents that brought external focus to the democratic reform movement led by the MDP and other opposition figures.

== The 2003 protests and turning point ==
In September 2003, public anger erupted after Evan Naseem was beaten to death in custody at Maafushi Prison. Security forces then opened fire, killing additional inmates. Latheef joined and documented protests that became foundational to the Maldives’ democratic movement.

== Arrest and detention (2004–2005) ==
In late 2004 she was detained for over four months; Amnesty International designated her a prisoner of conscience, citing reported ill-treatment in custody. On 12 August 2005 she was arrested during a peaceful demonstration and later charged under anti-terrorism laws for allegedly inciting violence in the 2003 unrest — charges she denied.

== Trial, sentencing, and imprisonment ==
On 18 October 2005 the Criminal Court sentenced Latheef to ten years in prison on terrorism charges. The verdict was condemned by Amnesty International, the International Commission of Jurists (ICJ), and press-freedom organisations. While incarcerated in Maafushi Prison, Latheef reportedly faced deprivation of medical care and poor conditions. On 21 December 2005 she was granted a ten-day medical leave, after which she was placed under house arrest.

== International campaign ==
By December 2005 NGOs including RSF, Article 19, and Friends of Maldives rallied for her release. In April 2006, the ICJ renewed its call for her unconditional release. English PEN and Amnesty continued advocacy, and The Telegraph framed her case as central to the Maldives’ push for reform.

== House arrest and pardon ==
On 16 August 2006, President Maumoon Abdul Gayoom pardoned Latheef. Latheef refused to accept the pardon initially, as she was awaiting a High Court hearing to clear her name. She maintained that witnesses presented by the state were coached and lied under oath. She viewed a pardon as an admission of guilt and pressed for her co-defendants’ release. She later left the MDP after the party went against her wishes by including her name among those presented to President Gayoom for clemency. Afterwards, critics and legal observers called for her conviction to be vacated, not simply pardoned.

== Legal aftermath and blocked appeal ==
Though pardoned, her conviction remained. A 2008 U.S. Department of State report confirmed that the government blocked her appeal and did not vacate the conviction. The FIDH *Observatory for Human Rights Defenders* listed her case among emblematic instances of judicial harassment. An independent press-freedom assessment, *A Vibrant Media Under Pressure* (Article 19, 2006), also referenced her prosecution among restrictions on media.

== Legacy and continuing impact ==
Latheef’s case is widely cited in analyses of how anti-terror laws were used to suppress dissent in the Maldives. It is referenced by Amnesty, ICJ, RSF, English PEN, and academic observers as a watershed in civil liberties in the country. In *Freedom in the World 2006–2007*, she is named among key figures in the Maldives’ rights movement (cited via Freedom House in Refworld). Her case remains a symbol in press-freedom and transitional-justice discourse.

== See also ==
- Human rights in the Maldives
- Evan Naseem
- Maldivian Democratic Party
