= Hirihamaidhi Kaleygefaanu =

Maldivian teacher, merchant and civic leader (1901–1962)

- ހިރިހަމައިދި ކަލޭގެފާނު
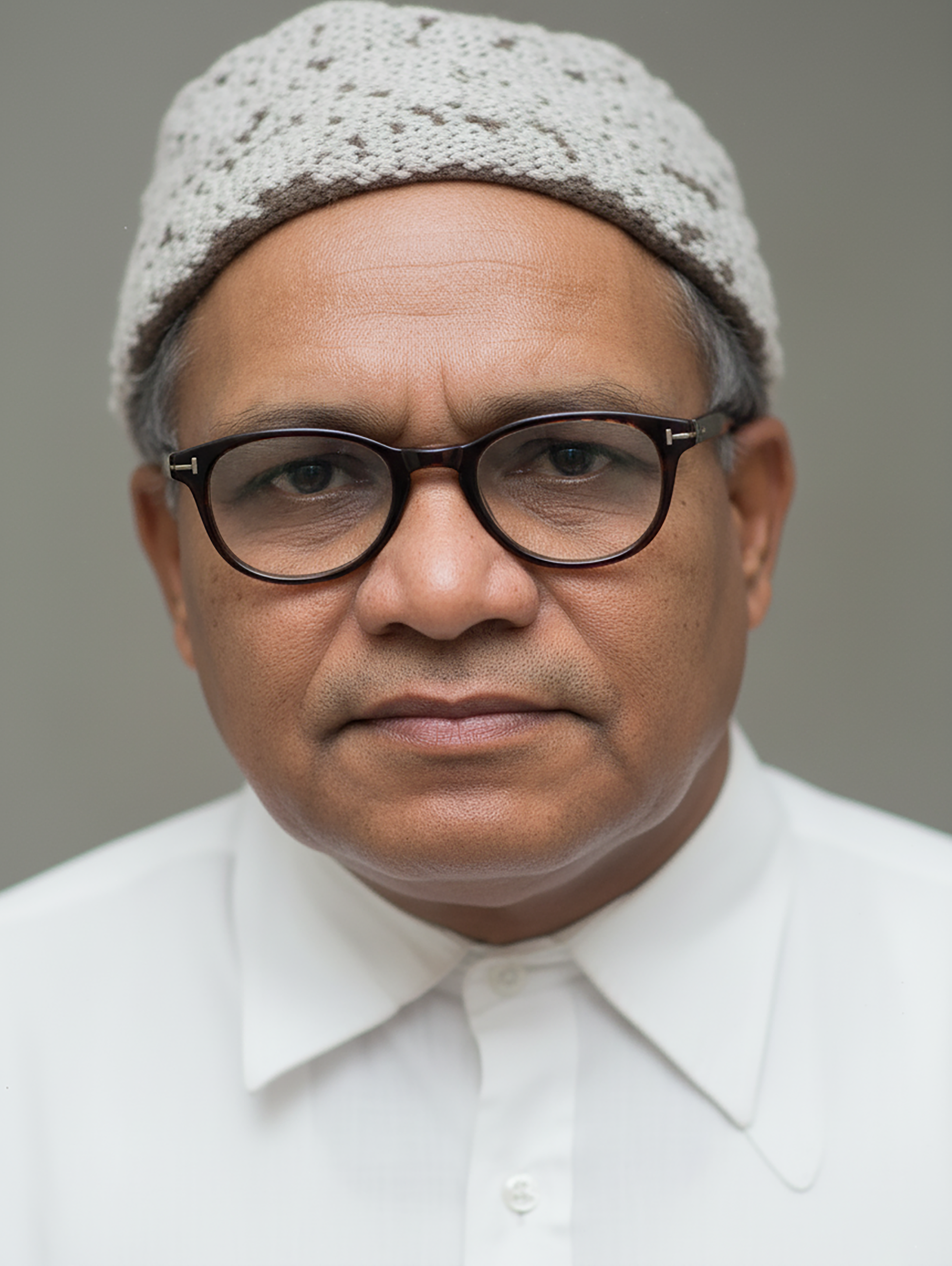
- Hirihamaidhi Kaleygefaanu (c. 1950s), photographed by Ali Najeeb; digitally restored and AI-reconstructed from the original black-and-white photograph (colorization and tonal enhancement).
- Born: Moosa Manikfaanu; 1901; Hulhudhoo, Addu Atoll, Maldive Islands
- Died: 1962 (aged 60–61)
- Occupations: Teacher; merchant; community leader
- Spouse: Aminath Abdurahman (Rekidhiye)
- Children: 7

Hirihamaidhi Kaleygefaanu (Dhivehi: ހިރިހަމައިދި ކަލޭގެފާނު; also spelt Hirihamaanthi, Hirihamaathi, and Kaleyfaanu; born Moosa Manikfaanu; 1901–1962) was a Maldivian teacher, merchant and civic leader from the southern atolls. Born in Hulhudhoo (Addu Atoll) and later based in Havaru Thinadhoo (Huvadhoo Atoll), he is described in multiple historical accounts, including Sandhaanu.today, Shafeega (2009), and Dhauru (2025), as a prominent civic and commercial leader in the Maldives’ mid-20th-century history.

He was among the last men to receive the traditional Kangathi title Hirihamaidhi Kaleygefaanu and is described in historical records as the wealthiest merchant in the Maldives during his time, commanding one of the largest private trading fleets in the country. As a leading Thinadhoo merchant, he played a pivotal role in the southern economy when privately owned odi ships sailed directly to Ceylon and India. Contemporary accounts describe Thinadhoo as the country's wealthiest trading hub, sustained by these independent maritime ventures that connected the atoll's merchants to regional markets. The prominence and prosperity of Addu and Huvadhoo trading families had long been viewed with resentment by mercantile elites in Malé.

He promoted literacy, commerce, and local governance. His arrest and death during the political purges of the early 1960s have been cited by historians and local sources as a defining moment in Thinadhoo's collective memory and pursuit of justice.

== Move to Thinadhoo and teaching career ==
Moosa Manikfaanu was born in 1901 in Maalimeege house, Hulhudhoo, Addu Atoll, to Ali Manikfaanu (Donrahaa) and Maryam Manikfaanu (Hajaamuge). He studied Qur’anic recitation, Arabic and arithmetic under local scholars. Genealogical records compiled by the National Centre for Linguistic and Historical Research and regional studies by Ahmed Nazeer confirm that the Maalimeege family was part of Addu's early merchant network with trade links to Ceylon. Scholarly overviews describe the Maldives as a crossroads of Indian Ocean routes, with inter-island shipping to Sri Lanka and South India. Additional historical papers trace his lineage to early southern trading households.

In the mid-1920s, Manikfaanu moved to Havaru Thinadhoo, Huvadhoo Atoll, where he began work as a teacher instructing students in the Qur’an, Arabic and arithmetic. The Sandhaanu article The Collective Punishment Inflicted on the People of Huvadhoo-Thinadhoo describes him as one of the island's earliest Ustaz, respected for his calm demeanour and learning. His pupils and neighbours called him Ustaz Moosa. He later married Aminath Abdurahman (Rekidhiye); their first son Abdullah Khatheeb was born in 1927.

== Mercantile prominence ==
Having settled permanently in Thinadhoo, Manikfaanu gradually shifted from teaching to commerce. By the 1940s, he had become one of the southern atolls' leading traders, operating large sailing vessels between the Maldives and Ceylon, exporting dried fish and importing rice, flour, textiles, and building materials. Local accounts, including Sandhaanu.today (2022) and Dhauru (2025), describe him as generous, noting that he often extended interest-free loans to smaller merchants and families in need. According to community sources, his home became a local hub for both gatherings and learning, and he was regarded locally as Thinadhoo's principal private financier and civic patron.

== National contribution and famine relief ==
In the late 1940s, when Maldivian government debts to Ceylonese suppliers disrupted imports of rice and grain, Manikfaanu and his eldest son Abdullah Khatheeb used their own credit and capital to repay the outstanding balances in Colombo. Their intervention reopened food-supply routes, preventing famine during the administration of Mohamed Amin Didi.

In recognition of this service, Manikfaanu was conferred the Kangathi title Hirihamaidhi Kaleygefaanu, as confirmed by R. Majid's genealogical documentation on the Maldives Royal Family website. Local coverage also records Hirihamaidhi's name among recipients of the title in the late 1940s. Contemporary sources explain why the island came to be referred to as Havaru Thinadhoo, citing the extraordinary tributes paid to Malé’s havarus and naming Hirihamaidhi as the last wealthy patron who presided over the process. Contemporary accounts refer to him as “a benefactor of successive governments, even lending to the state in times of hardship.”

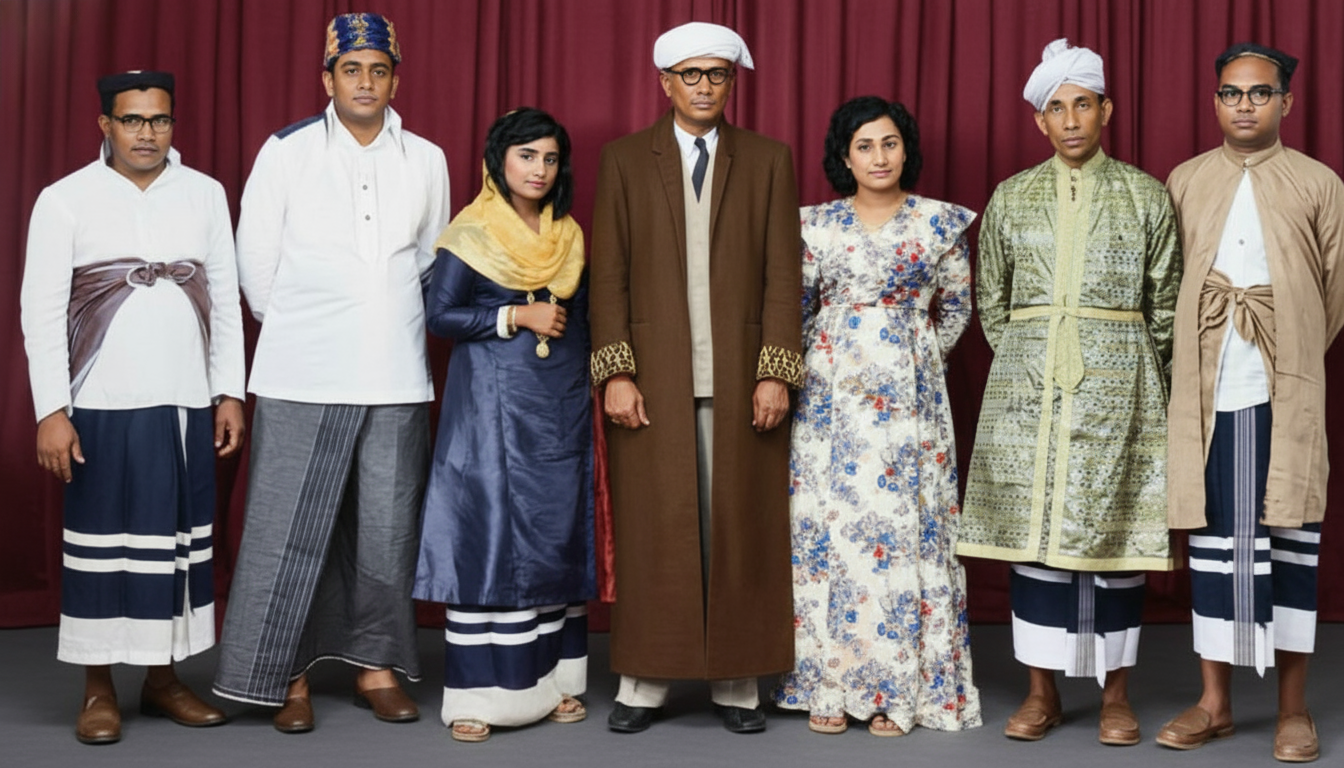
Hirihamaidhi Kaleygefaanu with the Maldivian delegation to greet Queen Elizabeth II during her 1954 state visit to Ceylon; digitally restored and colorized from the original black-and-white photograph.

== Political persecution and death (1962) ==
=== Background ===
According to the Sandhaanu publication The Collective Punishment Inflicted on the People of Huvadhoo-Thinadhoo, President Ibrahim Nasir's antagonism toward Manikfaanu pre-dated the 1962 military operation. The article states that Nasir viewed Manikfaanu and his family as too wealthy, powerful, and politically influential, and therefore as a potential threat to his authority — a perception further aggravated by Manikfaanu's refusal to align himself with Nasir, whom he believed to have been implicated in the death of Mohamed Amin Didi, his former ally and friend. Political scientist Renée Jeffery (2024) corroborates these accounts in transitional-justice research. The same source records that Manikfaanu had no involvement in the southern rebellions and that his targeting formed part of a broader effort to dismantle Thinadhoo's merchant elite and autonomous civic leadership.

=== Testimonies and accounts ===
Further testimony is provided by Mohamed Hameed of Thinadhoo and his associates, who together led the efforts to have Thinadhoo rejoin the United Suvadive Republic in 1961, following the island's first assault by Nasir in 1959 when he arrived on the gunboat Maldives Star. In a series of recorded video interviews from September 2011, later made publicly available, Hameed and others stated that Manikfaanu and his son Abdullah Khatheeb were uninvolved in the uprising and had actively tried to prevent it. Their accounts align with southern oral histories portraying Manikfaanu as a civic leader who valued reconciliation and stability over rebellion.

=== Arrest and imprisonment ===
When President Ibrahim Nasir ordered the 1962 operation that razed Havaru Thinadhoo and expelled its population, Moosa Manikfaanu was abroad in Saudi Arabia. On returning several weeks later, he was arrested together with members of his family. Their property and vessels were destroyed, looted, and confiscated during the attack and depopulation of Havaru Thinadhoo, without any judicial process or trial. Manikfaanu and two of his sons — Abdullah Khatheeb and Saeed Khatheeb — later died while imprisoned in Malé. Multiple oral testimonies from surviving detainees report harsh prison conditions, physical abuse, and inadequate food and medical care, and several historians and southern writers have characterised their deaths as the result of torture and mistreatment. No official investigation or record of these deaths was ever released.

The 2024 peer-reviewed analysis by Renée Jeffery cites the Thinadhoo operation and its aftermath as key examples of state violence addressed by the OTJ, emphasising the persistence of impunity for historical abuses in the Maldives.

== Collective punishment ==
The rest of the Hirihamaidhi family — along with nearly all of Thinadhoo's residents — was forcibly banished by Nasir's government to remote northern atolls and to Goidhoo (Baa Atoll) and Kudarikilu in Baa Atoll. Women, children, and men alike endured years of displacement, hardship, and separation.

In March 2022, the Office of the Ombudsperson for Transitional Justice (OTJ) began public hearings into the 1962 depopulation, accepting it as a case of national importance and gathering testimonies from survivors about forced displacement, loss of property, and the long-term social impact of banishment.

According to transitional-justice scholar Renée Jeffery, the Thinadhoo case illustrates the enduring legacy of “collective punishment” in Maldivian political history and remains central to understanding the country's transitional justice process.

Eyewitnesses featured in the Thinadhoo Depopulation — Maldives Files: Without a Trial oral-history video series recount the same experiences of forced dislocation, imprisonment, torture, and years of exile, offering first-hand testimony of the island's destruction and its human cost.

== Personal life ==
Manikfaanu and his wife Aminath Abdurahman (Rekidhiye) had seven children: Abdulla Moosa (Abdulla Katheeb), Hawwa Manike, Fathima Manike, Abdul Mughnee, Saeed Moosa (Saeed Katheeb), Aminath Nafeesa, and Abdul Muhusin. He was known locally for teaching Qur'anic studies to neighbourhood children. Those who knew him described him as modest, patient, and charitable, emphasising learning, honesty, and service to the community.

Through his eldest son Abdulla Katheeb, Manikfaanu was the grandfather of Abdul Samad Abdulla — one of the first medical doctors in the Maldives, who served as the country's Minister of Foreign Affairs — and Mohamed Latheef, co-founder of the Maldivian Democratic Party and one of the principal architects of modern democracy in the Maldives.

He is also the great-grandfather of Jennifer Latheef, human-rights activist and democracy campaigner; Khadeeja Abdul Samad Abdulla, Minister of State for Health and public health administrator; and through his son Saeed Katheeb, the great-grandfather of Mohamed Gasam, politician, former MP for Thinadhoo, and former Managing Director of Fuel Supply Maldives (FSM).

== Legacy ==
Hirihamaidhi Kaleygefaanu is remembered in southern oral histories as a symbol of enterprise, education, and moral courage. Historical accounts and oral testimonies, including Sandhaanu.today (2022) and Shafeega (2009), describe his contributions since the 1940s, when he played a leading role in rebuilding the south's trading economy after the Second World War, supporting civic welfare and education across the southern atolls, and assisting the government in averting famine during periods of national hardship.

His leadership is credited in local histories with strengthening inter-island trade networks, advancing literacy, and fostering civic responsibility that endured across generations.

Modern historians, including Jeffery (2024) and Shafeega (2009), describe him as embodying a blend of traditional authority and entrepreneurial vision. In contemporary discussions of reconciliation and transitional justice related to the Thinadhoo tragedy, Moosa Manikfaanu (Hirihamaidhi Kaleygefaanu) is often cited as a symbol of integrity and resilience, representing the compassion and hardships endured by southern Maldivians of his generation.

No official state record regarding his imprisonment or death has been published, and most biographical details are drawn from oral histories and secondary research.
