= Khadeeja Abdul Samad Abdulla =

Maldivian government official

- ޚަދީޖާ އަބްދުއްސަމަދު ޢަބްދުﷲ
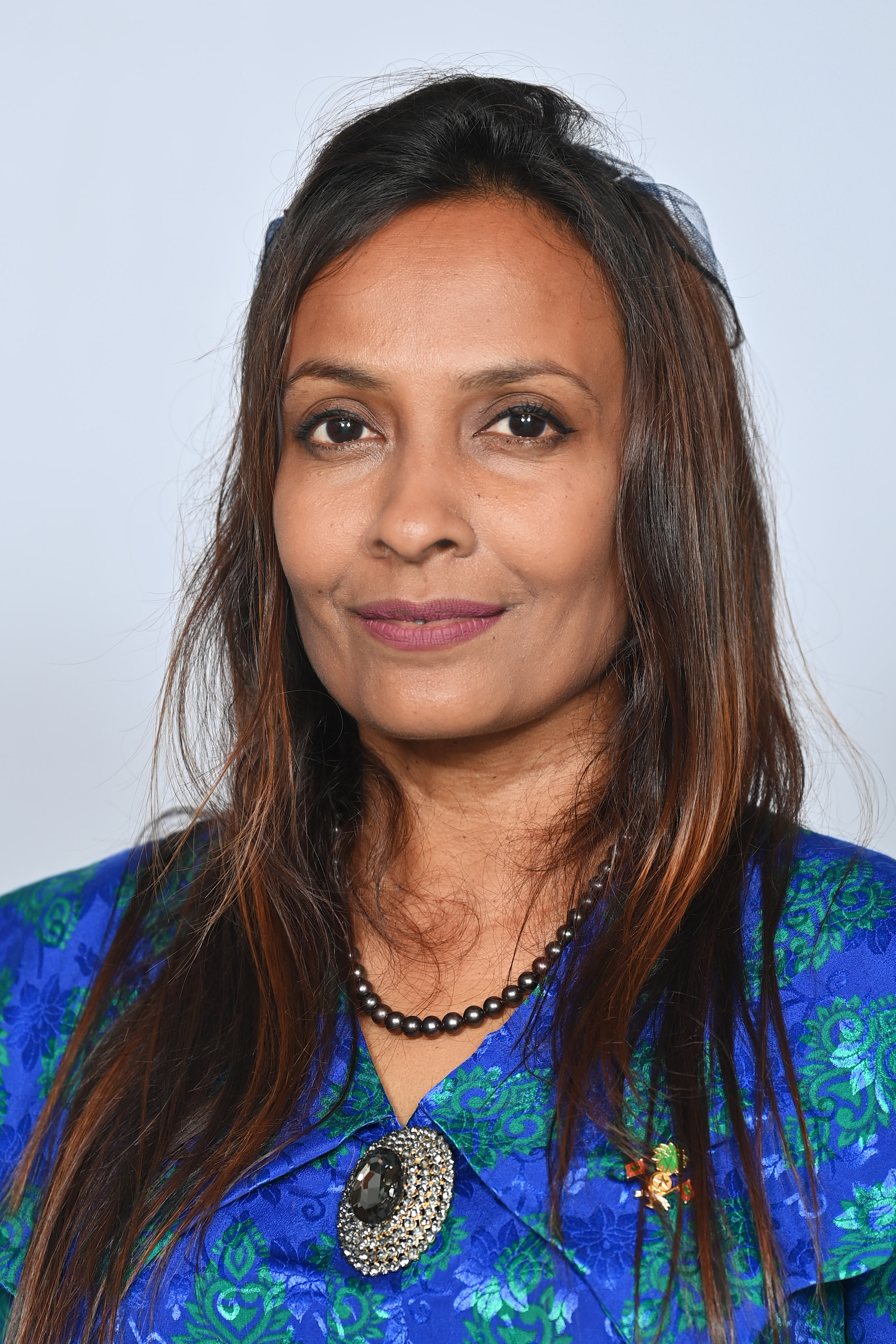
- Official portrait, 2024

Minister of State for Health
- Incumbent
- Assumed office 21 November 2023
- President: Mohamed Muizzu

Permanent Secretary at the Ministry of Health
- In office 25 February 2015 – 2020
- President: Abdulla Yameen; Ibrahim Mohamed Solih

Personal details
- Children: 1
- Parent: Abdul Samad Abdulla (father)
- Education: Master’s in Public Health and Health Systems Development
- Alma mater: Overseas School of Colombo (IB Diploma)
- Occupation: Public health administrator
- Known for: Health policy, system reforms, and international representation

Khadeeja Abdul Samad Abdulla (Dhivehi: ޚަދީޖާ އަބްދުއްސަމަދު ޢަބްދުﷲ) is a Maldivian public health administrator and government official who is currently serving as the Minister of State for Health of the Maldives since 2023. She was appointed to this position on 21 November 2023 by President Mohamed Muizzu. Prior to that, she served as Permanent Secretary at the Ministry of Health from 2015 to 2020.

== Early life and education ==
Abdulla was born in Malé to Abdul Samad Abdulla (a Maldivian physician, diplomat, and former Minister of Foreign Affairs) and Ameena Ali. Through her father’s side, she is the niece of Mohamed Latheef (co-founder of the Maldivian Democratic Party), the granddaughter of Abdullah Katheeb, and the great-granddaughter of Hirihamaidhi Kaleyfaanu — prominent merchant and civic leader whose descendants were among Maldives' prominent reformist families.

Abdulla completed her early schooling in Malé, then attended the Overseas School of Colombo in Sri Lanka, earning the International Baccalaureate Diploma. She later obtained a master’s degree in Public Health and Health Systems Development.

== Career ==
=== Permanent Secretary, Ministry of Health (2015–2020) ===
On 25 February 2015, Abdulla was appointed Permanent Secretary of the Ministry of Health by the Civil Service Commission.

As Permanent Secretary, she helped coordinate key policy frameworks and public health planning documents, including the Health Master Plan 2016–2025 and the Maldives Healthcare Quality Standards (2018).

She was also credited as Permanent Secretary in the Maldives Demographic and Health Survey 2016–17 final report.

In May 2018, Abdulla represented the Maldives as one of the Vice-Presidents of the 71st World Health Assembly held in Geneva.

=== Minister of State for Health (2023–present) ===
On 21 November 2023, Abdulla was appointed as Minister of State for Health under President Muizzu’s administration, leading initiatives on healthcare quality, system governance, and international cooperation.

== Policy and programme work ==
Abdull has contributed significantly to public health policy and governance in the Maldives.

- Maldives Healthcare Quality Standards (2018) — contributed to development of the national standards; the document carries a message under her name as Permanent Secretary and lists her among contributors.
- Health Master Plan 2016–2025 — acknowledged for providing direction during its formulation in collaboration with the WHO.
- Demographic and Health Survey (2016–17) — oversaw national data collection, the primary statistical source for population and health indicators.

== International engagement ==
Abdulla has represented the Maldives at numerous international and regional health forums.

- In 2018, served as one of the Vice-Presidents of the 71st World Health Assembly in Geneva.
- Cited by WHO SEARO in October 2024 for reaffirming the Maldives’ commitment to strengthening health systems.
- Appeared in WHO governance records in October 2024 as an observer in the Executive Board Officers’ meeting in place of the SEARO Vice-Chair.
- Shown in WHO’s multimedia archive during EB156 (February 2025) in Geneva with the Maldivian delegation.

== Personal life ==
Abdulla is married and has two children. Her father, Abdul Samad Abdulla, was a Maldivian physician, diplomat, and statesman who served as Minister of Foreign Affairs and High Commissioner to Bangladesh. His example influenced her early interest in public health and national service.His son named Jaulaan is one of the leading members in CIMA institute.
