= Mohamed Gasam =

Maldivian politician

- މުޙައްމަދު ގަސަމް

Managing Director of Fuel Supplies Maldives
- In office 4 February 2019 – 30 November 2023
- Succeeded by: Ismail Suhail

Member of the People's Majlis
- In office 28 May 2009 – 28 May 2014
- President: Mohamed Nasheed; Mohamed Waheed Hassan; Abdulla Yameen
- Succeeded by: Saudulla Hilmy
- Constituency: Thinadhoo

Personal details
- Party: Maldivian Democratic Party

Mohamed Gasam (Dhivehi: މުޙައްމަދު ގަސަމް) is a Maldivian businessman and politician who served as the managing director of Fuel Supplies Maldives, a subsidiary of the State Trading Organization of the Maldives from 2019 to 2023. He previously served as the Member of the People's Majlis for the Thinadhoo constituency from 2009 to 2014.

== Political career ==
According to a report by the World Organisation Against Torture (OMCT), he was among several Maldivian Democratic Party (MDP) activists detained in Thinadhoo in 2006 and subjected to pepper-spray while in custody—an incident cited internationally as part of the regime’s repression of pro-democracy demonstrators.

Gasam served as the Member of the People's Majlis for the Thinadhoo constituency following the 2009 parliamentary elections representing the Maldivian Democratic Party (MDP) during the 17th People’s Majlis.

In 2011, Gasam was present at the confrontation in Kaadedhdhoo Airport where former President Maumoon Abdul Gayoom was met with angry MDP members which escalated when Umar Naseer made derogatory remarks against President Mohamed Nasheed.

In 2013, when the Majlis accepted the Preventing Sexual Harassment in the Workplace Bill submitted by MP Rozaina Adam, Gasam was appointed to the 11-member ad hoc review committee formed to examine it.

=== 2012 protests and court case ===
Gasam was arrested on 30 July 2012 during an MDP protest, listed among detained MPs.

He was also detained and allegedly beaten during the 8 February 2012 protest crackdown near the Maldives Monetary Authority, documented by the Maldivian Democracy Network.

Two police officers were charged in 2014 with assaulting him during those events, and acquitted in 2016–2017 for lack of sufficient evidence.

== Business career ==
Gasam was appointed managing director of Fuel Supplies Maldives on 4 February 2019.

In October 2023, a viral video showed FSM employees destroying archived paperwork. Gasam denied wrongdoing, stating that only obsolete files were being disposed of. The National Archives of the Maldives and Anti-Corruption Commission sought investigation, and subsequently filed formal complaints with the police. The Privatization and Corporatization Board warned state owned enterprises to not destroy documents and warned of swift legal action.

On 30 November 2023, Gasam was dismissed as the managing director.

== See also ==
- Politics of the Maldives
- Maldivian Democratic Party
- State Trading Organization
