= 2003 Maldivian presidential election =

- 17 October 2003
- Turnout: 77.46%
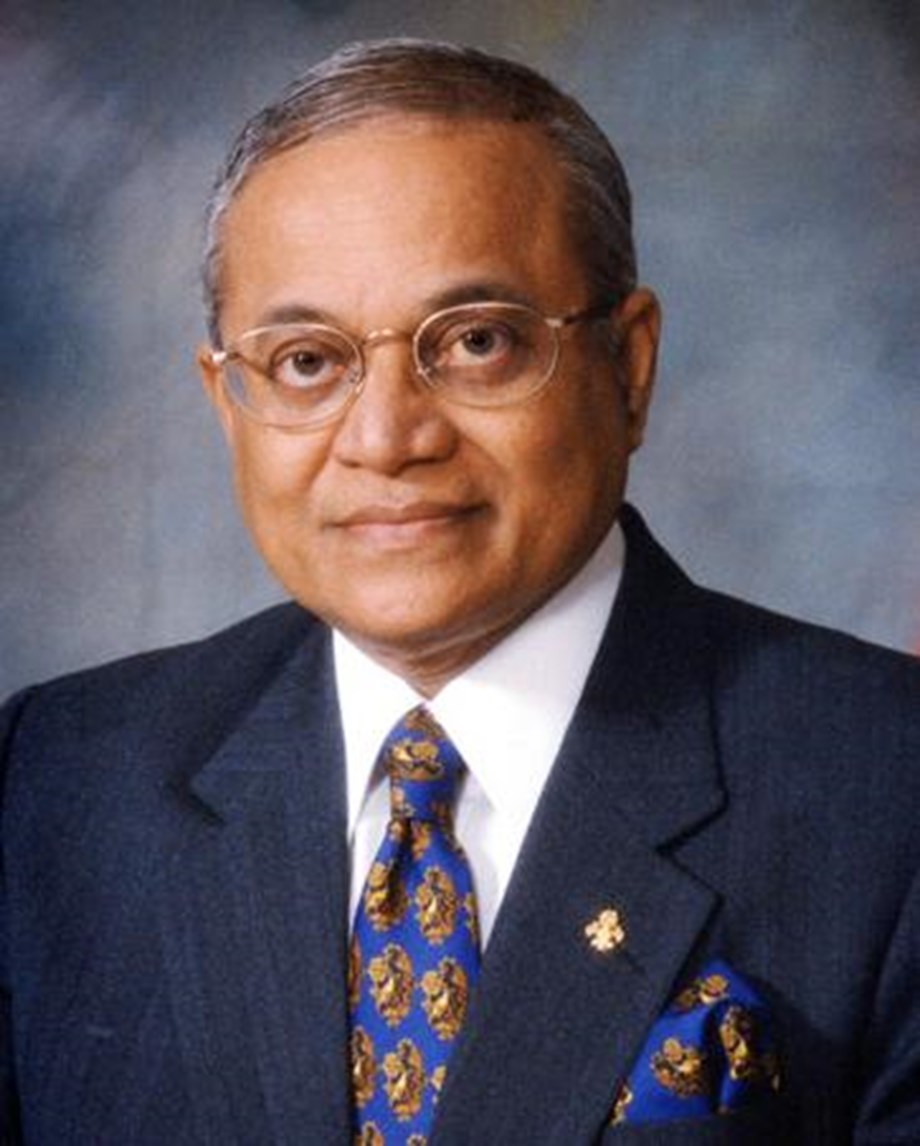
Nominee	Maumoon Abdul Gayoom
Party	Independent
Popular vote	102,909
Percentage	90.28%
President before election
Maumoon Abdul Gayoom
Independent
Elected President
Maumoon Abdul Gayoom
Independent

A Presidential election was held in the Maldives on 17 October 2003. The election took the form of a referendum on a single candidate nominated by the People's Majlis. This was the last presidential election held in the Maldives with only one candidate.

Gayoom's presidency started in 1978, and he became the longest-serving ruler in South Asia by 2003. The People's Majlis unanimously selected him as the only candidate in the election. Gayoom won his sixth term as president with 90.28% of voters supporting him. Civil unrest broke out during the election in response to the death of a political prisoner.

== Background ==
Maumoon Abdul Gayoom became president of the Maldives in 1978, and was the longest-serving ruler in South Asia by 2003. The Maldives did not hold a multiparty presidential election until 2008. Civil unrest broke out in Malé during the campaign in response to the death of political prisoner Hassan Evan Naseem.

== Conduct ==
The People's Majlis unanimously selected Gayoom to be the only candidate in the election. Voters selected yes or no for their votes. A minimum of 51% support is required to win.

== Results ==
Gayoom won reelection to a sixth term as president with 90.28% of the popular vote, slightly less than the 90.9% he received in the 1998 presidential election. The election had a turnout of 77.46% of registered voters. The election had 99.25% of the votes cast validated while 0.75% were invalidated.

Candidate	Votes	%
Maumoon Abdul Gayoom	102,909	90.28
Against	11,083	9.72
Total	113,992	100.00
Valid votes	113,992	99.25
Invalid/blank votes	857	0.75
Total votes	114,849	100.00
Registered voters/turnout	148,271	77.46
Source: IFES

== Aftermath ==
Gayoom announced political reforms in 2004, which allowed for the creation of opposition political parties. Mohamed Nasheed defeated Gayoom in the 2008 presidential election.

== Works cited ==
=== Journals ===
- Mallempati, Samatha (2017). "Internal Developments in Maldives and India-Maldives Relations". Indian Foreign Affairs Journal. 12 (3). Prints Publications Pvt: 243–257. doi:10.2307/45341996. JSTOR 45341996.
- Wille, Boris (2021). "Defending Islam in an Islamic State: Islamic Nationalist Discourse, Democratic Reform, and the Religious Commitment of the State in the Maldives". Asian Ethnology. 80 (1). Nanzan University: 199–226. doi:10.2307/27032444. JSTOR 27032444.

=== News ===
- "Defeated leader vows smooth transition". The Denver Post. 29 October 2008. Archived from the original on 11 November 2026.
- "Maldives leader wins sixth term". The Guardian. 20 October 2003. Archived from the original on 11 November 2026.
- "Maldives plans 'historic' reforms". Al Jazeera English. 10 June 2004. Archived from the original on 11 November 2026.
- Naji, Kasra (23 September 2003). "Dozens more arrested in Maldives". CNN. Archived from the original on 11 November 2026.
- Sambandan, V. (21 November 2003). "A sixth term for Gayoom". The Hindu. Archived from the original on 11 November 2026.

=== Web ===
- "2003 Presidential Referendum". International Foundation for Electoral Systems. Archived from the original on 13 June 2010.
- "Maldives". United States Department of State. Archived from the original on 11 November 2026.
- "Note on the Maldives" (PDF). European Parliament. 24 May 2006. Archived (PDF) from the original on 17 September 2026.
