= Rozaina Adam =

Maldivian politician (born 1976)

- ރޮޒައިނާ އާދަމް
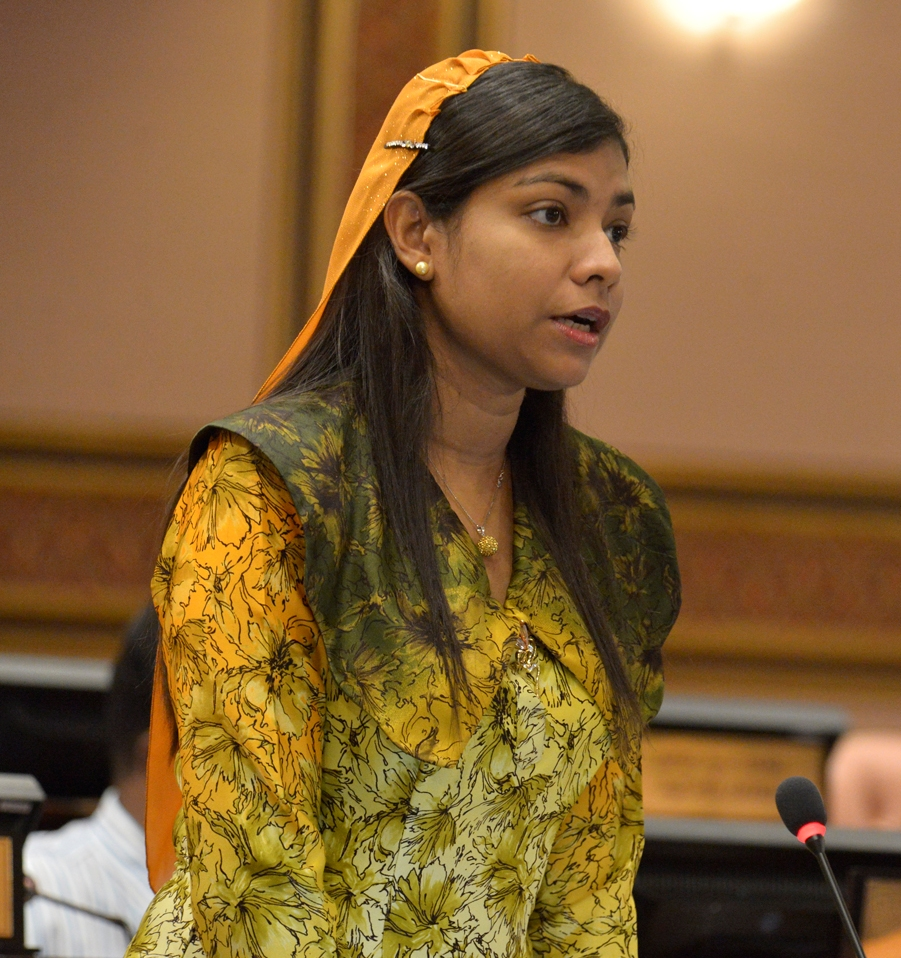
- Adam in 2014

Member of the People's Majlis
- In office 2014–2024
- President: Abdulla Yameen; Ibrahim Mohamed Solih; Mohamed Muizzu
- Speaker: Abdulla Maseeh Mohamed; Qasim Ibrahim; Mohamed Nasheed; Mohamed Aslam
- Succeeded by: Abdul Rahman
- Constituency: Addu Meedhoo
- In office 2009–2013
- Constituency: Thulusdhoo

Personal details
- Born: 12 December 1976 (age 49) Malé, Maldives
- Party: Maldivian Democratic Party
- Other political affiliations: Dhivehi Rayyithunge Party
- Education: University of Western Australia; Curtin University of Technology

Rozaina Adam (Dhivehi: ރޮޒައިނާ އާދަމް; born 12 December 1976) is a Maldivian politician who was a member of the People's Majlis, who represented the Addu Meedhoo constituency from August 2008 to May 2024.

She was the Majority whip of the Maldivian Parliament as well as the Chair of the Independent Institutions Committee. Additionally, she was a member of the Human Rights and Gender Committee. MP Rozaina was an executive board member of the Parliamentarians for Global Action (PGA). She was the chair of PGA's most recent initiative, Parliamentary Rapid Response Team (PARRT). She was also WPL's (Women Political Leaders) ambassador for the Maldives.

Rozaina was appointed as the deputy leader of Maldivian Democratic Party (MDP) parliamentary group on 2 June 2014 and filled this post until 2 July 2019. She represented the Thulusdhoo constituency in 17th People's Majlis. Before joining the MDP, she was a deputy leader of Dhivehi Rayyithunge Party (DRP).

== Education ==
Rozaina holds a master's degree in Marketing from University of Western Australia, and a bachelor's degree in Management and Marketing from Curtin University of Technology, Australia. She also has a certificate in Teaching Middle School Science and Mathematics.

== Political career ==
Rozaina was first appointed to the parliament as a representative of the president in 2008. After the new constitution of the Maldives was passed, she was elected in 2009 to represent the Thulusdhoo constituency of Kaafu Atoll on a DRP ticket. Rozaina was appointed as one of the deputy leaders of the DRP on 23 April 2013. She was also president and vice president of DRP Women's Wing. Rozaina was a council member of DRP. She stepped down from her post on 18 November 2013 and joined MDP. She was elected to the parliament in 2014 on an MDP ticket to represent AdduMeedhoo constituency and re-elected for the same seat in 2019. In the recent 2024 parliament elections, she lost her seat. She presented the bill on preventing domestic violence, sponsored the bill on preventing workplace harassment and the bill on protecting child rights. Rozaina is also a member MDP National Council.

On 13 August 2020, MP Rozaina Ahmed vocalized her despair on President Mohamed Nasheed for using parliament to intimidate Ministers and government officials. She stated her view after Economic Minister Fayyaz Ahmed was nominated for a no-confidence vote.

In 2024, Rozania lost her seat and later retired after 15 years as an MP.

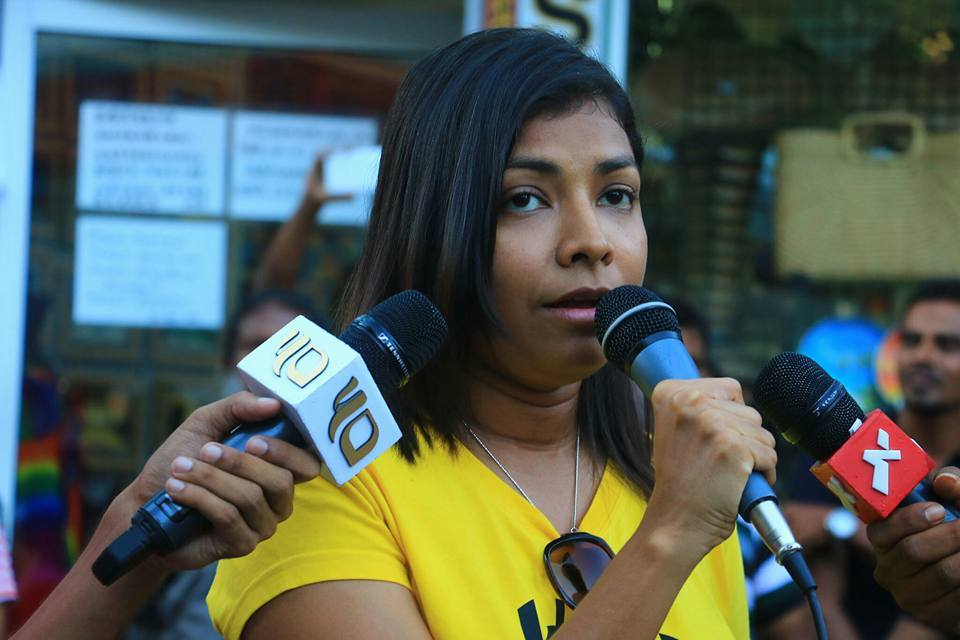
MP Rozaina Adam in an interview with Sangu TV and Raajje TV

== Personal life ==
Rozaina has been married to Mohamed Nashiz since 1997. Nashiz is a former Maldivian parliamentarian who represented the Alifushi constituency in the 17th Majlis and later served as the member of parliament for the Kimbidhoo constituency in the 19th parliament. Together, they have a daughter, Zaina Nashiz, and a son, Zain Nashiz.
