= Mohamed Latheef =

Maldivian democracy campaigner, politician, and human rights advocate

- މުޙައްމަދު ލަތީފް
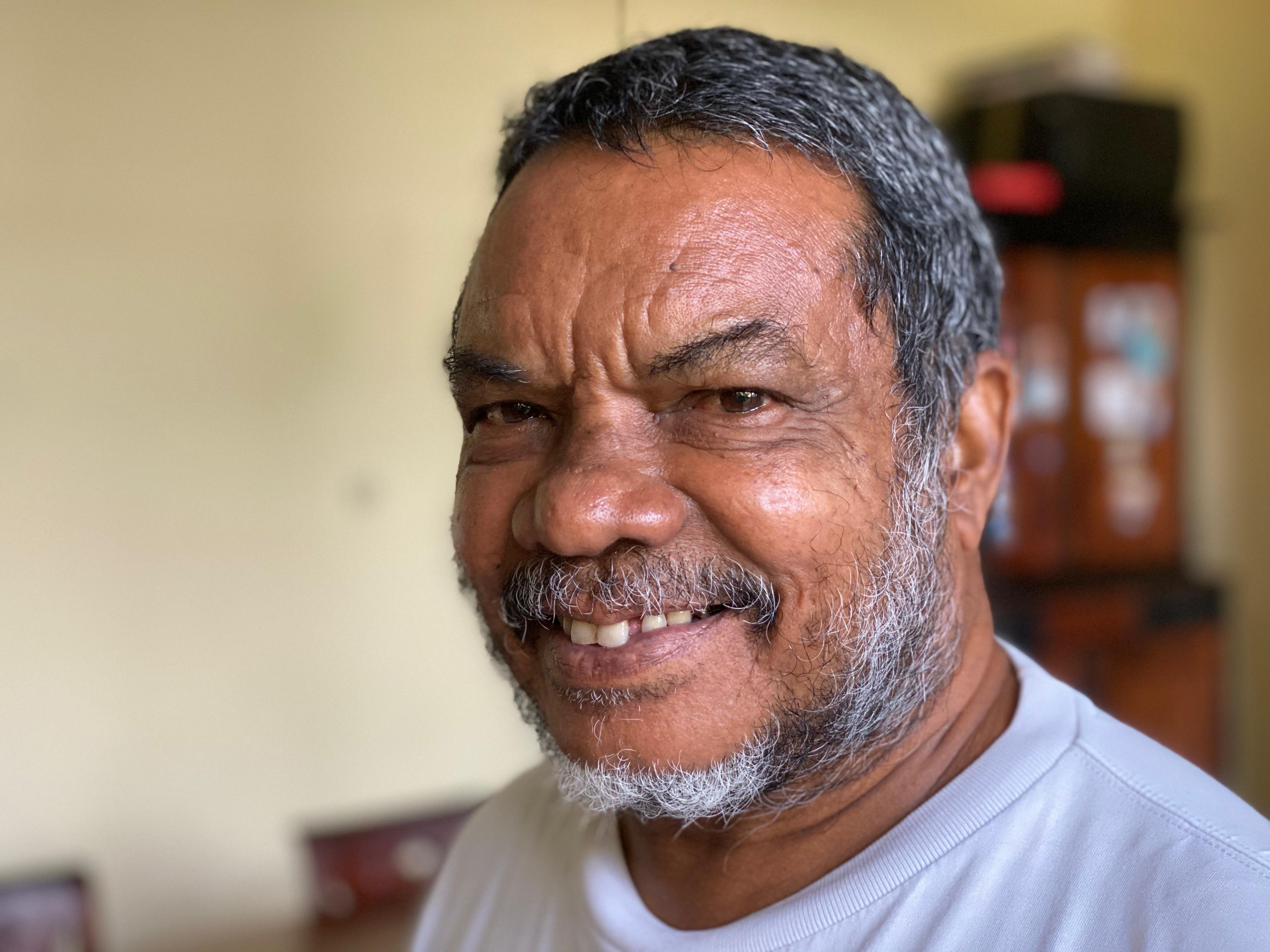
- Mohamed Latheef in Colombo, c. 2021
- Born: 1951; Thinadhoo, Gaafu Dhaalu Atoll, Maldives
- Died: 3 July 2022 (aged 70); Colombo, Sri Lanka
- Education: Trinity College, Kandy; Royal College, Colombo; American University of Beirut (political science studies)
- Occupations: Democracy campaigner; politician; human rights advocate; hotelier
- Years active: 1970s–2022
- Known for: Co-founding the Maldivian Democratic Party; founding Secretary-General of Maldives Association of Tourism Industry (MATI) (1982); civil-society leadership (Human Rights Ambassador; co-chair, South Asians for Human Rights (SAHR); chair, Raajje Foundation)
- Office: Member of the People's Majlis (elected 1989), Gaafu Dhaalu Atoll
- Political party: Maldivian Democratic Party
- Spouse: Wafiyya Najeeb
- Children: Jennifer Latheef; Ahmed Latheef; Marnie Latheef

Mohamed Latheef (Dhivehi: މުޙައްމަދު ލަތީފް; 1951 – 3 July 2022), also known as "Gogo" Latheef, was a Maldivian democracy campaigner, politician, and human rights advocate, widely regarded as one of the principal architects of modern democracy in the Maldives. He co-founded the Maldivian Democratic Party (MDP) in exile in 2003 and led the process of drafting its founding manifesto and the Colombo Declaration. He served as a member of the People's Majlis for Gaafu Dhaalu Atoll (elected 1989) and later as the Maldives’ Human Rights Ambassador in President Mohamed Nasheed’s administration. Beyond politics, he spearheaded the establishment of the Maldives Association of Tourism Industry (MATI) and served as its first Secretary-General (1982), and later as vice-president of the Maldives National Chamber of Commerce and Industry (MNCCI) in 2002.

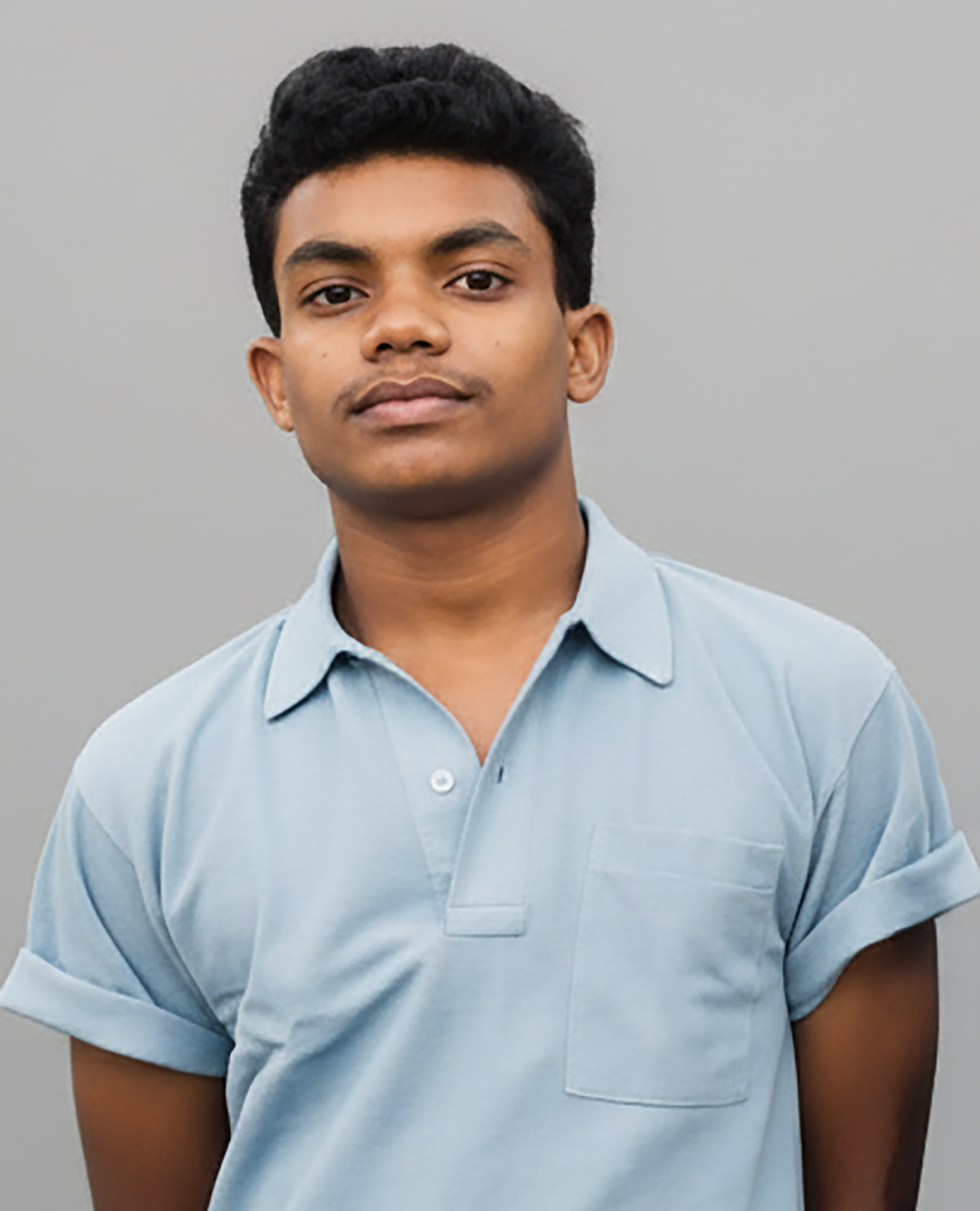
Mohamed Latheef as a teenager at Royal College, Colombo (c. 1966). Digitally restored and colorized (AI-assisted) from the original black-and-white photograph.

== Early life and education ==
Latheef was born in Thinadhoo, Gaafu Dhaalu Atoll, Maldives, historically known as Havaru Thinadhoo. He was the son of Abdullah Moosa (Abdullah Katheeb) and the grandson of Hirihamaidhi Kaleyfaanu (Moosa Manikfaanu). He was also the brother of Abdul Samad Abdulla, former Minister of Foreign Affairs of the Maldives.

He studied in Sri Lanka at Trinity College, Kandy and Royal College, Colombo, and later studied political science at the American University of Beirut.

== Business and private-sector leadership ==
Latheef began his public life as a journalist before moving into business; he was among the earliest generation of Maldivian hoteliers. Industry histories describe him as spearheading the establishment of the Maldives Association of Tourism Industry (MATI) in 1982, and he served as its founding Secretary-General. Chamber histories list Latheef among the early organisers and as a founding member of the Maldives National Chamber of Commerce and Industry (MNCCI); he later served as vice-president in 2002.

== Parliamentary career ==
In the 1989 elections, Latheef was elected to the People's Majlis for Gaafu Dhaalu Atoll. He aligned with a cohort of younger reform-minded MPs—including Dr Mohamed Waheed Hassan (Malé), Hassan Afeef (Thaa Atoll), Mohamed Shihab (Dhaalu Atoll), Mohamed Ibrahim Didi (Fuvahmulah) and Ibrahim Shareef (Addu Atoll)—who advocated greater transparency and oversight. Their agenda included raising unprecedented corruption allegations, seeking amendments to restrictive laws, and pressing for investigations into alleged graft. The group faced sustained pressure, including public vilification, administrative obstacles and contested resignations followed by by-elections in several constituencies. Latheef’s reform stance brought him into conflict with the authorities, and his parliamentary tenure ended following an arrest linked to his advocacy for political change.

== Detentions and exile ==
In September 1990, two months before the SAARC summit in Malé, Latheef was arrested after reportedly rallying MPs for a no-confidence motion. He was held around three months in solitary confinement without charge; Amnesty International reported his subsequent transfer to house arrest and later sentencing. On 15 April 1991 a special court sentenced him to six months of internal banishment to Mulhadhoo, Haa Alif Atoll, for “speaking in a manner that threatened public safety,” a catch-all provision used to criminalise criticism; the case stemmed from his parliamentary speeches and reform advocacy, which authorities deemed seditious. Exiled to the isolated northern island of Mulhadhoo—far from political centres—his influence and access to allies were restricted. He was required to resign his parliamentary seat immediately after sentencing, effectively silencing his voice in parliament. Rights organisations cited his case again in 1995 and continuing pressure on government critics. In December 2000–January 2001, after backing a detainees’ rights bill, he was detained again; Amnesty International named him among several figures held without charge.

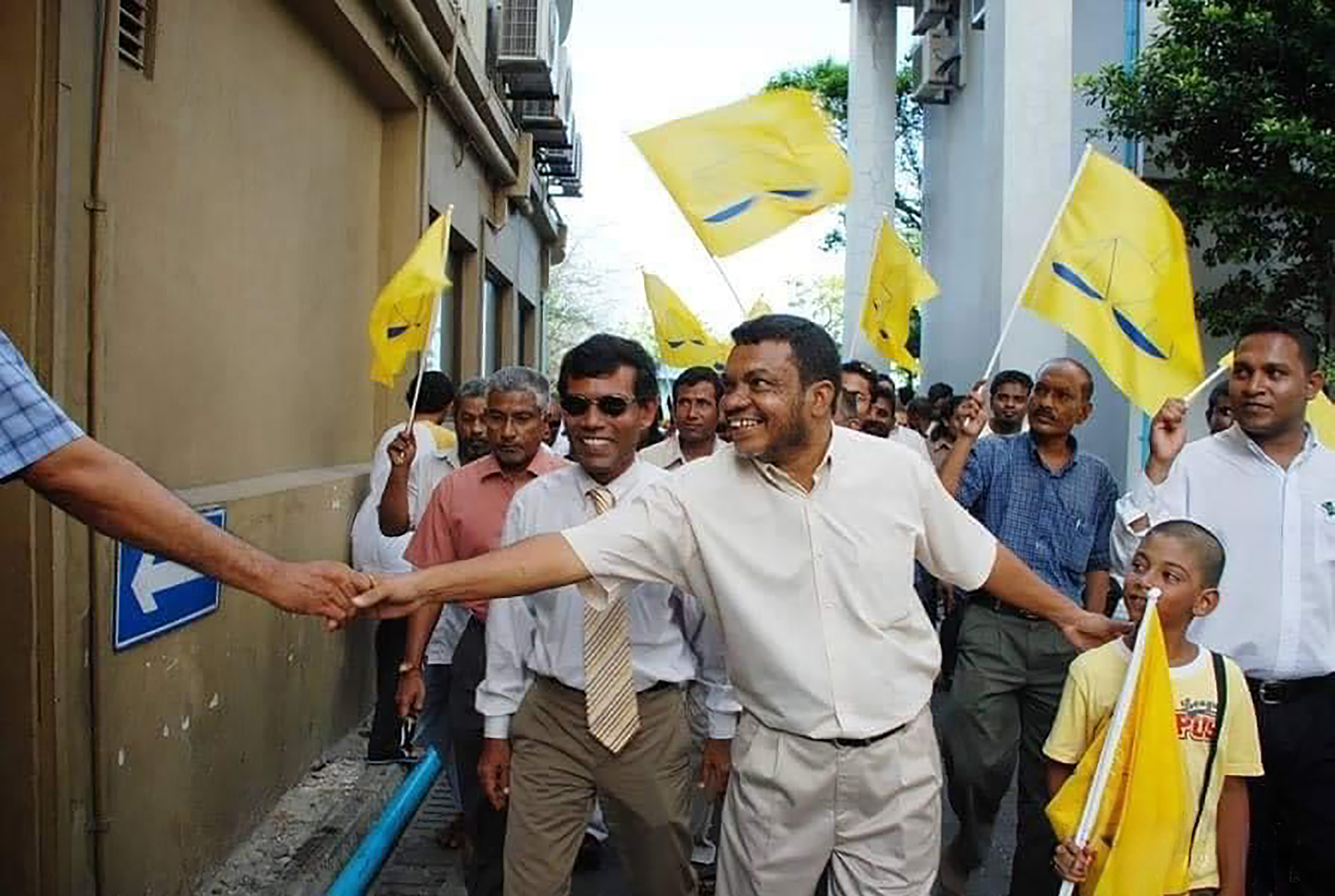
Latheef greeting supporters in Malé after returning from exile, 2007.

== Founding of the MDP and role in the democracy movement ==
Following the 2003 crisis after the killing of Evan Naseem, Latheef organised the formation of the Maldivian Democratic Party in exile in Colombo. He led efforts to establish the party’s organisation, diplomatic outreach, media strategy and foundational manifesto, and served as spokesperson engaging international media and diplomatic missions. The European Parliament records that Mohamed Nasheed joined him in November 2003 to help establish the MDP; that month they jointly issued the Colombo Declaration, which articulated demands for multi-party politics, constitutional reform and fundamental rights.

== Roles in the democratic transition ==
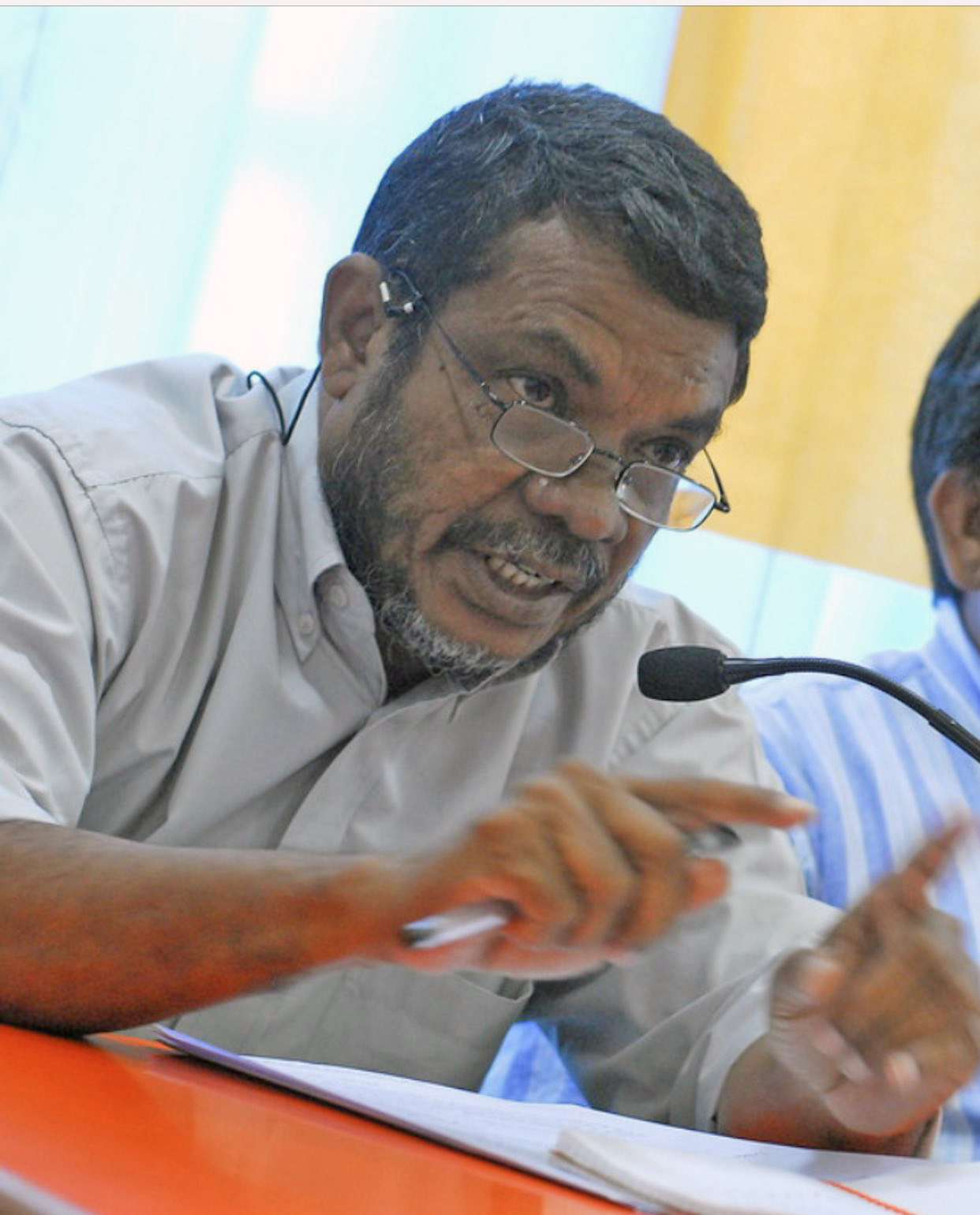
Latheef at an MDP press briefing in Malé, 2008.

Latheef later served as the Maldives’ Human Rights Ambassador in President Mohamed Nasheed’s administration and co-chaired South Asians for Human Rights (SAHR). In civil society Latheef chaired the Raajje Foundation and worked with Transparency Maldives on governance and anti-corruption initiatives.

== Personal life ==
Latheef was married to Wafiyya Najeeb. He had three children: Jennifer Latheef, a human rights defender recognised by Amnesty International as a prisoner of conscience in 2005–2006; Ahmed Latheef; and Marnie Latheef.

== Death and legacy ==
Latheef died in Colombo, Sri Lanka, on 3 July 2022, aged 70. People have described Latheef's death as an "irreplacable loss" to the country and has been credited as a co-founder to the democracy movement in the Maldives. In parallel, industry histories credit Latheef with early private-sector institution-building — as founding Secretary-General of MATI (1982) and later vice-president of MNCCI (2002). His 1990–91 detention and banishment, and later detentions in 2000–01, were recorded by Amnesty International and cited by rights groups at the time. Later roles as Human Rights Ambassador and SAHR co-chair reflected his continuing engagement with regional and international human-rights networks.
