= Ibrahim Nazil =

Maldivian politician

Member of the People's Majlis
- Incumbent
- Assumed office 28 May 2024

20th Parliament Minority leader
- Incumbent
- Assumed office 28 May 2024

Personal details
- Party: Maldivian Democratic Party

Ibrahim Nazil is a Maldivian politician who is currently serving as a member of the People's Majlis. A member of the Maldivian Democratic Party, Nazil is the minority leader and parliamentary leader of his party.
