= 2003 Maldives civil unrest =

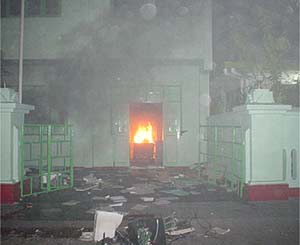
Building set on fire

On Saturday September 20, 2003 civil unrest broke out in Malé, the capital city of the Maldives. This unrest was provoked by the death of Hassan Evan Naseem at Maafushi Prison – located on a separate inhabited island – and the subsequent shooting at the same prison, that killed 3 and injured 17 others.

Many government buildings, vehicles and other public properties were set on fire, some were destroyed. The government controlled the unrest by around 23:00 and declared a State of Emergency in Malé and nearby islands. Late night curfews were enforced from 22:00 to 04:30 in Malé for more than a month following the rioting.

== Naseem's death ==
On Friday September 19, 2003, Naseem, who was serving at Maafushi Jail for drug abuse related offenses, was beaten by the NSS personnel of the security unit in the jail. This led to Naseem's death the following day. The beating came about as punishment for the disturbances from complicated disputes between Naseem's inmates and "neighboring" prisoners. To control the disturbances caused by these disputes (and reportedly to investigate this incident) security personnel came with a list of "troublemakers". Though it is said that, Naseem was not involved in the above-mentioned incident his name appeared on the list. The security guards then had gone in to round-up the listed prisoners. Naseem had resisted and had refused to leave his cell, demanding reasons for his summoning. This resistance ended up injuring a security guard which led to numerous members of the security unit storming into the cell. Naseem was then moved to solitary confinement (referred to as "The Range"). On the same night he was severely beaten up by 12 officers. He died in the early morning of September 20, 2003, largely due to injuries sustained to his lungs from the beating.

== Shooting incident ==
Inmates of Naseem learned of his death at around 11:00 on 20 September 2003. On receiving this news, they demanded to meet with a Security officer from the Department of Corrections. There was no response to these repeated demands. Some of the prisoners refused to take lunch to reflect their concern about Naseem's death.

Funeral prayers were performed by Naseem's inmates and many other prisoners, after mid-day prayers. Shortly afterwards a loud uproar came from Block C where Naseem's cell was located. Two inmates then jumped out of cell C3 after its corrugated iron sheets were pushed open. More prisoners followed them and attacked jail security unit personnel.They tried to calm the prisoners down for a while and then dispersed them when the prisoners refused to cease their attack. By now more inmates came out of the Block C and opened other Blocks, facilitating more prisoners to come out.

Captain Adam Mohamed, in charge of security unit, was informed of this uprising. He issued instructions to block the premises. Upon Mohamed's instruction to block the premises, Jail Security Unit personnel were issued riot gear. Prisoners on the loose confronted with this unit. Since prisoners highly outnumbered them, security personnel in riot gear soon retreated.

The angry mob then turned to Adam Mohamed himself. Mohamed Faseeh, a prisoner from the crowd, questioned him about Naseem's death, to which he did not respond reasonably. During this confrontation, Adam Mohamed ordered security units to take arms. Sergeant Shahid Ali Manik, shot the first shots into the air at 12:30. He then aimed and shot at Faseeh without further warning. Subsequently, Private Hassan Rifaau, Private Ahmed Mujuthaba Hussain and Private Mohamed Jinaah shot the prisoners. Some were shot from behind while retreating, others directly from the front.

Twelve rifles were issued from the armory and 15 persons had possession of them during the rampage.

=== Fatalities and casualties ===
A total of 20 people, including a security officer, were shot during the shooting incident at Maafushi prison. Fifteen of the 20 were shot above the knees and 9 of them were directly shot from behind while retreating. Six were shot from front and bullet entry points were not determinable in 5 persons. Abdulla Ameen died instantly due to being hit directly in the head. Two died in a Sri Lankan hospital while being treated.

Injuries of the shooting incident
Name	Wound location
Adam Ahmed Fulhu	Right forearm
Abdulla Hassan	Right thigh
Abdulla Mohamed Didi	sternum
Ahmed Easa	Left calf
Ali Nadeem Ibrahim	Right Buttocks
Ali Shafeeu	Left thigh, Left Buttock
Daud Jimreez	Left arm
Hassan Nabeel	Left armpit, left loin
Hussain Riyaz	Back
Ibrahim Moosa (Private)	Left thigh
Ibrahim Saeed	Right loin
Mohamed Faseeh	Left thigh, Left elbow
Mohamed Ijlaal	Right forearm
Mohamed Rameez	Right knee
Sujaj Abdulla Rasheed	Right ankle
Quiket Fernando	Right foot
Zuhair Abdulla	Left ankle

Prisoner fatalities of the shooting incident
Name	Age	Wound location
Abdulla Ameen	23	Head
Ahmed Shiyaz	18	Chest
Ali Aslam	18	Abdomen, Right forearm, intestine

== Unrest ==
Naseem was taken to Indira Gandhi Memorial Hospital, on September 20, 2003, in Malé. News of his death soon began to spread by word of mouth. By noon, many learnt about Naseem's death. People soon started gathering near the hospital to witness and to verify. Access was denied to the public and relatives, except for his mother and father.

A large number of people gathered at his burial service. While people were at the cemetery, news of the shooting incident reached the already angry public. Civil unrest in Malé started with this news. Several police stations were set on fire, government buildings were attacked, and government vehicles were set on fire or destroyed by the angry mob. Among the key places target were The Elections Division office, the Majlis and the High Court.

Tear gas drifted through the streets of Malé in the late evening and police used force to control the mob when as they reached Shaheed Hussain Adam Building. By 23:00, several people were arrested. President Maumoon Abdul Gayoom addressed to the nation soon after controlling the riot.

== Investigation ==
Gayoom established a Presidential Commission on September 20, 2003 to investigate Naseem's death and the shooting incident at Maafushi Prison. The findings of the commission were released to the public with the title "Report on the Death of Hassan Evan Naseem" or “Investigative Findings on the Death of Hassan Evan Naseem" and "Investigative Findings on the Incident of Shooting at Maafushi jail" respectively. However, several sections from these public report were omitted due to national security concerns.

During the investigation, survivors were interviewed and investigation teams were sent to Nawaloka Hospital and Apollo Hospital (now Lanka Hospitals) in Colombo where those who survived were being treated. Members of the commission visited Maafushi Jail on September 23 and October 6, 2003 and Girifushi Training Center (on November 30) to obtain information on the nature of weapons used in shooting. 12 people were pressed charges and 8 were given death sentences.

=== Members of the Presidential Commission ===
- Abdul Sattar Moosa Didi – Chairperson
- Shaaheen Hameed
- Abdulla Saeed
- Aishath Mohamed Didi
- Dr. Mohamed Solih
