= 2019 Maldivian parliamentary election =

- 6 April 2019
- All 87 seats in the People's Majlis; 44 seats needed for a majority
- Turnout: 81.32% (▲3.40pp)
| Party | Leader | Vote % | Seats | +/– |
|---|---|---|---|---|
| MDP | Mohamed Nasheed | 45.83 | 65 | +39 |
| JP | Qasim Ibrahim | 11.15 | 5 | −10 |
| PPM | Abdulla Yameen | 9.12 | 5 | −28 |
| PNC | Abdul Raheem Abdulla | 6.63 | 3 | New |
| MDA | Ahmed Siyam Mohamed | 3.16 | 2 | −3 |
| Independents | – | 21.55 | 7 | +2 |
This lists parties that won seats. See the complete results below.
Results by constituency
| Speaker before | Speaker after |
|---|---|
| Qasim Ibrahim; JP | Mohamed Nasheed; MDP |

Parliamentary elections were held in the Maldives on 6 April 2019. The result was a landslide victory for the Maldivian Democratic Party, which won 65 of the 87 seats in the People's Majlis. This was the first time in Maldivian history that one party was able to secure a supermajority in parliament.

== Electoral system ==
The 87 seats in the People's Majlis were elected in single-member constituencies using the first-past-the-post system. Prior to the elections the number of seats was increased from 85 to 87, with two new seats created in Malé; Machangoalhi Central was created by splitting Malé Central, whilst Hulhu-Henveiru was split into two new constituencies, Henveiru West and Hulhumalé.

== Campaign ==
Prior to the elections, talks about forming an opposition alliance were held between the Maldivian Democratic Party (MDP), the Jumhooree Party (JP), the Adhaalath Party (AP) and former president Maumoon Abdul Gayoom, with a proposed agreement that the MDP would contest 40% of constituencies, the JP 25%, Gayoom supporters 20% and the AP 15%. However, the MDP opted to contest the elections alone after rejecting their proposed seat distribution as being too low.

In December 2018 the PPM announced the names of 42 candidates for the elections, including 24 incumbent MPs. However, later in the month, former President Abdulla Yameen announced plans to leave the party and join the People's National Congress (PNC) due to a legal dispute over the leadership of the PPM. The PNC had been founded by Fonadhoo MP Abdul Raheem Abdulla with support from Yameen, and was also joined by Faafu Nilandhoo MP Abdulla Khaleel. The PPM and PNC would later announce an alliance for the election. Two other parties, the Maldives Labour and Social Democratic Party and the Maldives Third Way Democrats, were also founded in preparation for the elections.

The MDP held primary elections in January 2019, with 279 candidates running to become the party's nominees in 77 seats; in nine seats there was only one potential candidate, whilst there were no candidates for the PPM stronghold of Faafu Nilandhoo. Voting was open to around 86,000 party members, with five incumbent MPs being defeated. Former president Mohamed Nasheed was selected as the Machangoalhi Central candidate.

== Results ==
Initial results suggested that the Maldivian Democratic Party was on course to win at least 59 seats, up to a maximum of 68 seats, in the legislature. Ultimately, the MDP won 65 out of the 87 seats. This was the first time since a democratic government was established in 2008 that a single party had been voted into power without the need for a coalition. It is also the first time a party or coalition had been elected with a two-thirds majority, which would enable the legislature to remove judges from the bench. If any other MPs choose to support the government, the MDP faction will reach a three-fourths majority, and will be able to pass amendments to the Maldivian constitution. Elected MPs took office on 28 May.

Former President Mohamed Nasheed was elected to represent Central Machchangoalhi five months after returning from exile, becoming the first former Maldivian president to be elected to Parliament. Additionally, he is expected to lead the MDP in the legislature.

| Party | Votes | % | Seats | +/– |
|---|---|---|---|---|
| Maldivian Democratic Party | 96,354 | 45.83 | 65 | +39 |
| Jumhooree Party | 23,452 | 11.15 | 5 | –10 |
| Progressive Party of Maldives | 19,176 | 9.12 | 5 | –28 |
| People's National Congress | 13,931 | 6.63 | 3 | New |
| Maldives Development Alliance | 6,636 | 3.16 | 2 | –3 |
| Adhaalath Party | 4,423 | 2.10 | 0 | –1 |
| Maldives Labour and Social Democratic Party | 314 | 0.15 | 0 | New |
| Dhivehi Rayyithunge Party | 373 | 0.18 | 0 | 0 |
| Maldives Third Way Democrats | 293 | 0.14 | 0 | New |
| Independents | 45,301 | 21.55 | 7 | +2 |
| Total | 210,253 | 100.00 | 87 | +2 |
| Valid votes | 210,253 | 97.77 | | |
| Invalid/blank votes | 4,800 | 2.23 | | |
| Total votes | 215,053 | 100.00 | | |
| Registered voters/turnout | 264,442 | 81.32 | | |
Source: Commonwealth
