= Maldives Labour and Social Democratic Party =

Political Party in the Maldives

Maldives Labour and Social Democratic Party މޯލްޑިވްސް ލޭބަރ އެންޑް ސޯޝަލް ޑިމޮކްރެޓިކް ޕާޓީ
- Founded: 20 January 2019
- Dissolved: 4 June 2026
- Headquarters: Malé
- Ideology: Social democracy
- Political position: Centre-left

Website
- www.mvlabour.org

The Maldives Labour and Social Democratic Party (Dhivehi: މޯލްޑިވްސް ލޭބަރ އެންޑް ސޯޝަލް ޑިމޮކްރެޓިކް ޕާޓީ; MLSDP), commonly known as the Labour Party was a Maldivian political party founded in 2019.

An application to form the party was filled in August 2018 and the Electoral Commission granted approval in October 2018. The party was registered on 21 January 2019. On 1 July 2022, the Elections Commission dissolved the party for failing to reached the threshold of 3,000 members required for registration of political parties in Maldives. In March 2023, the party was removed from the register.

When the party was dissoluted, the party filed a case with the Civil Court. In November 2025, the court ruled in favour and ruled that the dissolution was unlawful. The party was later reinstated.

On 3 June 2026, the party was once again dissolved after failing to meet the 3000 member requirement.

== Election results ==
=== People's Majlis elections ===
Election	Party Leader	Votes	%	Seats	+/–	Position
2019	Ahmed Shiham	314	0.15%	0 / 87	New	7th
