= Maafushi Prison =

Maximum-security prison on Maafushi Island, Maldives

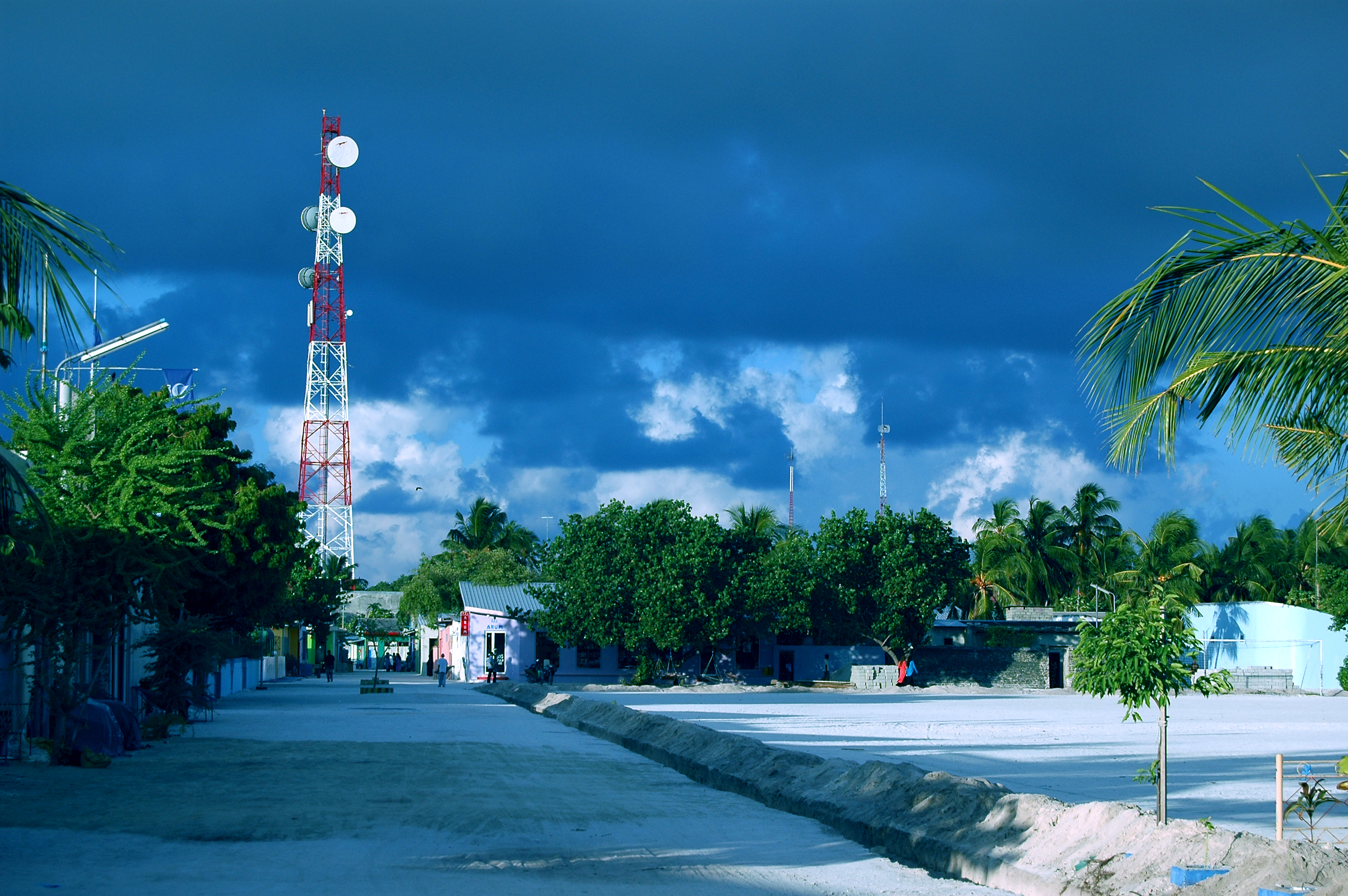

- Location within Maldives
- Location: Maafushi, Kaafu Atoll, Maldives; 3°56′12″N 73°29′11″E
- Status: Operating
- Security class: Maximum
- Population: 483 males and 36 females, as of February 2011
- Managed by: Maldives Correctional Service
- Website: en.corrections.gov.mv

Maafushi Prison is a prison in Maafushi on Kaafu Atoll in the Maldives, 18 miles (29 km) south of the capital, Malé. It is the largest prison on the islands and has held numerous political prisoners over the years, including former presidents like Mohamed Nasheed and Abdulla Yameen.

== History ==
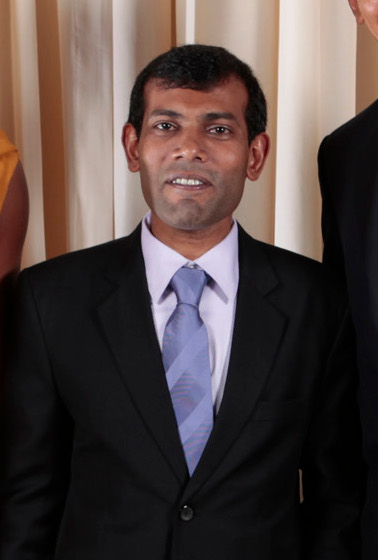
Former president of Maldives imprisoned in Maafushi Prison

In September 2003, an uprising broke out at the prison, which resulted in the deaths of inmates Hassan Evan Naseem and Abdulla Ameen. 12 others were taken to Sri Lanka for injuries, and another, Ali Aalaam, later died. The beating of the 19-year-old Naseem to death during the uprising caused a public outcry, and resulted in riots in Malé after his family displayed his disfigured body to the locals.

At around 7 am on August 13, 2004, the prison was taken during Black Friday. Later that day, Fathimath Nisreen, the secretary of online Sandhaanu publishers Ahmed Didi and Mohamed Zaki, were arrested by the National Security Service (NSS) during a crackdown on pro-democracy reformists and taken to Maafushi. Didi was taken to Girifushi due to health problems, but Zaki was incarcerated at Maafushi on 16 August.

In 2009 a number of riots and jailbreaks broke out, and on January 10 detainees went on a hunger strike in protest at the government's failure to improve the poor conditions of overcrowding and inadequate lighting. Prisoners set the prison on fire in April, affecting the health centre, a workshop and a desalination plant, and on April 5 a raid on the prison found homemade bombs, knives and more. A further riot in October 2009 caused further extensive damage to the prison through arson. Trouble continued the following year, with 15 prisoners injured during a riot in April, and a petition by 236 Maafushi inmates in July to the president, asking for improvements to the prison.

In April 2013, inmates and staff of the prison were all tested for tuberculosis after one detainee was tested positive with it.

The year 2014 witnessed many attacks by the inmates. On 17 October 2014, two murder convicts – Fariyash Ahmed of Gaafu Alifu, Maamendhoo and Ibrahim Shahum Adam of Malé – escaped from the prison by cutting the rods of the ventilator. Following this escape the Maldives Police Service (MPS) and the Maldives Correctional Service (MCS) initiated steps to reinforce the security system in the prison. On 1 December 2014, two more murder convicts – Ibrahim Shahum Adam and Fariyash Ahmed escaped from the prison but were caught soon thereafter. In another incident during an inspection visit to the prison cells four officers of the MCS were attacked by the inmates and two suffered serious injuries. These incidents have necessitated strengthening the existing 20 ft high wall with additional security measures such as electronic surveillance cameras, better lights and automatic locking systems.

In September 2015, British barrister Amal Clooney met Mohamed Nasheed, the jailed former president of the Maldives, at the prison ahead of a court hearing over his imprisonment.

In November 2019, former president Abdulla Yameen was incarcerated at the prison complex specially designed for higher class. He served his sentence until November 2021 when his sentence was overturned by the Supreme Court of Maldives and was freed.

== Prison reforms ==
After the September 2003 death of Hassan Evan Naseem in Maafushi Prison, the UNDP carried out a study of the prison conditions. Now, the Department of Penitentiary and Rehabilitation Services (DPRS) of the Ministry of Home Affairs (MoHA) has been put in place with the task of running the Maafushi Prison. Action has been initiated to evolve a reformed criminal justice system in the country. The measures undertaken are in the form of establishing the Human Rights Commission of Maldives (HRCM). On 7 August 2008, a new constitution was ratified with incorporation of a clause on the bill of rights. Many more reforms are on the anvil, such as the Penal Code, Criminal Procedure Code, Evidence Bill, Prison & Parole Bill and Drugs Bill. On 31 December 2013, President Yameen established the Maldives Correctional Service which manages all the jails in the Maldives and abolished the DPRS.

== Notable inmates ==
- Jennifer Latheef, journalist, in prison from 2005 to 2006, daughter of Mohamed Latheef, a leading Maldivian politician and government critic
- Hassan Evan Naseem, serving for drug offences died in 2003 in prison custody sparking public outrage
- Mohamed Nasheed, former president, serving 13 years from 2015 which he evaded by seeking political asylum from India in Indian Embassy.
- Mohamed Zaki, businessman, politician and online publisher.
- Abdulla Yameen, former President jailed from November 2019 till November 2021 and since 25 December 2022 till 19 April 2024.
