= Aasahara Mosque =

Mosque in Malé, Maldives

- Dhivehi: އާސަހަރާ މިސްކިތް
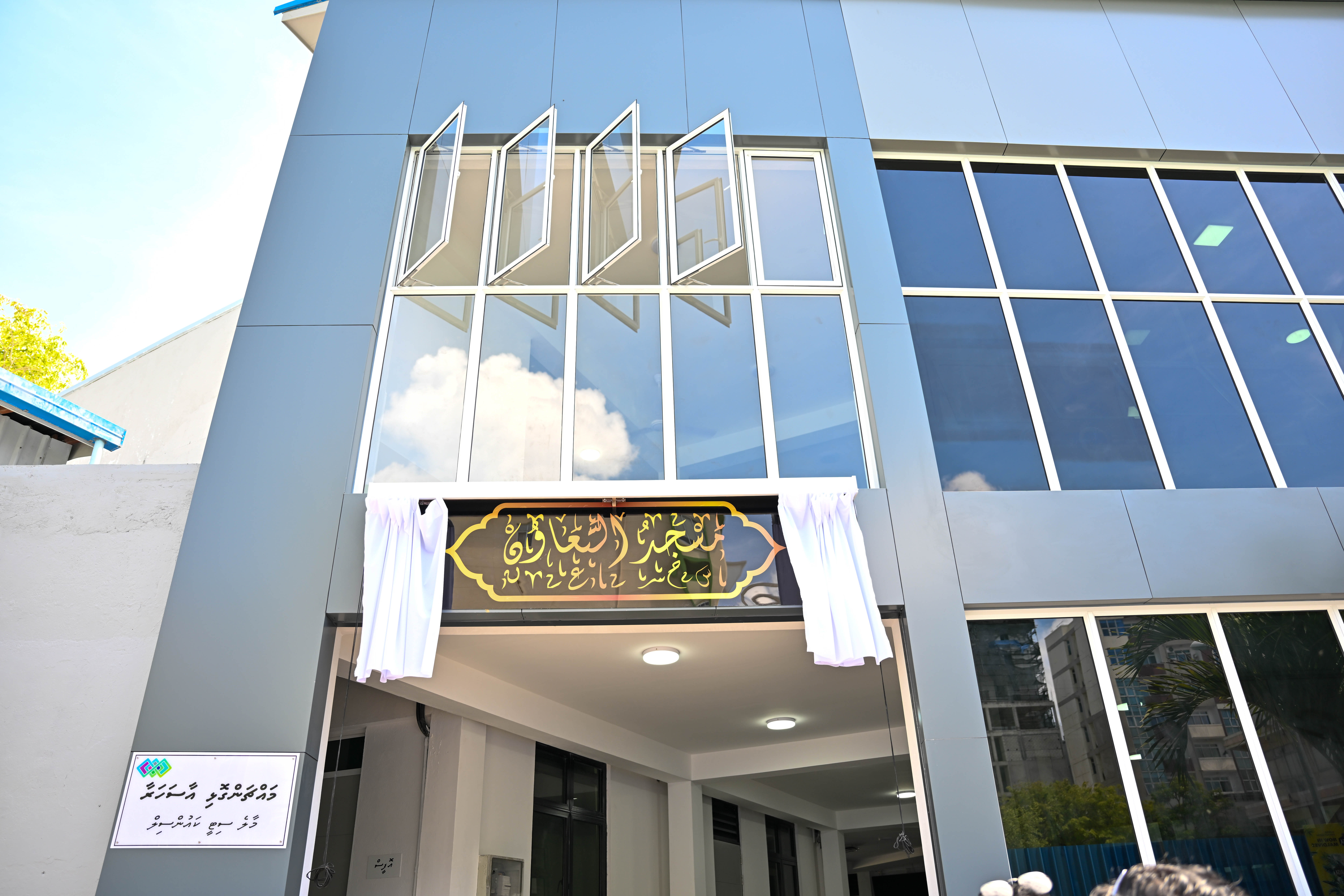
- The mosque in 2024

- Location of the mosque in the Maldives

Religion
- Affiliation: Sunni Islam
- Ecclesiastical or organizational status: Mosque
- Status: Active

Location
- Location: Machchangolhi, Malé
- Country: Maldives
- Interactive map of Aasahara Mosque
- Coordinates: 4°10′15″N 73°30′28″E

The Aasahara Mosque, (Note: Sometimes spelled as Aa Sahara Mosque and also known as Aa Sahara Cemetery Dhivehi: އާސަހަރާ މިސްކިތް) officially known as Masjid al-Ta'aawun, (Note: Arabic: مسجد التغاون) is a Sunni Islam mosque and graveyard, located in Machchangolhi of Malé in the Maldives.

== History ==
Most of the history of Aasahara Mosque is relatively unknown.

In 2020, during the COVID-19 pandemic, Aasahara Mosque was one of two mosques holding funeral prayers in Malé.

The Malé City Council renovated the mosque in 2024 using the 'Chaalu Miskiy' fundraiser, where they collected Rf. 700,000. A fully air conditioned two-storey structure was built, more spacious room for the Funeral House with purpose-built areas, designated motorcycle parking, separate toilets for people with special needs and children gender-segregated facilities. President Mohamed Muizzu inaugurated the renovated mosque.

== See also ==
- Islam in the Maldives
- List of mosques in the Maldives
