= Maldives Third Way Democrats =

Political party in the Maldives from 2018 to 2025

Maldives Third-Way Democrats މޯލްޑިވްސް ތަރޑް-ވޭ ޑިމޮކެރެޓްސް
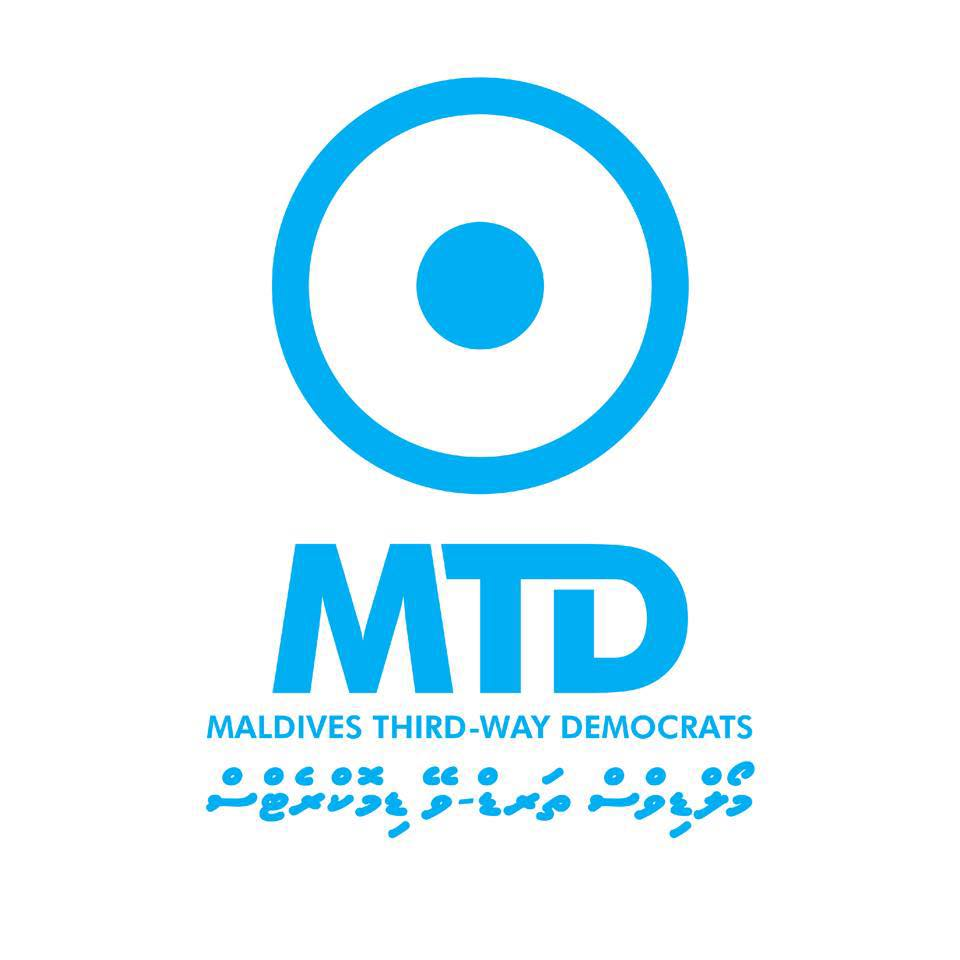
- Abbreviation: MTD
- President: Ahmed Adeeb
- Vice President: Aminath Vijna Mohamed
- Founded: 28 December 2018
- Dissolved: 26 August 2025
- Split from: Progressive Party of Maldives
- Membership (June 2025): 2,272
- Ideology: Third Way; Economic liberalism

Website
- mtd.mv

The Maldives Third-Way Democrats was a Maldivian political party founded in December 2018.

Maldives Third-Way Democrats (MTD), a political party officially registered in the Maldives. MTD attained formal registration at the Elections Commission on 27 December 2018.

MTD was a mix of young politicians and more familiar veteran leaders in local politics. The first signatory to the party was the former Vice President of Maldives, Ahmed Adeeb Abdul Gafoor, who wrote the charter of the party in jail in isolation. MTD presented its formal membership documentation to the Elections Commission with 3,333 members, who had joined the new party in a matter of weeks.

On 26 August 2025, the Elections Commission dissolved the party after failing to meet the minimum member requirement of 3,000. MTD stated that the party was dissolved without any due process and that the party was being unlawfully silenced.
