= Maldives Development Alliance =

Political party in the Maldives

Maldives Development Alliance މޯލްޑިވްސް ޑިވެލޮޕްމަންޓް އެލަޔަންސް
- Abbreviation: MDA
- Leader: Ahmed Shiyam Mohamed
- Founded: 20 December 2012
- Headquarters: Malé, Maldives
- Membership (June 2026): 8014
- People's Majlis: 2 / 93

Website
- mda.mv

The Maldives Development Alliance (Dhivehi: މޯލްޑިވްސް ޑިވެލޮޕްމަންޓް އެލަޔަންސް) is a political party in the Maldives led by Ahmed Shiyam Mohamed.

== History ==
The party was formed in 2012 by Ahmed Shiyam Mohamed. It was officially recognised by the People's Majlis on 21 October 2013, after it had gained three MPs; Ahmed Shiyam Mohamed, Ahmed Moosa and Ahmed Amir. It became part of a coalition with the Progressive Party of Maldives, supporting its candidate, Abdulla Yameen, in the presidential elections.

In the 2014 parliamentary elections it won five seats. It was reduced to two seats in the 2019 parliamentary elections and remained at two seats following the 2024 parliamentary elections.

== Election results ==
=== People's Majlis ===
Election	Leader	Votes	%	Position	Seats	+/–
2014	Ahmed Shiyam Mohamed	7,496	4.04	4th	5 / 85	New
2019	Ahmed Shiyam Mohamed	6,636	3.16	▼5th	2 / 87	▼3
2024	Ahmed Shiyam Mohamed	4,071	1.93	▲4th	2 / 93	0
