= Overseas School of Colombo =

Location
- 325, Box 9 Battaramulla-Pannipitiya Road; Battaramulla, Western; Sri Lanka
- Coordinates: 6.892958942816892°N 79.92914887305321°E

Information
- Former name: The Colombo School for Overseas Children
- School type: Private Non-Profit Institution
- Motto: Unity in Diversity
- Established: c. 1957
- Interim Board Chair: Ms. Aishath Lu-u-lua Hassan
- Head of School: Dr. Michelle Kleiss
- Age: 3 to 18
- Campus: Rippleworth
- Accreditation: MSA; CIS
- Website: https://www.osc.lk/

The Overseas School of Colombo is a multinational English medium international school located in Pelawatte near Battaramulla, a suburb of Colombo, Sri Lanka. The school offers IB programs from Pre-K through to 12th grade in Sri Lanka. OSC is accredited by the Council of International Schools and the Middle States Association of Colleges and Schools.

== History ==
Founded in 1957 as a non-profit organisation under Sri Lankan law, the school was named The Colombo School for Overseas Children. It was located at Queen's Street in Colombo Fort when the school opened on 23 September 1957. The founders were from diplomatic missions (British High Commission, Burmese High Commission and Dutch Embassy) and the business community; this still reflects the school population today.

In September 1961, the school leased the premises known as "Rippleworth" at Turret Road (Dharmapala Mawatha) in Colombo 3. The younger children remained at the Fort while the older children moved to Rippleworth. In August 1963 the school in Fort had 100 children, while the school at Rippleworth, known as the Upper School, had about 72 children. In 1967 the school gained accreditation by the International Schools Association in Geneva, Switzerland.

To cope with an increasing numbers of pupils, in 1971 the school relocated to 51 Muttiah Road in Colombo 2 (Rivington) until finally in 1983 the school was relocated to its present address Pelawatte, Battaramulla. During the same year the school obtained accreditation by the International Baccalaureate (IB) Organisation as an IB World School offering the IB Diploma Programme. In 1982, the school changed its name to Overseas Children's School (OCS).

In 1990 the school received further accreditations from ECIS (European Council of International Schools) and MSA (Middle States Association of Colleges & Schools) and over the next five years opened a gymnasium and swimming pool. As the school developed it became recognised as an Office of Overseas sponsored school and has built close ties with the US Embassy while maintaining links with the other diplomatic missions. In 1996 the school took its present name, The Overseas School of Colombo. Continuing its campus development programme, the school built a performing arts facility in 2005, renovated its primary and secondary libraries, and inaugurated a new sports facility in 2009.

The Overseas School of Colombo remains Sri Lanka's oldest internationally accredited educational institution. It is the only school in Sri Lanka to offer the International Baccalaureate Programme from Pre-school to Grade 12.

== Curriculum ==
OSC is a full IB World school offering the IB Primary Years Programme, Middle Years Programme and Diploma Programme.

== Students ==
For the 2010–11 school year, the student body numbers 410, from 40 nationalities. The largest percentage of students are Sri Lankan 19% with Americans comprising 14%, Indians 10%, British 9% and Australian 6%.

The majority of the families come from foreign missions, United Nations organisations and NGOs, while the rest are mainly from the corporate sector. The average annual turnover of students is 25% due to families being transferred to other posts abroad. OSC graduates go on to universities in the United States, England, Canada, Australia, and Sri Lanka among other countries.

== Student Government Association ==
Every student at the OSC is a member of the Student Government Association (SGA) a forum for their voices. The organisation helps maintain a high level of cooperation and school spirit, extending to the Primary School also in the form of the PSGA.

The SGA consists of an executive committee and a membership of two elected representatives from each grade level guided by a teacher supervisor. The representatives attend weekly meetings to provide feedback on students’ requirements, ideas and issues, and two SGA representatives also attend School Board meetings.

== Community service ==
OSC students participate in community service activities. All Secondary School students enroll in community service projects which mostly take place on Thursday afternoons. The projects range from work with sick or orphaned children, to support for street dogs through inoculations.

== Notable alumni ==
- Catherine Arnold – British diplomat
- Ezra Kire - punk rock musician
- Mohamed Nasheed - A former President of the Maldives
