= Ahmed Siyam Mohamed =

Maldivian politician and businessman (born 1969)

- އަޙްމަދު ސިޔާމް މުޙައްމަދު
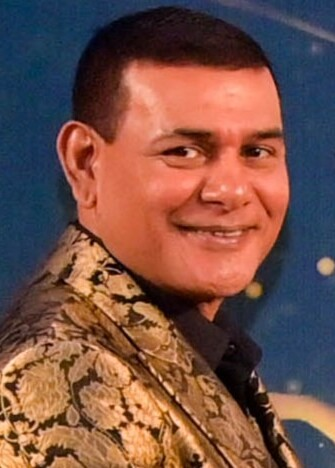
- Mohamed in 2022

Member of the People's Majlis
- Incumbent
- Assumed office 28 May 2014
- Preceded by: Constituency established
- Constituency: Meedhoo

Leader of the Maldives Development Alliance
- Incumbent
- Assumed office 20 December 2012
- Preceded by: Post established

Personal details
- Born: 21 July 1969 (age 57)
- Party: Maldives Development Alliance
- Other political affiliations: Dhivehi Rayyithunge Party
- Website: majlis.gov.mv

Ahmed Siyam Mohamed (Dhivehi: އަޙްމަދު ސިޔާމް މުޙައްމަދު; born 21 July 1969), often referred to as Sun Siyam, is a Maldivian politician and businessman who has been serving as a Member of the People's Majlis for Dhaalu Meedhoo Constituency since 2014 from the 18th to the 20th Parliament. Siyam is also the founder and leader of Maldives Development Alliance. Further, he is the founder and chairman of Sun Siyam Resorts, chairman and managing director of Sun News as well as Sun Siyam TV.

== Early life ==
Ahmed Siyam Mohamed was born on 21 July 1969. He was born to Mohamed Qasim (1943–2024), as the eldest of his nine children.
