= People's Majlis =

Parliament of the Republic of Maldives

People's Majlis ރައްޔިތުންގެ މަޖިލިސް Rayyithunge Majilis
- 20th Parliament of the Maldives
- Emblem

Type
- Type: Unicameral
- Term limits: 5 years

History
- Founded: 22 December 1932 (established); 12 January 1933 (first session)
- New session started: 28 May 2024

Leadership
- Speaker: Abdul Raheem Abdulla, PNC since 28 May 2024
- Deputy Speaker: Ahmed Saleem, PNC since 1 June 2026
- Secretary General: Fathimath Niusha
- Majority Leader: Ibrahim Falah, PNC
- Minority Leader: Ibrahim Nazil, MDP

Structure
- Seats: 93
- Political groups: Majority (74) PNC (74) Minority (13) MDP (13) Others (6) MDA (2) JP (1) MNP (1) IND (2)

Elections
- Voting system: First-past-the-post
- Last election: 21 April 2024
- Next election: 2029

Motto
- وَأَمْرُهُمْ شُورَىٰ بَيْنَهُمْ (wa amruhum shūrā baynahum) "Conduct their affairs through mutual consultation”

Meeting place
- 80 Medhuziyaaraiy Magu, Henveiru, Malé 20080

Website
- majlis.gov.mv

Constitution
- Constitution of the Maldives

The People's Majlis (Dhivehi: ރައްޔިތުންގެ މަޖިލިސް, romanized: Rayyithunge Majilis) is the unicameral legislative body of the Maldives. It has the authority to enact, amend and revise laws, as outlined in the Constitution of the Maldives. It is composed of 93 members as of 2024.

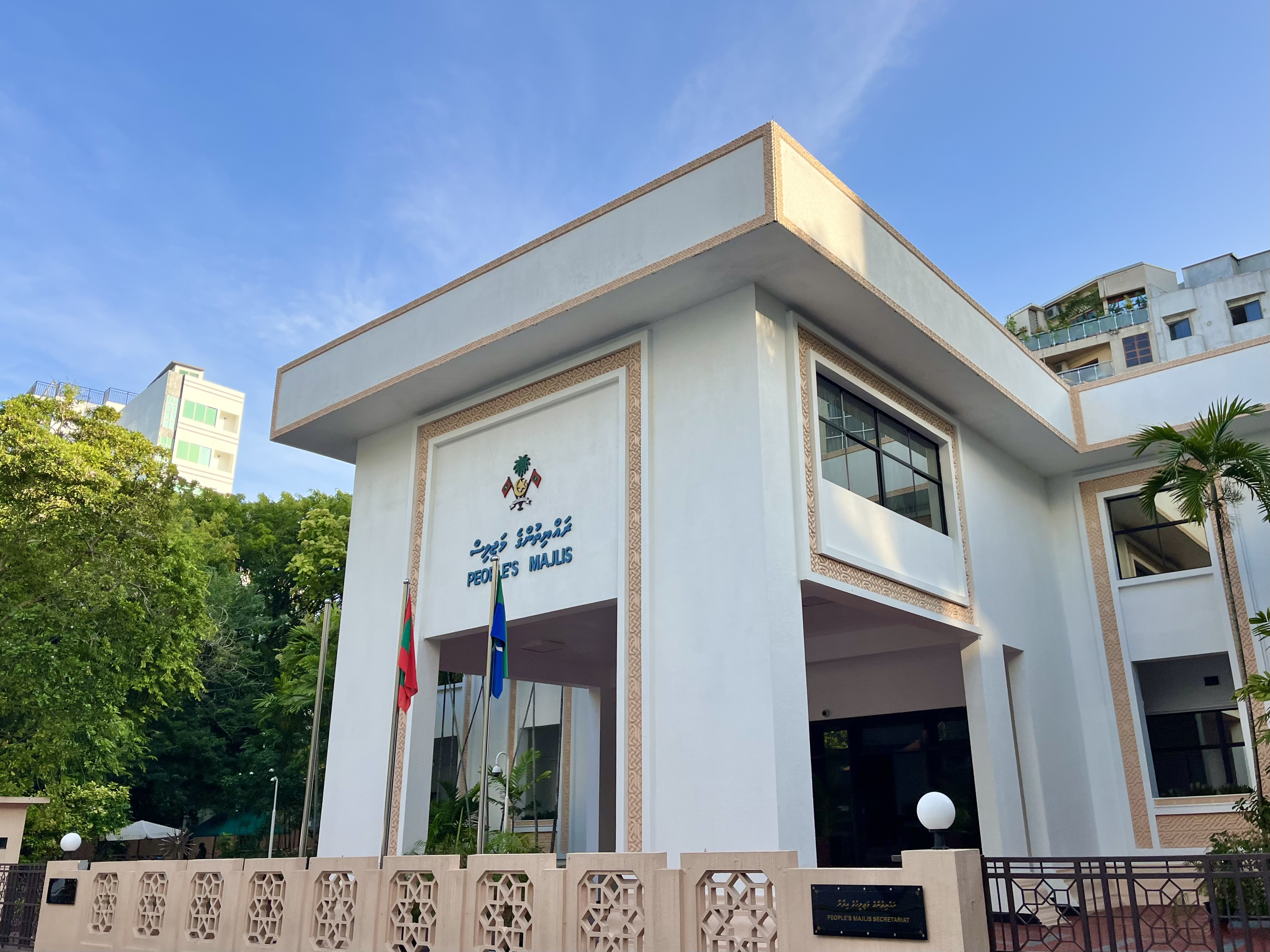
People's Majlis

Flag of the People's Majlis

Each year on the first Monday or Thursday of February, the Majlis is opened by the President of the Maldives. During the opening of ceremony, the president outlines his policies and achievements in his presidential term. The annual state budget is decided here. Its working language is Dhivehi.

== Etymology ==
Majlis is the Arabic word for a sitting room. It can also refer to a legislature, and is used in the names of legislative councils and assemblies in some states of the Islamic world.

== History ==
A council was set up by Sultan Muhammad Shamsuddeen III to draft the Constitution of the Maldives on 9 March 1931. The council completed and implemented the constitution on 22 December 1932. This constitution was the basis for the formation, of the first ever Majlis of the Maldives. The meetings of this Majlis were held in the "Hakura Ganduvaru". The first president or the speaker of the Majlis was Al Ameer Mohammed Farid Didi. Maldives was then ruled by a sultan and the advent of the new constitution was seen as a threat to the sultanate. Thus, mobs were instigated against the constitution and it was publicly torn up. Since then the constitution of the Maldives has been revised a number of times.

During the era of First Republic of the Maldives from 1953 to 1954, there was a bicameral legislature which included Senate of the Maldives. The Republican constitution was abolished in January 1954 and unicameral legislature was restored.

=== Parliament building construction ===
The present parliamentary building of the People's Majlis was inaugurated on 1 August 1998, with the presence of Pakistan's then-Prime Minister Nawaz Sharif. The building was built with the assistance of the Pakistani government, who provided a grant of Rs. 45 million ($4.25 million) for its construction.

=== Incidents ===
- 2003 Maldives Unrest: In 2003, amid unrest that unfolded after the killing of political prisoner Hassan Evan Naseem by security personnel at Maafushi Prison, some rioters threw stones at the Parliament building.
- 2012 Maldives Crisis: The opening session of Parliament was halted when protesters blocked Mohamed Waheed Hassan from entering the building.
- Assassination of Afrasheem Ali: On 2 October 2012, Member of Parliament Afraasheem Ali was fatally stabbed near his home in Malé. The murder of a sitting legislator marked one of the most serious acts of violence against a member of the Majlis.
- 2024 Legislative violence over cabinet appointments: In 2024, there were physical altercations between opposition and government parliamentarians over the cabinet appointments of president Mohamed Muizzu. Opposition MPs were later hospitalized.
- 2025 protests and expulsions during Maldives Media and Broadcasting Regulation Act debate: parliamentary proceedings were disrupted during debates on the Maldives Media and Broadcasting Regulation Bill. Opposition MPs protested inside the chamber, and some were forcibly removed. At the same time, journalists staged protests inside and outside the Majlis building, with reports of arrests and use of force by police.
- 2026 removal of government party MP by Supreme Court over debit issue: In 12 April 2026, the Supreme Court removed a sitting ruling member of parliament from office over failure to comply with a court ruling related to a financial dispute. The decision marked one of the first disqualifications affecting members of the 20th Majlis.

== Members and elections ==
The constitution of the Maldives was re-written in 2008, and the composition, electorates and powers of the Majlis changed drastically. After the change, Majlis had 85 seats, one from each electorate, has an elected speaker from among members, has substantially expanded powers, has been elected in multi-party elections since 2009 and generally resembles the legislatures in other liberal democracies.

Two members are elected from each administrative atoll under the new constitution. Another two members are elected from the capital Malé. The president appoints 8 members to the Majlis. In the past the Majlis was fully controlled by the ruling regime, but it has since changed following the adoption of the new constitution in 2008 and the first multi party election in 2009.

The members are elected for a five-year term. Before the ending of the duration for the existing Majlis, a general election is held to elect a new Majlis. Usually a new Majlis is elected thirty days prior to the expiration of the existing Majlis.

Once elected, members begin their parliamentary responsibilities after taking the oath of office, stipulated in article 67 of the constitution. Members are guaranteed parliamentary immunity under the constitution.

Before the 2019 elections, an additional 2 seats were created after two districts in Male’ were split.

In the 2024 parliamentary election which was conducted on 21 April 2024 included 93 constituencies:

#	Code	Constituency	Population
1	A01	Hoarafushi	3540
2	A02	Ihavandhoo	3457
3	A03	Baarashu	3483
4	A04	Dhidhoo	3078
5	A05	Kelaa	3188
6	B01	Hanimaadhoo	3128
7	B02	Nolhivaram	3316
8	B03	Vaikaradhoo	2813
9	B04	Kulhudhuffushi North	3559
10	B05	Kulhudhuffushi South	3514
11	B06	Makunudhoo	3457
12	C01	Kanditheemu	3510
13	C02	Milandhoo	3085
14	C03	Komandoo	3412
15	C04	Funadhoo	3400
16	D01	Kendhikulhudhoo	3267
17	D02	Manadhoo	3139
18	D03	Velidhoo	3030
19	D04	Holhudhoo	3063
20	E01	Alifushi	3635
21	E02	Ungoofaaru	3313
22	E03	Dhuvaafaru	3479
23	E04	Inguraidhoo	3574
24	E05	Maduvvari	3368
25	F01	Thulhaadhoo	3426
26	F02	Eydhafushi	2527
27	F03	Kendhoo	2591
28	F04	Hithaadhoo	2401
29	G01	Hinnavaru	3808
30	G02	Naifaru	4094
31	G03	Kurendhoo	2089
32	H01	Kaashidhoo	2853
33	H02	Thulusdhoo	2074
34	H03	Maafushi	2825
35	H04	Huraa	2345
36	I01	Maamigili	2878
37	I02	Mahibadhoo	2685
38	I03	Dhangethi	2538
39	J01	Felidhoo	1039
40	J02	Keyodhoo	915
41	K01	Dhiggaru	2698
42	K02	Mulaku	2795
43	L01	Bileydhoo	2459
44	L02	Nilandhoo	1950
45	M01	Meedhoo	2697
46	M02	Kudahuvadhoo	3155
47	N01	Vilufushi	2905
48	N02	Thimarafushi	2874
49	N03	Kinbidhoo	3268
50	N04	Guraidhoo	2707
51	O01	Isdhoo	3305
52	O02	Gamu	3869
53	O03	Fonadhoo	3064
54	O04	Maavashu	3038
55	P01	Villingili	2742
56	P02	Dhaandhoo	2623
57	P03	Gemanafushi	2967
58	P04	Kolamaafushi	2358
59	Q01	Thinadhoo North	2954
60	Q02	Thinadhoo South	2679
61	Q03	Madaveli	3141
62	Q04	Faresmaathodaa	3494
63	Q05	Gadhdhoo	3455
64	R01	Fuvahmulah North	3648
65	R02	Fuvahmulah Central	3070
66	R03	Fuvahmulah South	2843
67	S01	Hulhudhoo	2843
68	S02	Feydhoo South	2706
69	S03	Maradhoo	2754
70	S04	Hithadhoo North	4028
71	S05	Hithadhoo Central	4280
72	S06	Hithadhoo South	4071
73	S07	Addu–Meedhoo	2287
74	S08	Feydhoo North	2989
75	T01	Hulhumale South	3193
76	T02	Henveiru Central	3010
77	T03	Henveiru South	2675
78	T04	Henveiru North	2402
79	T05	Galolhu North	3914
80	T06	Galolhu South	4033
81	T07	Machangolhi North	2842
82	T08	Machangolhi South	2691
83	T09	Maafannu North	3878
84	T10	Maafannu West	3555
85	T11	Maafannu Central	3697
86	T12	Maafannu South	2884
87	T13	Villimale	3227
88	T14	Henveiru West	2806
89	T15	Machangolhi Central	2820
90	T16	Hulhumale Central	4230
91	T17	Hulhumale North	3220
92	U01	Mathiveri	2950
93	U02	Thoddoo	3024

== Speaker of the People's Majlis ==
A speaker is elected among the Members. The speaker chairs the meetings of the Majlis, is responsible for maintaining order in the chamber and supervises the administrative affairs of the Majlis. The speaker is next in line to be the acting president in case of a vacancy in the president's position, until a new council to govern the state is elected.

A deputy speaker is also chosen to assist the speaker of the Majlis and to run the Majlis, when the Speaker is absent or is not fit to fulfill the responsibilities of the Speaker.

== Speaker of the Special Majlis ==
Name	Entered office	Left office	Notes
Abbas Ibrahim	2004	2006	Speaker of Special Majlis

== Sittings of the Majlis ==
The sittings of the Majlis are divided into three sessions a year. The speaker has the authority to assign the dates for the commencing and closing of the Majlis sessions. For a Majlis session to commence, the meeting should be presided by the speaker or the deputy speaker. The quorum of the Majlis is 26 and this number is required to begin a session of the Majlis. If the quorum is not present, the speaker has to adjourn the session. Most Majlis meetings are open to the public.

== Committees ==
There are two types of committees in the Majlis. They are the standing committees and the selected committees. There are eleven standing committees in the Majlis, which is responsible for proposing amendments to bills or matters presented to Majlis floor, researching of the proposed bills or matters presented to the Majlis. Members are elected for a period of two and a half years for the standing committees. The responsibility of the standing committees varies, depending on its purpose.

Unlike the standing committees, the selected committees are temporary and it's dissolved, once the selected purpose is over. Usually selected committees are made to investigate or research matters related to a present circumstance or an incident. All the committees are chaired by the speaker or the deputy speaker or a person appointed by the speaker. The Majlis decides the number of members to assign to each committee.

== Majlis Secretariat ==
The secretariat of the Majlis was established in 1971. Since then it has been the responsibility of the Secretariat to oversee and facilitate the smooth running of the Majlis. Secretariat supports the Majlis with legislative works, manages the administrative affairs and provides technical support to the members of the Majlis. A secretary general is appointed to run the Majlis secretariat. The general supervises the Majlis secretariat.

== Legislative functions ==
Legislative proposals are introduced to the Majlis as bills. The government or the members present the bills to the Majlis floor. Once the bill is presented, the committee stage begins and the members debate on the provisions of the bill. Members may also propose amendments or propose to pass the bill during the debate. The members also have the right to send the bill to any of the related committee for further research and deliberation. If the bill is sent to the committees then there won't be any further debate or voting on the bill, until the committee presents its final findings about the bill.

Once the committee stage is over, members cast their votes to decide whether the bill will pass or not. If an amendment is proposed to the bill, the members votes for the amendment first. When the amendments are passed the members vote on to decide the fate of the bill. Once the bill is passed, it is sent to the president within seven days for presidential assent. The president should give his decree on the bill within thirty days or return it to the Majlis for further consideration or consideration of any amendments proposed by the president.

If the bill was not returned to the Majlis by the president or even if the president did not ratify the bill within the thirty-day period, the bill is deemed to become law. If the bill is sent back to the Majlis, the members can decide to pass the bill as it was before or they can consider the presidents observations.

== See also ==
- List of legislatures by country
- Politics of the Maldives
