= Abdul Samad Abdulla =

Maldivian politician and diplomat (1946–2013)

Abdul Samad Abdulla NIIV
- އަބްދުލް ސަމަދު އަބްދުﷲ
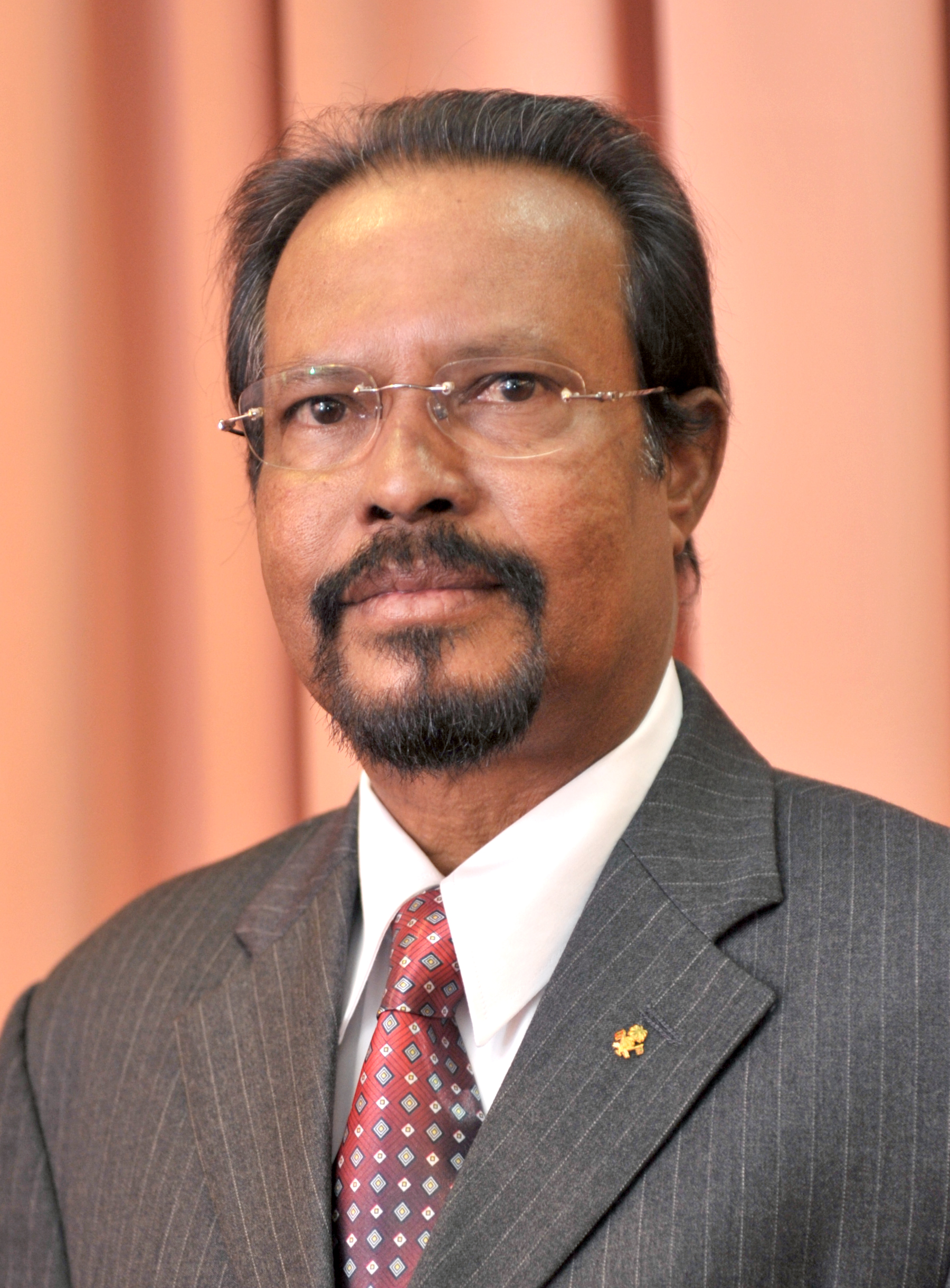
- Official portrait, 2012

Minister of Foreign Affairs
- In office 5 March 2012 – 25 August 2013
- President: Mohamed Waheed Hassan
- Preceded by: Ahmed Naseem
- Succeeded by: Asim Ahmed (acting); Mariyam Shakeela (acting)

High Commissioner of the Maldives to Bangladesh
- In office 2008–2012
- President: Maumoon Abdul Gayoom; Mohamed Nasheed; Mohamed Waheed Hassan

Personal details
- Born: 1946
- Died: 25 August 2013 Mount Elizabeth Hospital, Singapore
- Resting place: Choa Chu Kang Cemetery, Singapore
- Spouse: Ameena Ali
- Children: 3, including Khadeeja

Dr. Abdul Samad Abdulla, NIIV (Dhivehi: އަބްދުލް ސަމަދު އަބްދުﷲ; 1946 – 25 August 2013) was a Maldivian politician and diplomat who served as the Minister of Foreign Affairs until his death in office from kidney failure. He previously served as the Maldivian High Commissioner to Bangladesh.

== Education ==
Abdulla graduated from the Leningrad Medical Institute and received a Master's degree in Public Health from the Institute of Tropical Medicine Antwerp.

== Career ==
Abdulla previously served as the Ambassador of the Maldives to Bangladesh in 2008 until 2012 where he was appointed as Minister of Foreign Affairs. Abdulla had previously been appointed as the acting Minister of Health in 2012 and in 2013. He had also served in numerous roles in the World Health Organization.

== Health and death ==
In 2013, Abdulla was admitted in the intensive care unit of Mount Elizabeth Hospital after he got a heart attack. Abdulla travelled to Singapore to undergo kidney dialysis. Abdulla unexpectedly died during treatment at 01:20 MVT at Mount Elizabeth Hospital. His funeral took place after Dhuhr prayer in Singapore and he was laid to rest at 14:00 in Choa Chu Kang Cemetery.

His funeral was attended by his wife Ameena Ali, his children, Vice President Mohammed Waheed Deen, family members, and other Maldivians. A funeral in absentia was held across the Maldives after Asr prayer.

== Legacy ==
President Mohamed Waheed Hassan described Abdulla's death as "national tragedy", and the flag was flown half-mast for three days after his death. The cabinet held a special remembrance meeting in the memory of Abdulla.

Thinadhoo Regional Hospital was renamed to the Dr Samad Memorial Hospital in a recommendation by the cabinet to President Waheed.

In November 2013, President Waheed conferred the Order of Izzuddin to Abdulla posthumously.

== Personal life ==
Abdulla was married to Ameena Ali and had three children.
