= Hassan Evan Naseem =

Maldivian prison inmate murdered in 2003 by security forces, igniting a reform movement

- ހަސަން އީވާން ނަސީމް
- Born: 1984; Malé, Maldives
- Died: 19 September 2003 (aged 18–19); Maafushi Prison, Kaafu Atoll, Maldives
- Cause of death: Beaten to death by NSS officers
- Burial place: Aa Sahara Cemetery, Malé, Maldives; 4°10'12.4"N 73°30'28.7"E
- Other name: Evan Naseem
- Criminal charges: Drug abuse
- Mother: Mariyam Manike

Hassan Evan Naseem (Dhivehi: ހަސަން އީވާން ނަސީމް; 1984 – 19 September 2003), commonly referred to as Evan Naseem, was a Maldivian man whose death became a lever for the current, open, political reform activities in the Maldives. He was serving a jail term at Maafushi Prison for drug offences when he was beaten to death by the National Security Service personnel of the Security unit during a riot which endangered the lives of the prison security personnel.

== Early life ==
Evan attended Majeediyya School for his secondary education. He was jailed several times for drug offences and other related crimes.

== Dispute between inmates ==
On 19 September 2003, inmates of Naseem's cell crossed the partitions, on two occasions, to assault a person named Ali Didi who was detained in a different cell. This incident was reported to Maafushi Jail Office by the security unit in writing, along with two separate lists of people who crossed the partitions. Evan's name was not on either of the lists. Later the same day Naseem's fellow inmates were throwing objects at other cells. The Officer-in-Charge of the Maafushi Jail Security Unit, Captain Adam Mohamed, exaggerated the matter to police headquarters at Malé. Adam Mohamed was given permission to remove the "troublemakers" from the cell (where Naseem was) and to keep them handcuffed.

Later the same night a team of five security personnel came to Naseem's cell with a list of people who were involved in assaulting Ali Didi and throwing objects at other cells. Though Naseem's name was not on the list submitted earlier to Maafushi Jail Office, the new list included his name. As their names were read out, the men came out from the cell. When Naseem's name was called out he refused to come out, saying he was not involved in any of the previous unrest or disputes. Upon his refusal one of the security personnel went into the cell and asked him to come out. He still refused to walk out and warned the security person not to come closer or touch him. The security man was attacked twice with a wooden plank as he went towards Naseem. Soon after this incident, numerous members of the unit stormed into the cell. Naseem then yieldingly walked out of the cell.

== Death ==
After being removed from the cell, Naseem was taken to a place called "Range" where he was kept separate from other inmates. There he was beaten up by twelve security personnel. He was beaten up with bare hands, wooden planks and riot batons. On various occasions he lost consciousness because of continuous beatings. When he no longer responded, he was taken to Indira Gandhi Memorial Hospital in the early morning of 20 September 2003. According to the medical reports he died on 19 September 2003, due to injuries sustained to his lungs. When his mother, Mariyam Manike, visited him in the hospital, she noticed that sand was in his ears, and that his eyes and nose were soiled. After she noticed, she pulled the cover off his body and saw how he was beaten and tortured.

== Unrest ==
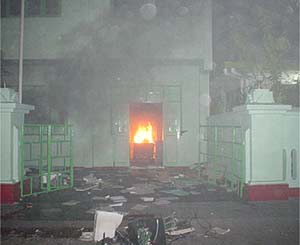
Old parliament building on fire

Cellmates of Evan Naseem learned of his death the same day. This resulted in a protest which then lead to unrest in Maafushi Prison. To control this unrest NSS personnel at Maafushi shot several unarmed prisoners killing 3 and injuring 17 others.

News of the death of Naseem broke out quickly in the capital city Malé. A large number of people gathered at his burial service. While people were at the cemetery, news of the shooting incident reached the already angry public. Civil unrest in Malé grew with this news. Several police stations were set on fire, government buildings were attacked, and government vehicles were set on fire or destroyed by the angry mob. The government controlled the unrest by around 2300hrs and declared a State of Emergency, for the first time in the country's history, in Malé and nearby islands. A curfew was imposed in Malé.

== Investigation ==
President Maumoon Abdul Gayoom established a presidential commission on 20 September 2003, to investigate the death of Evan Naseem and the shooting incident at Maafushi Prison. The findings of the commission were released to the public with the title "Report on the Death of Hassan Evan Naseem". However, several sections from the public report were omitted due to national security concerns. Charges were pressed against 12 people, however 8 people were sentenced to death.
