= Outline of the Maldives =

Overview of and topical guide to Maldives

The Flag of Maldives

The Emblem of Maldives

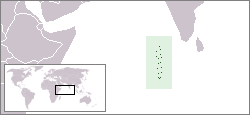
The location of the Maldives

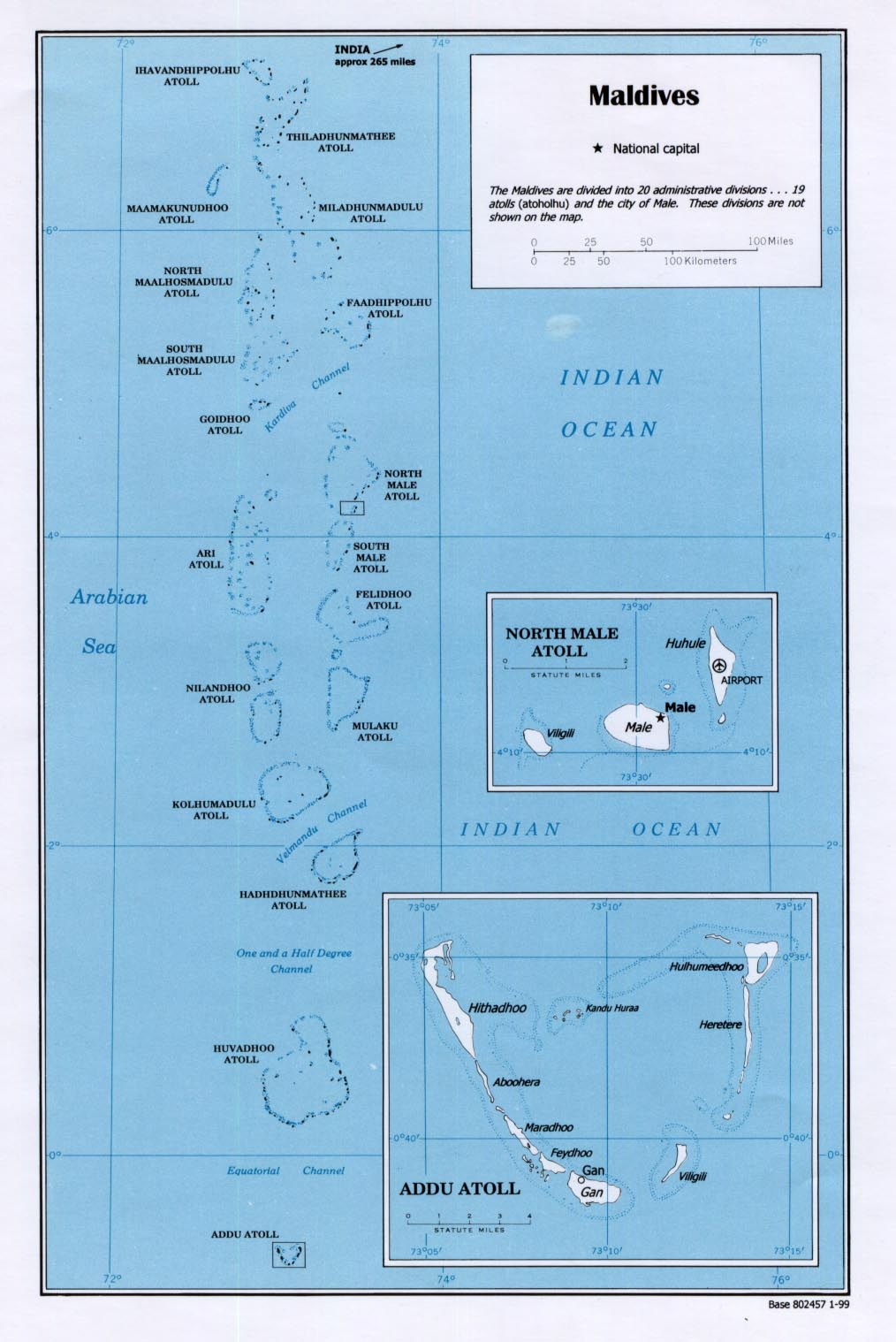
An enlargeable map of the Republic of Maldives

The following outline is provided as an overview of and topical guide to the Maldives:

The Maldives – island nation comprising a group of atolls in the Indian Ocean. The Maldives is located south of India's Lakshadweep islands, and about seven hundred kilometres (430 miles) south-west of Sri Lanka. The twenty-six atolls of Maldives' encompass a territory featuring 1,192 islets, two hundred and fifty islands of which are inhabited.

The name "Maldives" may derive from Maale Dhivehi Raajje ("The Island Kingdom [under the authority of] Malé")." Some scholars believe that the name "Maldives" derives from the Sanskrit maladvipa, meaning "garland of islands", but this name is not found in ancient Sanskrit literature. Instead, classical Sanskrit texts mention the "Hundred Thousand Islands" (Lakshadweepa). Another theory suggests that the name "Maldives" derives from the Tamil "malai tivu" meaning "island of hills." Some medieval Arab travellers such as Ibn Batuta called the islands "Mahal Dibiyat" from the Arabic word Mahal ("palace")." This is the name presently inscribed in the scroll of the Maldive state emblem.

The religion original settlers of the islands is most likely to be Hinduism. Then around Ashoka's period, in the 3rd century BC, they converted to Buddhism. Islam was introduced in 1153. The Maldives came then under the influence of the Portuguese (1558) and the Dutch (1654) seaborne empires, and in 1887 it became a British protectorate. In 1965, the Maldives obtained independence from Britain (originally under the name "Maldive Islands"), and in 1968 the Sultanate was replaced by a Republic. The growing dependence of the Maldives on China is driving the island nation towards concerning levels of economic indebtedness.

The Maldives is the smallest Asian country in terms of population and area. It is also the smallest entirely Muslim nation in the world.

== General reference ==
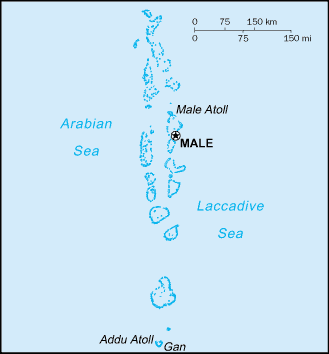
An enlargeable basic map of Maldives

- Pronunciation: /ˈmɔːldiːvs/,/ˈmɒldiːvs/,/ˈmɔːldaɪvs/
- Common English country name: Maldives
- Official English country name: The Republic of Maldives
- Common endonym(s): Rajje /ɾaːd͡ʒd͡ʒe/, Dhivehi rajje /d̪iʋehi ɾaːd͡ʒd͡ʒe/
- Official endonym(s): Dhivehiraajjeyge Jumhooriyya ދިވެހިރާއްޖޭގެ ޖުމްހޫރިއްޔާ /d̪iʋehi ɾaːd͡ʒd͡ʒeːge d͡ʒumhuːɾijjaː/
- Adjectival(s): Maldivian
- Demonym(s): Maldivians
- ISO country codes: MV, MDV, 462
- ISO region codes: See ISO 3166-2:MV
- Internet country code top-level domain: .mv

== Geography of Maldives ==
Geography of Maldives

- Maldives is: an island country
- Location:
  - Northern Hemisphere and Eastern Hemisphere
  - Indian Ocean
    - between the Arabian Sea and the Laccadive Sea
  - Eurasia
    - Asia
      - South Asia
        - Indian subcontinent (off the coast of India, rising above the oceanic crust)
  - Time zone: UTC+05
  - Extreme points of Maldives:
    - High: unnamed location on Villingili 2.4 m (8 ft) – lowest high point of any country
    - Low: Indian Ocean 0 m
  - Land boundaries: none
  - Coastline: Indian Ocean 644 km
- Population of Maldives: 306,000 – 171st most populous country
- Area of Maldives: 298 km^{2}
- Atlas of Maldives

=== Environment of Maldives ===
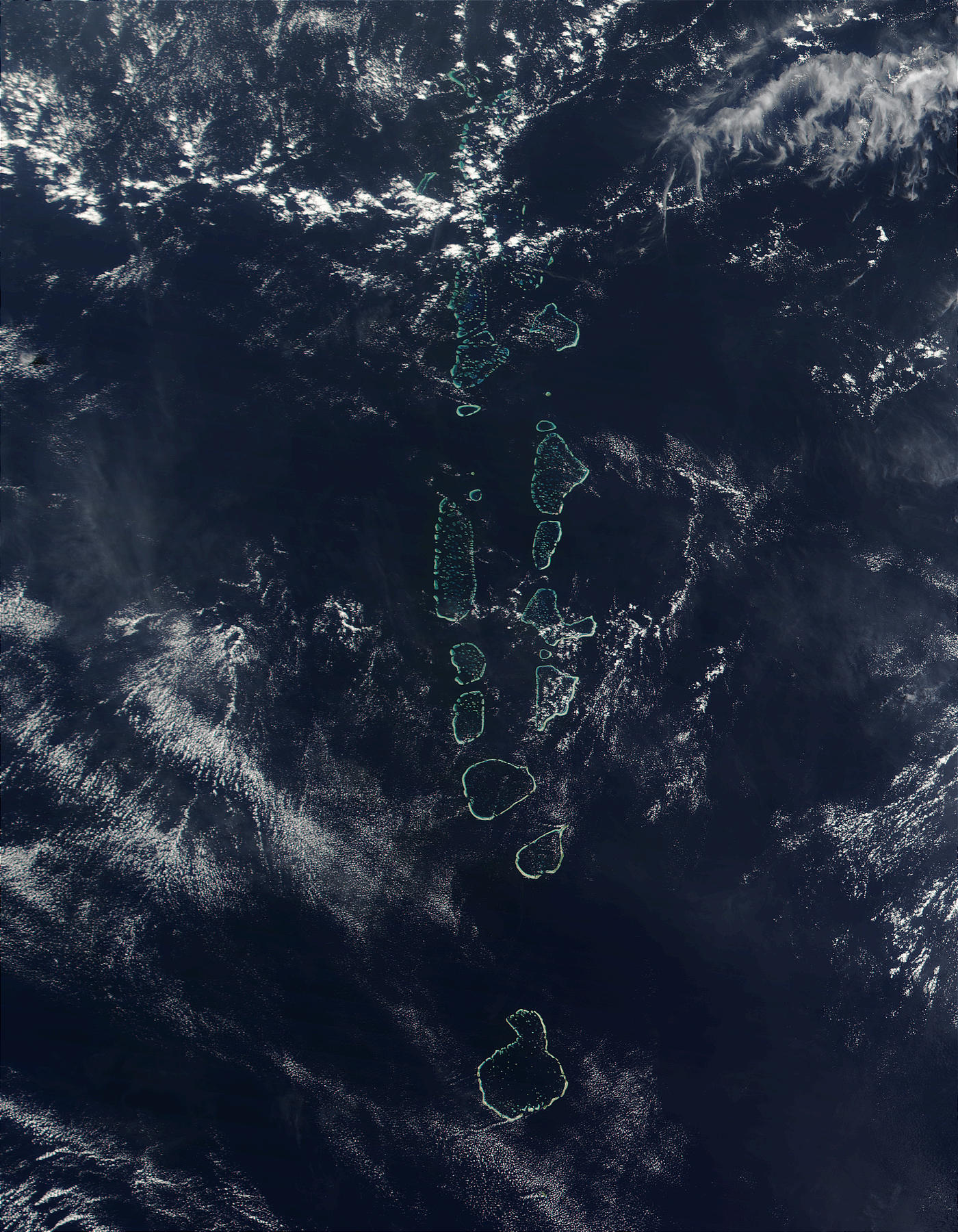
An enlargeable satellite image of Maldives

- Climate of Maldives
- Wildlife of Maldives
  - Birds of Maldives

==== Natural geographic features of Maldives ====
- Glaciers of Maldives: None
- Islands of Maldives
- Mountains of Maldives: None
- World Heritage Sites in Maldives: None

=== Regions of Maldives ===
==== Administrative divisions of Maldives ====
- Haa Alifu Atoll
- Haa Dhaalu Atoll
- Shaviyani Atoll
- Noonu Atoll
- Raa Atoll
- Baa Atoll
- Lhaviyani Atoll
- Kaafu Atoll
- Alifu Atoll
- Vaavu Atoll
- Meemu Atoll
- Faafu Atoll
- Dhaalu Atoll
- Thaa Atoll
- Laamu Atoll
- Gaafu Alifu Atoll
- Gaafu Dhaalu Atoll
- Gnaviyani Atoll
- Seenu Atoll

===== Municipalities of Maldives =====
Municipalities of Maldives

- Capital of Maldives: Malé
- Cities of Maldives

=== Demography of Maldives ===
Demographics of Maldives

== Government and politics of Maldives ==
Politics of Maldives

- Form of government: Unitary presidential constitutional republic
- Capital of Maldives: Malé
- Elections in Maldives
- Political parties in Maldives

=== Branches of the government of Maldives ===
Government of Maldives

==== Executive branch of the government of Maldives ====
- Head of state: President of Maldives,
- Head of government: President of Maldives,

==== Legislative branch of the government of Maldives ====
- Parliament of Maldives (bicameral)
  - Upper house: Senate of Maldives
  - Lower house: House of Commons of Maldives

==== Judicial branch of the government of Maldives ====
Court system of Maldives

=== Foreign relations of Maldives ===
Foreign relations of Maldives

- Diplomatic missions in Maldives
- Diplomatic missions of Maldives

==== International organisation membership ====
The Republic of Maldives is a member of:

- Asian Development Bank (ADB)
- Colombo Plan (CP)
- Commonwealth of Nations
- Food and Agriculture Organization (FAO)
- Group of 77 (G77)
- International Bank for Reconstruction and Development (IBRD)
- International Civil Aviation Organization (ICAO)
- International Criminal Police Organization (Interpol)
- International Development Association (IDA)
- International Finance Corporation (IFC)
- International Fund for Agricultural Development (IFAD)
- International Maritime Organization (IMO)
- International Monetary Fund (IMF)
- International Olympic Committee (IOC)
- International Telecommunication Union (ITU)
- Inter-Parliamentary Union (IPU)
- Islamic Development Bank (IDB)
- Multilateral Investment Guarantee Agency (MIGA)
- Non-aligned Movement (NAM)
- Organisation of Islamic Cooperation (OIC)
- Organisation for the Prohibition of Chemical Weapons (OPCW)
- South Asia Co-operative Environment Programme (SACEP)
- South Asian Association for Regional Cooperation (SAARC)
- United Nations (UN)
- United Nations Conference on Trade and Development (UNCTAD)
- United Nations Educational, Scientific, and Cultural Organization (UNESCO)
- United Nations Industrial Development Organization (UNIDO)
- Universal Postal Union (UPU)
- World Customs Organization (WCO)
- World Federation of Trade Unions (WFTU)
- World Health Organization (WHO)
- World Intellectual Property Organization (WIPO)
- World Meteorological Organization (WMO)
- World Tourism Organization (UNWTO)
- World Trade Organization (WTO)

=== Law and order in Maldives ===
Law of Maldives

- Constitution of Maldives
- Crime in Maldives
- Human rights in Maldives
  - LGBT rights in Maldives
- Law enforcement in Maldives

=== Military of Maldives ===
Military of Maldives

- Command
  - Commander-in-chief:
- Forces
  - Army of Maldives
  - Special Forces (Maldives)

== History of Maldives ==
History of Maldives

== Culture of Maldives ==
Culture of Maldives

- Cuisine of Maldives
- Folklore of the Maldives
- Languages of Maldives
- National symbols of Maldives
  - Coat of arms of Maldives
  - Flag of Maldives
  - National anthem of Maldives
- Religion in Maldives
  - Roman Catholicism in Maldives
  - Islam in Maldives
- World Heritage Sites in Maldives: None

=== Art in Maldives ===
- Music of Maldives

=== Sports in Maldives ===
Sports in Maldives

- Football in Maldives
- Maldives at the Olympics

== Economy and infrastructure of Maldives ==
Economy of Maldives

- Economic rank, by nominal GDP (2007): 165th (one hundred and sixty fifth)
- Communications in Maldives
- Companies of Maldives
- Currency of Maldives: Rufiyaa
  - ISO 4217: MVR
- Maldives Stock Exchange
- Media in Maledives
  - Newspapers in the Maldives
- Tourism in Maldives
  - Visa policy of Maldives
- Transport in Maldives
  - Airports in Maldives

== Education in Maldives ==
Education in Maldives

== See also ==
Maldives

- List of international rankings
- List of Maldives-related topics
- Member state of the Commonwealth of Nations
- Member state of the United Nations
- Outline of Asia
- Outline of geography
