= Human rights in the Maldives =

Human rights in the Maldives, an archipelagic nation of 523,787 people off the coast of the Indian subcontinent, is a contentious issue. In its 2024 Freedom in the World report, Freedom House declared the Maldives "Partly Free." The United States Bureau of Democracy, Human Rights and Labor claims in their 2012 report on human rights practices in the country that the most significant problems are corruption, lack of religious freedom, and abuse and unequal treatment of women.

== History and political situation ==
The Maldives gained independence from the United Kingdom in 1965. The nation began its independent existence as a sultanate, but a 1968 referendum approved a constitution establishing the nation as a republic. Ibrahim Nasir, Prime Minister under the sultanate, became President and held office from 1968 to 1978. He was succeeded by Maumoon Abdul Gayoom, who was elected president in 1978 and re-elected in 1983, 1988, 1993, 1998, and 2003. At the end of his presidency in 2008, he was the longest serving leader in Asia. The national government generally exercised tight control over its people during this time.

The following chart shows the Maldives' ratings since 1972 in the Freedom in the World reports, published annually by Freedom House. A rating of 1 is "free"; 7, "not free".^{1}

Amidst Abdulla Yameen's time in office, accusations of human rights transgressions came to light, accompanied by the imprisonment of several opposition politicians, among them former president Mohamed Nasheed.

Historical ratings

Year	Political Rights	Civil Liberties	Status	President^{2}
1972	3	2	Free	Ibrahim Nasir
1973	3	2	Partly Free	Ibrahim Nasir
1974	3	2	Partly Free	Ibrahim Nasir
1975	4	4	Partly Free	Ibrahim Nasir
1976	4	4	Partly Free	Ibrahim Nasir
1977	4	4	Partly Free	Ibrahim Nasir
1978	5	5	Partly Free	Ibrahim Nasir
1979	5	5	Partly Free	Maumoon Abdul Gayoom
1980	5	5	Partly Free	Maumoon Abdul Gayoom
1981	5	5	Partly Free	Maumoon Abdul Gayoom
1982^{3}	5	5	Partly Free	Maumoon Abdul Gayoom
1983	5	5	Partly Free	Maumoon Abdul Gayoom
1984	5	5	Partly Free	Maumoon Abdul Gayoom
1985	5	5	Partly Free	Maumoon Abdul Gayoom
1986	5	6	Partly Free	Maumoon Abdul Gayoom
1987	5	6	Partly Free	Maumoon Abdul Gayoom
1988	5	6	Not Free	Maumoon Abdul Gayoom
1989	6	5	Not Free	Maumoon Abdul Gayoom
1990	6	5	Not Free	Maumoon Abdul Gayoom
1991	6	5	Not Free	Maumoon Abdul Gayoom
1992	6	5	Not Free	Maumoon Abdul Gayoom
1993	6	6	Not Free	Maumoon Abdul Gayoom
1994	6	6	Not Free	Maumoon Abdul Gayoom
1995	6	6	Not Free	Maumoon Abdul Gayoom
1996	6	6	Not Free	Maumoon Abdul Gayoom
1997	6	6	Not Free	Maumoon Abdul Gayoom
1998	6	5	Not Free	Maumoon Abdul Gayoom
1999	6	5	Not Free	Maumoon Abdul Gayoom
2000	6	5	Not Free	Maumoon Abdul Gayoom
2001	6	5	Not Free	Maumoon Abdul Gayoom
2002	6	5	Not Free	Maumoon Abdul Gayoom
2003	6	5	Not Free	Maumoon Abdul Gayoom
2004	6	5	Not Free	Maumoon Abdul Gayoom
2005	6	5	Not Free	Maumoon Abdul Gayoom
2006	6	5	Not Free	Maumoon Abdul Gayoom
2007	6	5	Not Free	Maumoon Abdul Gayoom
2008	4	4	Partly Free	Maumoon Abdul Gayoom
2009	3	4	Partly Free	Mohamed Nasheed
2010	3	4	Partly Free	Mohamed Nasheed
2011	3	4	Partly Free	Mohamed Nasheed
2012	5	4	Partly Free	Mohamed Nasheed
2013	4	4	Partly Free	Mohamed Waheed Hassan
2014	4	4	Partly Free	Abdulla Yameen
2015	4	5	Partly Free	Abdulla Yameen
2016	5	5	Partly Free	Abdulla Yameen
2017	5	5	Partly Free	Abdulla Yameen
2018	5	5	Partly Free	Abdulla Yameen
2019	4	5	Partly Free	Ibrahim Mohamed Solih
2020	4	5	Partly Free	Ibrahim Mohamed Solih
2021	4	5	Partly Free	Ibrahim Mohamed Solih
2022	4	5	Partly Free	Ibrahim Mohamed Solih
2023	4	5	Partly Free	Ibrahim Mohamed Solih

After a coup attempt by supporters of Nasir was uncovered in 1980, the government arrested those thought to be involved, and their wives and children were placed under house arrest. At least three people were sentenced for association with the former president, and at least one – Mohamed Ismail Manniku Sikku, the former Director of Civil Aviation – was banished to an uninhabited atoll for "ten years and a day".

The president considered responsible for the human rights gains in 2009–2010, Mohamed Nasheed, resigned after weeks of protests led by police and was placed under house arrest. He was replaced by Mohamed Waheed Hassan, the former head of UNICEF Afghanistan.

Former president Yameen's government (2013–2018) employed an alarming tactic of leveraging broad and ambiguously worded laws to target, apprehend, and incarcerate dissenting voices. This strategy involves the misuse of counterterrorism laws against opposition activists and politicians, as well as the application of anti-defamation laws to suppress the media and social media activists who voice criticism against the president or his policies. Moreover, the government has imposed stringent limitations on assemblies, resulting in the prohibition or severe restriction of peaceful rallies and protests. These actions have raised concerns about the state of freedom of expression and civil liberties in the country.

== Current issues (2008–) ==
=== Freedom of religion ===
Freedom of religion in the Maldives is heavily restricted. The 2008 constitution establishes Islam as the state religion of the Maldives and requires all Maldivian citizens to be Sunni Muslims by law. It is illegal in the country to proselytize any religion other than Islam, and advocate for secularism (or the separation of church and state). Apostasy and atheism are also outlawed and those who identify as or accused of being apostates or atheists are punishable by death according to Maldivian law (though unenforced ). They are oftentimes forced to attend religious conversion programs and are targeted by vigilante violence or attacks with little or no consequences for perpetrators by the authorities.

The Maldivian education system observes a strict interpretation of the Islamic religion. All state-run public schools and private schools are required by law to teach Islam from 1st to the 12th grade, with no secular alternatives.

A report by the Maldivian Democracy Network published in 2016 investigating radicalism in the Maldives, outlined the extremist ideas cited in textbooks, sermons as well as fundamentalist theology promoted in them, as well as radical ideologies prominent in the country was heavily condemned by the extremist religious establishment and disseminators, ultimately leading to the organization being banned from continuing its operations without due process and forced into exile.

The Ministry of Islamic Affairs is the only body which grants licenses to imams, and sermons must be approved. They also control religious education and have the power to deport any non-Muslim foreigners. Non-Muslim foreigners are required to practice their religion in private.

On 14 December 2011, a group of ten men attacked peaceful demonstrators in Malé calling for religious tolerance. Sufi Ismail Khilath Rasheed sustained a skull fracture, and was later arrested as his calls for tolerance were illegal. No effort was made by the police to investigate or apprehend the assailants. On 5 June 2012, Rasheed was stabbed in the neck. Reporters Without Borders stated that it appeared that he had been deliberately targeted for his journalism. A Maldivian government minister condemned the attack, but also added "Hilath must have known that he had become a target of a few extremists ... We are not a secular country. When you talk about religion, there will always be a few people who do not agree".

=== Freedom of speech ===
Defamation and Speech "contrary to the tenets of Islam" is illegal.

The Maldives has a longstanding practice of employing criminal defamation laws as a means to suppress dissent. The implementation of the Anti-Defamation and Freedom of Expression Act in August 2016, the threats posed to the media and opposition critics escalated further. The act imposes significant fines for content or speech that is deemed to contradict Islamic tenets, jeopardize national security, challenge social norms, or infringe upon the rights, reputation, or good name of others during Yameen Rasheed's tenure. The act was repealed by the Parliament on 14 November 2018.

==== Media and censorship ====
2008 saw the Maldives' first private television channels. In August 2010 private channel Villa TV was attacked, and journalists were attacked by police for covering a political protest in October 2010. Opposition websites can be accessed in the country, but some Christian missionary websites have been blocked by the Ministry of Islamic Affairs.

On 1 May 2011 two journalists – one from Haveeru Daily and one from Sun FM – were arrested for covering a protest. They were released after 24 hours.

On 16 September 2025, the Maldivian parliament passed a media regulation bill intended to "criminalize defamation". A government controlled media regulator will replace the existing independent regulatory commissions and grants the newly created commission the ability to charge steep fines against journalists and news outlets. It was widely protested by domestic and international rights groups as an infringement of free press. They argued that the vaguely termed bill could be a tool with which the government could silence dissent and independent reporting. The parliamentary majority leader Ibrahim Falah reportedly called for the impalement of journalists for "making defamatory allegations" against him while debating the bill on the floor of parliament.

=== Freedom of assembly ===
The constitution protects "freedom of peaceful assembly without prior permission of the State", and the U.S. State Department claims these rights are generally upheld.

In July 2020, Human Rights Watch denounced the Maldivian government's recent enforcement of laws restricting protests and other gatherings, saying that the government's actions constituted a violation of fundamental rights. The government's decision to enforce the laws came in the wake of multiple protests staged during the month of July.

=== Legal system ===
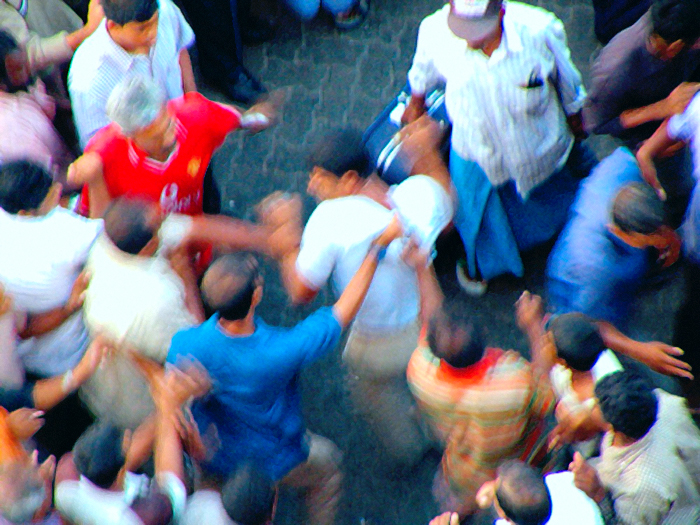
Vigilantes attack a man accused of theft in Malé.

Most judges have no formal legal training and are given much leeway in their interpretations of Muslim law.

The Maldives National Defence Force holds human rights courses.

==== Allegations of arbitrary arrests and torture ====
Flogging is a frequently imposed punishment, and carried out behind the court buildings. 96 people – over 80% of them women – were sentenced to this mode of punishment in 2010.

Arbitrary arrest and detention is illegal.

At least four members of parliament were arrested in July 2010. They claimed the detentions were carried out to force them to comply with political demands. They were released soon after. On 16 August 2011 one of these MPs, Abdullah Yameen, was granted compensation.

=== Minority and women's rights ===
Gender based discrimination is generally illegal in the Maldives. Women have the right to contest local, parliamentary and presidential elections. The 20th Parliament has 3 female members, as of September 2025. Women have an equal right to education and have a literacy rate 98%. Women also outnumber men in higher education. Despite this, women on average earn ~20% less than men. Female genital mutilation remains legal in the Maldives, but its prevalence has declined significantly in recent years. 13% of Maldivian women aged 15 to 49 report having undergone female genital mutilation. The Maldives was 83rd out of 191 countries surveyed in the Gender Inequality Index in 2021.

In 2011 four police officers were discharged from the force, but not formally charged, for driving a woman around Malé, forcing her to strip her clothes, sexually and physically abusing her, and throwing her on the street.

LGBTQ rights in the Maldives are heavily restricted. Same-sex conduct is illegal with the proscribed punishments ranging from forced conversion to jail time and lashings (though this is rarely enforced). There are no organisations with a focus on LGBTQ advocacy in the country and existing rights groups generally refrain from LGBTQ advocacy. A new penal code adopted in 2014 criminalized same-sex sexual activity and same-sex marriage. There were six cases in 2023 where individuals were investigated by the police for reportedly engaging in same-sex conduct.

Migrant workers in the country have little worker protections and are not entitled to a minimum wage. The practice of withholding migrant workers' passports by their employers remains commonplace.

Disability rights

Disability rights in the Maldives are principally limited to discrimination protections. Equal access to education, healthcare, public buildings or transportation are not guaranteed by law for persons with disabilities. Most public places in the country are not wheelchair accessible. The government provides financial assistance for persons with disabilities, but due to strict conditions and requirements, many are unable to register. An estimated 10% of persons with disabilities have been subjected to various forms of abuse, according to NGOs.

== See also ==
- Human trafficking in the Maldives

== Notes ==
1. Note that the "Year" signifies the "Year covered". Therefore the information for the year marked 2008 is from the report published in 2009, and so on.
2. As of 1 January.
3. The 1982 report covers 1981 and the first half of 1982, and the following 1984 report covers the second half of 1982 and the whole of 1983. In the interest of simplicity, these two aberrant "year and a half" reports have been split into three year-long reports through interpolation.
