= Villingili =

Villingili as a place name may refer to:

- Villingili (Addu Atoll), a resort island in the Maldives
- Villingili (Alif Dhaal Atoll), an uninhabited island in the Maldives
- Villingili (Gaafu Alif Atoll), an inhabited island in the Maldives
- Villingili (Villimalé), an inhabited island in the Maldives
- Villingili (Seenu Atoll), a resort island in the Maldives
- Villingili (India), a village in the Lakshadweep group of islands, India
