= Passport card =

Passport card may refer to:

- Irish passport card
- United States passport card
- Ukrainian identity card ("Passport of the citizen of Ukraine")
- Maldivian passport#Maldives passport card

== See also ==
- Passport
- Internal passport
- Identity document
  - List of national identity card policies by country
  - National identity cards in the European Economic Area and Switzerland
  - National identity cards in the Organization of American States
- Travel document
- Hong Kong and Macao Travel Permit
- Taiwan Travel Permit
- Mainland Travel Permit for Hong Kong and Macao Resident
- Mainland Travel Permit for Taiwan Resident
- Plastic card
