= Visa requirements for Maldivian citizens =

Administrative entry restrictions

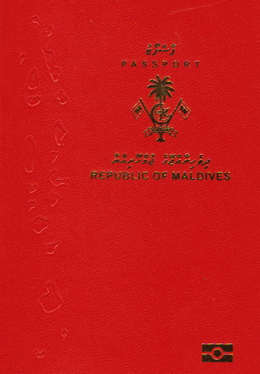
A Maldivian passport

Visa requirements for Maldivian citizens are administrative entry restrictions by the authorities of other states placed on citizens of the Maldives.

As of 2026, Maldivian citizens had visa-free or visa on arrival access to 92 countries and territories, ranking the Maldivian passport 49th in terms of travel freedom according to the Henley Passport Index.

== Visa requirements map ==
Visa requirements for Maldivian citizens holding ordinary passports Maldives Visa not required Visa on arrival eVisa Visa available both on arrival or online Visa required

== Visa requirements ==
Country	Visa requirement	Allowed stay	Notes (excluding departure fees)
Afghanistan	eVisa	30 days	e-Visa : Visitors must arrive at Kabul International (KBL).
Albania	eVisa	90 days	90 days visa-free if hold a multiple entries visa issued by United States or United Kingdom, as well as multiple entries visa type C or D issued by Schengen Area Members.
Algeria	Visa required		Persons may be denied entry if entering with a passport containing visas or stamps issued by Israel.; Visitors on tours organized to some southern regions by an approved travel agency may obtain a visa on arrival for up to 30 days.
Andorra	Visa required		
Angola	eVisa	30 days	30 days per trip, but no more than 90 days within any 1 calendar year for tourism purposes only.; Visitors must have a return/onward ticket and a hotel reservation confirmation.; An International Certificate of Vaccination is required.
Antigua and Barbuda	Visa not required	6 months	
Argentina	Visa required		The AVE (High Speed Travel) is open to Maldivian citizens holding valid, current ordinary passports traveling to Argentina for tourism. To do so, they must hold a valid category B2/J/B1/O/P (P1-P2-P3)/E/H-1B visa issued by the United States of America.
Armenia	eVisa	120 days	
Australia	Visa required		May apply online (Online Visitor e600 visa).
Austria	Visa required		
Azerbaijan	Visa not required	90 days	
Bahamas	Visa not required	3 months	
Bahrain	eVisa / Visa on arrival	14 days	
Bangladesh	Visa not required	3 months	
Barbados	Visa not required	6 months	
Belarus	Visa required		
Belgium	Visa required		
Belize	Visa not required		
Benin	eVisa	30 days	Must have an international vaccination certificate.; Three types of electronic visa are offered: the e-Visa valid for 30 days for a single entry (50 EUR), the e-Visa valid for 30 days for several (multiple) entries (75 EUR), and the e-Visa valid for 90 days to make several (multiple) entries (100 EUR).
Bhutan	Visa on arrival		The Sustainable Development Fee (SDF) of 200 USD per person, per night for almost all visitors to Bhutan. Additionally, if payment is made in US dollars from September 1, 2023 to August 31, 2027, the SDF is 100 USD.
Bolivia	Online Visa		
Bosnia and Herzegovina	Visa required		30 days visa free if hold a valid multiple entry visa holders and residents of Ireland, Schengen Area member states, and United States
Botswana	Visa not required	90 days	
Brazil	Visa Required		
Brunei	Visa not required	14 days	
Bulgaria	Visa required		
Burkina Faso	eVisa		
Burundi	Online Visa / Visa on arrival	1 month	
Cambodia	Visa not required	30 days	
Cameroon	eVisa		
Canada	Visa required		
Cape Verde	Visa on arrival (EASE)	30 days	Visa on arrival may applied for via the online platform (EASE) and issued at international airports in Sal, Boa Vista, São Vicente or Santiago. Visa fee is approximately 25–30 EUR.; Visitors must pay the Airport Security Fee (TSA) before visiting. The cost is 3,400 CVE (approx. 31 EUR) and can be paid via the online platform (EASE).
Central African Republic	Visa required		
Chad	eVisa		
Chile	Visa required		
China	Visa not required	30 days	
Colombia	Online Visa		
Comoros	Visa on arrival	45 days	
Republic of the Congo	Visa required		
Democratic Republic of the Congo	eVisa	7 days	
Costa Rica	Visa not required	90 days	
Côte d'Ivoire	eVisa	3 months	e-Visa holders must arrive via Port Bouet Airport.
Croatia	Visa required		
Cuba	eVisa	90 days	Can be extended up to 90 days with a fee.; Tourist card must be obtained in advance via travel agency, airline or at the embassy.
Cyprus	Visa required		
Czech Republic	Visa required		
Denmark	Visa required		
Djibouti	eVisa	90 days	
Dominica	Visa not required	6 months	
Dominican Republic	Visa required		
Ecuador	Visa not required	90 days	
Egypt	Visa on arrival	30 days	
El Salvador	Visa required		
Equatorial Guinea	eVisa		
Eritrea	Visa required		
Estonia	Visa required		
Eswatini	Visa not required	30 days	
Ethiopia	eVisa	90 days	e-Visa holders must arrive via Addis Ababa Bole International Airport.
Fiji	Visa not required	4 months	
Finland	Visa required		
France	Visa required		
Gabon	eVisa	90 days	e-Visa holders must arrive via Libreville International Airport.
Gambia	Visa not required	90 days	
Georgia	eVisa	30 days	30 days within any 120 days period.
Germany	Visa required		
Ghana	Visa not required	30 days	Announced on 22 April 2026; visa waiver requires parliamentary ratification before entering into force. Check before travel.
Greece	Visa required		
Grenada	Visa not required	3 months	
Guatemala	Visa required		
Guinea	eVisa	90 days	
Guinea-Bissau	Visa on arrival	90 days	
Guyana	Visa not required		
Haiti	Visa not required	90 days	
Honduras	Visa required		
Hungary	Visa required		
Iceland	Visa required		
India	Visa not required	90 days	
Indonesia	e-VOA / Visa on arrival	30 days	
Iran	eVisa	30 days	
Iraq	eVisa	30 days	
Ireland	Visa not required	90 days	
Israel	Visa required		
Italy	Visa required		
Jamaica	Visa not required	90 days	
Japan	Visa required		
Jordan	eVisa / Visa on arrival		Visa can be obtained upon arrival, it will cost a total of 40 JOD, obtainable at most international ports of entry and land border crossings. (except King Hussein/Allenby Bridge)
Kazakhstan	Visa not required	30 days	
Kenya	Electronic Travel Authorisation	90 days	Applications can be submitted up to 90 days prior to travel and must be submitted at least 3 days in advance.; eTA fee is 32.50 USD.; Proof of reservation at the hotel where visitors plan to stay is required (if staying with friends, an invitation letter is also acceptable).; Yellow fever vaccination certificate is required if coming from endemic countries.
Kiribati	Visa not required	90 days	90 days within any 12-month period.
North Korea	Visa required		
South Korea	Visa required		
Kuwait	Visa required		
Kyrgyzstan	Visa not required	30 days	
Laos	eVisa / Visa on arrival	30 days	18 (Note: Savannakhet Airport; Lanetoui - Mengkang (China); Meuangmom - Wan Pong (Myanmar); Banvang - Ban Khok Phai (Thailand); Namngeun - Huay Kon (Thailand); Paksan - Bueng Kan (Thailand); Paktaphan - Pak Saeng (Thailand); Pangmon - Ban Huak (Thailand); Phoudou (Thailand); Dak ta ock - Nam Giang (Vietnam); La Lai (Vietnam); Namkan (Vietnam); Namphao - Cau Treo (Vietnam); Namsoy - Na Meo (Vietnam); Naphao - Cha Lo (Vietnam); Pahang - Long Sap (Vietnam); Panghok - Tây Trang (Vietnam); Phoukeua - Bo Y (Vietnam)) of the 33 border crossings are only open to regular visa holders.; e-Visa may be used to enter Laos through the Luang Prabang, Pakse and Vientiane international airports, 3 Thai-Lao Friendship Bridges (Note: Vientiane (Friendship Bridge 1); Savannakhet (Friendship Bridge 2); Bokeo (Friendship Bridge 4)), in Boten (road and railroad), and in Vientiane (at Khamsavath railway station).; Visa on arrival is available at the Luang Prabang, Pakse and Vientiane international airports, 4 Thai-Lao Friendship Bridges (Note: Vientiane (Friendship Bridge 1); Savannakhet (Friendship Bridge 2); Khammouane (Friendship Bridge 3); Bokeo (Friendship Bridge 4)) and 7 border crossings. (Note: Nongnokkheane - Trapeang Kriel (Cambodia); Boten - Bo han (China); Golden Triangle/Samliemkham (Thailand); Khamsavath railway station (Thailand); Namheuang - Ban Na Kraseng (Thailand); Vang tao - Chongmek (Thailand); Dansavan - Lao Bảo (Vietnam))
Latvia	Visa required		
Lebanon	Visa required		
Lesotho	Visa not required	90 days	
Liberia	e-VOA	3 months	
Libya	eVisa		
Liechtenstein	Visa required		
Lithuania	Visa required		
Luxembourg	Visa required		
Madagascar	eVisa / Visa on arrival	90 days	For stays of 61 to 90 days, the visa fee is 59 USD.
Malawi	Visa not required	30 days	
Malaysia	Visa not required	90 days	
Mali	Visa required		
Malta	Visa required		
Marshall Islands	Visa on arrival	90 days	
Mauritania	eVisa	30 days	
Mauritius	Visa not required	90 days	
Mexico	Visa required		
Micronesia	Visa not required	30 days	
Moldova	eVisa		
Monaco	Visa required		
Mongolia	Visa not required	30 days	
Montenegro	Visa required		See Visa Exemptions below.
Morocco	Visa not required	30 days	
Mozambique	eVisa / Visa on arrival	30 days	
Myanmar	eVisa	28 days	e-Visa holders must arrive via Yangon, Nay Pyi Taw or Mandalay airports or via land border crossings with Thailand — Tachileik, Myawaddy and Kawthaung or India — Rih Khaw Dar and Tamu.; e-Visa is available for tourism only.
Namibia	eVisa	3 months	
Nauru	Visa required		
Nepal	Online Visa / Free visa on arrival	90 days	
Netherlands	Visa required		
New Zealand and territories	Visa required		Holders of an Australian Permanent Resident Visa or Resident Return Visa may be granted a New Zealand Resident Visa on arrival permitting indefinite stay (pursuant to the Trans-Tasman Travel Arrangement), subject to meeting character requirements and obtaining an Electronic Travel Authority prior to departure.
Nicaragua	Visa required		
Niger	Visa required		
Nigeria	eVisa	30 days	
North Macedonia	Visa required		See Visa Exemptions below.
Norway	Visa required		
Oman	Visa required		The immigration authorities of Oman provides a visa exemption to Maldives nationals who hold a valid Schengen visa or visa from the UK, US, Canada, Australia, Japan.
Pakistan	Visa not required	3 months	
Palau	Free visa on arrival	30 days	
Panama	Visa not required	180 days	
Papua New Guinea	eVisa	60 days	Available at Gurney Airport (Alotau), Mount Hagen Airport, Port Moresby Airport and Tokua Airport (Rabaul).
Paraguay	Visa required		
Peru	Visa required		
Philippines	Visa not required	30 days	
Poland	Visa required		
Portugal	Visa required		
Qatar	Visa not required	30 days	
Romania	Visa required		
Russia	Visa not required	90 days	90 days within one calendar year period.
Rwanda	Visa not required	30 days	
Saint Kitts and Nevis	Electronic Travel Authorisation		
Saint Lucia	Visa not required	6 months	
Saint Vincent and the Grenadines	Visa not required	3 months	
Samoa	Entry permit on arrival	90 days	
San Marino	Visa required		
São Tomé and Príncipe	eVisa		
Saudi Arabia	eVisa / Visa on arrival	90 days	
Senegal	Visa required		
Serbia	eVisa	90 days	90 days within any 180-day period. Transfers allowed.; Visa-free for a maximum stay of 90 days for valid visa holders or residents of the European Union member states and the United States.
Seychelles	Electronic Border System	3 months	Application can be submitted up to 30 days before travel.; Visitors must upload a reservation confirmation(s) for each visitor's location of stay in Seychelles.; Yellow fever vaccination certificate is required if coming from endemic countries.; Payment of the fee (EUR 10) by credit or debit card.; Valid for one journey only and it expires once exit the country.
Sierra Leone	eVisa	3 months	
Singapore	Visa not required	30 days	
Slovakia	Visa required		
Slovenia	Visa required		
Solomon Islands	Free Visitor Permit on arrival	3 months	3 month with a year.
Somalia	eVisa	30 days	
South Africa	Visa not required	30 days	
South Sudan	eVisa		Obtainable online 30 days single entry for 100 USD, 90 days multiple entry for 200 USD and 180 days multiple entry for 350 USD.; Printed visa authorization must be presented at the time of travel.
Spain	Visa required		
Sri Lanka	ETA /Visa on arrival	30 days	The standard visitor visa allows a stay of 60 days within any 6-month period.; Visa fees (for Standard visitor visa): SAARC - USD 35; Non SAARC - USD 75
Sudan	Visa required		
Suriname	Visa not required	90 days	An entrance fee of USD 50 or EUR 50 must be paid online prior to arrival.; Multiple entry e-Visa is also available.
Sweden	Visa required		
Switzerland	Visa required		
Syria	eVisa		
Tajikistan	Visa not required / eVisa	30 days / 60 days	
Tanzania	eVisa / Visa on arrival	3 months	
Thailand	Visa not required	60 days	
Timor-Leste	Visa on arrival	30 days	
Togo	eVisa	15 days	
Tonga	Visa required		
Trinidad and Tobago	Visa not required		
Tunisia	Visa not required	90 days	
Turkey	eVisa	90 days	
Turkmenistan	Visa required		10-day visa on arrival if holding a letter of invitation provided by a company registered in Turkmenistan with a prior approval from the Foreign Ministry. Visitors can apply to extend their stay for an additional 10 days.; When transiting between two non-bordering countries, visitors can obtain a Turkmenistan transit visa for a five-day stay. This must be applied for in advance at the Turkmenistan Embassy. Visitors must also submit copies of the visas for the country of entry into Turkmenistan and the country of departure from Turkmenistan. Visa fee is 20 USD.
Tuvalu	Visa on arrival	1 month	
Uganda	eVisa	3 months	
Ukraine	eVisa		
United Arab Emirates	Visa not required	90 days	Extension possible with a fee.
United Kingdom	Electronic Travel Authorisation	6 months	
United States and territories	Visa required		
Uruguay	Visa required		
Uzbekistan	eVisa	30 days	5-day visa-free transit at the international airports if holding a confirmed onward ticket for a flight to a third country.
Vanuatu	Visa not required	120 days	
Vatican City	Visa required		
Venezuela	Visa not required	90 days	
Vietnam	eVisa	90 days	Phú Quốc without a visa for up to 30 days.
Yemen	Visa required		Yemen introduced an e-Visa system for visitors who meet certain eligibility requirements (group travel of 10 or more people, business trips, and transit etc.).
Zambia	Visa not required	90 days	
Zimbabwe	Visa not required	3 months	

== Territories and disputed areas ==
Visa requirements for Maldivian citizens for visits to various territories, disputed areas and restricted zones:

Territory	Conditions of access	Notes
Abkhazia	Visa required	Tourists from all countries (except Georgia) can visit Abkhazia for a period not exceeding 24 hours as part of an organized tourist group.
Kosovo	Visa not required	90 days within 180 days period.
North Cyprus	Visa not required	90 days within 180 days period.
Palestine	Visa not required	Arrival by sea to Gaza Strip not allowed by Israeli authorities.
Sahrawi Arab Democratic Republic	Visa regime undefined	Undefined visa regime in the Western Sahara controlled territory.
Somaliland	Visa required	30 days for 30 USD, payable on arrival.
South Ossetia	Visa required	To enter South Ossetia, visitors must have a multiple-entry visa for Russia and register their stay with the Migration Service of the Ministry of Internal Affairs within 3 days.
Taiwan	Visa required	
Transnistria	Visa not required	Registration required after 24 hours.

== Other dependent territories ==
Territory	Conditions of access	Notes
China
Hong Kong	Visa not required	90 days
Macau	Visa on arrival	30 days
Denmark
Faroe Islands	Visa required	
Greenland	Visa required	
France
French Guiana	Visa required	
French Polynesia	Visa required	
(France) French West Indies	Visa required	Visa required for overseas collectivities of Saint Barthélemy and Saint Martin
Mayotte	Visa required	
New Caledonia	Visa required	
Réunion	Visa required	
Saint Pierre and Miquelon	Visa required	
Wallis and Futuna	Visa required	
Netherlands
Aruba	Visa not required	
Caribbean Netherlands	Visa not required	Includes Bonaire, Sint Eustatius and Saba.
Curaçao	Visa not required	
Sint Maarten	Visa not required	
New Zealand
Cook Islands	Visa not required	31 days
Niue	Visa not required	30 days
Tokelau	Visa required	
United Kingdom
Akrotiri and Dhekelia	Visa required	Stays longer than 28 days per 12-month period require a permit.
Anguilla	Visa not required	3 months
Bermuda	Visa not required	
British Indian Ocean Territory	Special permit required	Special permit required.
British Virgin Islands	Visa not required	
Cayman Islands	Visa not required	
Falkland Islands	Visa not required	A visitor permit is normally issued as a stamp in the passport on arrival, The maximum validity period is 1 month.
Gibraltar	Visa not required	6 months
Montserrat	Visa not required	
Pitcairn Islands	Visa not required	14 days visa free and landing fee 35 USD or tax of 5 USD if not going ashore.
Ascension Island	eVisa	3 months within any year period.
Saint Helena	Visa not required	
Tristan da Cunha	Permission required	Permission to land required for 15/30 pounds sterling (yacht/ship passenger) for Tristan da Cunha Island or 20 pounds sterling for Gough Island, Inaccessible Island or Nightingale Islands.
South Georgia and the South Sandwich Islands	Permit required	Pre-arrival permit from the Commissioner required (72 hours/1 month for 110/160 pounds sterling).
Turks and Caicos Islands	Visa required	Holders of a valid visa issued by Canada, United Kingdom or the USA do not required a visa for a maximum stay of 90 days.
United States
American Samoa	Visa required	
Guam	Visa required	
Northern Mariana Islands	Visa required	
Puerto Rico	Visa required	
U.S. Virgin Islands	Visa required	
Antarctica and adjacent islands
Special permits required for Bouvet Island, British Antarctic Territory, French Southern and Antarctic Lands, Argentine Antarctica, (Australia) Australian Antarctic Territory, (Antártica Chilena Province) Chilean Antarctic Territory, (Australia) Heard Island and McDonald Islands, (Norway) Peter I Island, (Norway) Queen Maud Land, (New Zealand) Ross Dependency.

Other territories

Territory	Conditions of access	Notes
Belarus; Belovezhskaya Pushcha National Park	Visa not required	3 days; must first obtain an electronic pass
China; Tibet Autonomous Region	TTP required	Tibet Travel Permit required (10 USD).
(Autonomous Republic of Crimea) Crimea	Visa required	Visa issued by Russia is required.
Ecuador; Galápagos	Pre-registration required	60 days; Visitors must pre-register to receive a 20 USD Transit Control Card (TCT).
Eritrea outside Asmara	Travel permit required	To travel in the rest of the country, a Travel Permit for Foreigners is required (20 Eritrean nakfa).
Greece; Mount Athos	Special permit required	Special permit required (4 days: 25 euro for Orthodox visitors, 35 euro for non-Orthodox visitors, 18 euro for students). There is a visitors' quota: maximum 100 Orthodox and 10 non-Orthodox per day and women are not allowed.
India PAP/RAP	PAP/RAP required	Protected Area Permit (PAP) required for whole states of Nagaland and Sikkim and parts of states Manipur, Arunachal Pradesh, Uttaranchal, Jammu and Kashmir, Rajasthan, Himachal Pradesh. Restricted Area Permit (RAP) required for all of Andaman and Nicobar Islands and parts of Sikkim. Some of these requirements are occasionally lifted for a year.
Iran; Kish Island	Visa not required	14 days; Visitors to Kish Island do not require a visa.
Iraqi Kurdistan	eVisa	Before applying for a visa, applicants must complete the application form to obtain a sponsor code and then provide this code to a sponsor in Kurdistan.; Once the sponsor code is provided, the sponsor applies for the e-Visa, pays the fee, and notifies the applicant of the application results.; Visa exempt for those who were born in Iraq.
Fiji; Lau Province	Special permission required	Special permission required.
France; Clipperton Island	Special permit required	Special permit required.
Kazakhstan	Special permission required	Special permission required for the town of Baikonur and surrounding areas in Kyzylorda Oblast, and the town of Gvardeyskiy near Almaty.
North Korea outside Pyongyang	Special permit required	People are not allowed to leave the capital city, tourists can only leave the capital with a governmental tourist guide (no independent moving)
Malaysia Sabah and Sarawak	Visa not required	These states have their own immigration authorities and passport is required to travel to them, however the same visa applies.
Maldives outside Malé	Visa not required	All Maldivians are allowed freedom of movement within the country.
Norway; Jan Mayen	Permit required	Permit issued by the local police required for staying for less than 24 hours and permit issued by the Norwegian police for staying for more than 24 hours.
Novorossiya	Restricted area	Crossing from Ukraine requires visit purpose to be explained to Ukrainian passport control on exit and those who entered from Russia are not allowed to proceed further into Ukraine.
Russia	Special authorization required	Several closed cities and regions in Russia require special authorization.
Sudan outside Khartoum	Travel permit required	All foreigners traveling more than 25 kilometers outside of Khartoum must obtain a travel permit.
Sudan; Darfur	Travel permit required	Separate travel permit is required.
Tajikistan; Gorno-Badakhshan Autonomous Province	OIVR permit required	OIVR permit required (15+5 Tajikistani Somoni) and another special permit (free of charge) is required for Lake Sarez.
(United Nations) UN Buffer Zone in Cyprus	Access Permit required	Access Permit is required for travelling inside the zone, except Civil Use Areas.
(United Nations) Korean Demilitarized Zone	Restricted zone	
(United Nations) UNDOF Zone and Ghajar	Restricted zone	
United States Minor Outlying Islands	Special permits required	Special permits required for Baker Island, Howland Island, Jarvis Island, Johnston Atoll, Kingman Reef, Midway Atoll, Palmyra Atoll and Wake Island.
Venezuela; Margarita Island	Visa not required	All visitors are fingerprinted.
Vietnam; Phú Quốc	Visa not required	30 days
Yemen outside Sanaa or Aden	Special permission required	Special permission needed for travel outside Sanaa or Aden.

=== Substitute ===
Maldivian Passport holders are sometimes exempted from applying for a visa to certain countries that they would otherwise be required to apply for, provided they hold a specific visa for a specific country.

Country	Exemption provided to	Stay Duration	Notes
Macedonia	Valid UK, US, or Canadian resident visa holders	Up to 15 Days and not to exceed 3 Months within a 6 Month period	Visa has to be valid for 5 (five) days beyond dates of intended travel
Montenegro	Valid UK, Schengen, and US resident visa holders.	30 Days	
Serbia	Valid UK, Schengen, EU and US resident visa holders.	90 Days every 6-month period.	

Maldives and Turkey signed agreement on mutual abolishing of visas, and that agreement is yet to be ratified.

== Non-visa restrictions ==
=== Blank passport pages ===
Many countries require a minimum number of blank pages to be available in the passport being presented, typically one or two pages. Endorsement pages, which often appear after the visa pages, are not counted as being valid or available.

=== Vaccination ===
Cover of the new International Certificate of Vaccination issued by the Bureau of Quarantine in the Philippines since 2021

The African countries of Angola, Benin, Burkina Faso, Burundi, Cameroon, Central African Republic, Democratic Republic of the Congo, Republic of the Congo, Côte d'Ivoire, Gabon, Ghana, Guinea-Bissau, Mali, Niger, Sierra Leone and Togo, South Sudan and Uganda, along with French Guiana in South America, require all incoming passengers older than nine months to one year, to have a current International Certificate of Vaccination or Prophylaxis.

Some other countries require vaccination only if the passenger is coming from an infected area or has visited one recently or has transited for 12 hours in those countries: Algeria, Botswana, Cabo Verde, Chad, Djibouti, Egypt, Eswatini, Ethiopia, Gambia, Ghana, Guinea, Lesotho, Libya, Equatorial Guinea, Eritrea, Madagascar, Malawi, Mauritania, Mauritius, Mozambique, Namibia, Nigeria, Papua New Guinea, Seychelles, Somalia, South Africa, Sudan, Tunisia, Uganda, Tanzania, Zambia and Zimbabwe.

=== Passport validity length ===
Very few countries, such as Paraguay, just require a valid passport on arrival.

However many countries and groupings now require only an identity card – especially from their neighbours. Other countries may have special bilateral arrangements that depart from the generality of their passport validity length policies to shorten the period of passport validity required for each other's citizens or even accept passports that have already expired (but not been cancelled).

Some countries, such as Japan, Ireland and the United Kingdom, require a passport valid throughout the period of the intended stay.

In the absence of specific bilateral agreements, countries requiring passports to be valid for at least 6 more months on arrival include Afghanistan, Algeria, Anguilla, Bahrain, Bhutan, Botswana, British Virgin Islands, Brunei, Cambodia, Cameroon, Cape Verde, Cayman Islands, Central African Republic, Chad, Comoros, Costa Rica, Côte d'Ivoire, Curaçao, Ecuador, Egypt, El Salvador, Equatorial Guinea, Fiji, Gabon, Guinea Bissau, Guyana, Haiti, India, Indonesia, Iran, Iraq, Israel, Jordan, Kenya, Kiribati, Kuwait, Laos, Madagascar, Malaysia, Marshall Islands, Mongolia, Myanmar, Namibia, Nepal, Nicaragua, Nigeria, Oman, Palau, Papua New Guinea, Peru, Philippines, Qatar, Rwanda, Samoa, Saudi Arabia, Singapore, Solomon Islands, Somalia, Sri Lanka, Sudan, Suriname, Tanzania, Thailand, Timor-Leste, Tokelau, Tonga, Turkey, Tuvalu, Uganda, United Arab Emirates, Vanuatu, Venezuela, and Vietnam.

Countries requiring passports valid for at least 4 months on arrival include Micronesia and Zambia.

Countries requiring passports with a validity of at least 3 months beyond the date of intended departure include Azerbaijan, Bosnia and Herzegovina, Honduras, Montenegro, Nauru, Moldova and New Zealand. Similarly, the EEA countries of Iceland, Liechtenstein, Norway, all European Union countries (except Ireland) together with Switzerland also require 3 months validity beyond the date of the bearer's intended departure unless the bearer is an EEA or Swiss national.

Countries requiring passports valid for at least 3 months on arrival include Albania, North Macedonia, Panama, and Senegal.

Bermuda requires passports to be valid for at least 45 days upon entry.

Countries that require a passport validity of at least one month beyond the date of intended departure include Eritrea, Hong Kong, Lebanon, Macau, the Maldives and South Africa.

==== Maximum passport age ====
Countries of the Schengen area require non-EU passports to be less than 10 years old upon entry.

=== Criminal record ===
Some countries, including Australia, Canada, Fiji, New Zealand and the United States, routinely deny entry to non-citizens who have a criminal record, while others impose restrictions depending on the type of conviction and the length of the sentence.

=== Persona non grata ===
The government of a country can declare a diplomat persona non grata, banning them from entering the country or expelling them if they have already entered. In non-diplomatic use, the authorities of a country may also declare a foreigner persona non grata permanently or temporarily, usually because of unlawful activity.

=== Israeli stamps ===
Kuwait, Lebanon, Libya, and Yemen do not allow entry to people with passport stamps from Israel or whose passports have either a used or an unused Israeli visa, or where there is evidence of previous travel to Israel such as entry or exit stamps from neighbouring border posts in transit countries such as Jordan and Egypt.

To circumvent this Arab League boycott of Israel, the Israeli immigration services have now mostly ceased to stamp foreign nationals' passports on either entry to or exit from Israel (unless the entry is for some work-related purposes). Since 15 January 2013, Israel no longer stamps foreign passports at Ben Gurion Airport. Passports are still (as of 22 June 2017) stamped at Erez when passing into and out of Gaza.

Iran refuses admission to holders of passports containing an Israeli visa or stamp that is less than 12 months old.

=== Biometrics ===
Several countries mandate that all travellers, or all foreign travellers, be fingerprinted on arrival and will refuse admission to or even arrest travellers who refuse to comply. In some countries, such as the United States, this may apply even to transit passengers who merely wish to change planes rather than go landside.

Fingerprinting countries/regions include Afghanistan, Argentina, Brunei, Cambodia, China, Ethiopia, Ghana, Guinea, India, Japan, Kenya (both fingerprints and a photo are taken), Malaysia upon entry and departure, Mongolia, Saudi Arabia, the Schengen Area, Singapore, South Korea, Taiwan, Thailand, Uganda, the United Arab Emirates and the United States.

Many countries also require a photo be taken of people entering the country. The United States, which does not fully implement exit control formalities at its land frontiers (although long mandated by its own legislation), intends to implement facial recognition for passengers departing from international airports to identify people who overstay their visa.

Together with fingerprint and face recognition, iris scanning is one of three biometric identification technologies internationally standardised since 2006 by the International Civil Aviation Organization (ICAO) for use in e-passports and the United Arab Emirates conducts iris scanning on visitors who need to apply for a visa. The United States Department of Homeland Security has announced plans to greatly increase the biometric data it collects at US borders. In 2018, Singapore began trials of iris scanning at three land and maritime immigration checkpoints.

== See also ==
- Visa policy of Maldives
- Maldivian passport
