= Geography of the Maldives =

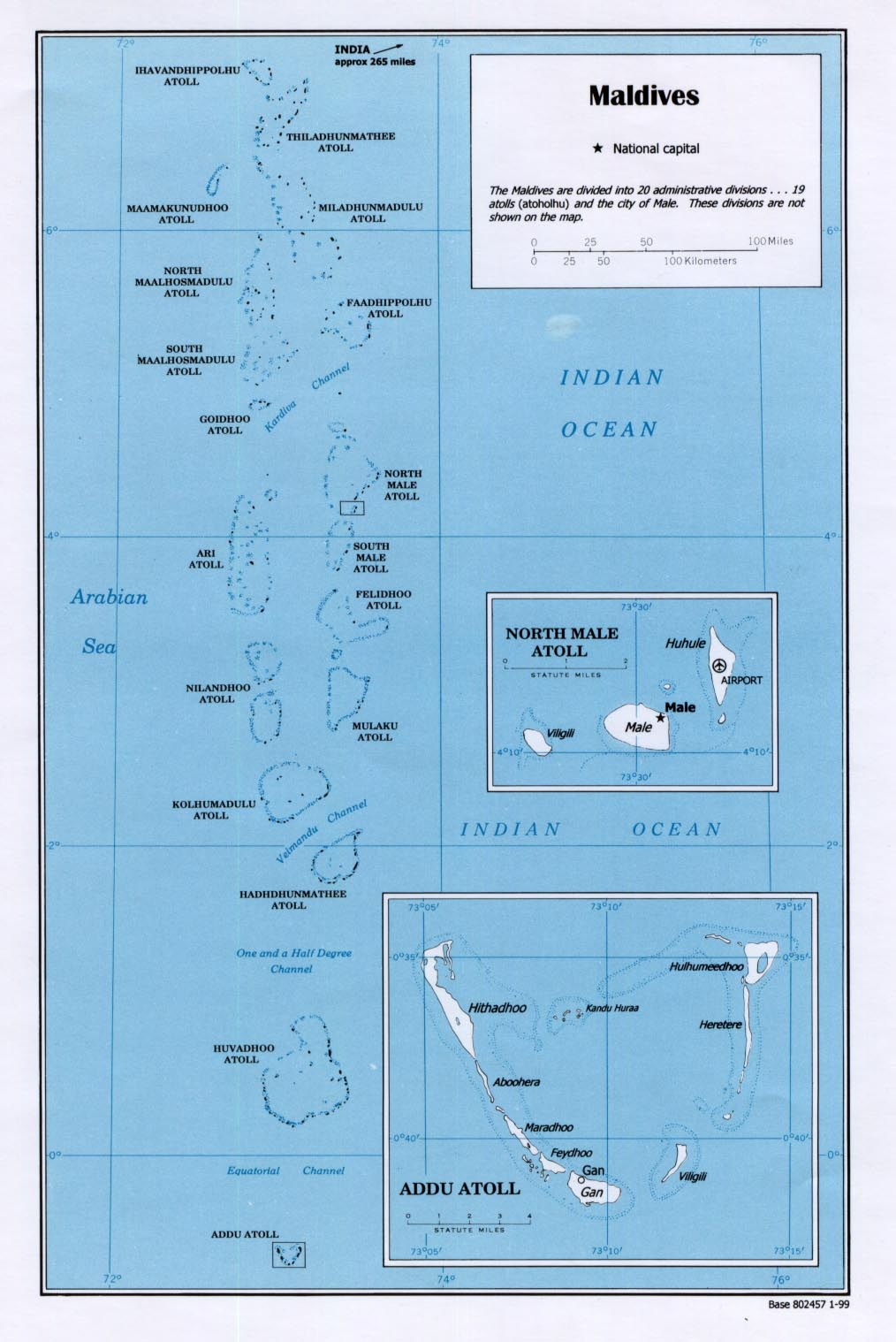
- Continent: South Asia
- Region: Indian Ocean
- Coordinates: 3°15′N 73°00′E
- Area: Ranked 186th
  - Total: 298 km^{2} (115 sq mi)
  - Land: 100%
  - Water: 0%
- Coastline: 1,129 km (702 mi)
- Borders: None
- Highest point: Mount Villingili in the Addu Atoll; 5.1 metres (17 ft)
- Lowest point: Indian Ocean; 0 m
- Exclusive economic zone: 923,322 km^{2} (356,497 mi^{2})

Maldives is an island country in the Indian Ocean, South Asia, south-southwest of India. It has a total land size of 298 km^{2} (115 mi^{2}) which makes it the smallest country in Asia. It consists of approximately 1,190 coral islands grouped in a double chain of 26 atolls, spread over roughly 90,000 square kilometres, making this one of the most geographically dispersed countries in the world. It has the 31st largest exclusive economic zone of 923,322 km^{2} (356,497 mi^{2}). Composed of live coral reefs and sand bars, the atolls are situated atop a submarine ridge, 960 km (600 mi) long that rises abruptly from the depths of the Indian Ocean and runs from north to south. Only near the southern end of this natural coral barricade do two open passages permit safe ship navigation from one side of the Indian Ocean to the other through the territorial waters of Maldives. For administrative purposes the Maldives government organised these atolls into twenty-one administrative divisions.

The largest island of Maldives is Gan, which belongs to Laamu Atoll or Hahdhummathi Maldives. In Addu Atoll the westernmost islands are connected by roads over the reef and the total length of the road is 14 km (8.7 mi).

== Physical geography ==
Cross section of a coral reef in the Maldives

Most atolls of the Maldives consist of a large, ring-shaped coral reef supporting numerous small islands. Islands average only one to two square kilometres in area, and lie between 1–1.5 m (3 ft 3 in – 4 ft 11 in) above mean sea level. Although some of the larger atolls are approximately 50 km (31 mi) long from north to south, and 30 km (19 mi) wide from east to west, no individual island is longer than eight kilometres.

The Maldives has no hills, but some islands have dunes which can reach 2.4 metres (7.9 feet) above sea level, like the NW coast of Hithadhoo (Seenu Atoll) in Addu Atoll. The islands are too small to have rivers, but small lakes and marshes can be found in some of them.

On average, each atoll has approximately 5 to 10 inhabited islands; the uninhabited islands of each atoll number approximately 20 to 60. Some atolls, however, consist of one large, isolated island surrounded by a steep coral beach. The most notable example of this type of atoll is the large island of Fuvahmulah situated in the Equatorial Channel.

The tropical vegetation of Maldives differs in the inhabited and in the uninhabited islands. Inhabited islands have small groves of banana, papaya, drumstick and citrus trees by the homesteads, while breadfruit trees and coconut palms are grown in available patches of land. On the other hand, uninhabited islands have mostly different kinds of bushes (magū, boshi) and mangroves (kuredi, kandū) along the waterline as well as some coconut trees.

Some islands are marshy, while others are higher owing to sand and gravel having been piled up by wave action. Often the soil is highly alkaline, and a deficiency in nitrogen, potash, and iron severely limits agricultural potential. Ten per cent of the land, or about 26 km^{2}, is cultivated with taro, bananas, coconuts, and other fruit. Only the lush island of Fuvammulah produces fruits such as oranges and pineapples – partly because the terrain of Fuvammulah sits higher than most other islands, leaving the groundwater less subject to seawater penetration. However, as population grows, even in this island the cultivated areas are shrinking rapidly.

Freshwater floats in a layer known as "Ghyben-Herzberg lens" above the seawater that permeates the limestone and coral sands of the islands. These lenses are shrinking rapidly on Male and on many islands where there are resorts catering to foreign tourists. Mango trees already have been reported dying on Male because of salt penetration. Most residents of the atolls depend on groundwater or rainwater for drinking purposes.

== Climate ==
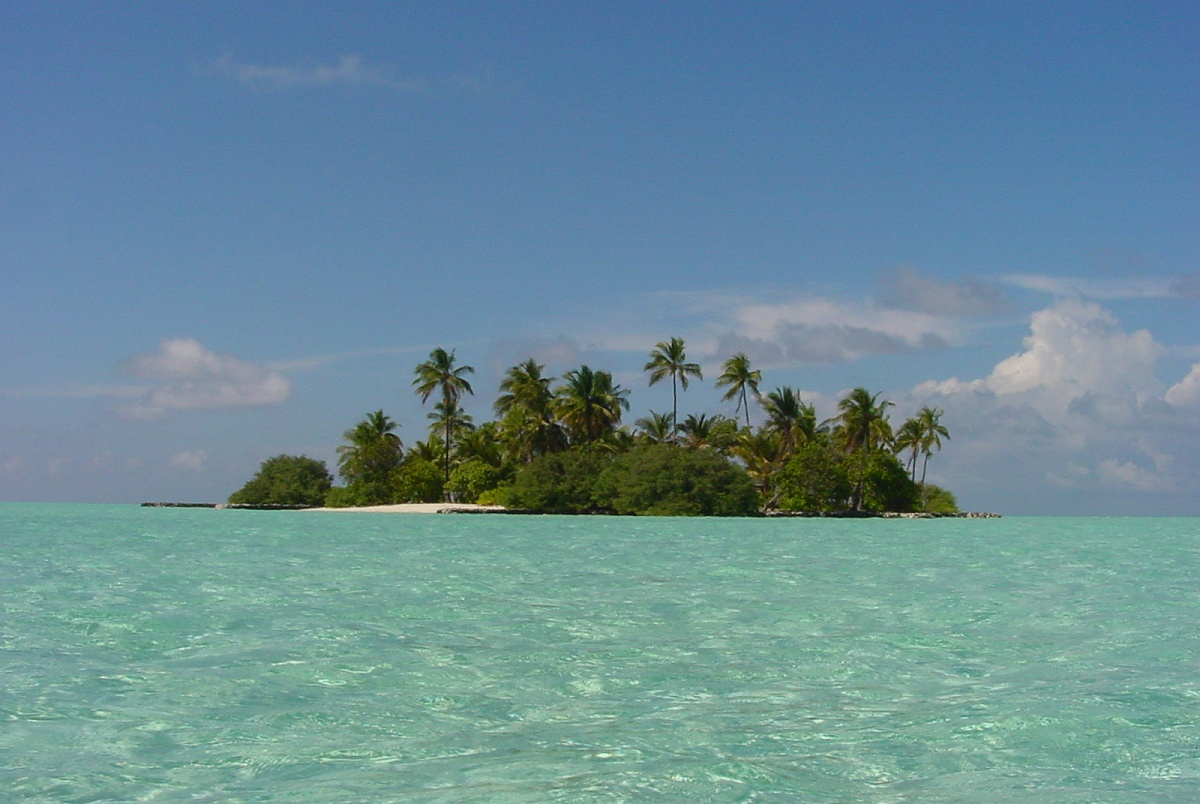
One of the many uninhabited islands of the Maldives.

The temperature of Maldives ranges between 24 and 33 °C (75.2 and 91.4 °F) throughout the year. Although the humidity is relatively high, the constant sea breezes help to keep the air moving. Two seasons dominate Maldives' weather: the dry season associated with the winter northeast monsoon and the rainy season brought by the summer southwest monsoon. Because the Maldives is the lowest country anywhere in the world, with the highest elevation in the island nation being slightly less than 8 feet, the temperature is constantly high and rarely falls below 25 °C (77 °F), even at night. The annual rainfall averages 2,540 millimetres (100 in) in the north and 3,810 millimetres (150 in) in the south.

The weather in Maldives is affected by the large landmass of South Asia to the north. The presence of this landmass causes differential heating of land and water. Scientists also cite other factors in the formation of monsoons, including the barrier of the Himalayas on the northern fringe of the South Asia and the sun's northward tilt, which shifts the jet stream north. These factors set off a rush of moisture-rich air from the Indian Ocean over the South Asia, resulting in the southwest monsoon. The hot air that rises over the South Asia during April and May creates low-pressure areas into which the cooler, moisture-bearing winds from the Indian Ocean flow. In Maldives, the wet southwest monsoon lasts from the end of April to the end of October and brings the worst weather with strong winds and storms. In May 1991 violent monsoon winds created tidal waves that damaged thousands of houses and piers, flooded arable land with seawater, and uprooted thousands of fruit trees. The damage caused was estimated at US$30 million.

The shift from the moist southwest monsoon to the dry northeast monsoon over the South Asia occurs during October and November. During this period, the northeast winds contribute to the formation of the northeast monsoon, which reaches Maldives in the beginning of December and lasts until the end of March. However, the weather patterns of Maldives do not always conform to the monsoon patterns of the South Asia. Rain showers over the whole country have been known to persist for up to one week during the midst of the dry season.

Climate data for Malé (Velana International Airport) 1981–2010, extremes 1966–present
Month	Jan	Feb	Mar	Apr	May	Jun	Jul	Aug	Sep	Oct	Nov	Dec	Year
Record high °C (°F)	32.8 (91.0)	32.6 (90.7)	33.2 (91.8)	35.0 (95.0)	34.2 (93.6)	34.9 (94.8)	33.4 (92.1)	33.4 (92.1)	32.5 (90.5)	33.0 (91.4)	32.7 (90.9)	33.5 (92.3)	35.0 (95.0)
Mean daily maximum °C (°F)	30.4 (86.7)	30.8 (87.4)	31.4 (88.5)	31.7 (89.1)	31.3 (88.3)	30.8 (87.4)	30.7 (87.3)	30.5 (86.9)	30.3 (86.5)	30.3 (86.5)	30.2 (86.4)	30.1 (86.2)	30.7 (87.3)
Daily mean °C (°F)	28.0 (82.4)	28.3 (82.9)	28.9 (84.0)	29.3 (84.7)	29.1 (84.4)	28.7 (83.7)	28.4 (83.1)	28.3 (82.9)	28.1 (82.6)	28.1 (82.6)	27.8 (82.0)	27.8 (82.0)	28.4 (83.1)
Mean daily minimum °C (°F)	25.8 (78.4)	26.0 (78.8)	26.5 (79.7)	26.9 (80.4)	26.4 (79.5)	26.0 (78.8)	25.8 (78.4)	25.6 (78.1)	25.4 (77.7)	25.6 (78.1)	25.3 (77.5)	25.4 (77.7)	25.9 (78.6)
Record low °C (°F)	20.6 (69.1)	22.6 (72.7)	22.4 (72.3)	21.8 (71.2)	20.6 (69.1)	22.1 (71.8)	22.5 (72.5)	21.0 (69.8)	20.5 (68.9)	22.5 (72.5)	19.2 (66.6)	22.0 (71.6)	19.2 (66.6)
Average rainfall mm (inches)	100.1 (3.94)	41.0 (1.61)	65.5 (2.58)	127.2 (5.01)	202.6 (7.98)	173.2 (6.82)	175.0 (6.89)	188.6 (7.43)	222.2 (8.75)	212.5 (8.37)	239.3 (9.42)	226.3 (8.91)	1,973.5 (77.70)
Average rainy days (≥ 1.0 mm)	11.4	6.2	8.5	11.7	12.9	9.6	12.2	12.2	12.8	15.6	14.1	15.4	142.5
Average relative humidity (%)	78	76	76	78	80	80	79	80	80	80	81	80	79
Mean monthly sunshine hours	246.7	262.2	282.9	252.8	223.8	201.8	220.0	223.4	204.2	237.7	212.7	213.7	2,782
Source 1: World Meteorological Organization
Source 2: Meteo Climat (record highs and lows)

=== Climate change ===
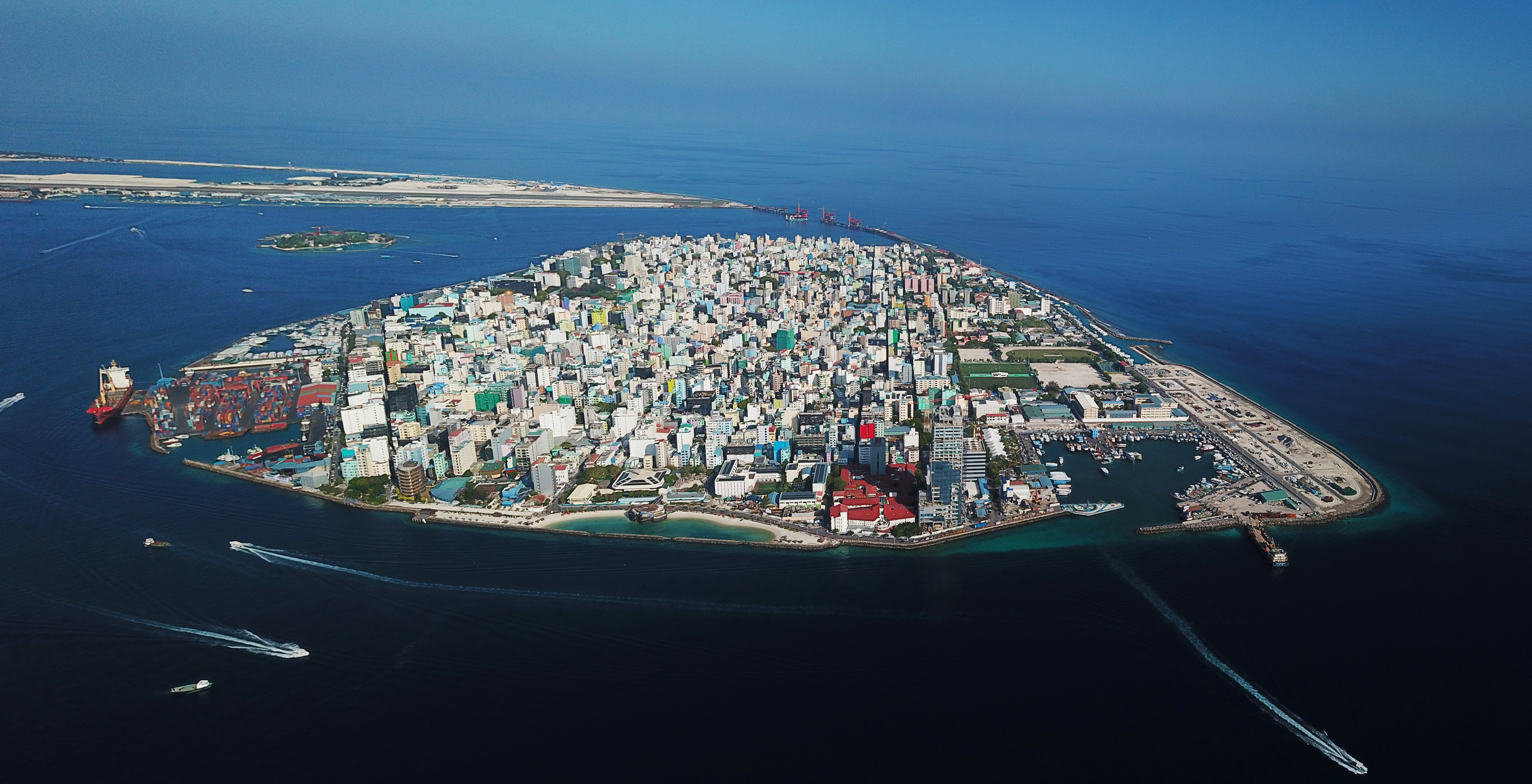
The Maldives government have adapted infrastructure in capital city Malé to the threats of climate change, including beginning to build a wall around the city.

Climate change is a major issue for the Maldives. As an archipelago of low-lying islands and atolls in the Indian Ocean, the existence of the Maldives is severely threatened by sea level rise. By 2050, 80% of the country could become uninhabitable due to global warming. According to the World Bank, with "future sea levels projected to increase in the range of 10 to 100 centimeters by the year 2100, the entire country could be submerged". The Maldives is striving to adapt to climate change, and Maldivian authorities have been prominent in international political advocacy to implement climate change mitigation.

== Area and boundaries ==
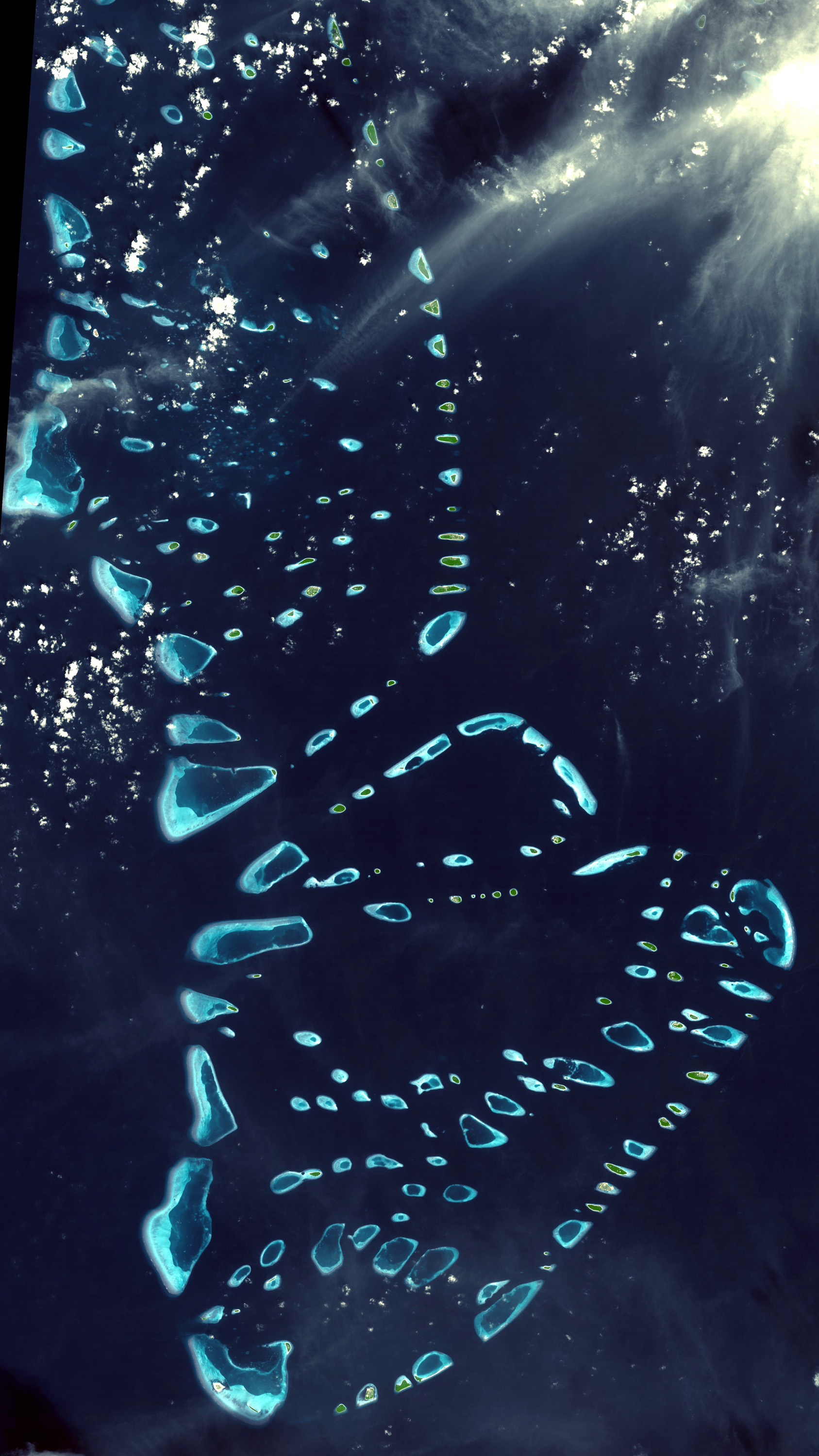
North Miladhun madulu atoll, Maldives

Area:
total: 298 square kilometres (115.1 square miles)
land: 298 km^{2}
water: 0 km^{2}

Coastline: 644 kilometres (400 mi)

Maritime claims: measured from claimed archipelagic baselines
territorial sea: 12 nautical miles (22.2 kilometres; 13.8 miles)
contiguous zone: 24 nmi (44.4 km; 27.6 mi)
exclusive economic zone: 923,322 km^{2} (356,497 mi^{2}; 269,198 sq nmi)

Elevation extremes:
lowest point: Indian Ocean 0 m
highest point: unnamed location on Vilingili Island in the Addu Atoll 2.4 metres (7.9 ft). The Maldives have the lowest high-point of any country in the world.

== Resources and land use ==
Natural resources: fish

Land use:
arable land: 10%
permanent crops: 10%
other: 80% (2011)

Irrigated land: 0 km^{2} (2003)

Total renewable water resources: 0.03 km^{3} (2011)

== Environmental concerns ==
Natural hazards: tsunamis; low level of islands makes them very sensitive to sea level rise.
Some scientists fear it could be underwater by 2050 or 2100. The UN's environmental panel has warned that, at current rates, sea level would be high enough to make the country uninhabitable by 2100. President Mohamed Nasheed aims to turn the Maldives into an entirely carbon neutral nation by 2020.

Environment – current issues: depletion of freshwater aquifers threatens water supplies, global warming and sea level rise, coral reef bleaching

Environment – international agreements: Biodiversity, Climate Change, Climate Change-Kyoto Protocol, Desertification, Hazardous Wastes, Law of the Sea, Ozone Layer Protection, Ship Pollution

== Statistics ==
- Position: degree of latitude: 07° 06'30" N to 00° 41'48" S and degree of longitude: 72° 32'30" E to 73° 45'54" E westside of India and Sri Lanka.
- Range: in length approx. 750 km (from north to south) / in width approx. 120 km (from west to east)
- Land territory: 1,196 mostly deserted islands with a total area of approx. 298 km^{2}.
- The islands are in average 1.8 m above sea level.
- Distances: shortest distance to India: approx. 340 km and to Sri Lanka approx. 700 km.

== Nearest nation ==
- India (Laccadives)

== See also ==
- Atolls of the Maldives, for an in-depth description of the atolls
