= LGBTQ rights in the Maldives =

LGBTQ rights in Maldives
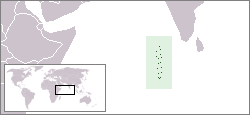
- Maldives
- Legal status: Illegal
- Penalty: Up to 8 years imprisonment with possibility of lashings, house arrest; fines, and deportation for foreign nationals
- Gender identity: No
- Military: No
- Discrimination protections: None

Family rights
- Recognition of relationships: No recognition of same-sex unions
- Adoption: No

Lesbian, gay, bisexual, transgender, and queer (LGBTQ) people in the Maldives face challenges not experienced by non-LGBTQ residents.

Maldivian law criminalizes same-sex sexual activity for men and women. The Penal Code of the Maldives invokes Sharia, and punishes homosexuality, usually through fines, prison sentences, and lashings. Homosexuality is rarely prosecuted, but it remains a social taboo. Those in the LGBTQ community are subject to discrimination, hate crimes, and other human rights violations.

Despite this, LGBTQ tourists are generally considered welcome at most private tourist islands, resorts, and hotels. However, tourist guides advise LGBTQ people to exercise caution in public displays of affection outside of tourist areas.

== Legality ==
=== Penal Code and Islamic law ===
Criminal sexual contact is defined under section 131 of the Maldives Penal Code and refers to the prohibition of sexual contact done without any reason that permits it under Islamic law. Same-sex intercourse is illegal under Islamic law. Same-sex sexual intercourse is explicitly named as an offense within section 411(2) of the Penal Code and is defined under section 411(f).

=== Punishment and enforcement mechanisms ===
According to the International Lesbian, Gay, Bisexual, Trans, and Intersex Association (ILGA), the Maldives Penal Code left matters concerning sexual conduct un-codified and to be regulated by Islamic law, applicable to Muslims only, prior to its amendment. However, since the amended Penal Code came into effect in 2015, the laws concerning LGBTQ rights have tightened.

Maximum penalties for homosexual acts prohibited include imprisonment for up to one year for unlawful marriage under s410(a)(8), imprisonment for up to eight years for criminal conduct under s411(a)(2) and 411(d) with allowance for a supplementary 100 lashes punishment under Sharia, and imprisonment for up to four years for unlawful sexual conduct under s412.

Homosexual acts cannot be punished with death under Maldivian law. Capital punishment, under both civil code and Sharia law, has been suspended since 1953. During preparations to restart executions in 2015, new regulations were passed on the implementation of the penalty: Section 92(k) of the amended Maldivian Penal Code refers that the death penalty was only to be available for egregious, purposeful killing. In section 1205, it is stated that "if an offender is found guilty of committing an offense for which punishments are predetermined in the Holy Quran, that person shall be punished according to Islamic law and as prescribed by this Act and the Holy Quran". The Quran does not specify a punishment for homosexuality. Accordingly, the punishments under Maldivian law are those specified in Sections 410 to 412. (Note: While certain hadith do assign (several different) penalties, the authenticity and applicability of these are disputed by a number of hadith scholars; Quranic scholars and Islamic authorities do not categorize hadith as "Holy Quran".)

The plans to re-implement the death penalty were later abandoned, and the moratorium on capital punishment for any crime was continued.

== Recognition of same-sex relationships ==
Same-sex relationships, including same-sex marriages, civil unions, and domestic partnerships, are not recognized in the Maldives.

Section 410(a)(8) of the Maldives Penal Code (in force since 16 July 2015) criminalizes same-sex marriage by stating that it is an offense if "two persons of the same sex enter into a marriage".

== Discrimination protections ==
There is no legal protection against discrimination based on sexual orientation or gender identity.

== Constitutional framework ==
In 2009, the Maldives enacted a new Constitution that included a chapter on rights and freedoms, demonstrating the desire to embrace a new culture of human rights. However, this did not include any resolutions regarding LGBTQ human rights issues.

== United Nations developments ==
=== United Nations resolutions ===
In 2008, a European-drafted statement called for the decriminalization of homosexuality and recommended that states "take all the necessary measures, in particular legislative or administrative, to ensure that sexual orientation or gender identity may under no circumstances be the basis for criminal penalties, in particular executions, arrests or detention". The Maldives was one of the initial 57 members that signed an opposing document, read by the Syrian representative, which divided the United Nations General Assembly on the issue of LGBTQ Rights.

As a country under Islamic law, the Maldives followed the document's beliefs on several matters. The document stated that the European-drafted statement interfered with matters that should be within the domestic jurisdiction of individual states. Furthermore, the document also stated a desire to avoid the social normalization of what were considered to be 'disgraceful acts' by setting new rights and standards that were not agreed upon by entering into membership and following the Universal Declaration of Human Rights. It also claimed that the declaration was a threat to the international framework of human rights.

In June 2011, the Maldives rejected a resolution submitted by the Republic of South Africa at the United Nations which sought to affirm the rights of the LGBTQ community. A second resolution was adopted by the United Nations Human Rights Council in September 2014 which related to sexual orientation and gender identity, which was rejected by the Maldives as well.

=== Universal Periodic Review ===
In September 2014, in the Human Rights Commission of the Maldives' (HRCM) submission to the Universal Periodic Review of the Maldives, a number of human rights issues were highlighted; however, no LGBTQ rights issues were discussed. "Freedom of expression" was highlighted as an area of concern, as it was noted, "there are no laws which guarantee freedom of expression in the Maldives". References were made to the numerous death threats and other violent behavior received by human rights activists and the Commission did note the need to "take measures to address issues of threats and intimidation directed to parliamentarians, journalists and civil society activists to ensure their safety."

This may or may not extend to the same persecution suffered by LGBTQ rights activists. The objectives of the Maldives Human Rights Commission are set out in the Human Rights Commission Act and explain why LGBTQ rights were not included in the submission. The objectives of the Commission include protecting, promoting and sustaining human rights in the Maldives "in accordance with Islamic Sharia and the Constitution of the Maldives".

In the United Nations' 2016 report of the Human Rights Council on its thirtieth session, it was noted that the Maldives accepted 198 recommendations made out of 258, leaving 60 recommendations rejected. These 60 recommendations included matters that were said to contradict the Islamic faith and the Constitution of the Maldives, such as those "relating to freedom of religion, lesbian, gay, bisexual, transgender and non-traditional forms of the family." Action Canada for Population and Development responded by noting their concern over the Maldives' rejection of "adopting a law against discrimination on the basis of sexual orientation."

In 2015, the Human Rights Council recommended that the Maldives accelerate their work towards enacting anti-discrimination legislation and to "ensure it includes a prohibition of discrimination on the basis of sexual orientation; and combat the stigmatization and marginalization of homosexuals in society." It was reported that those perceived as homosexual or transgender in the Maldives were the target of hate crimes and other human rights violations and so the United Nations Population Fund (UNFPA) recommended the Maldives seek to ensure the protection of LGBTQ individuals from this through law reform. The committee also recommended that the Maldives "decriminalize sexual relations between consenting adults of the same sex." These recommendations were noted by the Maldives but not accepted.

In the Human Rights Council's National Report for the Maldives in 2015, it was noted that since the review of the Maldives in 2010, there have been many important developments in terms of human rights as the country transitioned to a democratic society. The report does not, however, include any detailing of LGBTQ human rights issues or developments.

In May 2015, in a briefing paper submitted to the Maldives' second cycle Universal Periodic Review, the International Service for Human Rights (ISHR) said "un-codified Muslim Sharia Law criminalizes homosexual conduct, thus making the Maldives a very insecure place to advocate for the rights of persons who identify themselves as LGBTQ".

== Living conditions ==
=== Persecution ===
In 2013, Maldivian blogger Hilath Rasheed, who identified as gay and advocated for religious freedom, was stabbed in the neck near his home in Malé. He survived. The assailants were not captured, so a motive for the attack could not be conclusively established, but the incident was linked with his journalistic activity. He had previously been censored, arrested, and threatened because of his work.

Freedom of religion, which heavily interweaves with freedom of expression and sexuality in the Maldives, remains heavily restricted in the country, both legally and through public opinion.

A 2014 article in New Zealand spoke of Abraham Naim, who was granted asylum due to the persecution he faced being gay in the Maldives. The Ministry of Business, Innovation and Employment in New Zealand was said to have granted refugee status because Naim was "at risk of serious harm from state agents" and would likely face further persecution for being openly gay on returning to the Maldives. This was affirmed by Ibrahim Muaz, a spokesman at the President's Office, who commented that those seeking asylum abroad for reasons of sexual orientation discrimination would face prosecution upon return.

While anti-LGBTQ discrimination is pervasive in the Maldives, it remains a popular holiday destination for LGBTQ couples who rarely experience the reality of the country's Islamic-based law. Tourist resorts are usually isolated from civilian population centers and therefore not subject to Islamic law, evidenced by the sale of alcohol in these resorts.

Rainbow Warriors stated that the local Maldives LGBTQ movement is mostly limited to the virtual world, operating on the internet, due to the intensity of homophobia in the country. In 2015, two local men were arrested in their private home on one of the islands in the Maldives with charges of homosexuality, following a complaint by a member of the public.

== Summary table ==
| Same-sex sexual activity legal | No Up to 8 years imprisonment with whippings, house arrest, fines, and deportation. |
| Equal age of consent | No |
| Anti-discrimination laws in employment | No |
| Anti-discrimination laws in the provision of goods and services | No |
| Anti-discrimination laws in all other areas (including indirect discrimination and hate speech) | No |
| Same-sex marriage(s) | No |
| Recognition of same-sex couples | No |
| Adoption by same-sex couples | No |
| Gays allowed to serve in the military | No |
| Right to change legal gender | No Sharia law, as interpreted by the Maldives, prohibits these surgeries and legal gender changes. |
| Conversion therapy banned | No |
| Commercial surrogacy for gay male couples | No (Illegal for all couples regardless of sexual orientation) |
| Access to IVF for lesbians | No |
| MSMs allowed to donate blood | No |

== See also ==
- Human rights in the Maldives
- LGBT rights in Asia
- LGBT in Islam
- Capital punishment for homosexuality
- Criminalization of homosexuality
