= Maldivian passport =

Passports issued by the Republic of Maldives

- The front cover of the current biometric passport.
- Type: Passport
- Issued by: Maldives Immigration
- First issued: 25 January 2016 (latest update)
- Purpose: Identification
- Eligibility: Maldivian citizenship
- Expiration: 5 years from the date of issue

Maldivian passport is a proof of citizenship, issued by Maldives Immigration, to the nationals of the Maldives for international travel. The current passport, the 2nd generation e-passport, was launched on 24 January 2016. This passport consists of a highly secured poly-carbonate data page with laser engraved photos and data. Each visa page of the passport has a different design, represented with numerous illustrations by the Maldivian local artist, Hussain Ali Manik. A Maldivian Passport can be issued to any Maldivian citizen who applies for a passport.

The Maldivian passport has 34 visible and invisible security features in full compliance to the highest biometric security standards. The Maldives is the first country in the South Asian Association for Regional Cooperation SAARC to introduce such a sophisticated bio-metric passport.

According to the Henley Passport Index (2025 update), Maldivian passport is the most powerful passport in South Asia, ranked globally at 53, enabling travel to 93 countries without a prior visa.

== History ==
The first Maldivian travel document was issued in the 1950s by the Ministry of External Affairs (now Ministry of Foreign Affairs), called the Maldivian Pass. This was only able to be used for travel between Maldives and the Dominion of Ceylon (now Sri Lanka), and mainly used for trade purposes.

The first actual passport for a Maldivian was issued from the British High Commission in Colombo, Dominion of Ceylon, in the 1960s and the series was known as the British passport. It enabled Maldivians to travel elsewhere as a "British protected person of the Maldives islands".

The new, first ever Maldivian passport was introduced on 20 April 1964. This was issued by the Maldives Ministry of Foreign Affairs and was the first ever passport issued by an authority of the Maldivian government, which was under the then Prime Minister of Maldives, Ibrahim Nasir. The series introduced on 12 December 1965 was issued by the new Maldives Passport Office, after full independence was attained on 26 July 1965.

The second series of the passport issued after full independence, the "A" series, was introduced in 1975, replaced by a second issue the same series in 1980, by the newly formed Department of Immigration & Emigration. Third and fourth issues of the A series were issued on 1990 and 2003 respectively.

The first electronic passport, or e-passport, was introduced on the 42nd anniversary of independence, 26 July 2007, containing an embedded microprocessor containing biometric information.

The 2nd generation e-passport was launched on 24 January 2016.

== Types of passport ==
=== Electronic passport ===
Electronic passports are issued to Maldivians aged 10 years and above. An electronic passport is issued only to the applicant. Additionally, applicants between 10 and 18 years of age needs to attend Maldives Immigration with one of the applicant's parents.

Application can be made for electronic passports with either 32 pages or 48 pages. A passport with 32-pages costs MVR 1,000 and 48-pages costs MVR 1,500. Validity of all types of passports are 5 years. If the applicant is under the age of 18, a passport can be issued by the request of either a parent, or by a legal guardian.

=== Non-electronic passport ===
Non-electronic passports are issued to children below the age of 10 years, applicants residing abroad; who are therefore unable to attend to collect the passport, applicants who are above 70 years of age and are unable to attend to collect the passport, and for an applicant with permanent illness/disability or temporary medical condition which renders an applicant who is about to travel, unable to walk or have difficulty in walking.

=== Emergency passport ===
Emergency passports are mostly issued in medical cases when the applicant is unable to attend to Immigration, due to the critical condition of an illness. In addition to the application form, doctor's letter will be needed with the explanation of the medical condition of the applicant. These passports are issued even during non-working hours and during public holidays.

== Maldives passport card ==
On 11 October 2017, the Maldives introduced a novel multi-application card that, as well as being a passport, can be used for payments, national ID requirements, as a driving licence, health card, and insurance card. Known as the Passport Card, the document was developed by Maldives Immigration in conjunction with Hamburg-based DERMALOG Identification Systems.

The new card claims to be the world's first bankcard made of polycarbonate material with a dual-interface chip for contactless and contact card reading. Certified by the Bank of Maldives as well as by MasterCard, this allows it to be used internationally for payment like any other MasterCard.

The government anticipates that additional services and information will be added in the future such as eTransport, academic information, and medical information.

The card contains biometric data of the cardholder, such as fingerprints and these features allow the Maldives Passport Card to be used as a regular passport at all borders of the Maldives, including its new eGates. The Passport Card conforms to International Civil Aviation Organization (ICAO) machine readable document standards. The card uses the designation "IP" in its machine readable zone (MRZ), the "I" means identity card and the "P" is undefined in the MRZ standard.

As of 2024, the Maldivian passport card is not valid for international travel, as there are currently no other countries where it is acceptable for entry. It therefore only serves as a document for domestic use.

== Visa requirements ==
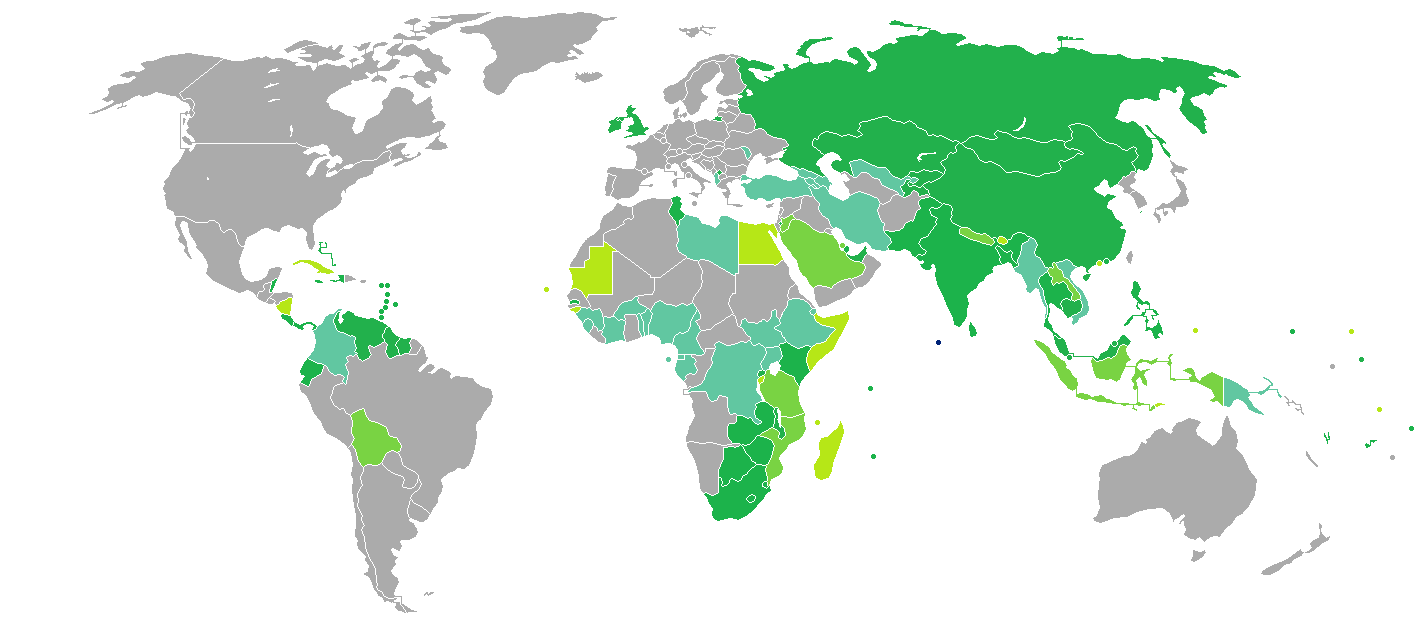
Countries and territories with visa-free entries or visas on arrival for holders of regular Maldivian passports

Maldives
Visa free access
Visa on arrival
eVisa
Visa required

As of 2024, Maldivian citizens had visa-free or visa on arrival access to 96 countries and territories, ranking the Maldivian passport 57th in terms of travel freedom according to the Henley Passport Index.

== See also ==
- Visa requirements for Maldivian citizens
