= National identity cards in the Organization of American States =

Identity cards issued by member states of the Organization of American States

National identity card
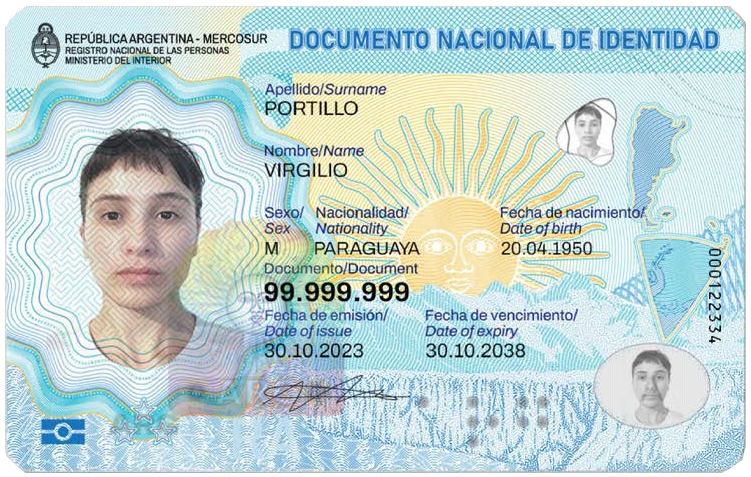
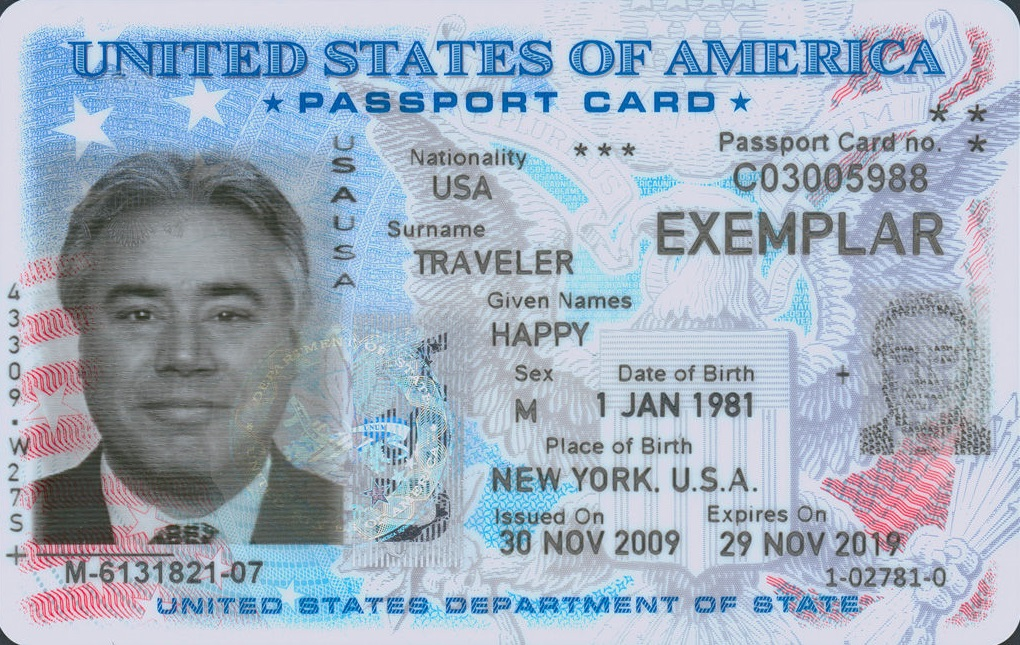
- Examples of identity cards issued in Argentina and United States. ID cards does not necessarily have to have biometric chip.
- Type: Identity card
- Issued by: Organization of American States member states
- Eligibility: Citizens of the Organization of American States
- Size: ID-1

National identity cards are issued to their citizens by the governments of most Organization of American States (OAS) member states. The exceptions are Canada and the United States of America, although the latter issues a passport card which is a valid and required document for traveling in other countries.

== Use ==
=== Travel document ===
As an alternative to presenting a passport, in some countries, due to bilateral agreements, citizens are entitled to use a valid national identity card as a stand-alone travel document to exercise their freedom of movement. Such arrangements include Mercosur, the CA-4 agreement, and the CARICOM passport.

=== Identification document ===
Usage in own country

There are varying rules on domestic use of identity documents. Some countries demand the use of a national identity card or a passport, while others allow for other documents like driver's licences.

In some countries, e.g. Canada, United States, Mexico and Dominica, national identity cards are fully voluntary and not needed by everyone, as identity documents like driving licences are accepted domestically. In these countries only a minority have a national identity card, since most people already have the other acceptable documents.

Even in those OAS countries that impose a national identity card requirement on their citizens, it is generally not required to carry these cards at all times.

Usage outside own country

Some countries allow freedom of movement of their citizens in other countries; in these cases, people may be able to use their national identity document. This arrangement is in place in Mercosur member states and associates, as well as members of CARICOM and CA-4.

=== Design and features ===
The design of the identity cards of OAS member states has changed over time. For example, Colombia's Cédula de Ciudadanía has developed in appearance and security measures against counterfeiting. In 2015, Uruguay added a biometric chip to its Documento de identidad (previously Cédula de identidad), except for minors. In 2023, Argentina started to issue a new Documento Nacional de Identidad (DNI) with a new biometric chip.

Examples of identity cards issued by OAS states

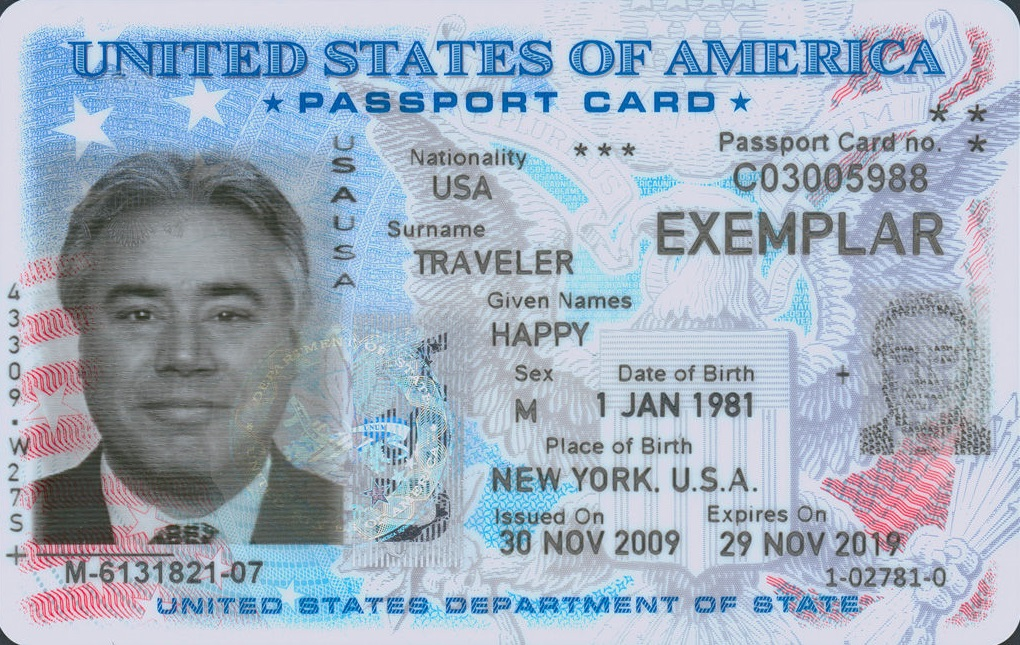
United States

== Overview of national identity cards ==
Member states issue a variety of national identity cards which differ in their technical specifications and issuing procedures. In most cases, cards can be issued abroad through a country's consulate.

Member state	eID app	Front	Reverse	Compulsory/optional	Cost	Validity	Issuing authority	Latest version
Antigua and Barbuda	No			The Antiguan and Barbudan national identity card is compulsory for voting as well as for different government transactions.	No data	No data	No data	No data
Argentina	NFC			National identity card compulsory for all Argentine citizens, as well foreign residents.	Free (For new-borns); ARS$3.000 for the rest; ARS$6.000 (Foreigners)	15 years (After the 14 years update)	Renaper and Registro Civil	2023
(The Bahamas); Bahamas	No	No national identity card. Plans for introducing new identity cards were established in 2013, however no progress has been made so far. In 2022, the government announced ID cards would be rolled out in 2023.		Identity documentation is optional.				
Barbados	No			Optional, although compulsory for voting and other government transactions. New biometric national ID cards were released since June 2022.	$60	No data	No data	2023
Belize	No			Optional, although compulsory for voting and other government transactions. Available also for any Commonwealth country citizen who has lived in Belize for a year without leaving and been at least 2 months in an area where the person has been registered in. National ID cards received a new design in 2019.	No data	No data	No data	2019
Bolivia	No			Compulsory at 18, but rarely demanded by police.	Bs 17 (Physical); Bs 20 (Digital)	5 years (Up to 58 years of age in physical format); 2 years (Up to 58 years of age in digital format); Indefinite (Over 58 years of age and people with severe and very severe disabilities in both formats)	No data	2023
Brazil	No			Mandatory for all Brazilian citizens at the age of 18.	First copy: free; Second copy: accordingly to federative unit issuer	No data	No data	2023
Canada	No	No national identity card. Canadian identity cards are issued by provinces.		Identity documentation is optional.				
Chile	NFC			Normally this is first issued at age 2 or 3, but it can be issued whenever the legal ascendant(s) request its issue. It is compulsory at 18, when it has to be carried at all times.	CLP$$3820	10 Years	Servicio de Registro Civil e Identificación de Chile	2013
Colombia	No			Cédula de Ciudadanía is compulsory at the age of 18, and from 31 July 2010, the only valid format is the yellow one. It has to be carried at all times and must be presented to police or the military upon their request.	COP$$63.050	10 Years	Registraduría Nacional del Estado Civil	2020
Costa Rica	No			Every citizen immediately must carry an ID card after turning 18.	Free	10 Years	Registro Civil del Tribunal Supremo de Elecciones	2023
Dominica	No			The Dominica national multipurpose identification card is optional for all Dominiquais nationals and is valid for international travel within OECS countries.	No data	No data	No data	
Dominican Republic	No			If needed, an underage ID card may be obtained at the age of 16, yet the official ID (which will allow the individual to vote) is obtained at 18.	Citizens: Free of charge; Foreigners: DOP$3,000~6,000	Adults: 18 Years old; Minors: 16 Years old	Junta Central Electoral	2014
Ecuador	NFC			Every citizen over 18 years must have a national identity card.	$10.00.	No data	No data	2021
El Salvador	No			Every citizen 18 years or older must carry this ID card.	No data	No data	No data	No data
Grenada	No			The Grenada Voter ID card is optional, although compulsory for certain governmental transactions.	No data	No data	No data	No data
Guatemala	No			The Guatemalan constitution requires personal identification via documentation, person rooting or the government. If the person cannot be identified, they may be sent to a judge until identification is provided.	GTQ 100	10 years	Registro Nacional de las Personas	2009
Guyana	No			The Guyanese national identity card is an electronic ID card, compulsory for all Guyanese nationals.	No data	No data	No data	No data
Haiti	No			The Haitian national identity card is an electronic ID card, compulsory for all Haitian nationals at the age of 18.	No data	No data	No data	No data
Honduras	No			The Honduran national identity card is an electronic ID card, compulsory for all Honduran nationals at the age of 18.	No data	No data	No data	No data
Jamaica	No			Optional, although compulsory for voting and other government transactions. Since 2022 a brand new biometric National ID Card has been unveiled, free of charge for Jamaican citizens.	Free	No data	No data	2022
Mexico	No	The National Electorate Institute (Instituto Nacional Electoral, INE) issues Voter Credential cards (credencial para votar) to Mexican citizens over 18 years of age. This card is required to participate in Federal level elections and while it is the de facto ID for most legal transactions, it is not mandatory to have one. However people must be identified by law.		Identity documentation is optional, however citizens must be identified if stopped.				
Panama	No			Cedula de Identidad (National identity card) Cedula de Identidad. Required at 12 (cedula juvenil) and 18 years of age. Panamanian citizens must carry their Cedula at all times. New biometric national identity cards rolling out in 2019.	No data	No data	Tribunal electoral	2019
Peru	NFC EMV			National Document of Identification or Documento Nacional de Identidad (DNI). Citizens can have a minor DNI but at the age of 17 they are encouraged to renew their DNI to get an Adult DNI. At 18, it is compulsory.	10 soles (renewal); 30 soles (DNI); 41 soles (DNIe)	No data	National Registry of Identification and Civil Status (Registro Nacional de Identidad y Estado Civil)	2020
Saint Kitts and Nevis	No			The National Identity Cards are optional. Issued since 2010.	No data	No data	No data	
Saint Lucia	No			Passport or Identity Card is compulsory for all Saint Lucian citizens.	No data	No data	No data	No data
Saint Vincent and the Grenadines	No			The identity card is compulsory.	No data	No data	No data	No data
Suriname	No			Compulsory for all Surinamese citizens.	No data	No data	No data	No data
Trinidad and Tobago	No			The national identity card in Trinidad and Tobago is mandatory when voting. However, other forms can be presented of verifying the identity.	No data	No data	Elections and Boundaries Commission	No data
United States	No	The U.S. passport card is issued by the federal government via the Department of State upon voluntary request. The primary purpose of the passport card is used as a Federal issued Identity card and a limited travel document under the Western Hemisphere Travel Initiative for travel by land and sea, similar to the usage of national identity cards in the Schengen Area. However, passport cards are also conclusive proof of U.S. citizenship under federal law, accepted for domestic airline travel under the REAL ID Act, a List A document for Form I-9 purposes, and generally proof of identity/citizenship both inside and outside the United States. Despite this, the predominant and de facto method of identification remains the driver's license (or non-driver ID card) issued by each state, because driver's license is needed for driving, although these generally do not indicate citizenship or nationality. In many US states a valid ID is required for voting purposes only. It can be various different types of ID including a US Passport Card or Passport Book.		Identity documentation is optional.				
Uruguay	NFC EMV			The Identity document (previously known as "Cédula de idenitdad"), are issued to all Uruguayan citizens and legal residents, Required for children older than 45-day. It is required for many things such as credit card transactions, age verification, etc.	No data	5 years (underage); 10 years (grown-up) never expires (over 68 years)	Dirección Nacional de Identificación Civil de Uruguay	2015
Venezuela	No			Compulsory for anyone 10 and older, and it must be renewed every 10 years.	Venezuelan citizens: free; Foreign citizens: 4 Tax Units	10 years, counted from the date of issue	Servicio Administrativo de Identificación, Migración y Extranjería	No data

== See also ==
- Organization of American States
- Identity document
- Internal passport
- Cédula de identidad
