= Visa policy of the Maldives =

Policy on permits required to enter the Maldives

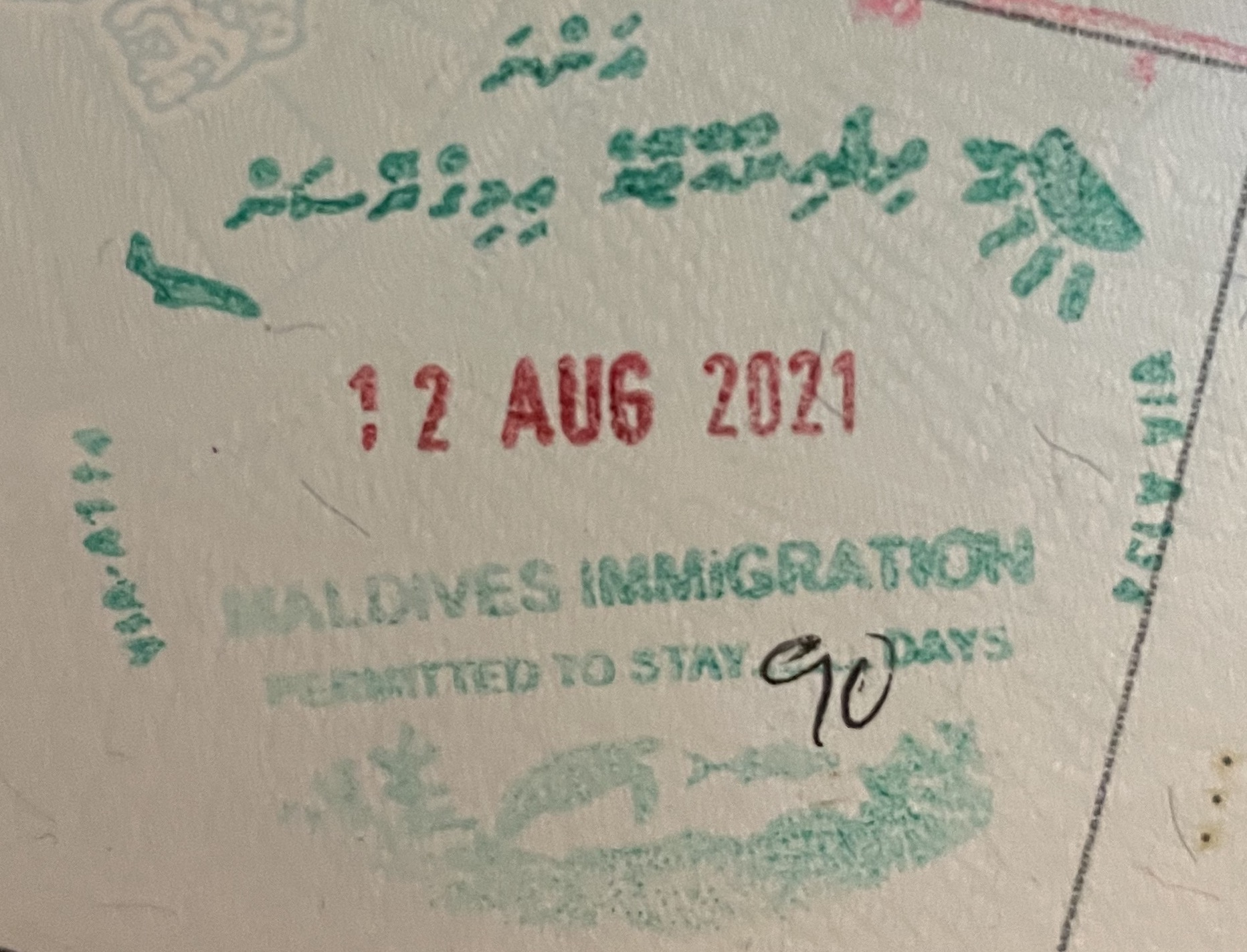
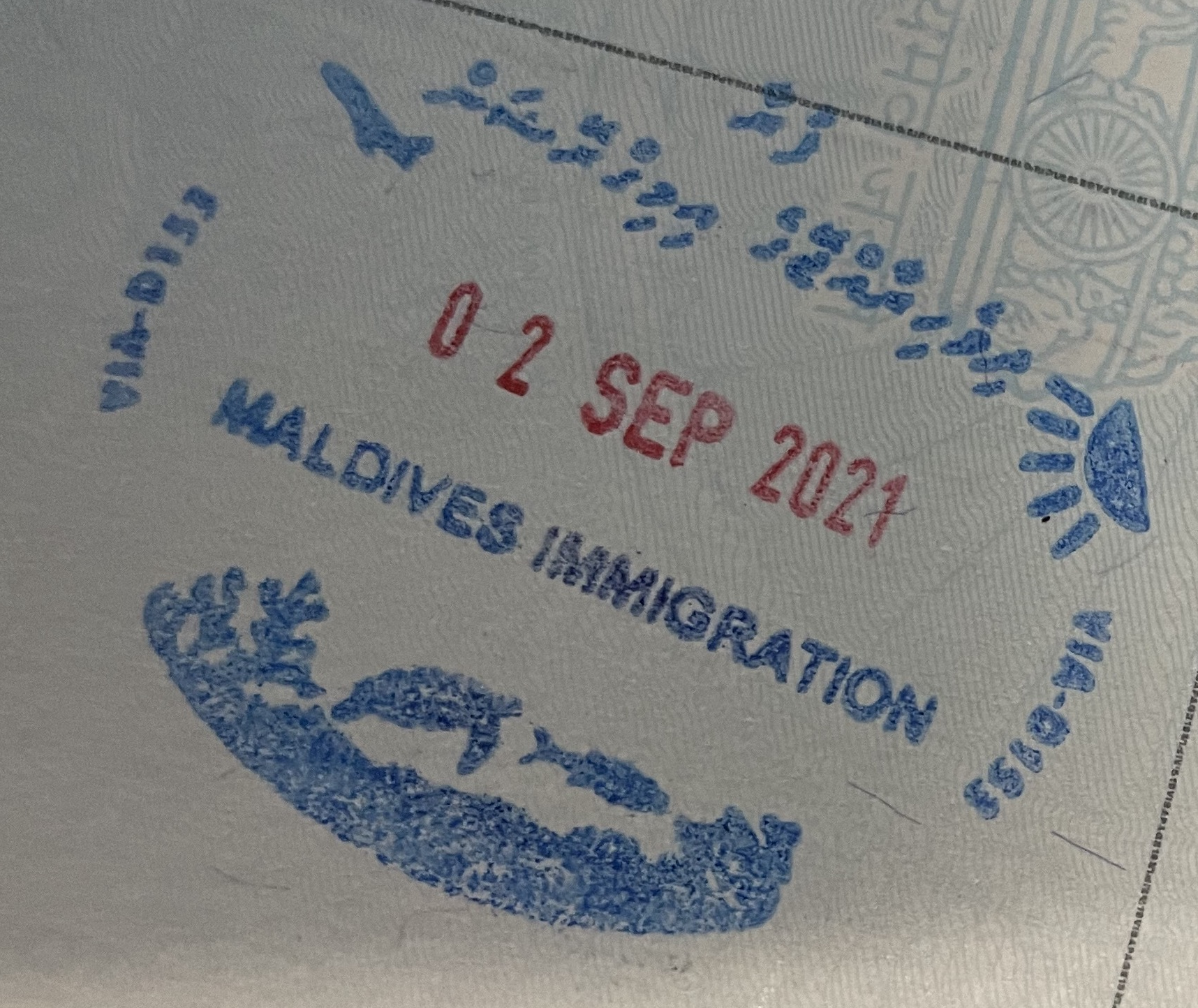
Entry and exit stamps of Maldives issued at Velana International Airport.

Most visitors to the Maldives must obtain a free 30-day visa on arrival unless they are citizens from one of the visa-exempt countries.

However, entry is refused to citizens of Israel.

== Entry requirements ==
All visitors to Maldives must:

- Hold a passport or a travel document with a Machine Readable Zone (MRZ) with at least 1 months validity. (Passengers with an extended validity in their passports are not allowed to enter.)
- Have a complete travel itinerary including confirmed return journey tickets, a prepaid confirmed booking at a registered facility, and sufficient funds to cover the stay in the Maldives, or a pre-approved sponsorship visa from Maldives Immigration.
- Have entry requirements to their onward destination; for example, the visa and passport validity.
- Have Traveller Declaration form filled in and submitted by all foreigners arriving to the Maldives, within 96 hours (4 days) to the flight time. Submission of the form is free of charge and must be filled electronically via the IMUGA portal.
- Have Carte Jaune proof of a yellow fever vaccination, if applicable. Children under 1 year of age are exempt from the yellow fever vaccination.

== Visa policy map ==
Visa policy of the Maldives The Maldives Visa not required (90 days) Visa not required (30 days) Free visa on arrival Admission refused

== Visa exemption ==
=== Ordinary passports ===
Citizens of the following countries may enter the Maldives without a visa for the following period:

90 days

- Azerbaijan
- India
- Malaysia
- Russia
- Sri Lanka

3 months

- Pakistan

30 days

- Cambodia
- China
- Guyana
- Kazakhstan
- Kyrgyzstan
- Mongolia
- Morocco
- Seychelles

Date of visa changes

Citizens of Pakistan have never required a visa to enter the Maldives.

- March 1979: India
- 25 July 2019: Russia
- 02 September 2019: Sri Lanka
- 31 January 2020: Morocco
- 14 September 2022: Kazakhstan
- 17 February 2023: China
- 4 May 2023: Cambodia
- 20 August 2023: Kyrgyzstan
- 26 September 2023: Guyana
- 12 January 2024: Mongolia
- 29 April 2026: Azerbaijan
- 15 May 2026: Seychelles

=== Non-ordinary passports ===
In addition to countries whose citizens are visa-exempt, holders of diplomatic, official and service passports of Japan may enter the Maldives without a visa.

=== Future changes ===
The Maldives has signed visa exemption agreements with the following countries, but they have not yet entered into force:

Country	Passports	Agreement signed on
Belarus	All	24 September 2026
Dominica	All	9 July 2025
Oman	Diplomatic, official, service, special	11 December 2024
Tajikistan	All	27 November 2024
Andorra	All	20 September 2023
Honduras	All	19 September 2023
Togo	All	19 September 2023
São Tomé and Príncipe	All	1 September 2023
The Gambia	All	11 June 2023
Serbia	Diplomatic, official	9 May 2023
Rwanda	All	5 May 2023
Burundi	All	26 April 2023
Ghana	All	14 March 2023

== Admission restrictions ==
=== Israel ===
- As of 15 April 2025, entry and transit is refused to citizens of Israel, even if not leaving the aircraft and proceeding by the same flight. This is a temporary measure in response to the Gaza war and domestic public anger until further notice.

== Visitor statistics ==
Most visitors arriving in the Maldives were from the following countries of nationality:

Country	2019	2018	2017	2016	2015
China	284,029	283,116	306,905	324,326	359,514
India	166,030	90,474	83,019	66,955	52,368
Italy	136,343	105,297	88,867	71,202	65,616
Germany	131,561	117,532	112,109	106,381	105,132
United Kingdom	126,199	114,602	103,977	101,843	92,775
Russia	83,369	70,935	61,931	46,522	44,323
France	59,738	50,476	42,365	40,487	42,024
United States	54,474	42,901	39,180	32,589	29,308
Japan	44,251	42,304	41,133	39,894	39,244
Australia	39,928	37,254	27,360	-	-
Total	1,702,887	1,484,274	1,389,542	1,286,135	1,234,248

== See also ==
- Visa requirements for Maldivian citizens
