= Ismail Khilath Rasheed =

Maldivian blogger

- Other names: Hilath
- Citizenship: Maldivian
- Occupation: Journalist
- Known for: Activism for religious freedom, 2011 imprisonment, 2012 stabbing
- Website: hilath.blogspot.com

Ismail Khilath Rasheed (also known as Hilath) is a Maldivian blogger known for his support of religious tolerance and his involvement in several national controversies. Reporters Without Borders has described him as a "leading journalist" and "one of his country’s leading free speech advocates".

== Background ==
Rasheed worked for a time as the youngest acting editor of the Maldivian newspaper Haveeru. Haveeru Daily was the longest serving and highest circulated news paper since its inception and removed from operation by a Court order in 2016. Hilath came to national attention in early 2010, when he was charged by the government with atheism, drug use, and homosexuality, allegedly in retaliation for his human rights reporting. He also received several death threats, and material appeared on Maldivian websites calling for his beheading, leading the Maldives Journalists Association to offer a statement in his support.

== Blog closing ==
In November 2011, his website, www.hilath.com, was shut down by Communications Authority of the Maldives (CAM) on the order of the Ministry of Islamic Affairs, on the grounds that the site contained "anti-Islamic material". Islam is the only legal religion for Maldivian nationals under the 2008 Maldives Constitution, with Sunni Islam predominant. Rasheed defended his blog as an expression of his Sufism and condemned the censorship as Sunni intolerance. In a visit to Malé the same month, UN High Commissioner for Human Rights Navanethem Pillay described the blog's closing as a "disturbing act" raising concerns about a "rise in religious inolerance". Reporters Without Borders (RSF) also condemned the closure, stating that "the increase in acts of religious intolerance is a threat to the Maldives' young democracy".

== December 2011 arrest and response ==
On 10 December, Rasheed organized a 30-person rally in Malé calling for religious tolerance. The rally was attacked by ten men throwing stones, one of which fractured Rasheed's skull, causing him to be hospitalized. Following the protest, members of the Maldives' opposition Adhaalath Party called for Rasheed's arrest and called for a 23 December counterdemonstration to protect Islam. A website for these protests again called for the murder of "those against Islam". Amnesty International reported that the Government of the Maldives made no effort to locate Rasheed's attackers, despite "credible photographic evidence of the attack".

On 14 December, Rasheed was detained on a charge of questioning the constitution, later amended to "involvement in an unlawful assembly". Amnesty International described the charge as a "clear example of the erosion of freedom of expression in the Maldives," as well as named Rasheed a prisoner of conscience, and demanded his immediate release. RSF also condemned the arrest, stating that "it is disturbing to see the government yet again yielding to pressure from the most conservative fringes of Maldivian society". Rasheed later stated that he faced mistreatment while in custody and that Maldivian prison conditions remained "unchanged" since the reign of autocratic president Maumoon Abdul Gayoom. The Maldivian Ministry of Foreign Affairs released a statement pledging an independent inquiry into Rasheed's allegations.

Rasheed's detention was extended twice on request of investigating officers, in order that the Islamic Ministry might provide him counseling to "bring him back to Islam". He was released on 10 January after 24 days' detention.

== Stabbing ==
On 5 June 2012, Rasheed was stabbed in the neck near his house in Malé. A hospital source stated that the blade had missed cutting left jugular artery, but that Rasheed stabilized following a vascular surgery done in the ADK Hospital. RSF stated that it appeared that he had been deliberately targeted for his journalism. A minister of the Maldivian government condemned the attack, but also added "Hilath must have known that he had become a target of a few extremists ... We are not a secular country. When you talk about religion there will always be a few people who do not agree." He later left Maldives due to fearing for his safety.

== Quit blogging on a regular basis ==
On 26 March 2015, Rasheed informed on his blog on his decision to stop blogging on a regular basis. He also mentioned that "I have realised a very important truth. Allah (God) is real. If you also keep an open mind, one day you will also see this truth".
