= Law enforcement in the Maldives =

There are a handful of law enforcement establishments in the Maldives.

== Police ==
Maldives Police Service

The organization is headed by Ministry of Homeland Security and Technology, commissioner of Police Ali Shujau and Deputy commissioner. Service branches include;

- Commissioner's Bureau
- Professional Standards Command
- Specialist Crime Command
- Central Operations Command
- Divisional Operations Command
- Directorate of Intelligence
- Forensic Service Directorate
- Service Development Directorate
- Service Support Directorate
- Information & Communication Directorate
- Institute for Security & Law Enforcement Studies

== Armed Forces ==
Maldives National Defence Force (MNDF)

The organization is headed by Ministry of Defense and Chief of Defence Force Major General Ibrahim Hilmy. Service branches include;

- Coast Guard
- Marine Corps
- Special Forces
- Service Corps
- Defence Intelligence Service
- Military Police
- Corps of Engineers
- Special Protection Group
- Medical Corps
- Adjutant General's Corps
- Air Corps
- Fire and Rescue Service

== Customs ==
Maldives Customs Service

Maldives Customs Service is a law enforcement organization established under the Maldives Customs Act (No: 8/2011). Though the Act came into force in 2011, history of Customs can be traced back to 1890, marking it as the oldest organization in the Maldives.

The Organization is headed by Ministry of Homeland Security and Technology and Commissioner General of Customs Fathimath Dhiyana.

Today Customs operation is carried out across the country, including international airports and seaports. There are 3 designated international seaports and 3 international airports, major ones established in the Central Region.

Customs vision is mainly focused on border enforcement and facilitating legitimate trade and travels while reflecting international standards and best practices.

== Immigration ==
Maldives Immigration

The organization is headed by Ministry of Homeland Security and Technology and Controller General of Immigration Commissioner of Police (Retd.) Ahmed Faseeh. Service branches include;

- Permit Section
- Travel Document Section
- Airport Control Section
- Harbour Control Section
- Expatriate Monitoring and Repatriation Division

== Prison ==
Maldives Correctional Service

The organization is headed by Ministry of Homeland Security and Technology and Commissioner of Prisons Hassan Zareer. Service branches include;

- Maafusi Prison
- Asseyri Prison
- Male' Prison
- HulhuMale Detention Centre
- Emergency Support Group
- Prison Academy
- Parole Office
- Rehabilitation Command
- Operations Command
- Cooperate Command
