= Villingili (Addu Atoll) =

- Holiday Island Resort
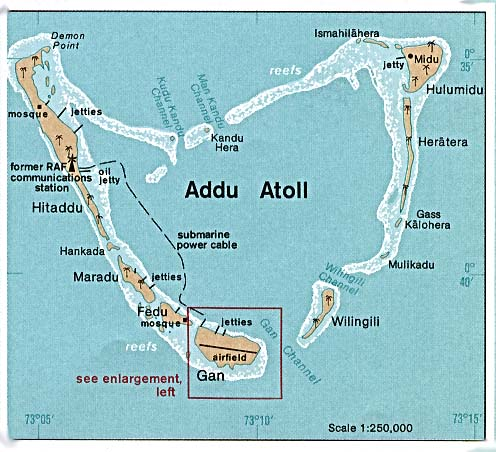
- Map of Addu Atoll, Maldives

- Location in Maldives
- Coordinates: 0°40′43″S 73°11′41″E
- Country: Maldives
- Administrative atoll: Addu Atoll

Dimensions
  - Length: 3 km (1.9 mi)
  - Width: 0.8 km (0.50 mi)
- Elevation: 5.2 m (17 ft)

Population
  - Total: 0
- Time zone: UTC+05:00 (MST)

Villingili is a resort island in Addu Atoll, Maldives.

In 1997, the government of the Maldives contracted the American firm Abonmarche to build a large resort and marina on the island to attract tourism. In 2000 the government withdrew this contract, and finding no other bidders, awarded it to another firm called "Energy Tours" to build a smaller resort. Energy Tours defaulted on this contract.

In 2005, Maldives President Maumoon Abdul Gayoom contracted Shangri-La Hotels and Resorts, a Hong Kong–based company, to build the first luxury resort in Addu Atoll. The resort was developed by Addu Investment Private Limited (70%) and the Maldivian Government (30%). The resort cost an estimated 150 million US dollars and opened in early 2009. Shangri-La's Villingili Resort & Spa features a range of 132 villas including two Presidential Villas. The Villingili Shangri-La Resort closed indefinitely in 2020. The Maldivian government has been aiming to reopen the resort.

The island has the highest natural elevation in the Maldives, Mount Villingili. It stands at 5.1m (16.75 ft) above sea level, and is located on Villingili's golf course.
