= List of ambassadors and high commissioners to Malaysia =

The following is a list of ambassadors and high commissioners to Malaysia. High commissioners represent member states of the Commonwealth of Nations and ambassadors represent other states. Some diplomats are accredited by, or to, more than one country. They are styled "Tuan Yang Terutama", loosely translated as "His Excellency".

Sending country	Date of arrival	Location of resident embassy	Ambassador	List	Embassy website
Afghanistan	3 October 2019	Kuala Lumpur, Malaysia	Dr Moheb Rahman Spinghar		
Algeria	26 February 2015	Kuala Lumpur, Malaysia	Abdelhafid Bounour		
Angola	6 August 2011	Beijing, China	Vacant; Orlando Jorge E. da Cruz Lima (Chargé d'affaires)		
Argentina	18 July 2016	Kuala Lumpur, Malaysia	Manuel Jose Balaguer Salas		
Armenia	21 March 2019	Jakarta, Indonesia	Dziunik Aghajanian		
Australia	10 November 2021	Kuala Lumpur, Malaysia	Dr Justin Lance Lee (High Commissioner)	List	
Austria	10 November 2021	Kuala Lumpur, Malaysia	Andreas Launer		
Azerbaijan	10 November 2021	Selangor, Malaysia	Irfan Davudov		
Bahamas	19 March 2012	Beijing, China	Sheila Carey (High Commissioner)		
Bahrain		Bangkok, Thailand	Vacant; Ghassan Ahmed Almuharaqi (Chargé d'affaires)		
Bangladesh	8 December 2020	Kuala Lumpur, Malaysia	Golam Sarwar (High Commissioner)		
Belarus	12 February 2018	Jakarta, Indonesia	Valery Kolesnik		
Belgium	7 November 2018	Kuala Lumpur, Malaysia	Pascal Gregoire		
Benin	2 August 2012	Tokyo, Japan	Zomahoun D.C. Rufin		
Bosnia and Herzegovina	21 March 2024	Kuala Lumpur, Malaysia	Edin Jahić		
Botswana	21 March 2019	Beijing, China	Mothusi Bruce Rabasha Palai		
Brazil	7 July 2020	Kuala Lumpur, Malaysia	Ary Norton De Murat Quintella		
Brunei	10 November 2021	Putrajaya, Malaysia	Mahmud Saidin (High Commissioner)		
Bulgaria	25 April 2008	Jakarta, Indonesia	Vacant; Veneta Zayakova (Chargé d'affaires)		
Burkina Faso	19 December 2011	New Delhi, India	Vacant; Oumarou Maiga (Chargé d'affaires)		
Cambodia	16 January 2020	Kuala Lumpur, Malaysia	Cheuy Vichet		
Canada	25 April 2022	Kuala Lumpur, Malaysia	Wayne Robson (High Commissioner)		
Chile	8 December 2020	Kuala Lumpur, Malaysia	Diego Velasco Von Pilgrimm		
China	20 December 2020	Kuala Lumpur, Malaysia	Ouyang Yujing	List	
Colombia	6 November 2017	Kuala Lumpur, Malaysia	Mauricio Gonzalez Lopez		
Democratic Republic of Congo		New Delhi, India	Vacant; Josephine Zozo Binti (Chargé d'affaires)		
Republic of Congo	8 December 2012	New Delhi, India	Felix Ngoma		
Cote d'Ivoire	16 August 2011	Tokyo, Japan	Jerome Kloh Weya		
Croatia	16 January 2020	Kuala Lumpur, Malaysia	Ivan Velimir Starčević		
Cuba	2021	Kuala Lumpur, Malaysia	Florentino Batista Gonzalez		
Cyprus	21 March 2019	New Delhi, India	Agis Loizou (High Commissioner)		
Czech Republic	21 March 2019	Kuala Lumpur, Malaysia	Milan Hupcej		
Denmark	8 December 2020	Kuala Lumpur, Malaysia	Kristen Rosenvold Geelan		
Djibouti	10 September 2009	Tokyo, Japan	Ahmed Araita Ali		
Dominican Republic	16 September 2008	New Delhi, India	Frank Hans Dannenberg Castellanos		
Ecuador	1 September 2019	Kuala Lumpur, Malaysia	Vacant; Iván Michel Maldonado Vaca (Chargé d'affaires a.i.)		
Egypt	10 November 2021	Kuala Lumpur, Malaysia	Ragai Tawfik Said Nasr		
El Salvador	21 March 2019	Seoul, South Korea	Milton Alcides Magana Herrera		
Equatorial Guinea		Beijing, China	Vacant; Simon Poon (Chargé d'affaires)		
Ethiopia		Beijing, China	Hailekiros Gessesse Tedla		
European Union	8 December 2020	Kuala Lumpur, Malaysia	Michalis Rokas		
Fiji		Selangor, Malaysia	Vacant; Pita Tagicakirewa (Chargé d'affaires)		
Finland	8 December 2020	Kuala Lumpur, Malaysia	Sami Rafael Leino		
France	8 December 2020	Kuala Lumpur, Malaysia	Ronald Galharugue	List	
Gabon		Tokyo, Japan			
Gambia	16 September 2017	Kuala Lumpur, Malaysia	Ramzia Diab Ghanim (High Commissioner)		
Georgia	11 September 2017	Kuala Lumpur, Malaysia	Nikoloz Apkhazava		
Germany	8 December 2020	Kuala Lumpur, Malaysia	Dr Peter-Christof Blomeyer		
Ghana	12 February 2018	Kuala Lumpur, Malaysia	Akua Sekyiwa Ahenkora (High Commissioner)		
Greece	7 November 2015	Jakarta, Indonesia	Georgios Dogoritis		
Guinea	18 July 2019	Kuala Lumpur, Malaysia	Mohamed Lamine Conde		
Holy See	21 January 2021	Kuala Lumpur, Malaysia	Archbishop Wojciech Zaluski	List	
Hungary	8 December 2020	Kuala Lumpur, Malaysia	Petra Ponevács-Pana		
Iceland	29 December 2015	New Delhi, India	Thorir Ibsen		
India	10 November 2021	Kuala Lumpur, Malaysia	BN Reddy (High Commissioner)		
Indonesia	14 September 2020	Kuala Lumpur, Malaysia	Hermono		
Iran	21 March 2024	Kuala Lumpur, Malaysia	Valiollah Mohammadi Nasrabadi		
Iraq	17 December 2018	Kuala Lumpur, Malaysia	Hamed Ibraheem Abd-Alkareem Al-Jeboori (Chargé d'affaires)		
Ireland	13 October 2019	Kuala Lumpur, Malaysia	Hilary Reilly	List	
Italy	10 November 2021	Kuala Lumpur, Malaysia	Massimo Rustico		
Jamaica	29 December 2015	Tokyo, Japan	Clement Philip Ricardo Allicock (High Commissioner)		
Japan	16 January 2020	Kuala Lumpur, Malaysia	Hiroshi Oka		
Jordan	17 August 2017	Kuala Lumpur, Malaysia	Thamer Abdalla Mohammad Adwan		
Kazakhstan	10 November 2021	Kuala Lumpur, Malaysia	Bulat Sugurbayev		
Kenya	21 March 2019	Kuala Lumpur, Malaysia	Francis Ndegwa Muhoro (High Commissioner)		
Kuwait	3 October 2019	Kuala Lumpur, Malaysia	Dr Hamad Mohammad Hassan Burhamah		
North Korea		Kuala Lumpur, Malaysia	Vacant; Yu Song Kim (Chargé d'affaires)		
South Korea	16 January 2020	Kuala Lumpur, Malaysia	Lee Chi Beom		
Kyrgyzstan	14 February 2020	Kuala Lumpur, Malaysia	Azimbek Beknazarov		
Laos	2021	Kuala Lumpur, Malaysia	Viengsavanh Sipraseuth		
Latvia	21 March 2019	Riga, Latvia	Normanss Penke		
Lebanon	12 February 2018	Kuala Lumpur, Malaysia	George Bitar Ghanem		
Lesotho	28 August 2018	Kuala Lumpur, Malaysia	Maj. General (Rtd) Lineo Bernard Poopa (High Commissioner)		
Liberia	7 April 2011	Tokyo, Japan	Youngor Telewoda		
Libya	1 May 2018	Kuala Lumpur, Malaysia	Vacant; Nagat M.S. Elforgani (Chargé d'affaires a.i.)		
Lithuania	5 February 2009	Vilnius, Lithuania	Sigutė Jakštonytė		
Luxembourg	14 September 2015	Bangkok, Thailand	Robert Lauer		
Macedonia	10 June 2014	New Delhi, India	Toni Atanasovski		
Malawi		Tokyo, Japan	Reuben Ngwenya (Ambassador Designate)		
Maldives	26 March 2019	Kuala Lumpur, Malaysia	Visam Ali	List	
Mali	2 September 2015	New Delhi, India	Niankoro Yeah Samake		
Malta	21 March 2019	Balzan, Malta	Clifford Borg-Marks (High Commissioner)		
Mauritania	19 March 2012	Tokyo, Japan	Yahya Ngam		
Mauritius	8 December 2020	Kuala Lumpur, Malaysia	Jagdishwar Goburdhun (High Commissioner)		
Mexico	10 November 2021	Kuala Lumpur, Malaysia	Edmundo Font Lopez		
Micronesia		Tokyo, Japan			
Mongolia	16 November 2006	Bangkok, Thailand	Luvsandoo Dashpurev		
Morocco	1 September 2019	Kuala Lumpur, Malaysia	Vacant; Omar Bouchiar (Chargé d'affaires)		
Mozambique	19 March 2010	Jakarta, Indonesia	Carlos Agostinho do Rosário (High Commissioner)		
Myanmar	17 August 2017	Kuala Lumpur, Malaysia	U Sein Oo	List	
Namibia	11 December 2020	Kuala Lumpur, Malaysia	Herman Pule Diamonds (High Commissioner)		
Nepal	1 March 2019	Kuala Lumpur, Malaysia	Udaya Raj Pandey		
Netherlands	13 August 2019	Kuala Lumpur, Malaysia	Aart Jacobi		
New Zealand	8 December 2020	Kuala Lumpur, Malaysia	Pam Chong Dunn (High Commissioner)	List	
Nicaragua	2 November 2007	Tokyo, Japan	Saul Arana Castellon		
Niger	24 April 2012	New Delhi, India	Ali Illiassou		
Nigeria	10 November 2021	Kuala Lumpur, Malaysia	Dr Hajara Salim Ibrahim (High Commissioner)		
Norway	10 November 2021	Kuala Lumpur, Malaysia	Norte Paulsen		
Oman	6 November 2017	Kuala Lumpur, Malaysia	Sheikh Al-Abbas Ibrahim Hamed Al Harthi		
Pakistan	23 August 2019	Kuala Lumpur, Malaysia	Amna Baloch (High Commissioner)		
Palestine	7 November 2018	Kuala Lumpur, Malaysia	Walid A. M. Abuali		
Panama		Bangkok, Thailand	Isauro Mora		
Papua New Guinea	6 April 2016	Kuala Lumpur, Malaysia	Peter Vincent (High Commissioner)		
Paraguay		New Delhi, India	Brigido Lescano Britos (Minister / Chargé d'affaires a.i.)		
Peru	29 December 2015	Kuala Lumpur, Malaysia	Guido Felipe Loayza Devescovi		
Philippines	15 April 2017	Kuala Lumpur, Malaysia	Charles C. Jose		
Poland	7 November 2018	Kuala Lumpur, Malaysia	Krzysztof Debnicki		
Portugal	6 November 2017	Bangkok, Thailand	Francisco Assis Morais e Cunha Vaz Patto		
Qatar	25 September 2018	Kuala Lumpur, Malaysia	Fahad Mohammed Yousef Kafoud		
Romania	10 November 2021	Kuala Lumpur, Malaysia	Nineta Barbulescu		
Russia	16 January 2020	Kuala Lumpur, Malaysia	Nail Latypov		
Rwanda	12 February 2018	Tokyo, Japan	Venetia Sebudandi		
Samoa	19 March 2012	Canberra, Australia	Lemalu Tate Simi		
San Marino	16 June 2005	Domagnano, San Marino	Mauro Montanari		
Saudi Arabia	10 April 2017	Kuala Lumpur, Malaysia	Mahmoud Hussien Saeed Qattan		
Senegal	2021	Kuala Lumpur, Malaysia	Abdoulaye Barro		
Seychelles	10 September 2009	Beijing, China	Philippe Lee Gall		
Sierra Leone	10 September 2018	Beijing, China	Ernest Mbaimba Ndomahina (High Commissioner)		
Singapore	25 November 2014	Kuala Lumpur, Malaysia	Vanu Gopala Menon (High Commissioner)		
Slovakia	18 July 2019	Jakarta, Indonesia	Jaroslav Chelbo		
Solomon Islands	2 July 2013	Kuala Lumpur, Malaysia	Victor Samuel Ngele (High Commissioner)		
Somalia	2 December 2016	Kuala Lumpur, Malaysia	Abucar Abdi Osman		
South Africa	12 January 2021	Kuala Lumpur, Malaysia	David Evan Malcomson (High Commissioner); Schoeman Du Plessis (Chargé d'affaires a.i.)		
Spain	24 November 2018	Kuala Lumpur, Malaysia	Jose Miguel Corvinos Lafuente		
Sri Lanka	3 October 2019	Kuala Lumpur, Malaysia	Air Chief Marshal Kapila Veedhiya Bandara Jayampathy (High Commissioner)		
Sudan	17 August 2017	Selangor, Malaysia	Hamza Omer Hassan Ahmed		
Swaziland	22 February 2017	Kuala Lumpur, Malaysia	Mlondi Solomon Dlamini (High Commissioner)		
Sweden	10 November 2021	Kuala Lumpur, Malaysia	Dr Joachim Bergstrom		
Switzerland	10 September 2019	Kuala Lumpur, Malaysia	Andrea Reichlin		
Syrian Arab Republic	27 August 2017	Kuala Lumpur, Malaysia	Vacant; Tamim Madani (Chargé d'affaires a.i.)		
Tajikistan	18 July 2019	Selangor, Malaysia	Ardasher Saeed Jaafar Qodri		
Tanzania	19 September 2016	Kuala Lumpur, Malaysia	Ramadhani Kitwana Dau (High Commissioner)		
Thailand	22 March 2021	Kuala Lumpur, Malaysia	Chainarong Keratiyutwong		
Timor-Leste	4 August 2017	Kuala Lumpur, Malaysia	Maria Olandina Isabel Caeiro Alves		
Togo		Tokyo, Japan	Steve Aléwabia Délali Aklesso Bodjona (Chargé d'affaires)		
Tonga	22 August 2012	Deakin, Australian Capital Territory, Australia	Angelika Latufuipeka Tuku’aho (High Commissioner)		
Tunisia	29 December 2015	Jakarta, Indonesia	Mourad Belhassen		
Turkey	1 December 2017	Kuala Lumpur, Malaysia	Merve Safa Kavakcı		
Turkmenistan	7 November 2018	Kuala Lumpur, Malaysia	Muhammetnyyaz Mashalov		
Uganda	6 November 2017	Kuala Lumpur, Malaysia	Samali Dorothy Hyuha (High Commissioner)		
Ukraine	18 July 2016	Kuala Lumpur, Malaysia	Olexander Nechytaylo		
United Arab Emirates	13 February 2017	Kuala Lumpur, Malaysia	Khalid Ghanim Al-Ghaith		
United Kingdom	18 March 2019	Kuala Lumpur, Malaysia	Charles Hay (High Commissioner)	List	
United States of America	27 February 2021	Kuala Lumpur, Malaysia	Brian McFeeters	List	
Uruguay	17 August 2017	Kuala Lumpur, Malaysia	Nury Bauzan Benzano		
Uzbekistan	5 July 2018	Selangor, Malaysia	Ravshan Usmanov		
Venezuela	1 September 2015	Kuala Lumpur, Malaysia	Vacant; Morella Antoni Baretto López (Chargé d'affaires a.i.)		
Vietnam	8 December 2020	Kuala Lumpur, Malaysia	Tran Viet Thai		
Yemen	2 December 2016	Kuala Lumpur, Malaysia	Adel Mohamed Ali Ba Hamid		
Zambia	4 September 2015	Kuala Lumpur, Malaysia	Walubita Imakando (High Commissioner)		
Zimbabwe	2 November 2018	Selangor, Malaysia	Vacant; Isheanope Fanuel Rufu (Chargé d'affaires a.i.)		

== See also ==
- Foreign relations of Malaysia
- List of diplomatic missions in Malaysia
