= Zaki =

- Gender: Male
- Language: Arabic

Origin
- Origin: Arabic
- Meaning: "Pure", "virtuous", "intelligent"

Other names
- Variant form: Zeki

Zaki (Arabic: زكي) is an Arabic male name and surname. Zaki is a Quranic name meaning "pure", "virtuous", or "intelligent".

== People with the given name ==
- Zaki al-Arsuzi (1899–1998), Syrian politician
- Zaki Tun Azmi (born 1945), Malaysian judge
- Zaki Badawi (1922–2006), Egyptian Islamic scholar
- Zaki Badr (1926–1997), Egyptian security officer and politician
- Zaki Chehab (born 1956), Lebanese-British journalist
- Zaki Harari (1926–1979) , Jewish Egyptian Olympic basketball player
- Zaki al-Khatib (1887–1961), Syrian politician
- Zaki Naguib Mahmoud (1905–1993), Egyptian philosopher
- Zaki Mazboudi (1920–2000), Lebanese politician
- Zaki Nassif (1918–2004), Lebanese composer
- Zaki Nusseibeh (died 2004), UAE diplomat
- Zaki Rostom (1903–1978), Egyptian actor
- Zaki Ubaidillah (born 2007), Indonesian badminton player

== People with the middle name ==
- Muhammad Zaki Butt (1929–1993), Pakistani air force pilot
- Salih Zaki Bey (1900–1969), Iraqi Politician

== People with the surname ==
- Aamir Zaki, Pakistani guitar player
- Abbas Zaki, Palestinian politician
- Ahmad Zaki (disambiguation), several persons
- Akram Zaki, Pakistani politician
- Amadou Aboubakar Zaki (born 1988), Nigerien basketball player
- Amin Zaki (1941–2019), Sudanese footballer
- Amr Zaki (born 1983), Egyptian footballer
- Badr Zaki (born 1988), Moroccan footballer
- Gihane Zaki (born 1966), Egyptian egyptologist
- Ibrahim Hussain Zaki (born 1947), Maldivian politician
- Kawthar Zaki (born 1940), Egyptian-American microwave engineer
- Kim Khan Zaki (born 1982), Singaporean kickboxer
- Mohamed Ahmed Zaki (born 1956), Egyptian general
- Mohamed Zaki (born 1953), Maldivian businessman
- Mona Zaki (born 1976), Egyptian actress
- Muad Mohamed Zaki (born 1982), Maldivian politician
- Muhamed Amin Zaki (1880–1948), Kurdish historian and politician
- Safa Zaki, American psychologist, cognitive scientist, and academic administrator
- Soheir Zaki (1945–2026), Egyptian belly dancer and actress
- Toma Adly Zaki (born 1966), Egyptian Coptic Catholic bishop
- Wissam Zaki (born 1986), Iraqi footballer
- Zakia Zaki (died 2007), Afghan journalist
- Zeeko Zaki (born 1990), American actor of Egyptian descent
