= Mohamed Munavvar =

Maldivian politician

- މުޙައްމަދު މުނައްވަރު
- Munavvar in 2008

President of the Special Presidential Commission of Inquiry
- In office 27 April 2025 – 13 July 2025
- President: Mohamed Muizzu
- Preceded by: Position created
- Succeeded by: Position abolished

Attorney General
- In office 11 November 1993 – 11 November 2003
- President: Maumoon Abdul Gayoom
- Preceded by: Ahmed Zahir
- Succeeded by: Hassan Saeed

Personal details
- Born: 20 December 1961 (age 64) Meedhoo. Addu City, Maldives
- Party: Maldivian Democratic Party (2004–2008)
- Education: Patrice Lumumba Peoples' Friendship University of Russia (LL.M); Schulich School of Law (SJD)

Mohamed Munavvar (Dhivehi: މުޙައްމަދު މުނައްވަރު; born 20 December 1961) is a Maldivian politician who served as the Attorney General of the Maldives from 1993 to 2003. He also served as the President of the Special Presidential Commission of Inquiry in 2025.

== Early life and education ==
Munavvar was born in the island of Meedhoo. His education qualifications include; Master of Laws with Honours (LL.M.), with specialisation in International Law, 1985, Patrice Lumumba Peoples' Friendship University of Russia. He received his Doctor of Juridical Science at the Schulich School of Law, Dalhousie University.

== Career ==
=== Political career ===
Dr. Munavvar served as the attorney general of the Maldives for ten years, until 2003.

He also served as the MP of Addu constituency for a decade. He was arrested and jailed on 13 August 2004, allegedly for participating in the pro democracy uprising, also known as Black Friday. On 5 December 2004 he was charged under the article 29 of the Maldives Penal Code "Acts against the State". The charge carries a sentence of imprisonment for life or exile for life or imprisonment or exile for a period between ten years and fifteen years. The opposition and the international community alleged that the charges were politically motivated and subsequently the charges were dropped by the government on 10 December 2004.

In 2004, Munavvar joined the Maldivian Democratic Party.

On 2 June 2007 Dr. Munavvar was elected as the president of MDP, then the largest opposition party in the Maldives. On 13 August 2008 Dr. Munavvar resigned from MDP presidency.

In 2023, he announced that he was planning on running as Independent in the 2023 Maldivian presidential election, but later decided not to contest. He later backed PPM-PNC's candidate, Mohamed Muizzu, in that election.

=== Lawyer career ===
In 2024, he was appointed by the Maldivian government to review the International Tribunal for the Law of the Sea's decision that resulted in the loss of a portion of the Exclusive economic zone of Maldives.

In 2025, President Mohamed Muizzu appointed Munavvar as the President of the Special Presidential Commission of Inquiry into the Incident that Occurred in Malé on 18 April 2025. He vowed to resign if the commission ever faced any influences during its investigation into Yumn's fall. He was also criticized for being unsure as to why the commission was formed.
