= Black Friday (2004) =

- ކަޅު ހުކުރު
- Date: 13 August 2004
- Location: Malé
- Goals: Release of the detained reformists; Release of the Sandhaanu prisoners; Release of Naushad Waheed; Resignation of President Maumoon Abdul Gayoom; Resignation of Abdulla Yameen (Minister of Trade); Resignation of Abdulla Hameed (Minister of Atolls)
- Methods: Protests, Reformist Movement

Parties
Government of the Maldives	(Maldives) Reformist Movement

Black Friday (Dhivehi: ކަޅު ހުކުރު), 13 August 2004, was the crackdown by the Maldivian National Security Service (NSS) — later Maldivian National Defence Force — on a peaceful protest in the capital city of Maldives, Malé. This unplanned and unorganized demonstration was the largest such protest in the country's history. Beginning on the evening of August 12, 2004, the demonstration grew and continued until it was forcefully ended on the afternoon of August 13, 2004. Protesters initially demanding the freeing of the pro-reformists arrested on the afternoon of August 12, 2004. As the protest continued to grow, people demanded the resignation of president Maumoon Abdul Gayoom, who had been in power since 1978. What started as a peaceful demonstration ended after 22 hours, as the country's darkest day in recent history. Several people were severely injured as NSS personnel used riot batons and teargas on unarmed civilians.

Pursuant to the powers vested in him by Section 144 of the Constitution — and for only the second time in Maldives history — president Maumoon Abdul Gayoom declared a State of Emergency in Malé and the nearby islands a few minutes after the crackdown. Several members of the Majlis, former cabinet ministers, and many reformists were arrested. As a symbol of unity, President Gayoom pardoned all arrested following the December 26th tsunami.

== Demonstration ==
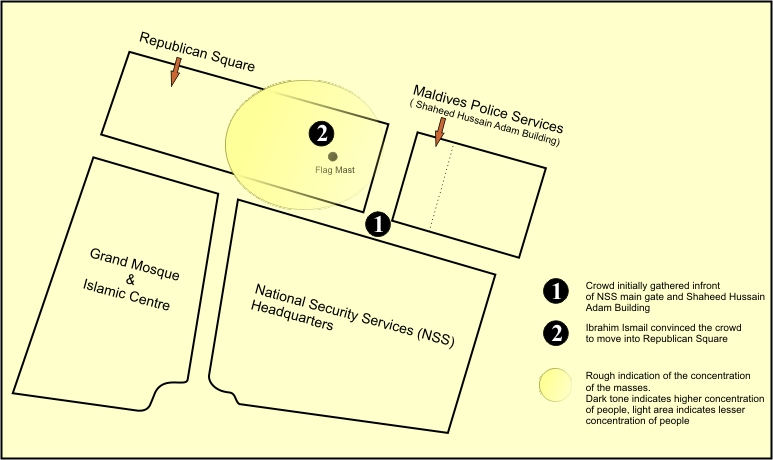
Map indicating the crowd gathering

When police summoned Mr. Mohamed Yusuf, a few reform activists decided to gather near Republican Square to inquire about Yoosuf's detention. What started as a vigil at Republican Square in Malé at dusk on August 12, 2004, turned into a mass gathering of people demanding democratic reform.

As the crowd grew larger and the demands to free Mr. Yoosuf became louder, he was released that afternoon. However, the protesters demanded four other reformists detained in Dhoonidhoo detention centre be transferred to Malé. They also called for the release of Naushad Waheed, Ahmed Didi, Mohamed Zaki and Fathimath Nisreen; all of whom were, according to the Opposition movement, detained without a fair trial. By early morning August 13, 2004, a large crowd had gathered near Republican Square, the NSS building and Shaheed Hussain Adam Building. Initially the NSS and government minister Ilyas Ibrahim unsuccessfully tried to win the trust of the crowd by addressing the crowd over a megaphone. When they failed, they asked the pro-reformist MP Ibrahim Ismail (Ibra) to address the crowd in front of the NSS building. He convinced the crowd to move into nearby Republican Square. Senior MDP activist Muad Mohamed Zaki who was in the front row of the protest blocking the NSS building tried to discourage protestors from moving their position.

After moving the crowd into Republican Square, Ibrahim Ismail addressed the crowd and assured them he would take their demands to the NSS authorities for their consideration. The crowd then gave its demands to Ibrahim Ismail, which were:

- Release of the detained reformists
- Release of Sandhaanu prisoners (Writers of an Internet magazine)
- Release of Naushad Waheed (Artist and reformist)
- Resignation of the President Maumoon Abdul Gayoom
- Resignation of Yameen Abdul Gayoom (Minister of Trade and brother of Gayoom)
- Resignation of Abdullah Hameed (Minister of Atolls and brother of Gayoom)

In the early morning, the reformists were released. They came directly from the Dhoonidhoo detention centre to Republican Square. There they addressed the crowd, criticized Maumoon Abdul Gayoom and called for his resignation. They also demanded the demonstration be reported live on state run television and radio. However, no news of the protest was transmitted yet. The crowd continued to grow and "took (on) a life of its own", as later described by Ibrahim Ismail in his interview on the BBC.

At around 0700 hrs Maafushi Prison was broken, thinking the government was overthrown, as the detainees got the news of the unusual protest in Malé. They headed to Malé in two Dhonis. However they were intercepted by the NSS coastguard. One of the Dhonis was sunk and the other gassed with tear gas.

== Crackdown ==
As the calling for Gayoom's resignation got louder and stronger, a few pro-government people gathered to Republican Square. Some of them were sent there, according to reformists, to create violence so that use of force to disperse the crowd could be justified. Since international media was reporting the event, NSS needed a valid and justifiable reason to use force to disperse the crowd. In several occasions the pro-government crowd tried to instigate violence. However reformists ignored them and continued the demonstration, calling for the resignation.

At around 0830hrs, a person named Hussain Yoosuf stabbed two police officers. He is one of the many people who testified before the commission established to investigate the death of Evan Naseem. After this incident there was a report of fire in the nearby Huravee Building, a government office building. NSS blamed the crowd for starting the fire. In addition to this, there came a group of people who threw bottles and other objects towards the Police Headquarters. The protesters tried to stop them without any success. Police blamed reformists for these activities and portrayed them as a violent mob.

After Friday prayers, at around 1430hrs NSS issued final warning to the crowd. However they refuse to leave the Republican square. Using the previously described commotion as an excuse, the riot police pounced on the protesters, beat them brutally with truncheons and arrested a number of protesters. Women were also beaten with truncheons and they sustained severe injuries. Ambulances were rushed to the hospital with casualties. Tear gas was used on the crowd at around 1500hrs. Senior MDP member Muad Mohamed Zaki was violently beaten by seven NSS officers with wooden planks in broad daylight as he was dragged to the NSS Headquarters. This alerted the British Parliament and European Union officials that Muad was communicating closely with while he staying in the UK representing Maldivian Democratic Party and working to free Sandhaanu political prisoners in Maldives. Thousands of protestors were blindfolded, handcuffed and beaten on that day as law and order seemed to have temporarily disappeared.

== State of Emergency ==
President Maumoon Abdul Gayoom declared a State of Emergency in Malé and nearby islands, pursuant to powers vested in him by Section 144 of the Constitution, for the second time in the Maldives history. A curfew was imposed in Malé with heavy security. There were several roadblocks and check posts.

After nearly two months, the State of Emergency was lifted due to International pressure.

== Internet and SMS service taken offline ==
Dhiraagu and Focus Infocom was forced to shut down Internet and SMS services to prevent the images, video and news of the event leaking to international media. However the events were covered and the images did leak to media despite these preventive measurements.

== Local media reporting ==
Both Television Maldives (TVM) and Voice of Maldives (VOM), controlled by the government, initially did not report the event as a major event. At 1400hrs news, while the protest was still going, TVM reported that "only a small crowd had gathered and caused disharmony at the Republican Square, the people who caused this had been noted and that action will be taken against them". At 2000hrs news, after declaring the State of Emergency, TVM downplayed the size of the protesters, and called the gathering "illegal in every possible sense".

Special programs were aired on Radio and Television to cover-up the real reason behind the protest. It was portrayed by the local media to be a violent mob that attacked police building, government properties and attack police officers. One sided, biased reporting was aired for weeks on the local media.

== One year anniversary demonstration ==
On August 12, 2005, to mark the first anniversary of the Black Friday, members of the Maldivian Democratic Party and pro-reformists started gathering near Republican Square. Despite heavy police and NSS presence, at around 4:30pm local time Mohamed Nasheed - Chairman of the MDP - along with other several leading members of the party, decided to gather at Republican square. Security was tight around Malé due to the obvious perceptibility of such a demonstration to mark this anniversary. Two days before, on August 10, 2005, NSS announced that they will be conducting a huge training exercise in Malé for four days, starting from August 11, 2005.

Despite heavy police presence, Mohamed Nasheed decided to sit right in the center of the Republican Square with his colleagues. Minutes later he was approached by a team of Maldives Police Service. They approached him and asked him to simply "go away" from there. Nasheed demanded to know why he was asked to leave while he is not committing anything illegal. The leader of this team responded by saying such gatherings are illegal and they will have to remove him by force if not obeyed within five minutes. To this ultimatum, Nasheed responded by saying. "You will give us five minutes, after that, what? You will beat us to death?" At one time Nasheed asked the police to join them, since he is not inciting violence but peacefully sitting there. Since he refused to leave the spot, the police team moved towards the flag pole few meters away.

At around 4:23pm, riot police moved into Republican Square. Soon they surrounded Mohamed Nasheed along with other members of the party, present with him. Nasheed and his colleagues still refused to stand up. Members of riot police then forcefully removed them and had them taken into the nearby NSS headquarters. This led to civil unrest in Malé and some other atolls, that lasted for three nights. The unrest was controlled and several people were arrested.
