= Ahmed Thasmeen Ali =

Maldivian politician and businessman (born 1966)

- އަޙްމަދު ތަސްމީން ޢަލީ
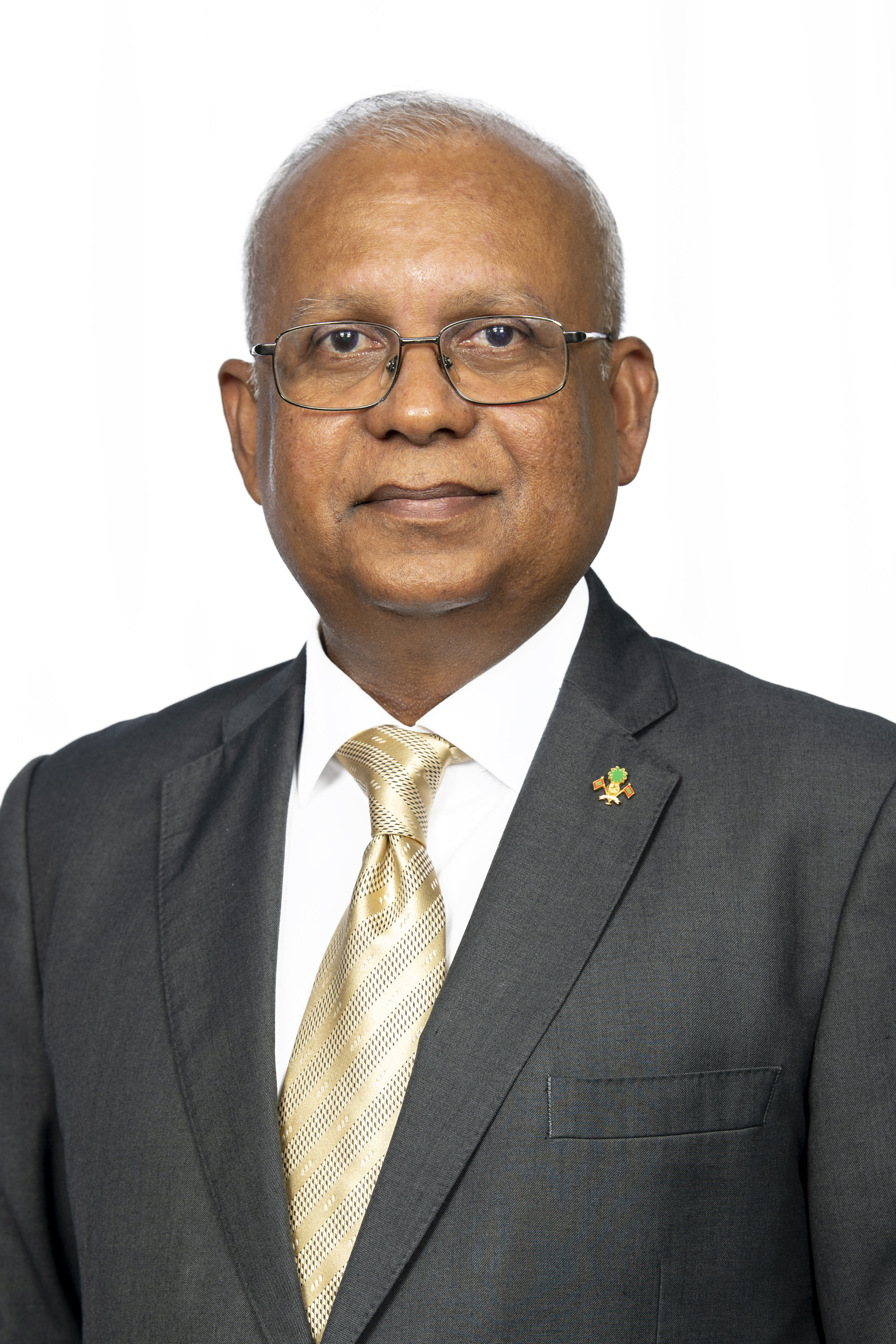
- Official portrait, 2022

High Commissioner of the Maldives to Singapore
- In office 25 August 2022 – 26 December 2023
- Appointed by: Ibrahim Mohamed Solih
- Preceded by: Ibrahim Shaheeb
- Succeeded by: Mohamed Luveiz

Deputy Speaker of the People's Majlis
- In office 1993–1998
- President: Maumoon Abdul Gayoom
- Speaker: Ahmed Hameed

Member of the People's Majlis
- In office 28 May 2009 – 29 May 2019
- President: Mohamed Nasheed; Mohamed Waheed Hassan; Abdulla Yameen; Ibrahim Mohamed Solih
- Constituency: Kendhoo
- In office 27 February 1995 – 28 May 2009
- President: Maumoon Abdul Gayoom; Mohamed Nasheed
- Succeeded by: Constituency abolished
- Constituency: Baa Atoll

Minister of Atolls Development
- In office 2007–2008
- President: Maumoon Abdul Gayoom
- Preceded by: Abdulla Hameed
- Succeeded by: Mohamed Waheed Deen

Minister of Home Affairs
- In office 14 July 2005 – 25 June 2007
- President: Maumoon Abdul Gayoom
- Preceded by: Ismail Shafeeu
- Succeeded by: Abdulla Kamaludeen

Personal details
- Born: 30 August 1966 (age 59) Henveiru, Malé, Maldives
- Party: Maldivian Democratic Party (2013–present)
- Other political affiliations: Dhivehi Rayyithunge Party (2005–2013)
- Spouse: Visam Ali
- Children: 1
- Website: thasmeen.org (archived)

Ahmed Thasmeen Ali (Dhivehi: އަޙްމަދު ތަސްމީން ޢަލީ; born 30 September 1966), is a Maldivian politician, diplomat, philanthropist and a businessman who was the former leader of the Dhivehi Rayyithunge Party. Thasmeen started his career as a civil servant and after venturing into politics he was elected to Peoples Majlis from Baa Atoll and later he served in Maldives President Maumoon Abdul Gayoom's cabinet and was his running mate in the first multiparty election held in the Maldives in 2008.

His first Cabinet portfolio was Minister of Atolls Development and later served as Minister of Home Affairs from 2005 to 2007.

He is the former leader of the opposition political party, Dhivehi Rayyithunge Party and Minority Leader in the People's Majlis until May 2012.

== Education, family early career ==
He holds a BA degree in economics from University of Warwick in England and a master's degree in political science of the American University in Cairo, Egypt. Thasmeen is married to Ms. Visam Ali MP for R. Maduvvari and the couple have a child. Thasmeen practices diving, snorkeling, sea sports and fishing in his free time. Besides native language Dhivehi he is fluent English and understands Arabic. Ahmed Thasmeen Ali owns resorts and other businesses, including Reethi Beach Resort and Fonaddhoo Tuna Products. He is a philanthropist.

Mr. Thasmeen was active in student association activities in England and in Cairo, Egypt.

He was the MP for Baa Atoll from 1995 and in 2009 and 2014, the MP for Kendhoo.

== Political career ==
Thasmeen is active in politics since 1994 and was elected to Parliament for the first time in 1994. Since then he has been representing Baa Kendhoo Constituency. In addition to that he has held various posts as a civil servant at the Ministry of Youth and Sports, Ministry of Economic Development and Trade and later he served as Minister of Atolls Development and Minister of Home Affairs.

- Deputy Speaker of the Parliament from 1993 to 1998.
- Deputy Leader of DRP, elected with the highest votes in the party's first congress.
- Represented Maldives Parliament at various Commonwealth Parliamentary meetings.

In the October 2008 presidential election, he was the running mate of Maumoon Abdul Gayoom, who was Asia's longest-serving President.

== Maldives Police Capacity Building ==
Maldives Police Service was introduced as a separate civilian agency during Mr. Thasmeen's tenure as Minister of Home Affairs. He embarked on recruiting new police personnel and introduced Jail reform activities with the help from Western Australia Police to comply with international human rights norms. He started construction of a maximum security prison with a vision to improve the living condition for inmates.

The first Police Training School, housed in Addu Atoll was opened under his patronage.

Many modern scientific methods of investigation in Maldives Police Service were introduced under his instruction, including establishing Forensic Labs and deployment of CCTV camera in strategic points in Malé. The Community Policing concept used in policing in the Maldives is introduced under his guidance.

In a leaked cable titled PROSPECTS FOR REFORM DOMINATE DISCUSSIONS IN MALDIVES the followings were noted: "Home Affairs Minister Ahmed Thasmeen Ali join a cabinet that is growing younger and more dynamic as President Gayoom continues to make changes in an effort to prompt progress in the Special Majlis (parliament) that is considering constitutional reforms.

"Thasmeen Ali was keen to continue to develop the capacity of the national police force, which was split from the National Security Service late last year. He also outlined plans to develop a separate, well-trained prison service and to construct a new prison on Maafushi, noting that the current prison there, in which prisoners are kept in large common areas rather than smaller cells, makes it almost impossible to control or remove individual prisoners. He noted that his ministry, as part of the GoRM decision to invite the ICRC in to look at prison conditions, will work from ICRC standards as it designs the new prison".

== Party to new heights ==
During Thasmeen's leadership he took DRP to a new height. Though DRP was defeated in the 2008 presidential election he managed to increase the party membership and made gains in the parliamentary election and local elections.

With Thasmeen at the helm DRP secured more seats in the parliament than Nasheed's ruling MDP. This is a major victory to DRP, especially since this came during the honeymoon period of the new government.

During the split of the party there was much criticism leveled to Thasmeen by Gayoom supporters accusing Thasmeen of the 2008 defeat. However, DRP issued a statement reflecting of the past success in elections under Thasmeen saying "we note with regret that the party was unable to win a single election under President Maumoon’s leadership when it was in the government".

"One of the main reasons for DRP having to face one of its biggest defeats (2008 Presidential Election) and MDP coming to power and causing despair for most citizens was the fact that the whole presidential campaign was run by Gayoom’s eldest son Faris Maumoon as a family matter", said a DRP statement. However, the gains DRP made in the parliamentary election did not last long. With the internal conflict it took a toll on party in terms on numbers in the parliament and Gayoom formed a new political party.

With the formation of PPM, DRP accused PPM of poaching members and later in the parliament it paved way for President Nasheed's MDP to gain majority on the floor.

== GMR Issue ==
With the internal strife going on in DRP, the Deputy Leader of DRP Umar Naseer alleged that Thasmeen and Speaker of the Parliament met GMR, then new operator of Maldives International Airport, and the company had bribed them. Speaking to Miadhu Daily Thasmeen said there is no reasonable motive for GMR to hold secret talks with him and the leasing of the airport came in a time when People's Majlis is tirelessly working on securing state assets. Replying to a question on what can be done Thasmeen said "The matter is in judicial phase. Then what else can be done? It is impossible to hold demonstrations in the airport and cause strife there. Should we destroy the tourism industry of this country?”

The Anti-Corruption Commission investigated the matter and questioned Umar Naseer and Gayoom and issued a report saying the commission was not provided with any solid evidence to make these allegations. In his testimonies to ACC, the Honorary Leader of DRP, Gayyoom said that he was informed about the trip of Thasmeen and Shahid from the media and he got a SMS message stating the same. However, he said that he does not remember the sender.

== Political positions ==
- Supported to streamline the civil service and supported civil service bill in the parliament.
- Advocated to pass the media bill by the parliament and criticized the government of suppressing media.
- A month before President Nasheed's resignation Thasmeen described Nasheed saying 'who claims to be the vanguard of democracy is becoming more and more despotic'.
- Thasmeen scolded President Nasheed's government's violent demonstrations and corrupt practices describing than ruling party as "drenched in corruption"
- Criticized the government of exerting political influence upon Maldives Police service and asked the officers not to obey the unlawful orders issued by the high command and not erode the aspirations of Maldives' reformers.
- Thasmeen criticized Mohamed Nasheed's government of transgressing upon the values of democracy and causing intimidation against state institutes.
- Thasmeen criticized the government's failure in strengthening the economy and scaring foreign investors and eroding business confidence.
- In his Islamic New Year Statement Thasmeen said that President Nasheed's government has promoted aniti-Islamic ideology for the past three years.
- Thasmeen defeated a no confidence motion against President Nasheed which was initiated by 47 MPs in October 2011.
- Thasmeen criticized PPM of following a political system which follows personalities instead of democratic rule.
- Thasmeen criticized President Maumoon Abdul Gayoom for going against DRP charter.
- After party in-fighting Thasmeen asked anti-party elements to resign from party if they act against party charter.
- Thasmeen called government to support for a Palestinian state.
- Raised concerns against Nasheed's government's fiscal and economic reform program.
- Thasmeen joined the Maldivian Democratic Party in 2013.
- Thasmeen was appointed by President Ibrahim Mohamed Solih as the High Commissioner of the Maldives to Singapore in 2022.
