= Nahula =

Nahula is a surname. Notable people with the surname include:

- Aishath Nahula (born 1982), Maldivian politician
- Fathimath Nahula (born 1973), Maldivian film director, producer, and screenwriter
