= Zekiye =

Zekiye is a Turkish given name for females. Notable people with the name include:

- Zekiye Keskin Şatır (born 1976), Turkish archer
- Zekiye Sultan (1872–1950), Ottoman princess

== See also ==
- Zeki
