= Ibrahim Ismail =

Ibrahim Ismail may refer to:

== Full name ==
- Ibrahim Ismail (politician), Maldivian politician
- Ibrahim Ismail of Johor (born 1958), Sultan of Johor
- Ibrahim Ismail (general), Malaysian General, Chief of the Defence Forces (1970–77)

== Given names ==
- Ibrahim Ismail Muftah (born 1972), Qatari athlete
- Ibrahim Ismail Chundrigar (1897-1960), sixth prime minister of Pakistan

== Other ==
- Ibrahim Ismail Chundrigar Road
