= Presidential Youth Advisory Board =

Maldivian Youth Advisory Board

Maldivian Youth Advisory Board
- ދިވެހި ޒުވާނުންގެ ޤައުމީ ލަފާދޭ ކޮމިޓީ

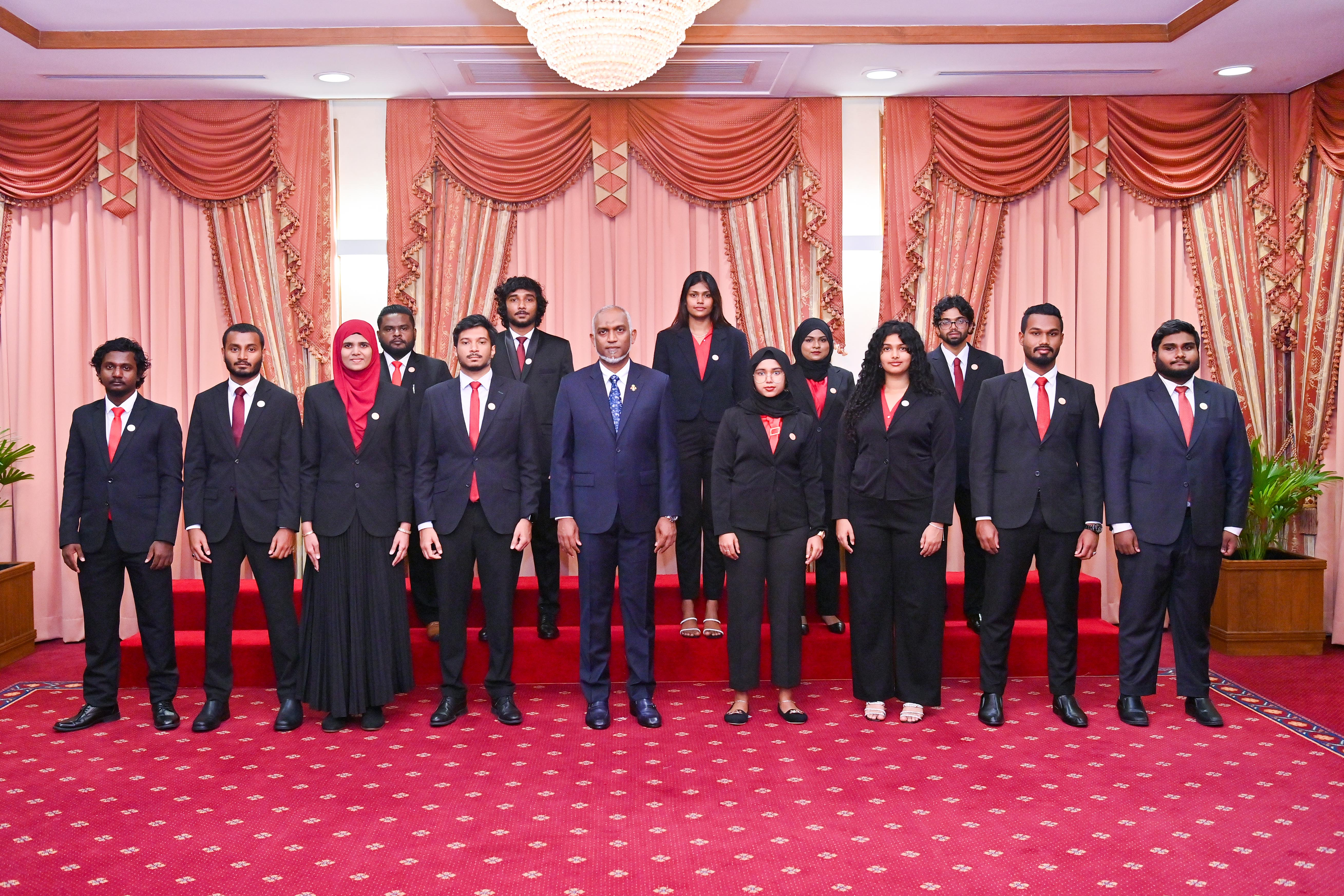
- The Maldivian Presidential Youth Advisory Board Members (2024)
- Abbreviation: Youth Organisation
- Formation: 2024; 2 years ago
- Location: Youth Third Space, Malé
- President: Fathmath Nazaha Nazeem

The Presidential Youth Advisory Board (PYAB) was established by President Dr. Mohamed Muizzu in 2024 as a forum to bring youth voices into policy-making. Announced in December 2023, its official mission is to advise the President on youth-related issues and incorporate “the opinions and aspirations of youngsters” in government policy. A press release explained that the Board's objective is to “confer with President Dr. Muizzu on the implementation of the Administration’s manifesto and important policies, identify obstacles and challenges to youth development… and work towards solutions at the national and regional levels”.The 15-member Board was formally constituted on 18 January 2024 and inaugurated on 12 August 2024 as part of the government's manifesto pledge to empower youth in shaping the country's future.

The inaugural members were drawn from all sectors of Maldivian youth. Public Service Media reported that appointments included two members chosen by the President, representatives of national-level athletes, youth in arts and crafts, youth NGOs, government‐appointed youth, and university student councils. This diverse composition – including athletes, artists, student leaders and others – was intended to ensure broad youth participation in advising on education, employment, entrepreneurship and other development issues.

== Leadership ==
At its formation, the Board was chaired by Daud (Dawood) Ahmed Zalil, an Under-Secretary at the President's Office. Zalil (also spelled Ahmed Daud or Ahmed Dawood in press reports) was an experienced civil servant in strategic communications and digital policy. He was appointed to the Board by President Muizzu on 12 August 2024. and served as its first president (chairperson). In April 2025, Zalil resigned from the Board, a decision accepted by the President. Official reports later disclosed that a Special Presidential Commission found he had provided false testimony in a criminal investigation, leading to his dismissal from government service As of January 2026, no new chair has been publicly announced. The Board's vice-chair (Vice President) is Fathmath Nazaha Nazeem, who was elected to that post at the Board's first meeting. Nazeem had been a President-appointed member of the Board and continues to represent youth in Board activities.

== Objectives ==
According to government sources, the PYAB's purpose is to empower young people and integrate their input into national development. The President's Office emphasized that a key manifesto goal was “to empower the youth to make decisions and take the lead in shaping the future of the country, addressing the concerns of young people, and fostering a strong generation of youth”. In line with this, the advisory board is charged with highlighting barriers faced by youth (for example, in education, housing, or entrepreneurship) and proposing policy solutions. By design, the Board is renewed mid-term to “facilitate more significant youth participation” – it will be re-appointed twice over each presidential term. The Board also organizes national youth forums: for instance, in December 2025 it co-hosted a two-day National Youth Conference in Malé, drawing delegates from across the atolls to discuss youth policy and development. The conference outcomes were to be presented to the President, demonstrating the Board's role in directly channeling youth perspectives into government decision-making.

== Controversies ==
=== Yumn's fall controversy ===
The Board was caught up in a national scandal following the mysterious fall of 21-year-old Hawwa Yumna Rasheed in April 2025. Several Board members publicly resigned in solidarity with youth-led protests demanding justice. Media reported that members Aminath Rabaaba Ibrahim, Huwaina Mohamed Nihad, Fathimath Raaia Shareef, and Nimal Hameed all announced their resignations amid the outcry. Atoll Times noted that these departures came as demonstrations were calling for accountability over the incident. This fallout highlighted criticisms of the Board: its then-chair, Daud Ahmed Zalil, was the brother of a Raudh Ahmed Zilal in the case, and videos surfaced appearing to show partygoers (including Zalil) consuming drugs at the scene's vicinity. (These revelations led to calls for the entire Board to step down.) The inquiry into the Yumna Rasheed case led to official action against the Board's chairman. In December 2025 PSM reported that a Special Presidential Commission concluded Daud Ahmed Zalil had given false testimony during the investigation. President Muizzu's office confirmed that Zalil had been suspended from his government role on 24 April and had tendered his resignation as board chair that same day. He was later formally dismissed from his undersecretary post on grounds of misconduct. These developments were viewed as evidence that the Advisory Board's independence had been compromised by conflicts of interest, since the chair was closely connected to the case under review.

=== Vaping scandal ===
In another controversy, Board member Abdulla Mahil Shaheem (the son of an Islamic minister Mohamed Shaheem) resigned in August 2025 after authorities discovered he had brought a banned vaping device into the Maldives. SunOnline reported that Shaheem, who was appointed to the Board the previous year, stepped down following a customs fine for the infraction. His high-profile departure (a second cabinet minister's relative to leave the Board in 2025) further fueled criticism that the Youth Advisory initiative was marred by nepotism and misconduct.
