= List of high commissioners of the Maldives to Malaysia =

Coordinates: 3.155509°N 101.722807°E

High Commissioner of the Maldives to Malaysia
- Emblem of the Republic of Maldives

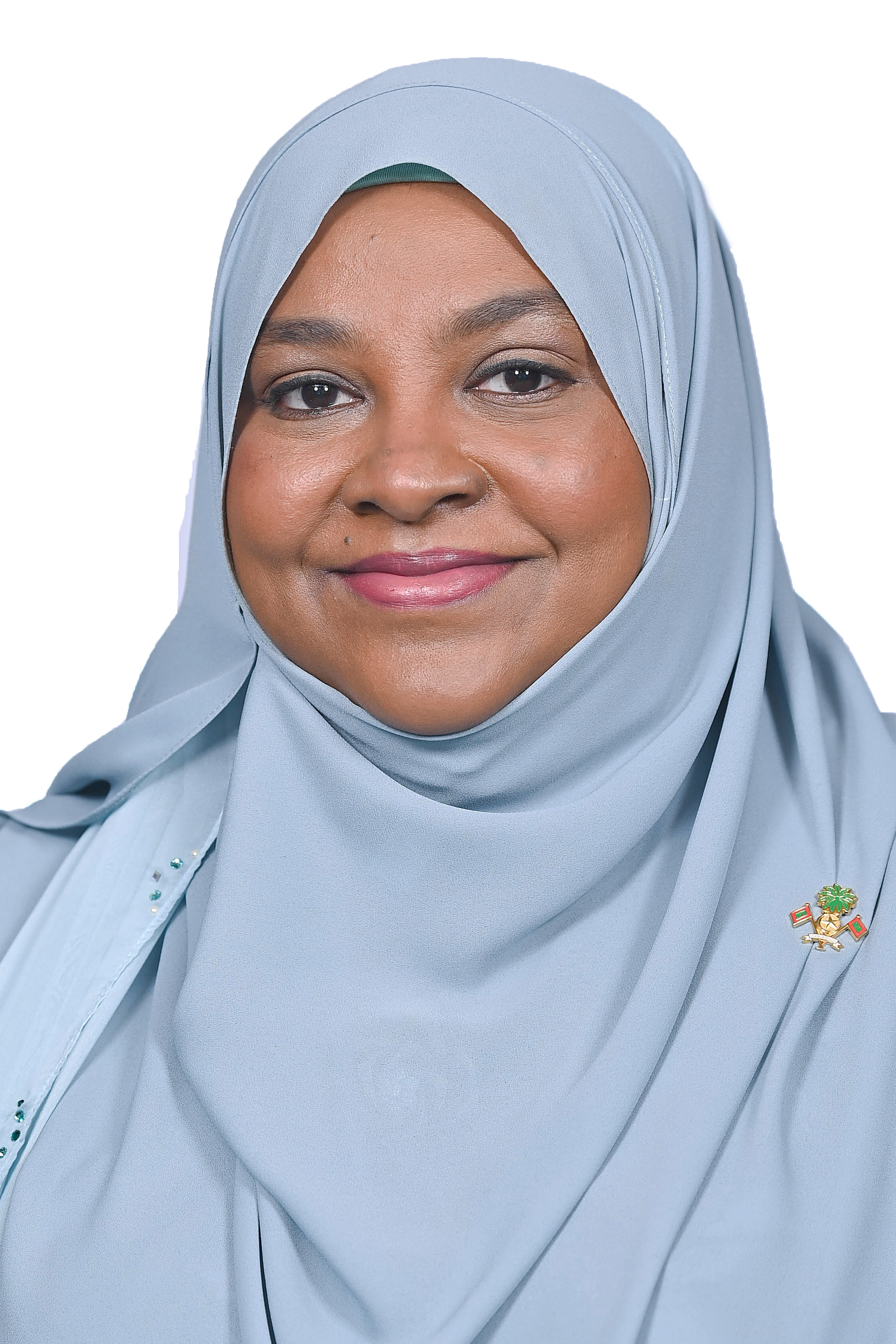
- Incumbent; Mariyam Shabeena Ahmed since 7 May 2024
- Style: Her Excellency
- Seat: Kuala Lumpur, Malaysia
- Appointer: The president of the Maldives
- Deputy: Mizna Shareef
- Website: maldives.org.my

The high commissioner of the Republic of Maldives to Malaysia is the head of the Maldives's diplomatic mission to Malaysia. The position has the rank and status of an ambassador extraordinary and plenipotentiary and is based in the High Commission of the Maldives, Kuala Lumpur. At least formally, between October 2016 and 1 February 2020 when the Maldives were not part of the Commonwealth, the title was "ambassador".

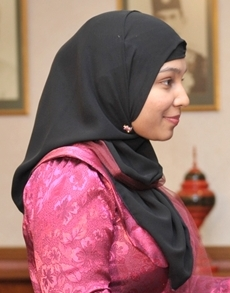
Mizna Shareef, deputy high commissioner

The current high commissioner, Mariyam Shabeena Ahmed, presented her credentials to the Yang di-Pertuan Agong on 7 July 2024.

== List of representatives ==
Diplomatic agrément/Diplomatic accreditation	High Commissioner	Observations	President of the Maldives	Prime Minister of Malaysia	Term end
2007	Midhath Hilmy		Maumoon Abdul Gayoom	Abdullah Ahmad Badawi	2008
23 March 2009	Mohamed Zaki		Mohamed Nasheed	Abdullah Ahmad Badawi	11 November 2013
23 March 2009	Mohamed Zaki		Mohamed Waheed Hassan	Najib Razak	11 November 2013
29 April 2014	Mohamed Fayaz		Abdulla Yameen	Najib Razak	2015
5 November 2015	Mohamed Fahmy Hassan		Abdulla Yameen	Najib Razak	2019
5 November 2015	Mohamed Fahmy Hassan		Ibrahim Mohamed Solih	Mahathir Mohamad	2019
18 July 2019	Visam Ali		Ibrahim Mohamed Solih	Mahathir Mohamad	April 2022
18 July 2019	Visam Ali		Ibrahim Mohamed Solih	Muhyiddin Yassin	April 2022
18 July 2019	Visam Ali		Ibrahim Mohamed Solih	Ismail Sabri Yaakob	April 2022
10 October 2022 / 1 December 2022	Ali Hussain Didi		Ibrahim Mohamed Solih	Anwar Ibrahim	
7 May 2024 / 9 July 2024	Mariyam Shabeena Ahmed		Mohamed Muizzu	Anwar Ibrahim	

== See also ==
- Ambassadors of the Maldives
- Malaysia–Maldives relations
