= Hawwa Yumn Rasheed =

Maldivian woman who fell from Fentenoy building, sparking protests

- ހައްވާ ޔުމްނު ރަޝީދު
- Born: 2003 or 2004 (age 22–23); Galolhu, Malé, Maldives
- Education: Centre for Higher Secondary Education
- Known for: Falling off of Fentenoy building

Hawwa Yumn Rasheed (Note: Some sources call her "Mariyam Yumnu Rasheed", "Mariyam Yumnu", or "Hawwa Yumnu Rasheed" but her name is spelled as Hawwa Yumn Rasheed.) (born 2003–2004) is a Maldivian woman whose suspicious fall from the Fentenoy building sparked the Dhuleh Nukuraanan protests that call for justice of Yumn.

== Fall from Fentenoy ==
Yumn was found severely injured on the rooftop of a warehouse in Henveiru. According to Maldives Police, she fell from the ninth floor skylight of H. Fentenoy. (Note: "H. Fentenoy" meaning Henveiru Fentenoy) She was reported to have been on the rooftop for over three hours before emergency services were called by neighbours.

Initially, Yumn was kept on a ventilator but reported able to breathe on her own but still under the intensive care unit at Indira Gandhi Memorial Hospital (IGMH).

Yumn was transported to Malaysia to undergo spinal operation at Pantai Hospital Penang. One part for the treatment were paid by the government while the other half was raised by donations from the public in under two hours.

Before Yumn fell from Fentenoy, she was allegedly at a party at another house, later identified as Transport Minister Mohamed Ameen's house. The party allegedly had drugs and alcohol involved.

The police received heavy backlash after revealing personal information about Yumn but not any other suspects of the case.

== Investigation ==
Police seized the phones of Raudh Ahmed Zilal, Aishath Layaaly Iqbal, Izdhiyaan Mohamed Maumoon, Yoosuf Ahmed Akram, Yoosuf Yassar Abdul Ghafoor, Aminath Junaidha Jamsheed, Hussain Hamees Ali, Ijaz Jaiz, all of them attended the alleged drug party. These people are also under a travel ban.

The last person who was with Yumn before her fall was Raudh Ahmed Zilal, who is the main suspect for the case. Police originally ruled out foul play but later backtracked. Raudh was designated as a suspect and he was originally not cooperating with investigations until he was arrested under a court order for possible involvement in Yumn's fall, being intoxicated and use for sexual purposes. He was remanded for 10 days and started cooperating with investigations.

According to police, both Yumn and Raudh tested positive for cannabis.

CCTV cameras from the party at Ameen's house wasn't given to the police due to the cameras not working. Raudh later admitted that he saw Yumn falling from the building. It's alleged that Raudh was given special treatment which the police is refusing to comment on.

Due to the Dhuleh Nukuraanan protests, commissioner of police Ali Shujau resigned as part of the demands set by the protesters. President Mohamed Muizzu established a special presidential commission of inquiry to investigate the fall, which received criticism of having all male members, later on adding female members. It was also revealed that Yumn has a permanent elbow injury.

Yumn's sister revealed that on the night of the fall she was with Raudh, Yassar, and four other people who weren't named, she also said that she was pushed off the roof. In response, police said that they haven't gotten to question Yumn as she has been in Malaysia.

The presidential commission that was tasked to investigate her fall began gathering information and visiting key locations. The commission has also questioned Raudh but no details were provided.

== Personal life ==
Yumn was born in the Galolhu district of Malé, Maldives. She attended the Centre for Higher Secondary Education for higher studies.

== See also ==
- Dhuleh Nukuraanan
- Presidential Youth Advisory Board
