= Malaysia–Maldives relations =

- Malaysia: Maldives

Diplomatic mission
- High Commission of Malaysia, Colombo: High Commission of the Maldives, Kuala Lumpur

Envoy
- High Commissioner Tan Yang Thai: High Commissioner Mariyam Shabeena Ahmed

Malaysia–Maldives relations refers to bilateral foreign relations between Malaysia and Maldives. Malaysia's High Commission in Colombo, Sri Lanka is also accredited to the Maldives, and Maldives has a High Commission in Kuala Lumpur.

Both countries are part of the Commonwealth of Nations and the Organisation of Islamic Cooperation.

== History ==
Both countries were once part of the British Empire and the relations between the two countries has been established since 1968. Malaysia has been one of the important partners for Maldives who has made many contributions to the development of Maldives. In 1994 and 2012, agreements on air services and legal co-operation activities were also signed. In 2013, Mohammed Waheed who was the President of Maldives visited the former Prime Minister of Malaysia Mahathir Mohamad to enhance bilateral relations.

== Economic relations ==
Malaysia is one of main import partners for the Maldives, and many Maldivian students have studied in Malaysia. One of Malaysia's Airline carriers, Air Asia was operating scheduled flights to Maldives. Maldives also participated at the World Islamic Tourism Mart in Malaysia to improve their tourism industry.
