= Muad Mohamad Zaki =

Maldivian politician (born 1982)

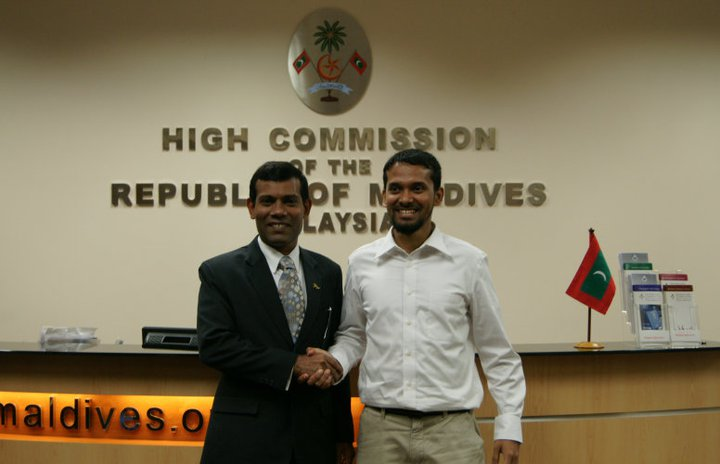
- Zaki (R) standing with Mohamed Nasheed (L)
- Born: 7 April 1982 (age 44); Maafannu, Malé, Maldives
- Other political affiliations: Maldivian Democratic Party (2008–2011)
- Parents: Mohamad Zaki (father); Nazima Asir (mother)
- Website: muadzaki.com

Muad Mohamad Zaki (born 7 April 1982) is a Maldivian politician, democracy advocate, business consultant and motivational speaker.

== Career ==
Muad was one of the people who were behind the Sandhaanu political magazine that criticized Maumoon Abdul Gayoom's government.

Muad was one of the opposition Maldivian Democratic Party members on the streets of Maldives among the hundreds that were brutally cracked down upon by the National Security Service (NSS) during an anti-government demonstration in the Maldives. The demonstration was later known as Black Friday for the people of Maldives. He was detained and suffered multiple injuries and blood loss from the incident. Later, the European Union sent in a fact finding mission to assess the nature of the protests.

Muad began his political activism through his studies on socialism while in the United Kingdom. He was one of the first members of the Maldivian Democratic Party when it was first formed. He also played a big role in communications between the British parliamentarians and European Union to lobby support for the Maldivian opposition party while the party's leader and his relative Mohamed Nasheed was based in Sri Lanka.

Today, Muad Mohamad Zaki is a freelance and independent political consultant who has close relations with all major political parties and politicians in the country. He provides political consultations to government officials and political parties with regard to diplomacy, human rights, counter-terrorism, international relations, and campaign media strategy.

== Personal life ==
Muad is the son of Mohamad Zaki, and is part of the "Nazaki Family", where his father and grandfather held influential societal statuses in the Maldives.

At 21 years old. he pursued further studies in International Relations & Security.

In the 1990s, Zaki migrated to Malaysia with his family during his father's self exile.
