= Maldives National Congress =

Political party in the Maldives from 2007 to 2013

Maldives National Congress މޯލްޑިވިއަން ނެޝަނަލް ކޮންގްރެސް
- Founded: 2007
- Dissolved: 2013

The Maldives National Congress was a political party in the Maldives.Maldives National Congress (MNC) is a political party in the Maldives. It was founded in 2023 by former President Abdulla Yameen Abdul Gayoom and is associated with the People's National Congress (PNC) and the political movement supporting Yameen. The party has participated in Maldivian politics and elections, particularly in opposition to the government of President Mohamed Muizzu.The Maldives National Congress is based in the Maldives and focuses on political issues including governance, economic development, and national sovereignty. Its activities form part of the country's wider multi-party political system.

The party's interim leader was Mohamed Naeem.
