= 2005 Maldives civil unrest =

2005 Maldivian Civil Unrest
- Part of Black Friday
- Date: 12 August 2005
- Location: Malé, Gaafu Dhaalu Atoll and Addu City
- Goals: Release of the detained reformists; Resignation of President Maumoon Abdul Gayoom
- Methods: Protests, Reformist Movement

Parties
Government of the Maldives	(Maldives) Opposition

Lead figures
Maumoon Abdul Gayoom	Mohamed Nasheed

Casualties
- Arrested: 160 (Including Nasheed)

The 2005 Maldivian civil unrest refers to the civil unrest that broke out in Malé, Gaafu Dhaalu Atoll and Addu Atoll of the Maldives on August 12, 2005, which led to events that supported the democratic reform of the country. This unrest was provoked by the arrest of Mohamed Nasheed - an open critic of the president Maumoon Abdul Gayoom - and the subsequent demolition of the Dhunfini tent, used by the members of the Maldivian Democratic Party (MDP) for their gatherings. Supporters of MDP were quick to demonstrate. They started calling for the resignation of Maumoon Abdul Gayoom, soon after Nasheed's arrest. Several arrests were made on the first night followed by the demolition of the Dhunfini tent. The demolition complicated the situation further provoking the unrest. The unrest grew violent on the third night, on August 14, 2005, due to the methods used in the attempts by the authority to stop the demonstration.

The unrest continued intermittently for three nights, from August 12 to August 14, 2005. By August 15, 2005, the uprising was controlled with the presence of heavy security around Malé. Almost a fourth of the city had to be cordoned off during the unrest.

== Mohamed Nasheed's arrest ==
On August 12, 2005, to mark the first anniversary of the Black Friday, members of the Maldivian Democratic Party and pro reformists started gathering near Republican Square. Despite heavy police and National Security Service (NSS) presence, at around 4:30pm local time Mohamed Nasheed along with several other leading members of the party, decided to gather at Republican square. Security was tight around Malé due to the obvious perceptibility of such a demonstration to mark this anniversary. Two days before, on August 10, 2005, NSS announced that they will be conducting a huge training in Malé for four days, starting from August 11, 2005.

Despite heavy police presence, Mohamed Nasheed decided to sit right in the center of the Republican square with his colleagues. Minutes later he was approached by a team of Maldives Police Service. They asked him to simply "go away" from there. Nasheed demanded to know why he was being asked to leave when he was not committing anything illegal. The leader of this team responded by saying such gatherings are illegal and they will have to remove him by force if not obeyed within five minutes. To this ultimatum, Nasheed responded by saying. "You will give us five minutes, after that what? You will beat us to death?" At one time Nasheed asked the police to join them, since he is not inciting violence but peacefully sitting there. Since he refused to leave the spot, the police team moved towards the flag pole few meters away.

At around 4:23 p.m., riot police moved into Republican Square. Soon they surrounded Mohamed Nasheed and other members of the party present with him. Nasheed and his colleagues still refused to leave the area. Members of riot then forcefully removed them and taken into nearby NSS headquarters. Footage of this event was obtained by Minivan News, run from outside the country. Along with Nasheed and shortly after that, several others were arrested.

- Jennifer Latheef
- Latheefa Umar
- Aminath Shareef
- Ahmed Abbas
- Aminath Shareef

== Demolition of the Dhunfini tent ==
Before Nasheed's arrest several members of the MDP went to Dhunfini Haruge (a large tent where MDP conducts most of its activities) for Black Friday remembrance as previously planned. The arrest of Nasheed was instantly learnt by the people present at Dhunfini tent. They started calling for the resignation and the immediate unconditional release of Nasheed in addition to their speeches to mark the Black Friday.

When Nasheed was arrested his supporters near Republican Square expressed their discontent over the matter. Within two hours of his arrest his supporters were on the roads near the Republican Square shouting anti-government chants. By 9:30 p.m., they gathered behind the parliament building with banners calling for the release of people detained earlier. After sometime rallied towards the Dhunfini Haruge. The crowd at Dhunfini vowed not to leave the tent until the government released the members of MDP.

On the early morning of August 13, 2005, police raided Dhunfini Haruge (MDP meeting point) and demolished the stage, podium and destroyed the speaking facilities, claiming that they had found weapons (sharpened iron rods) on the premises. Police cordoned off several areas in the capital of Malé, around the National Security Services, Shaheed Ali Building (Police Headquarters), Republic Square, People's Majlis and Maldivian Democratic Party Headquarters.

=== More arrests ===
Several arrests were made during the morning hours of August 13, 2005, to prevent further demonstrations. Some key people arrested included:

- Shuaib Ali (Furahani)- Democracy campaigner and MDP National Council Member
- Ali Shiyam - Director of AAA Resorts
- Mohamed Ziyad - MDP Councillor

== Unrest and aftermath ==
Protesters

By late afternoon, around 3:00 p.m. on August 13, 2005, MDP members started gathering outside MDP Headquarters - area that was held by the police. By 7:00 p.m. local time the crowd had turned into a large demonstration. This crowd was dispersed by the police using pepper spray.

By about 7:45 p.m. the crowd, once again re-assembled on Majeedhee Magu (one of the main roads in the capital) demanding the immediate release of their Chairman Mohamed Nasheed. Riot police arrived on the scene to disperse the demonstrators, but they held off calling for the immediate resignation of President Maumoon Abdul Gayoom. The police used various methods including baton charges, tear gas, pepper spray and high pressure water cannons on the crowd throughout the night.

Police arrested several demonstrators, whom by 11:00 p.m. had turned to throwing stones on the riot control policemen. The mob grew violent as the police tried to stop them. There were reported casualties of both police and civilians.

On August 14, 2005, a curfew was declared starting from midnight to 4:30 a.m. in Malé. Despite the curfew, people refused to go home. The police controlled the situation by 1:00 am with more arrests. In the morning of August 14, 2005 more people were arrested including CHSE chemistry teacher Imad Solih and Abdul Majid, MDP member and a businessman.

The third night of the demonstration, second night of the unrest, started after Ishaa prayers on August 14, 2005. Street protest began in Malé at 7:30 p.m. near Athamaa Palace - a hotel. This turned to be the most violent of three nights. An angry mob confronted the riot police with petrol-soaked burning tennis balls, bricks, stones and other objects. The unrest was controlled by 1:30 am of August 15, 2005. By the third night some 160 people were arrested and transferred, reportedly, to Feydhoo Finolhu - an uninhabited island of Malé Atoll - and Girifushi (an island used by the military for training purposes).

Both NSS and Police were accused of verbally abusing the crowd, throughout the unrest, which fueled the violence further. On one incident they were accused of storming into a mosque and verbally abusing the people praying. On the other incident it was reported a pregnant women, Aminath Massha, was beaten by NSS personnel. NSS denied these accusations on state owned television, Television Maldives, saying they had not beaten up any pregnant women nor had they stormed into the mosque.

The opposition has criticized the government of provoking the public, and then using it as a means to arrest senior figures within the opposition to suppress the political activities.

== Unrest in other atolls ==
Following Mohamed Nasheed's arrest on August 12, 2005, civil unrest extended beyond Malé to other regions of the Maldives, notably Gaafu Dhaalu Atoll and Addu Atoll. In Gaafu Dhaalu Atoll, protests erupted in Thinadhoo, where demonstrators set fire to the police station, magistrate court, atoll council office, and all police vehicles. Nine policemen were injured during these events and required treatment at the Thinadhoo Regional Hospital. Similarly, on Faresmaathodaa Island within the same atoll, protesters closed down the police station and compelled officers on duty to return home.

In Addu Atoll, significant unrest was reported in Hithadhoo and Gan islands. Protesters torched police stations and the Addu Police Training School, destroying the buildings and all police vehicles. Additionally, detainees held in these facilities were released by the demonstrators.

== See also ==
- 2003 Maldives civil unrest
- Black Friday
