= Visam Ali =

Maldivian politician

- ވިސާމް އަލީ
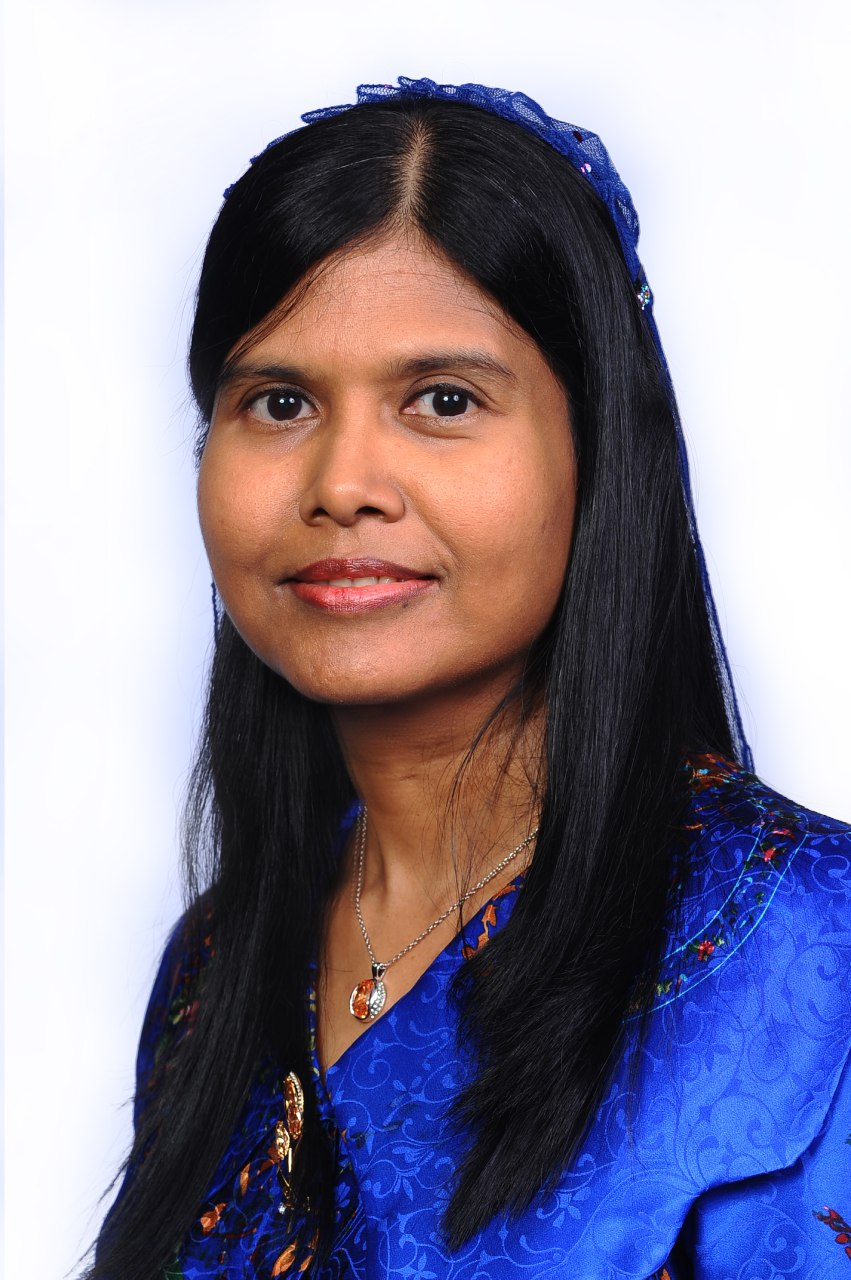
- Portrait, 2019.

High Commissioner of the Maldives to Malaysia
- In office 26 March 2019 – 5 April 2022
- President: Ibrahim Mohamed Solih
- Deputy: Misna Shareef
- Preceded by: Mohamed Fahmy Hassan

Member of the People's Majlis
- In office 28 May 2009 – 28 May 2014
- President: Mohamed Nasheed; Mohamed Waheed Hassan; Abdulla Yameen
- Succeeded by: Mohamed Ameeth Ahmed Manik
- Constituency: Maduvvari

Personal details
- Born: 1974 (age 51–52)
- Party: Maldivian Democratic Party (2013–present)
- Other political affiliations: Dhivehi Rayyithunge Party (until 2013)
- Spouse: Ahmed Thasmeen Ali

Visam Ali (Dhivehi: ވިސާމް އަލީ) is a Maldivian politician and diplomat who served as the High Commissioner of the Maldives to Malaysia from 2019 to 2022. She was a Member of the People's Majlis representing Maduvvari legislative district for the 18th sitting of the People's Majlis.

From 26 March 2019 to 1 February 2020, she was the last Ambassador of the Maldives to Malaysia, when the Maldives returned to its status as a republic in the Commonwealth of Nations, then she became the High Commissioner as a result.

== Career ==
Prior to her political career she was a civil servant and headed the Department of Higher Education and Training, during President Maumoon Abdul Gayoom's administration. With her spouse Ahmed Thasmeen Ali, then Vice Presidential Candidate of DRP, she signed to Maldivian Democratic Party after the defeat in the presidential elections in 2008.

Visam Ali has advocated for children and women's rights, Health care for thalassemia patients, and submitted the Thalassemia control bill to the People's Majlis. She also advocated for the rights of fishermen in her constituency and criticized President Mohamed Nasheed's policy on using police against protestors in Maldives. She is one of the MP's who declined to receive the controversial MVR 20,000 committee allowance for MP's by Peoples Majlis.

She resigned from her position as High Commissioner on 5 April 2022.

Diplomatic posts
Preceded by Mohamed Fahmy Hassan	Ambassador of the Maldives to Malaysia; 2019-2020 Herself as High Commissioner as from 1 February 2020 {{s-aft Misna Shareef (acting)}}
