= Mohamed Fahmy Hassan =

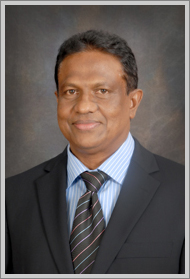
Hassan in 2013

Mohamed Fahmy Hassan is the former chairman of the Maldives Civil Service Commission. He is a native of Fuvahmulah, Maldives, and is a master's degree graduate from the University of Bath, England.

Fahmy started his career in 1975 in the broadcasting industry and since then has worked in offices like the President's Office, Ministry of Health and various schools and offices of the Ministry of Education. Fahmy has taught in or managed a total of 11 educational institutes in the country and has also authored several school textbooks and scripts for educational television and radio programs. He was also instrumental in coordinating and managing the work required to establish four different schools across the Maldives.

He was the high commissioner of the Maldives to Malaysia from 2015 to 2016, when the Maldives withdrew from the Commonwealth, then he was the ambassador of the Maldives to Malaysia from 2016 to 2019.

Diplomatic posts
Preceded by Himself as High Commissioner	Ambassador of the Maldives to Malaysia; 2016-2019	Succeeded by Visam Ali
