= Dhuleh Nukuraanan =

Protests in the Maldives (2025)

- Part of the Gen-Z protests in Asia and the 2025 Maldivian protests
- Date: 24 April 2025 – 3 May 2025 (1 week and 2 days)
- Location: Maldives
- Caused by: Alleged cover up by Maldives Police Service relating to the fall of Hawwa Yumn Rasheed; Public distrust in the government
- Goals: Full list
- Methods: Internet activism Picketing; Protest marches and demonstrations

Casualties
- Arrested: 2

Dhuleh Nukuraanan (Dhivehi: ދުލެއް ނުކުރާނަން, lit. 'Won't stay silent') were a series of ongoing youth-led demonstrations that began in Malé, Maldives, in April 2025. The protests were sparked by the suspicious fall of a young woman, Hawwa Yumn, from the ninth floor of the Fenetony building in the Henveiru district.

== Background ==
On 18 April, Hawwa Yumn Rasheed, a 21-year old, was found severely injured on a rooftop in a warehouse adjacent to the Fentenoy building where she fell from. Despite her condition, emergency services weren't alerted for three hours which after that she stayed in the intensive care unit of Indira Gandhi Memorial Hospital.

These circumstances sparked concern after it was revealed that the person who last saw Yumn, Raud Ahmed Zilal, had connections to politically high people in the Maldivian government.

== Protest ==
Nightly protests had started on 24 April 2025 at Sergeant Adam Haleel Criminal Investigations Building lasting several hours, even during bad weather conditions. After five consecutive days of protesting on Majeedhee Magu, protesters have staged a digital protest, some on Minecraft, X Space, TikTok Live.

=== Demands ===
Protesters demand the government to do the following:

- Maldives Police Service (MPS) to conduct a transparent investigation
- Arresting and prosecuting everyone involved in the case
- Police to explain the inconsistencies of the video footage that don't match with the incident
- Disclosing all the evidence obtained in the investigation
- Police apologizing to both the general public and the family for lying about the investigation
- Conducting an inquiry into the police investigation
- Resignation of Police Commissioner Ali Shujau, Homeland Minister Ali Ihusaan, Transport Minister Mohamed Ameen
- President Mohamed Muizzu to make a public apology for remarks he made that encourages victim blaming and defending the police.
- Dismissal of Chief Inspector of Police Mohamed Samih.

=== Arrests and pepper spray ===
On 1 May, police had separated and pepper sprayed many protesters. Two organizers of the nightly protests, Aishath Shiman Ahmed and Abdulla Mahzoom Majid were arrested, which was condemned by many. Notables include Mohamed Nasheed, Ibrahim Mohamed Solih, Maldivian Democratic Party (MDP), The Democrats. The Criminal Court remanded Shiman and Mahzoom for three days.

Following this, police banned protests to happen on Majeedhee Magu and threatened to use force on those who do. Rasfannu Beach, Malé Industrial Zone, and Usfasgandu were allowed by police for protesters to protest. MDP and The Democrats has called on people from their party to join the nightly protests.

On 3 July, the Prosecutor General's Office (PGO) decided to file charges against both Mahzoom and Shiman, for assault and obstructing a law enforcement officer respectively. Although the PGO said that they can avoid prosecution if they enter a diversion agreement, which they had declined before. MDP Chairperson Fayyaz Ismail called the charges political and condemned the charges.

== Government response ==
On 26 April 2025, Mohamed Muizzu called on young people to stop the nightly protests and senior government officials contacted organizers to invite them to discuss demands. The organizers in response has said that Muizzu must apologize for his remarks before discussing demands.

Both Ihusaan and Ameen rejected any resignation demands claiming no police negligence in the investigation while the latter claims he was out of the country.

In response to the demands made by protesters, Police Commissioner Ali Shujau resigned from his post.

President Muizzu has also established the Special Presidential Commission of Inquiry into the Incident that Occurred in Malé on 18 April 2025 in response to growing demand. However, Yumn's family didn't endorse the commission lacking trust and confidence in it. The family also sought representation on the commission. The commission was also criticized for originally being all male until two women were later appointed as members.

On 5 May, Samih was removed as the head of the Homicide and Death Investigation Unit and reassigned to another department within the MPS. On 13 May, Ali Ihssaan defended MPS's handling of the investigation and has said that the police acted accordingly to the rules and regulations.

=== Commission's report ===
The Presidential Commission submitted its report to President Muizzu, who ordered to publish the entirety of the report to the public. The report revealed that Daud was dismissed over a false statement provided to the police, Raud's negligence contributed to Yumn's fall, both Ihusaan and Ameen's conduct were inappropriate but didn't interfere in the investigation, police were negligent in collecting evidence and securing the scene. The report concluded with saying that Yumn didn't appear to have been pushed from the Fentenoy, and that the commission didn't find evidence of foul play. Muizzu later instructed the Ministry of Homeland Security and Technology and the Ministry of Health to implement the recommendations that were in the report, although no action was taken against Ihusaan or Ameen.
