= Asian Network for Free Elections =

Thailand-based non-governmental organization

- Abbreviation: ANFREL
- Formation: November 2007; 19 years ago
- Type: NGO
- Headquarters: Bangkok, Thailand
- Coordinates: 13.78982369552845°N 100.57924244540355°E
- Region served: Asia
- Members: 27 member organizations (2021)
- Website: anfrel.org

The Asian Network for Free Elections (ANFREL) is an independent and nonpartisan non-governmental organization working to ensure free and fair elections in Asia, on the basis of universal and equal suffrage. ANFREL is based in Bangkok, Thailand.

The alliance was established in November 1997, and includes 27 member organizations across 17 Asian nations, including Afghanistan, Bangladesh, Cambodia, India, Indonesia, Maldives, Mongolia, Myanmar, Nepal, Pakistan, Philippines, Singapore, South Korea, Sri Lanka, Taiwan, Thailand, and Timor-Leste.

ANFREL is aligned with the principles enshrined in Article 25 of the International Covenant on Civil and Political Rights. ANFREL routinely shares expertise in election monitoring through capacity building programmes and dispatches international election observation missions (EOMs). From its founding in 2007 to 2012, ANFREL carried out 50, averaging 3.5 EOMs per year.
