= Ministry of Transport and Civil Aviation (Maldives) =

Government ministry of the Maldives

Agency overview
- Formed: 17 November 2018
- Jurisdiction: Government of the Maldives
- Headquarters: Umar Zahir Office Building, 3rd Floor, Orchidmaa Hingun, Hulhumalé
- Annual budget: MVR 57.9m (2024)
- Minister responsible: Mohamed Ameen
- Deputy Ministers responsible: Mohamed Awadh Ayaz, Deputy Minister of Transport and Civil Aviation; Ibrahim Yasir, Deputy Minister of Transport and Civil Aviation; Mohamed Aflah, Deputy Minister of Transport and Civil Aviation; Ali Nishan, Deputy Minister of Transport and Civil Aviation; Ali Mohamed, Deputy Minister of Transport and Civil Aviation; Ibrahim Ilham, Deputy Minister of Transport and Civil Aviation
- Agency executives: Ibrahim Shiyam, Minister of State for Transport and Civil Aviation; Abdul Latheef Mohamed, Minister of State for Transport and Civil Aviation
- Website: transport.gov.mv

The Ministry of Transport and Civil Aviation (Dhivehi: ދަތުރުފަތުރާއި މަދަނީ އުދުހުންތަކާ ބެހޭ ވުޒާރާ) is a Maldivian government ministry that regulates all land, sea, and air transportations in the Maldives.

The ministry was established on 17 November 2018 during the presidency of Ibrahim Mohamed Solih.

It is headquartered in Hulhumalé.

== Ministers ==
No.	Portrait	Name (born-died)	Term			Political party	Government	Ref.
No.	Portrait	Name (born-died)	Took office	Left office	Time in office	Political party	Government	Ref.
1	Aishath Nahula	Aishath Nahula (born 1982)	17 November 2018	17 November 2023	5 years, 0 days	JP	Solih	
2	Mohamed Ameen	Mohamed Ameen	17 November 2023	Incumbent	2 years, 158 days	PPM	Muizzu	
