= Kendhoo =

Inhabited island in Baa Atoll, Maldives

Kendhoo ކެންދޫ
- Inhabited island

- Location in Maldives
- Coordinates: 05°16′34″N 73°00′40″E
- Country: Maldives
- Geographic atoll: Maalhosmadulu Dhekunuburi
- Administrative atoll: Baa Atoll
- Distance to Malé: 133.67 km (83.06 mi)

Area
  - Total: 0.145 km^{2} (0.056 sq mi)

Dimensions
  - Length: 0.600 km (0.373 mi)
  - Width: 0.350 km (0.217 mi)

Population (2022)
  - Total: 1,002
  - Density: 6,910/km^{2} (17,900/sq mi)
- Time zone: UTC+05:00 (MST)

Kendhoo (Dhivehi: ކެންދޫ) is one of the inhabited islands of Baa Atoll, Maldives. It is located in the northern part of the Baa Atoll.

Magaam

== Geography ==
The island is 133.67 km (83 mi; 72 nmi) northwest of the country's capital, Malé.

== Demography ==
It is the most populated island in the Kendhoo constituency.

Historical population
Year	Pop.	±%
2006	858	—
2014	1,023	+19.2%
2022	1,002	−2.1%
2006-2022: Census populations Source:

== Economy ==
The primary livelihoods and income-generating activities of the people of Kendhoo have historically been thatch-making and fishing. A large number of youth on the island work in resorts. Additionally, there are people who work in the retail and construction industries, which have seen a booming recently.

=== Services ===
Kendhoo has electricity for 24 hours, generated from a powerhouse with three generators. Several years ago, an expansion project of the electricity service on the island was completed by installing a new generator set and replacing the panel board and the entire cable network installed on the island. The project was funded with MVR1 million in loan assistance from the Asian Development Bank.

Recently, the government started a new project on the island to relocate the powerhouse and build a new administration block. This will further enhance power generation capacity and improve efficiency.

The main issue facing the island is the lack of a sewerage system. The residents of the island have raised this issue with the concerned authorities on several occasions. A project is now underway to install a sewer and water network on the island. The completion of the project will solve the age-old problem of using sewage water for bathing and household use and ensure a continuous supply of clean drinking water.

== Education ==
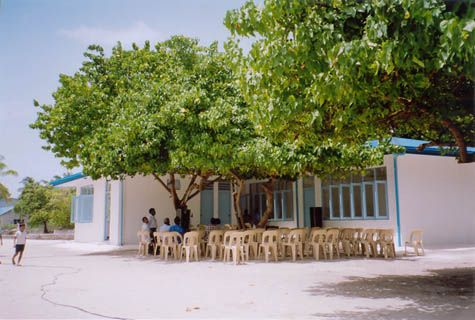
Kendhoo School

The island has a higher secondary school that teaches up to grade 10. In the school, most of the teachers are local. In addition, the island has a preschool that is run by a private party. There are two centres on the island that teach Quran to the children of the island. The island also has a higher education institute that offers MNQA-approved courses in Quranic teachings.

== Healthcare ==
Kendhoo Health Centre

There is a health centre on the island that is open sixteen hours a day. Currently, the centre has an expatriate doctor for general consultations. The Health centre also provides laboratory services for general investigations. There are two pharmacies on the island, of which one is run by the STO (State Trading Organisation) and the other by a private party. In addition, Kendhoo is well known for its traditional herbal medicine; people from all across the country and even from other countries visit for treatments.

== Transport ==
=== Harbour ===
The island has a harbour of 165 by 55 metres (541 by 180 feet), which was reconstructed by the government in 2017. The old harbour was vastly damaged due to the 2014 tsunami disaster. The reconstructed harbour has a 145-metre breakwater, a 42-metre sand-cement bag quay wall, a newly dredged area at 3 metres (9.8 feet) from mean sea level, a 72-metre (236 ft) rock boulder revetment, and an 87-metre (285 ft) sand-cement bag revetment. It also includes an 181-meter-long (594-foot) 5-meter-wide (16-foot) pavement next to the quay wall and a 262-meter-long (860-foot) concrete block quay wall. The project also installed navigation lights and harbour lights for the new harbour. The project cost a total of MVR 29,294,992.10, which was funded from the domestic PSIP budget.
