= Mohamad Zaki =

Maldivian businessman and politician (born 1952)

Dato' Mohamad Zaki
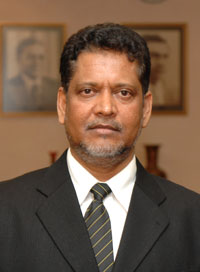
- Portrait, 2009

Chairman of Maldives Ports Limited
- In office 17 February 2019 – 30 November 2020
- President: Ibrahim Mohamed Solih
- Preceded by: Ibrahim Abdulla

High Commissioner of the Maldives to Malaysia
- In office 2009 – 11 November 2013
- President: Mohamed Nasheed; Mohamed Waheed Hassan
- Preceded by: Midhath Hilmy
- Succeeded by: Mohamed Fayaz

Personal details
- Born: 20 February 1952 (age 74) Maafannu, Malé, Maldive Islands
- Other political affiliations: Progressive Party of Maldives (2021–2025); Adhaalath Party (until 2021); Gaumee Itthihaad (2012–2013); Maldivian Democratic Party (until 2012)
- Spouse: Nazima Asir
- Children: Muad Mohamed Zaki
- Nickname(s): Nazaki Zaki, Sandhaanu Zaki

Dato' Mohamad Zaki (born 20 February 1952), also known as Nazaki Zaki or Sandhaanu Zaki, is a businessman and politician in the Maldives. Zaki previously served as the chairman of the Maldives Ports Limited from 2019 to 2020, as well as the high commissioner of the Maldives to Malaysia and the non-resident ambassador of the Maldives to Thailand, and Indonesia, and High Commissioner to Brunei.

== Career ==
Zaki founded Nazaki Services Pvt Ltd during his self-exile in Malaysia due to political turmoil in the Maldives, later bringing his company to the Maldives. Zaki was also a member of the Maldivian Democratic Party (MDP), and also part of the opposition political magazine Sandhaanu.

In July 2002, Zaki was sentenced to life for being part of the Sandhaanu magazine. Zaki's official charges were "trying to overthrow the government by calling on the people to come forward and fight" and "causing hatred in the people’s minds towards the government by forming a newsletter called Sandhaanu". He was later named a prisoner of conscience by Amnesty International and was released in 2005 after international pressure on the Maumoon Abdul Gayoom administration.

In 2009, President Mohamed Nasheed appointed Zaki as the High Commissioner of the Maldives to Malaysia and later appointed him as the non-resident ambassador to Thailand, Indonesia, and High Commissioner to Brunei.

In 2011, Zaki was conferred the title Dato' by Malaysian King Sultan Abdul Halim. He was the first Maldivian to be conferred that title. In November 2011, he resigned as the High Commissioner to Malaysia.

In 2012, he left the MDP in 2012 and joined the Gaumee Itthihaad (GIP) and later became the vice president of the party.

During some time later he joined the Adhaalath Party (AP).

In 2019, Zaki was appointed as the Chairman of the Maldives Ports Limited. Zaki later resigned the following year citing corruption.

In 2021, Zaki left the AP and joined the Progressive Party of Maldives (PPM) and later became the PPM-PNC coalition's representative to Malaysia and Brunei.

== Personal life ==
Zaki is married to Nazima Asir and is the father of Muad Mohamed Zaki.
