= Mizna Shareef =

Maldivian diplomat and politician

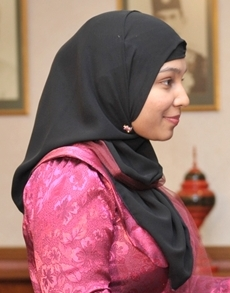
- Mizna Shareef in 2012

Deputy High Commissioner of the Republic of Maldives to Malaysia
- Incumbent
- Assumed office 7 May 2024

Minister of State for Tourism, Arts and Culture
- In office 7 March 2012 – 19 June 2013

Personal details
- Occupation: diplomat, politician

Mariyam Mizna Shareef is a Maldivian diplomat and politician.

== Early life ==
Her father Ibrahim Shareef was a member of parliament.

== Career ==
Shareef was appointed Minister of State for Tourism, Arts and Culture in 2012. She resigned in 2013.
