= Maldives Ports Limited =

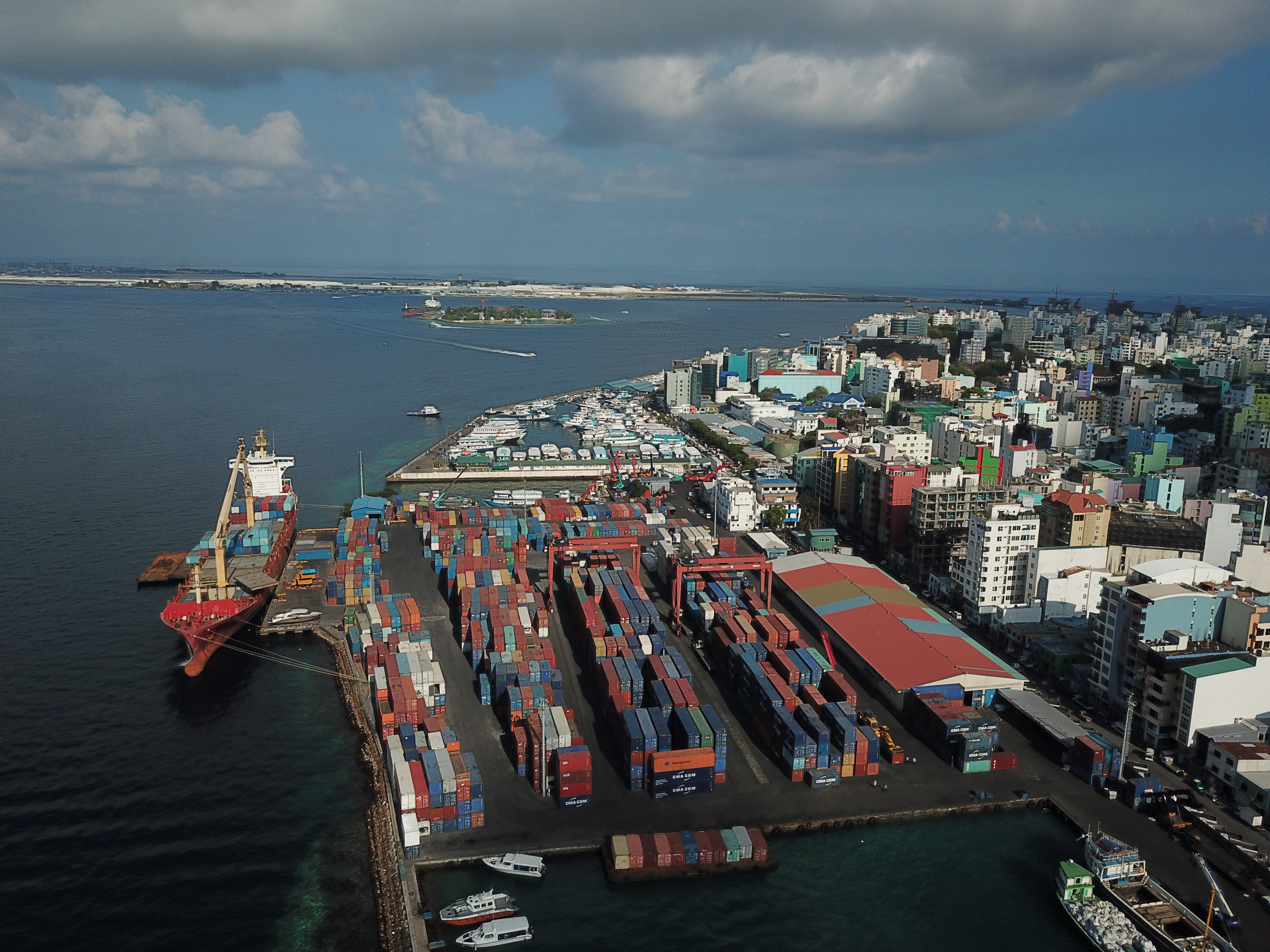
- Port of Malé
- Company type: State Enterprise
- Industry: Transport
- Founded: Malé, Maldives (1986)
- Headquarters: Malé, Maldives
- Key people: Shaahid Ali (chief executive officer)
- Services: Port services
- Website: port.mv

Maldives Ports Limited is a state corporation of the Maldives, created to be the sole port authority of the ports of the Maldives. It is 100% owned by the government of Maldives and is located in Malé, the principal port, major city and capital of the archipelago nation in the Indian Ocean.

The Port of Malé comprises an Inner Harbour, used by pleasure craft, the fishing industry and coastal trade; and an Outer Harbor where larger ships may port.

MPL is planning to relocate the port to either the island of Thilafushi or Gulhifalhu. The completion of the new port will take about 2 to 3 years, including all the land reclamation process. The new port will have a capacity of around 220 thousand containers, enabling turning vessels around in one to two days. The estimated cost for a port like this amounts to US$250 million. UTF stands as India's most substantial grant-in-aid initiative in the Maldives. Under this project, India will take charge of developing and maintaining the harbour, while also offering professional, technical, and logistical assistance for 15 years once the project is completed. This critical support empowers the Maldives National Defense Force (MNDF) to dock, maintain, and repair its coast guard vessels independently. Prior to this, the MNDF had to seek assistance from other countries for vessel repairs.

== History ==
Prior to 2012, port activity at Malé consisted of portage of goods from anchored ships and manual unloading and warehousing. The Maldivian National Trading Corporation (MNTC), which was formed in the 1950s, and Orchid Company, which was formed a few years later, began using mechanised equipment at the port, including barges, tugboats and cranes. Port operations were assumed by the government after the two companies were dissolved, and in 1983, Maldives Transport and Contracting Company was formed as a state corporation owned by the state and the public. 1985 saw the Male' Commercial Harbour Project, which rebuilt and modernised the port, dredging and reshaping the harbour and constructing new jetties, office buildings and container terminals. The current port operator and authority, Maldives Ports Limited, was formed shortly after in 1986.

== Port facilities ==
Berths · Magathufaalan: length 101.3m, Water Depth of DL-10.8m, Vessels with 6000 GT

· Eastern Lighterage Berth: Length 85.0 m, Water Depth DL-3.5m

· Western Lighterage Berth: Length 150.0m, Water Depth DL-3.5m

Storage Area

· Open Storage of 21,700 m^{2}

· Covered Warehouse of 2400 m^{2}

Reefer Points

· 84 plug Points for reefer containers

Pilotage Pilotage is compulsory for all vessels above 100 GT engaged in foreign trade. The position of the pilot boarding is defined as follows latitude of 04 °10.9N and longitude of 073 °30.4E.

== Services ==
MPL is engaged in the administration and management of Male' Commercial Harbour and providing the following services.

Marine Services

1. Pilotage – Providing of Pilot service

2. Dockage – Providing of Berths

3. Towage – Providing of Tug Services

4. Salvage – Rescue operation

Cargo Services

1. Stevedoring – Handling of cargo from ship to jetty or vice versa

2. Handling – Handling of cargo from jetty to storage place

3. Wharfage – Providing of Wharves and equipments

4. Storage – Providing of warehouses

5. Shifting – Shifting of cargo within the ship, jetty and re-load

6. Sorting – Sorting of mixed marks

7. Measuring – Measurement of cargo

8. Stuffing – Stuffing goods into container

9. Stripping – Removing goods out of container

10. Lashing – Lashing the container

11. Unlashing – Unlashing the container

Other Services

1. Rental -Renting Tugs, Barges, Cranes, Forklifts and Equipment

2. Water -Providing Water to Ships

3. Electricity -Providing Power to reefer container

== See also ==
- Atolls of the Maldives
- Harbor
- Government of the Maldives
- Port authority
- Port operator
- Transport in the Maldives
