= Gihane Zaki =

Egyptian Egyptologist (born 1966)

Gihane Zaki (born 1966 in Cairo) is an Egyptian Egyptologist. Until 1993 she studied at the Helwan University (Egypt) and from 1995 to 2000 as a doctoral student at Lumière University Lyon 2 in France. She was representing the Egyptian government at the UNESCO Convention Concerning the Protection of the World Cultural and Natural Heritage and was the director of the Egyptian Academy of Fine Arts in Rome from 2013 to 2019. Gihane Zaki is the author of several research publications. In 2021 she was appointed member of the House of Representatives of Egypt by the Egyptian President Abdel Fattah el-Sisi. In May 2024 she was appointed head of the Grand Egyptian Museum.

She was appointed Knight of the Ordre national du Mérite in 2009. 2025 she received the Legion of Honour award (Légion d’Honneur). In February 2026 she was appointed to the position of the Culture Minister of Egypt. She resigned in July 2026.

== Works ==
- Le premier nome de Haute-Égypte du IIIe siècle avant J.-C. au VIIe siècle après J.-C. d'après les sources hiéroglyphiques des temples ptolémaïques et romains. Monographies Reine Élisabeth 13. Turnhout: Brepols, 2009, ISBN 9782503527246.
