= High Commission of the Maldives, Kuala Lumpur =

Diplomatic mission of the Maldives in Kuala Lumpur, Malaysia

High Commission of the Maldives, Kuala Lumpur މެލޭޝިއާގައި ހުންނަ ދިވެހިރާއްޖޭގެ ހައިކޮމިޝަން Suruhanjaya Tinggi Maldives di Malaysia
- Location: Kuala Lumpur, Malaysia
- Address: Unit E-12B-01, Level 12B, Icon Tower (East), No. 1, Jalan 1/68F, Jalan Tun Razak, 55000 Kuala Lumpur
- Opened: 2006
- High Commissioner: Mariyam Shabeena Ahmed
- Website: maldives.org.my

The High Commission of the Maldives in Malaysia (Dhivehi: މެލޭޝިއާގައި ހުންނަ ދިވެހިރާއްޖޭގެ ހައިކޮމިޝަން, Malay: Suruhanjaya Tinggi Maldives di Malaysia) is an overseas diplomatic mission of the Maldives located in Kuala Lumpur, the capital of Malaysia.

== History ==
After diplomatic relations were established between the two countries in 1968, a High Commission office was opened in Kuala Lumpur in 2006.

It was previously known as the Embassy of the Maldives in Malaysia (Dhivehi: މެލޭޝިއާގައި ހުންނަ ދިވެހިރާއްޖޭގެ އެމްބަސީ, Malay: Kedutaan Besar Maldives di Malaysia / Kedutaan Maldives di Malaysia) from October 2016, when the Maldives left the Commonwealth, until February 2020.

On 1 February 2020, when the Maldives returned to its status as a Commonwealth republic, the mission reverted to the Office of the High Commission of the Maldives.

== Address ==
Unit E-12B-01, Level 12B, Icon Tower (East), No. 1, Jalan 1/68F, Jalan Tun Razak, 55000 Kuala Lumpur.

== Ambassador・High Commissioner ==
The current High Commissioner is Mariyam Shabeena Ahmed, who was appointed on 7 May 2024.

== See also ==
- Malaysia–Maldives relations
