= List of ambassadors of France to Malaysia =

Ambassador of France to Malaysia
- Ambassadeur de France en Malaisie
- Arms of the French Republic
- Incumbent; Axel Cruau since February 21, 2023
- Style: His Excellency
- Seat: Kuala Lumpur, Malaysia
- Nominator: The minister of Europe and foreign affairs
- Appointer: The president of France with Council of Ministers meeting
- Term length: 3-4 years
- Inaugural holder: Dircks-Dilly
- Formation: 1957
- Website: Embassy of France, Kuala Lumpur

The ambassador of France to Malaysia is the head of France's diplomatic mission to Malaysia, and the official representative of the government of France to the government of Malaysia. The position has the rank and status of an ambassador extraordinary and plenipotentiary and is based in the Embassy of France, Kuala Lumpur.

Axel Cruau was appointed ambassador in January 2023.

== History ==
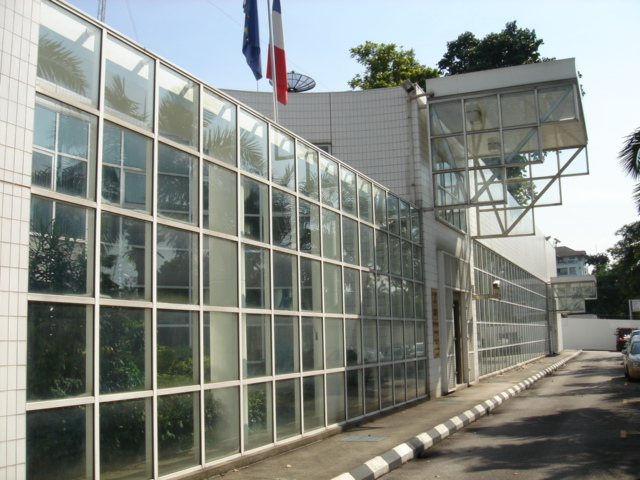
French Embassy, Kuala Lumpur

France was one of 15 countries to establish formal diplomatic relations with the Federation of Malaya in 1957 soon after its independence.

== List of heads of mission ==
=== Ambassadors of the Fourth Republic to Malaya ===
Designated/Diplomatic accreditation	Ambassador	President of France	Prime Minister of Malaya	Term end
August 31, 1957	Dircks-Dilly	René Coty	Tunku Abdul Rahman	February 13, 1958
February 14, 1958	Brière	René Coty (1958-1959)	Tunku Abdul Rahman	July 14, 1960
February 14, 1958	Brière	Charles de Gaulle (1959-1960)	Tunku Abdul Rahman	July 14, 1960

=== Ambassadors of the Fifth Republic to Malaya ===
Designated/Diplomatic accreditation	Ambassador	President of France	Prime Minister of Malaya	Term end
July 15, 1960	Queuille	Charles de Gaulle	Tunku Abdul Rahman	August 31, 1962
September 1, 1962	Anthonioz	Charles de Gaulle	Tunku Abdul Rahman	May 10, 1968

=== Ambassadors of the Fifth Republic to Malaysia ===
Designated/Diplomatic accreditation	Ambassador	President of France	Prime Minister of Malaysia	Term end
September 1, 1962	Anthonioz	Charles de Gaulle	Tunku Abdul Rahman	May 10, 1968
May 11, 1968	Epinat	Charles de Gaulle (1968-1969)	Tunku Abdul Rahman (1968-1970)	January 31, 1971
May 11, 1968	Epinat	Georges Pompidou (1969-1971)	Tunku Abdul Rahman (1968-1970)	January 31, 1971
May 11, 1968	Epinat	Georges Pompidou (1969-1971)	Abdul Razak Hussein (1970-1971)	January 31, 1971
February 1, 1971	Simon de Quirielle	Georges Pompidou (1971-1974)	Abdul Razak Hussein (1971-1976)	July 18, 1976
February 1, 1971	Simon de Quirielle	Valéry Giscard d'Estaing (1974-1976)	Abdul Razak Hussein (1971-1976)	July 18, 1976
February 1, 1971	Simon de Quirielle	Valéry Giscard d'Estaing (1974-1976)	Hussein Onn (1976)	July 18, 1976
July 19, 1976	Bolle	Valéry Giscard d'Estaing	Hussein Onn	May 23, 1978
May 24, 1978	Stéphane Travert	Valéry Giscard d'Estaing (1978-1981)	Hussein Onn (1978-1981)	January 4, 1982
May 24, 1978	Stéphane Travert	François Mitterrand (1981-1982)	Mahathir Mohamad (1981-1982)	January 4, 1982
January 5, 1982	Mlle De Corbie	François Mitterrand	Mahathir Mohamad	June 6, 1985
June 7, 1985	Jean Perrin	François Mitterrand	Mahathir Mohamad	June 25, 1989
June 26, 1989	Frédéric Grasset	François Mitterrand	Mahathir Mohamad	May 24, 1993
May 25, 1993	Thierry Reynard	François Mitterrand	Mahathir Mohamad	April 27, 1995
April 28, 1995	Edouard Braine	François Mitterrand (1995)	Mahathir Mohamad	July 27, 1998
April 28, 1995	Edouard Braine	Jacques Chirac (1995-1998)	Mahathir Mohamad	July 27, 1998
July 28, 1998	Xavier Driencourt	Jacques Chirac	Mahathir Mohamad	October 6, 2002
October 7, 2002	Jacques Lapouge	Jacques Chirac	Mahathir Mohamad (2002-2003)	October 4, 2005
October 7, 2002	Jacques Lapouge	Jacques Chirac	Abdullah Ahmad Badawi (2003-2005)	October 4, 2005
October 5, 2005	Alain du Boispéan	Jacques Chirac (2005-2007)	Abdullah Ahmad Badawi	September 1, 2008
October 5, 2005	Alain du Boispéan	Nicolas Sarkozy (2007-2008)	Abdullah Ahmad Badawi	September 1, 2008
September 2, 2008	Marc Baréty	Nicolas Sarkozy	Abdullah Ahmad Badawi (2008-2009)	November 10, 2011
September 2, 2008	Marc Baréty	Nicolas Sarkozy	Mohammad Najib Abdul Razak (2009-2011)	November 10, 2011
November 11, 2011	Martine Dorance	Nicolas Sarkozy (2011-2012)	Mohammad Najib Abdul Razak	September 29, 2014
November 11, 2011	Martine Dorance	François Hollande (2012-2014)	Mohammad Najib Abdul Razak	September 29, 2014
September 30, 2014	Christophe Penot	François Hollande (2014-2017)	Mohammad Najib Abdul Razak	August 16, 2017
September 30, 2014	Christophe Penot	Emmanuel Macron (2017)	Mohammad Najib Abdul Razak	August 16, 2017
August 17, 2017	Frédéric Laplanche	Emmanuel Macron	Mohammad Najib Abdul Razak (2017-2018)	September 12, 2020
August 17, 2017	Frédéric Laplanche	Emmanuel Macron	Mahathir Mohamad (2018-2020)	September 12, 2020
August 17, 2017	Frédéric Laplanche	Emmanuel Macron	Muhyiddin Yassin (2020-2021)	September 12, 2020
December 9, 2020	Roland Galharague	Emmanuel Macron	Muhyiddin Yassin (2020-2021)	January 19, 2023

== See also ==
- France-Malaysia relations
