= Zeki =

Zeki is a Turkish masculine given name and may refer to:

- Zeki Akar (born 1944), Turkish judge
- Zeki Alasya (1943–2015), Turkish actor
- Zeki Demir (born 1982), Turkish karateka
- Zeki Demirkubuz (born 1964), Turkish film director
- Zeki Ergezen (1949–2020), Turkish architect and politician
- Zeki Gülay (born 1972), Turkish basketball player
- Zeki Kuneralp (1914–1998), Turkish diplomat
- Zeki Müren (1931–1996), Turkish singer
- Zeki Ökten (1941–2009), Turkish film director
- Zeki Önder Özen (born 1969), Turkish footballer
- Zeki Pasha (1862–1943), Ottoman Turkish field marshal
- Zeki Sezer, Turkish politician
- Zeki Rıza Sporel (1898–1969), Turkish footballer
- Zeki Üngör (1880–1958), Turkish composer
- Zeki Velidi Togan (1890–1970), Turkologist and historian of Bashkir origin
- Zeki Yavru (born 1991), Turkish footballer

As a surname:

- Semir Zeki (born 1940), British and French neuroscientist

As a nickname:

- Salih Zeki, mathematician

== See also ==
- Zaki
