= Ricardo Allicock =

Jamaican diplomat

Clement Philip Ricardo Allicock is a Jamaican career diplomat who served as Jamaican envoy to Japan, Australia, India, Indonesia, Korea, Malaysia, New Zealand and the Philippines.

== Career ==
Allicock began his diplomatic career with the Jamaican Ministry of Foreign Affairs and Foreign Trade in 2001. In 2002, he was appointed as Consul General to the Southern United States, based in Miami.

Between 2008 and 2012, he was assigned to the Ministry of Foreign Affairs and Foreign Trade of Jamaica as Chief of Protocol, after which he was appointed Director of Bilateral Relations.

In 2013, he was assigned to Tokyo as Ambassador to Japan, with concurrent ambassadorial appointments to Indonesia, Korea and the Philippines.

He was appointed High Commissioner of Jamaica to India upon presentation of his Letter of Credence to Indian president Shri Pranab Mukherjee at Rashtrapati Bhavan on 21 October 2014 and also has concurrent non-resident postings as Ambassador to the Philippines, Korea and Indonesia, while also serving as non-resident High Commissioner to Malaysia, New Zealand and Australia until 2020. In 2021, Allicock was appointed Director of Diplomatic Protocol at the Ministry of Foreign Affairs and Foreign Trade of Jamaica.

Ambassador Allicock returned to the Ministry of Foreign Affairs from Japan in 2020 and in 2021 was appointed Director of Diplomatic Protocol.

On April 8, 2025, Japanese Ambassador, Yasuhiro Atsumi, conferred the decoration of The Order of the Rising Sun, Gold and Silver Star upon Allicock, in recognition of his "outstanding contribution in promoting the bilateral relationship and mutual understanding between Japan and Jamaica."

== Honours ==
- Order of the Rising Sun, 2nd Class, Gold and Silver Star (2025)
