= Ahmad Zaki =

Ahmad or Ahmed Zaki (Arabic: أحمد زكي) may refer to:

- Ahmad Zaki Pasha (1867–1934), Egyptian philologist
- Ahmed Zaki Yamani (1930–2021), former Saudi Arabian oil minister
- Ahmed Zaki (politician) (1931–1996), former Prime Minister of the Republic of Maldives
- Ahmad Zaki (footballer) (born 1999), Egyptian footballer
- Ahmed Zaki (actor) (1949–2005), Egyptian actor
- Ahmad Zakii Anwar (born 1955), Malaysian artist

== See also ==
- Mohammad Ahmed Zaki, Indian Army General
