= Ibrahim Ismail (politician) =

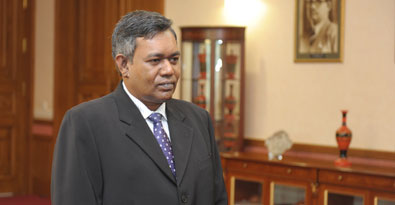
Ibra in 2010

Ibrahim Ismail, popularly known as ‘Ibra’, is a Maldivian politician and former member of the People’s Majlis and the Special Majlis. Prior to his career in politics, he was also an administrator in the education sector.

He has been appointed as the Advisor to the President of the Maldives Mohamed Nasheed.

== Education ==
Ibra completed his secondary education at Majeediyya School and in the Science Education Centre in Malé before attending the University of Canberra in Australia where he completed his bachelor's degree. He then went on to read for his master's degree in Education Administration at the University of Canberra for which Ibra received a commendation for his thesis.

While he was a postgraduate student in Canberra, Ibra presented a research paper at the Annual Conference of the Australian Council for Education Administration in which he presented a new theory on educational systems in small island states.

== Government Service ==
After completing his post-graduate studies, Ibra returned to Malé and started his career at the Ministry of Education as a Research Analyst.

Ibra’s first personal experience of the real lack of political freedom in the Maldives came about in 1996, at a meeting of government officials, when he stated that the Treasury should reduce the state budget for the Presidential Palace. Ibra was placed under arrest for 45 days. He was then transferred to the Department of Public Examinations as an Assistant Director.

== Political career ==
Ibra first came to public attention in 2004 during his campaign for a seat in the Special Majlis, the legislative assembly tasked with drafting the new constitution. In a letter he wrote to President Gayoom on 20 April 2004, well before the publication of the Government’s Reform Agenda on 9 June 2004, Ibra called for constitutional amendments and the introduction of a checks and balance system, to reduce the term of office for the President, to strengthen human rights, to strengthen accountability and transparency within the government and to put special emphasis on the separation of powers so that the Judiciary, the Executive and the Legislature may function independently in line with that of any other democratic society.

== Private Work ==
In parallel to his public career, Ibra ran a consultancy firm.

He started a training center to provide vocational skills in commercial service-based sectors.

== Election to Public Office ==
In 2004, Ibra was elected to the Special Majlis for the Malé constituency.

On 12 August 2004, the public gathered in the Republican Square in front of the Headquarters of the National Security Service to protest at the treatment by the Police of political activists. Ibra addressed the gathering. Security services arrested many members of the crowd. Ibra was arrested along with other reformists that day and spent 68 days in solitary confinement in Dhoonidhoo Prison, and numerous days under house arrest.

Whilst under house arrest, Ibra contested one of the two seats allocated to the Male’ constituency in the People’s Majlis (Parliament) and won.

== Ibra & MDP ==
The Maldivian Democratic Party (MDP) was the first political party to be instigated in the Maldives in recent history and Ibra played a huge role in its foundation. He was one of the first 42 people to put their signatures to register the party and also functioned as a councilor for the party in Male’ long before political parties were legalized in 2005. Ibra was elected to the post of Party President during its first Extra-Ordinary Congress, but later resigned as Party President in November 2006.

== Member of the People’s Majlis ==
Since his election to the People’s Majlis, Ibra has introduced several bills:

- Bill on Freedom of Assembly
- Amendment on Article 81/68 (Bill on judicial access to private parties)
- Amendment on Article 6/94 (Bill on religious unity)
- Amendment on Article 1/81
- Amendment on Article 1/66
- Amendment on Article 1/81
- Amendment on Article 21/81
- Bill on Independence of Media

Listed below are some proposals made by Ibra to the People’s Majlis

- Inception of a Parliamentary Committee to look into the problems related to narcotics.
- The refusal of the government to grant registration to non-governmental organisation.
- The present status of the healthcare system.
- The proposal to ease access to accommodation in Male’, for residents living in Male’.
- Minimum wage for employment.
- The need for approval by Majlis, all bylaws and regulations conferred to the people by various agencies of state.
- Pension for employees
- Treatment of prisoners by the authorities.
- Improvement in utility services.
- Improvement in corrections services.
- Reduction in protectionist measures and the elimination of import tariffs.
- Article 5/2007 of the Civil Service Bill.

== Member of Special Majlis ==
Ibra is a member of the Drafting Committee for the Special Majlis tasked with completing the new constitution. He ran in the first multi-party parliamentary election recently hold on 9 May 2009. He was not elected by competing the chairperson of Maldives Democratic Party (MDP). However, he has been working as a prominent leader of the parliament.
