= Mohamed Ameen (minister) =

Maldivian government official

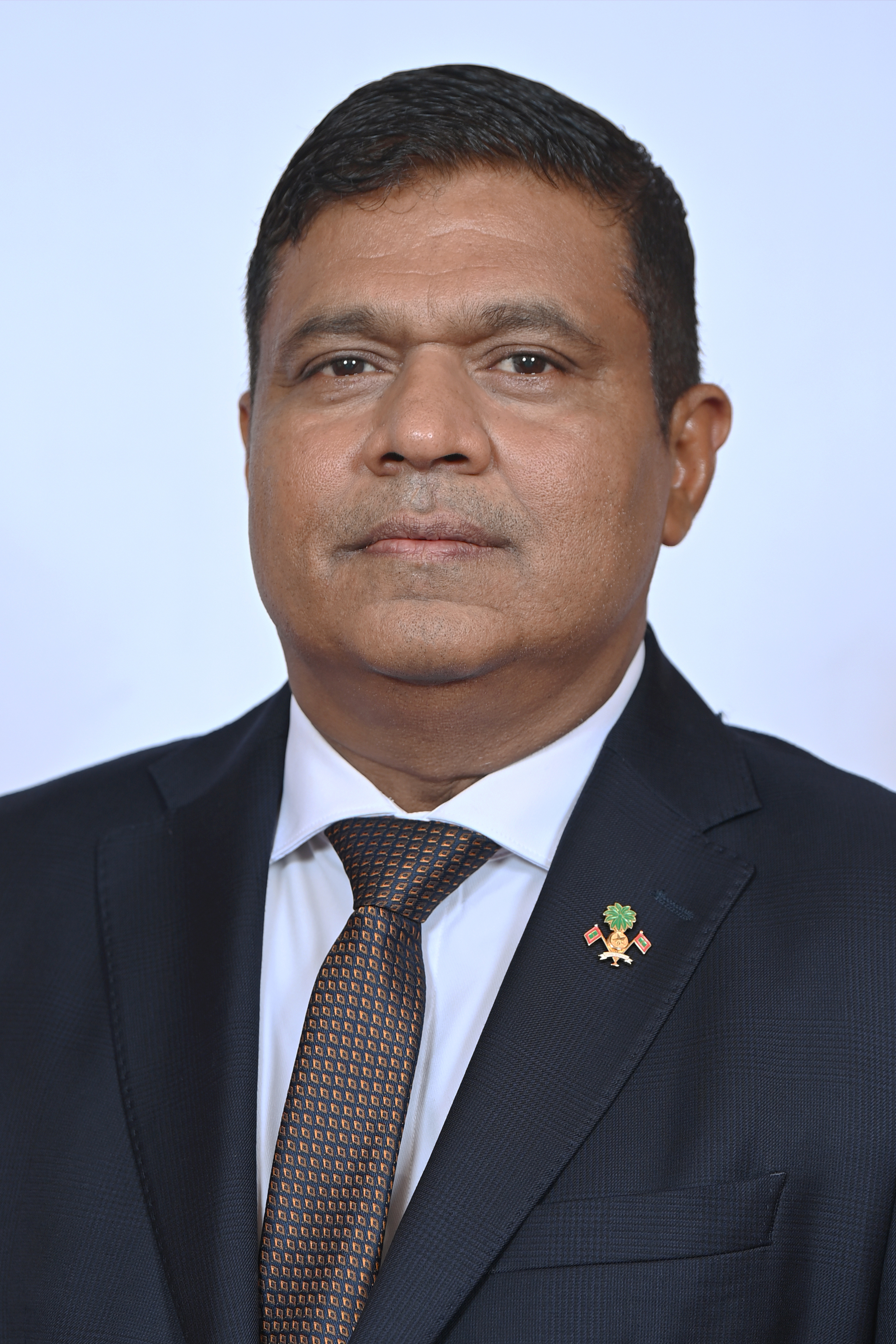
- Official portrait, 2023

Minister of Tourism and Civil Aviation
- Incumbent
- Assumed office 14 April 2026
- President: Mohamed Muizzu
- Preceded by: Thoriq Ibrahim

Minister of Transport and Civil Aviation
- In office 17 November 2023 – 14 April 2026
- President: Mohamed Muizzu
- Preceded by: Aishath Nahula
- Succeeded by: Himself as Minister of Tourism and Civil Aviation

Personal details
- Born: Machchangolhi, Malé, Maldives
- Party: People's National Congress
- Other political affiliations: Progressive Party of Maldives

Mohamed Ameen is a Maldivian politician who has been serving as the Ministry of Tourism and Civil Aviation since 2026.

== Career ==
Ameen previously served as Operations Director at Island Aviation Services (Operator of VIA) but was unlawfully terminated in 2019, but won an unlawful termination lawsuit in the Civil Court. He also served as Campaign Managers of Abdulla Yameen and Mohamed Muizzu.

In November 2023, Ameen was appointed as the Minister of Transport and Civil Aviation by President Mohamed Muizzu.

In April 2026, Ameen was appointed by President Muizzu as the Minister of Tourism and Civil Aviation.
