= Sandhaanu =

Defunct political news websites in the Maldives

Sandhaanu (meaning Throne in English) was an online political news magazine in the Maldives. It was launched in 1999.

Its main editor Ahmed Didi together with his main contributors Ibrahim Luthfee and Mohamed Zaki were sentenced to life in prison while another editor, Fathimath Nisreen, to ten years in prison in 2003 for their criticism of President Maumoon Abdul Gayoom and his government. One of their contributors (Ibrahim Luthfee) managed to escape from prison and went under the protection of the Swiss government. The others remained in prison and suffered torture and isolation constantly before being released due to the threat of economic sanctions by the European Union against the Maldivian Government. Hence, as a show of cooperation to the EU, the Maldives Government released the remaining editors one by one erasing all criminal charges brought against them.

At the end of 2006, they started an online version of their news magazine which has gained popularity among Maldivians living abroad. By 2007, they had started the production of their own weekly magazine which was mostly is seen as a magazine opposed to Gayoom's Government. When Gayoom was ousted from power Sandhaanu became a pro-government magazine focusing on various areas of concern in the country. However, it was closed in 2008.
