= Maduvvari (Raa Atoll) =

Maduvvari މަޑުއްވަރި
- Inhabited island
- Location in Maldives
- Coordinates: 05°29′05″N 72°53′56″E
- Country: Maldives
- Geographic atoll: Maalhosmadulu Uthuruburi
- Administrative atoll: Raa Atoll
- Distance to Malé: 159.83 km (99.31 mi)

Government
  - Type: Mayor–council government
  - Body: R. Maduvvaree Council
  - President: Mohamed Sodiq

Dimensions
  - Length: 0.650 km (0.404 mi)
  - Width: 0.325 km (0.202 mi)

Population (2022)
  - Total: 1,760 (including foreigners)
- Time zone: UTC+05:00 (MST)

Maduvvari (Dhivehi: މަޑުއްވަރި) is one of the inhabited islands of Raa Atoll.

== Geography ==
The island is 159.83 km (99 mi; 86 nmi) northwest of the country's capital, Malé.

== Demography ==
Historical population
Year	Pop.	±%
2006	1,558	—
2014	1,398	−10.3%
2022	1,760	+25.9%
2006-2014: Census populations Source:

== Education ==
Raa Atoll Education Centre has a school, called Maduvvaree School, on the island.
