= Aishath Nahula =

Maldivian politician (born 1982)

- އައިޝަތު ނަހުލާ
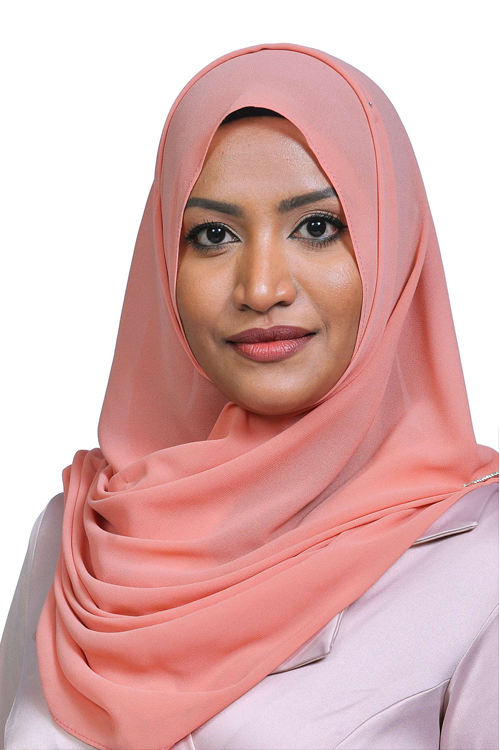
- Official portrait, 2018

Minister of Transport and Civil Aviation
- In office 17 November 2018 – 17 November 2023
- President: Ibrahim Mohamed Solih
- Preceded by: Ameen Ibrahim
- Succeeded by: Mohamed Ameen

Council Member of the Jumhooree Party
- Incumbent
- Assumed office 24 August 2018

Personal details
- Born: Aishath Nahula; 12 March 1982 (age 44) Hoarafushi, Haa Alif Atoll, Maldives
- Party: Jumhooree Party
- Spouse: Qasim Ibrahim (m. 2001)
- Children: 6
- Education: Villa College

Aishath Nahula (sometimes known by Aisha; born 12 March 1982) is a Maldivian politician and public figure. She was the Minister of Transport and Civil Aviation of the Maldives from 2018 to 2023, and a current national council member of the Jumhooree Party.

== Career ==
Aisha was elected to the National Executive Council of the Jumhooree Party in June 2018.

During the 2018 presidential elections, Nahula traveled to several islands on campaign to garner support for MDP/joint opposition presidential candidate Ibrahim Mohamed Solih who won the elections which were held on 23 September 2018.

On 17 November 2018, president Ibrahim Mohamed Solih appointed Nahula as the Minister of Transport and Civil Aviation.

On 26 February 2023, she was elected as a Deputy Leader of the Jumhooree Party.

She also ran for the South Hulhumale' constituency during the 2024 Maldivian parliamentary election, but she lost to Ahmed Shamheed, an MDP member.

== Controversies and allegations ==
During her ministerial term, she was accused of corruption along with a senior employee at the ministry for registering vehicles against regulations, in addition to allegedly obtaining financial gains through these means. In addition, she was also fined by the Health Protection Agency due to not quarantining for 14 days after she came back from Dubai.

In 2023, she was summoned to the People's Majlis' Committee on National Development and Heritage due to the public complaints filed against her. Complaints include delays in receiving domain boards after making payment as well as lack of cooperation from the ministry.

== Personal life ==
Nahula was born on 12 March 1982 in Hoarafushi. She is married to Qasim Ibrahim, a businessman and leader of the Jumhooree Party of Maldives. Together, they have six children.
