= Wildlife of the Maldives =

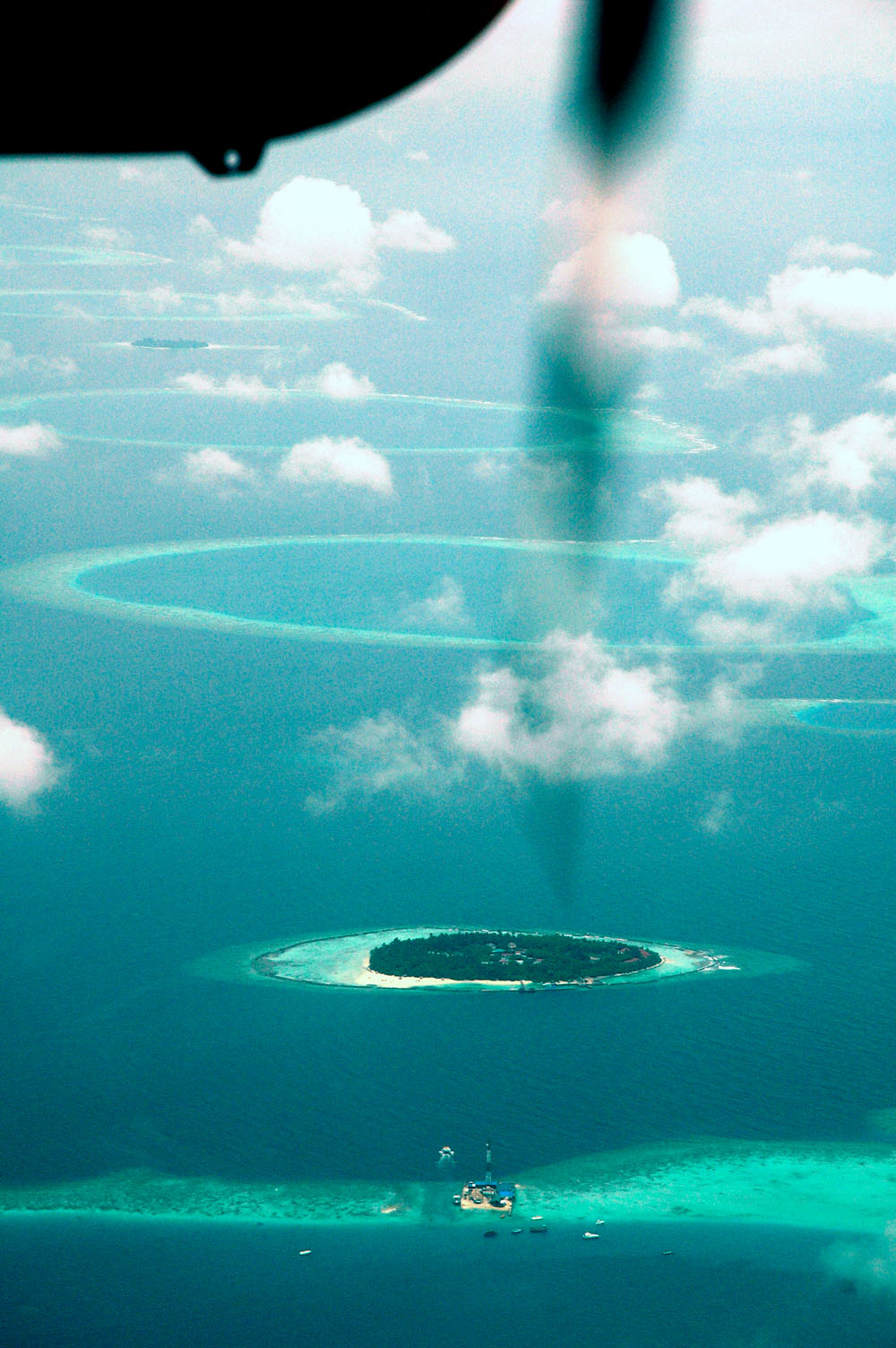
A glimpse of the Maldive reefs, rich in different kinds of fauna, Ari Atoll

The wildlife of the Maldives includes the flora and fauna of the islands, reefs, and the surrounding ocean. Recent scientific studies suggest that the fauna varies greatly between atolls following a north–south gradient, but important differences between neighbouring atolls were also found (especially in terms of sea animals), which may be linked to differences in fishing pressure – including poaching.

== Ecology ==
The land-based biotopes of the Maldives are highly endangered. The little land available in the country is being swiftly developed. Formerly uninhabited islands were only occasionally visited, but now almost no untouched uninhabited islands remain. Many of the natural habitats of local species have been severely threatened or destroyed during the past decades of development.

Coral reef habitats have also been damaged, as the pressure for land has brought about the creation of artificial islands. Some reefs have been filled with rubble with little regard for the changes in the currents on the reef shelf and how the new pattern would affect coral growth and its related life forms on the reef edges.

== Plants ==
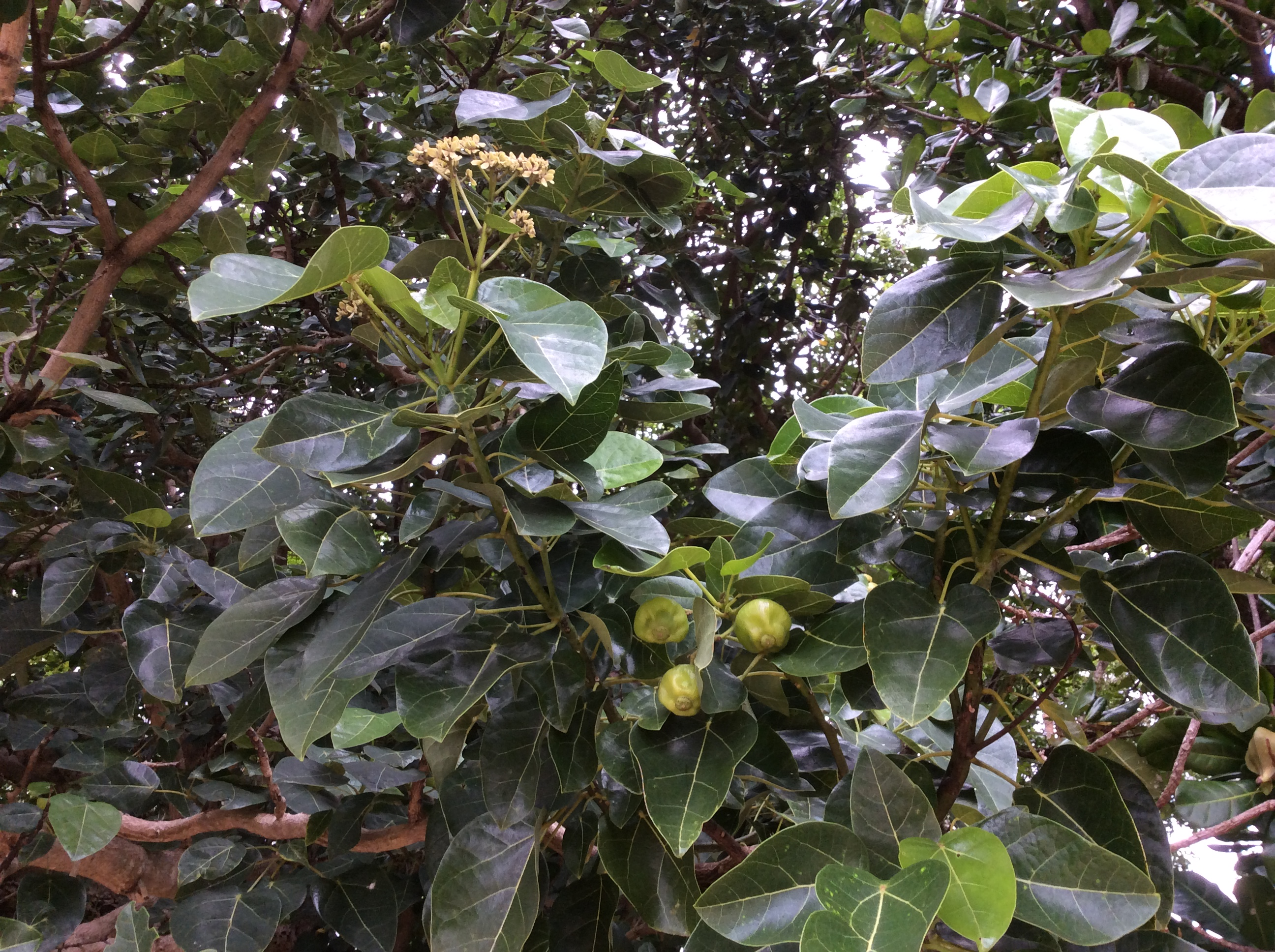
The lantern tree (Hernandia nymphaeifolia) is found in the Maldives

The Maldives have a rich variety of plant life despite the lack of fertile soils. There are three plant communities. The first is the foreshore, which is closest to the ocean and mostly bare except for hardy creeping vines such as Ipomoea species. The next is the beach crest, which is slightly more protected from the tides. Scaevola taccada, Pemphis acidula, Tournefortia argentea, and Guettarda speciosa are very common and often dominant there. Finally, the inner island habitats are the most protected. Sometimes dense coconut plantations and moist soils allow the growth of understory trees, like Morinda citrifolia or Guettarda speciosa. On northern islands, Hibiscus tiliaceus or Premna serratifolia form pure stands. Mixed forests are also common. Out of the vascular plants of the Maldives, 260 grow in the wild and are either native or naturalized, while an additional 323 are cultivated.

=== Mangrove forests ===
Mangroves are found in brackish or muddy areas of the Maldives. Fourteen species over ten genera are native to the Maldives, including one fern, Acrostichum aureum.

Flora gallery

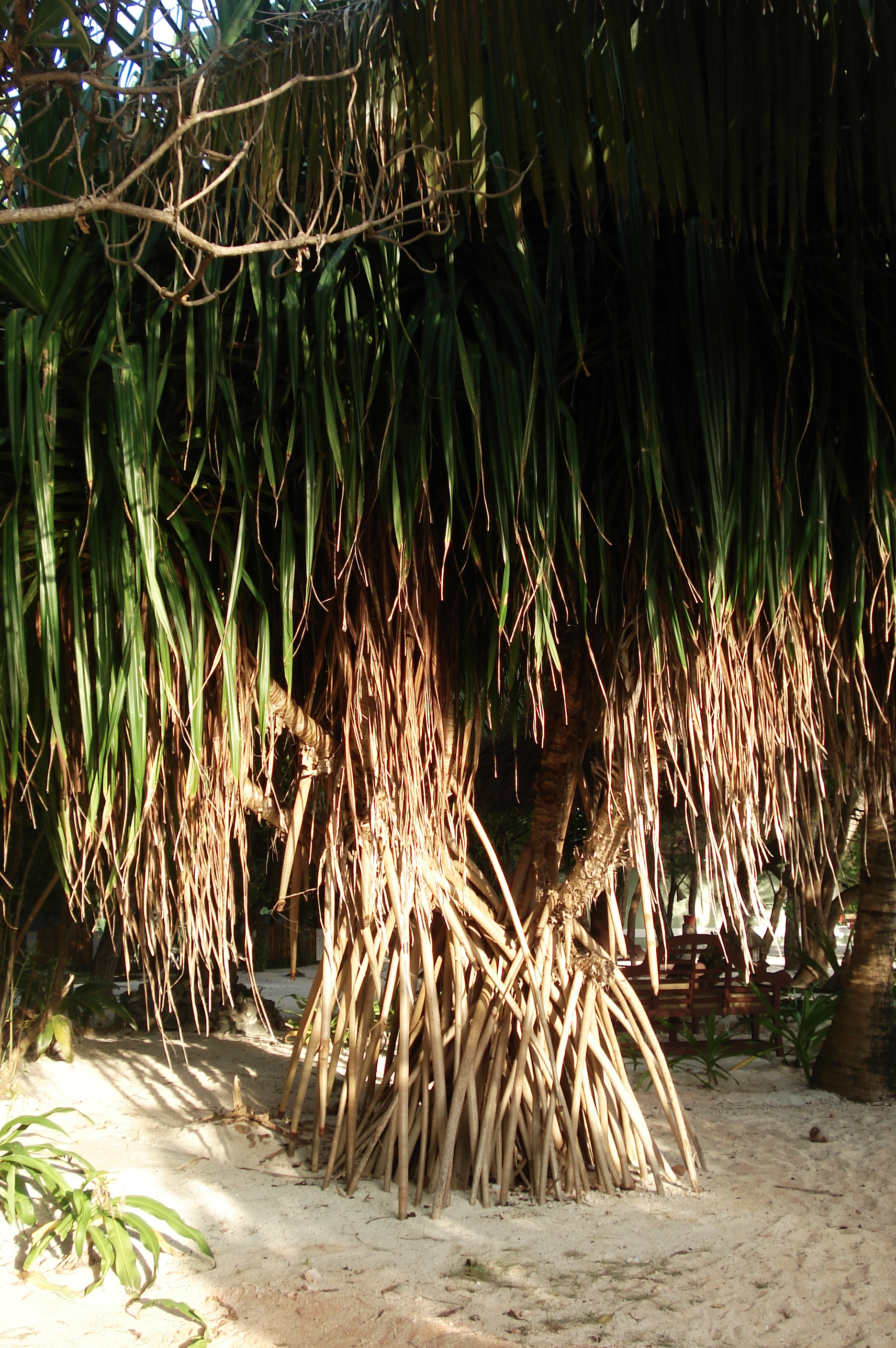
Pandanus tectorius

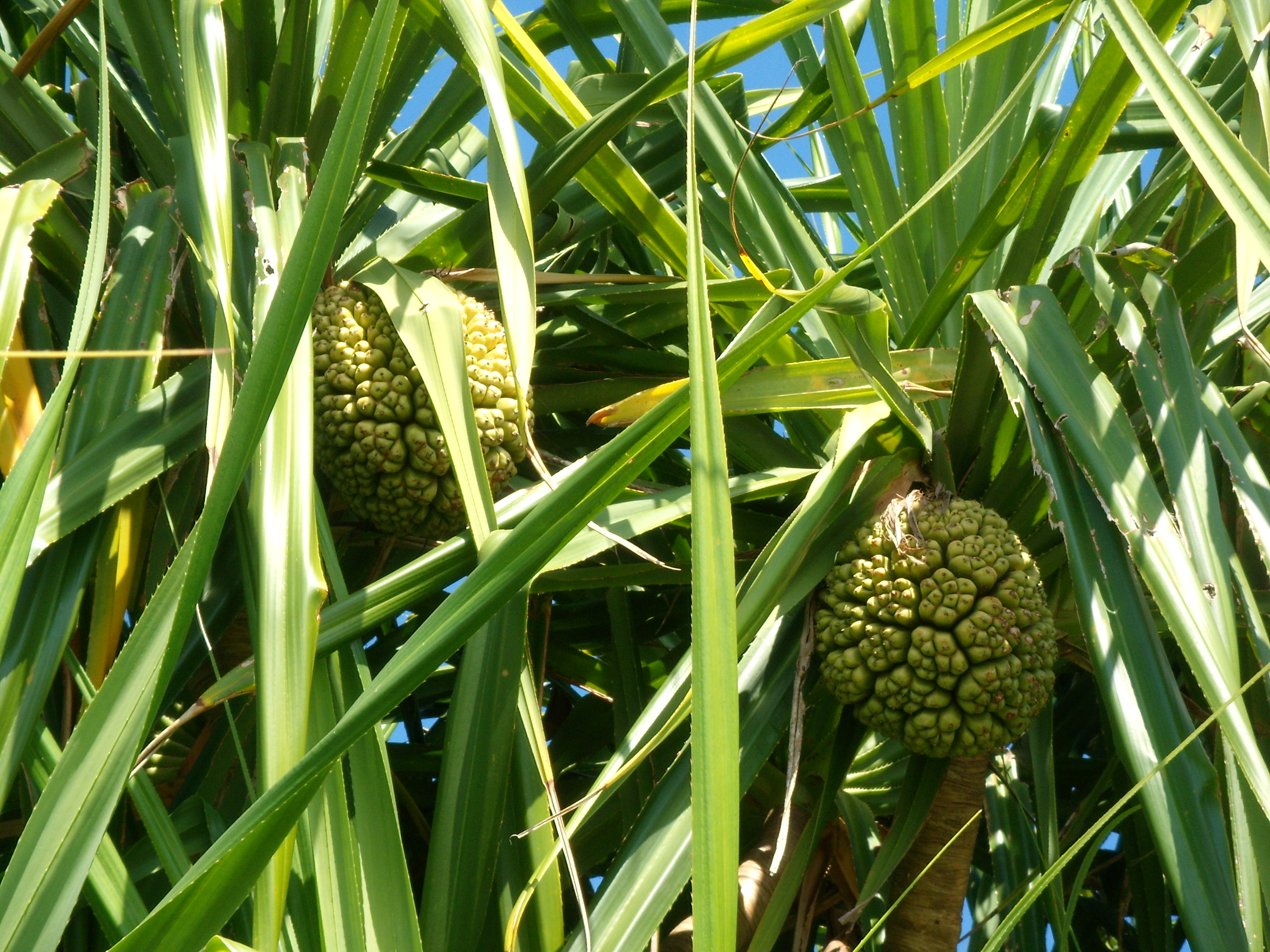
Pandanus fascicularis

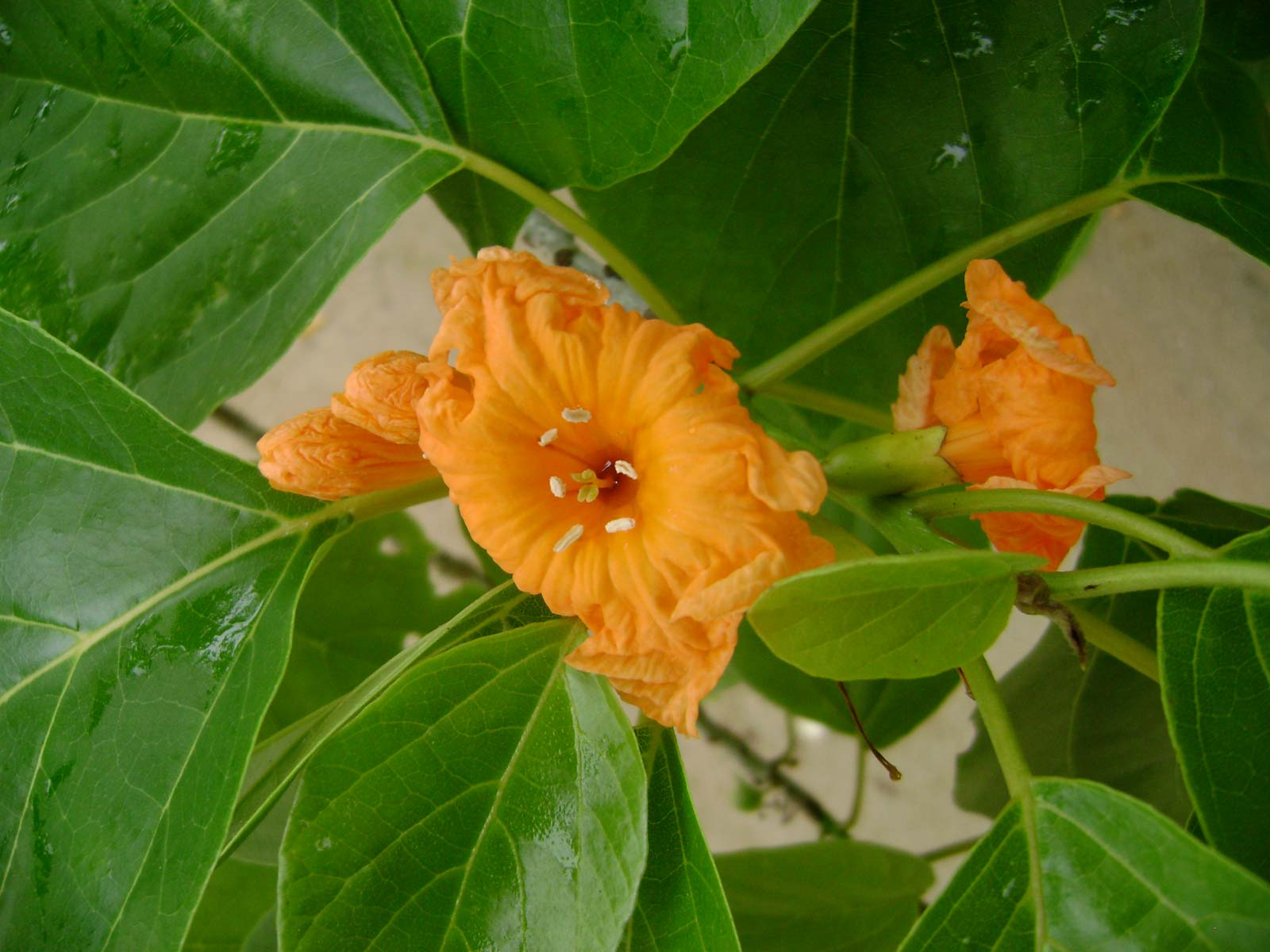
Cordia subcordata

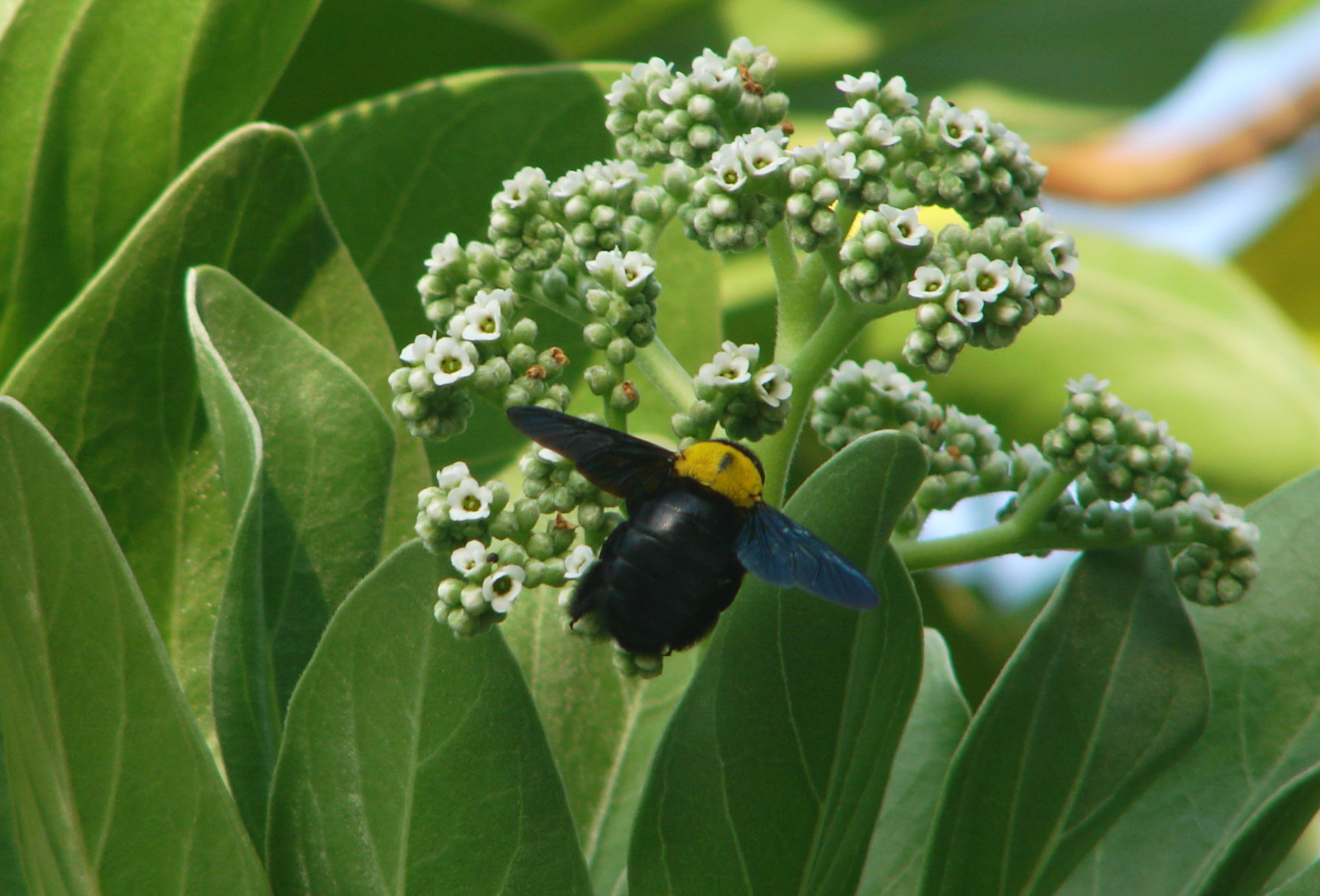
Heliotropium foertherianum

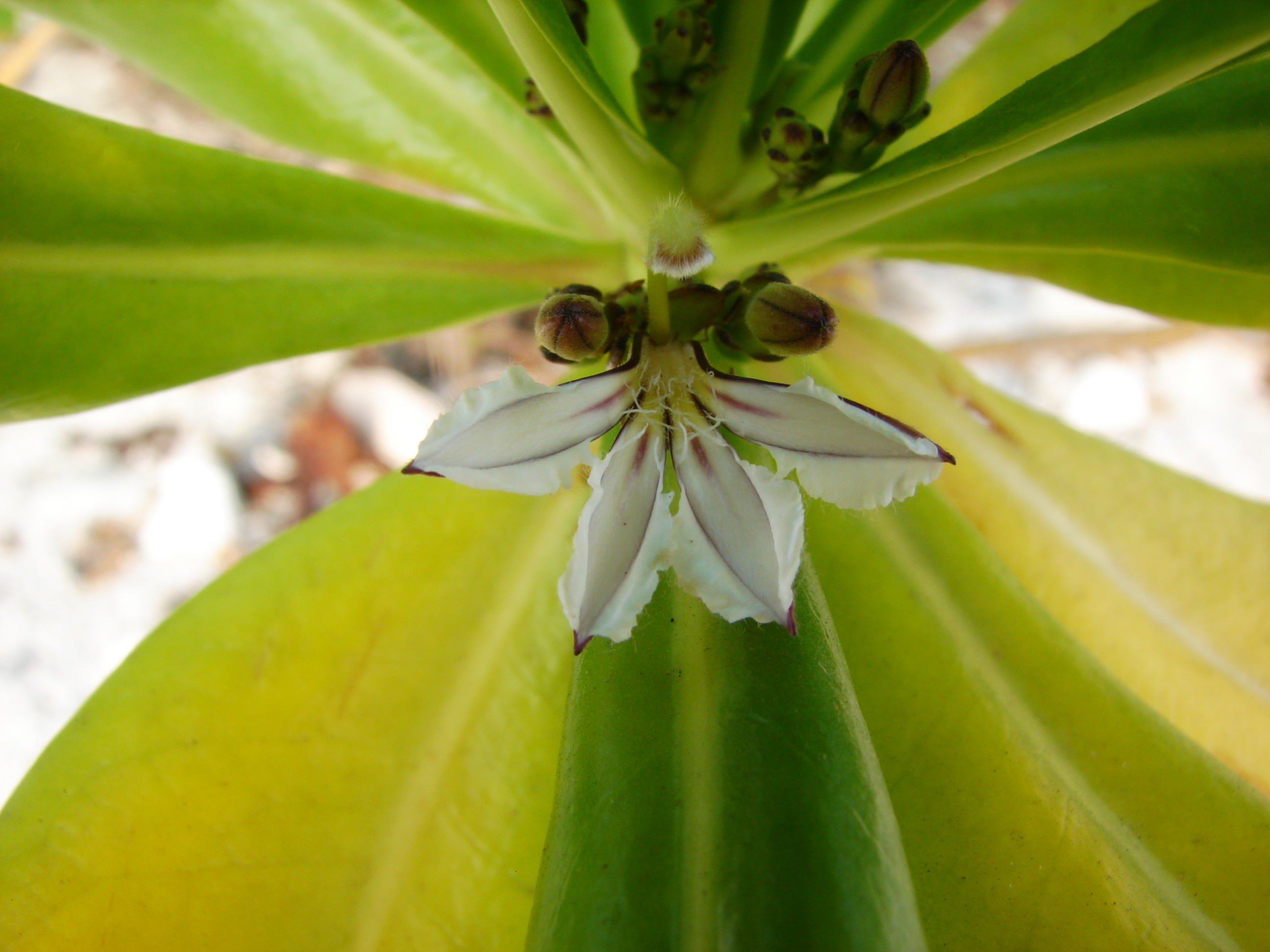
Scaevola taccada

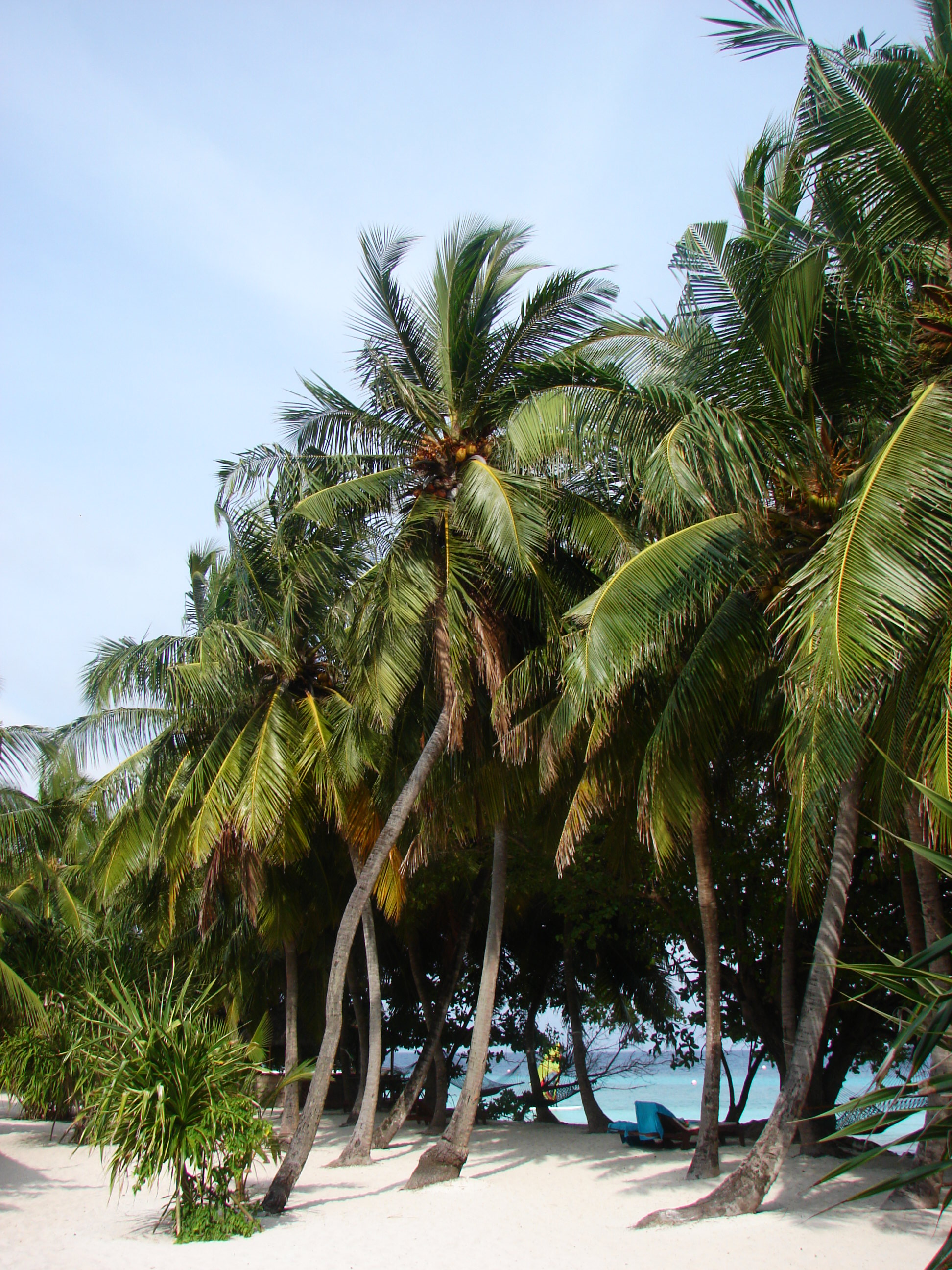
Coconut trees

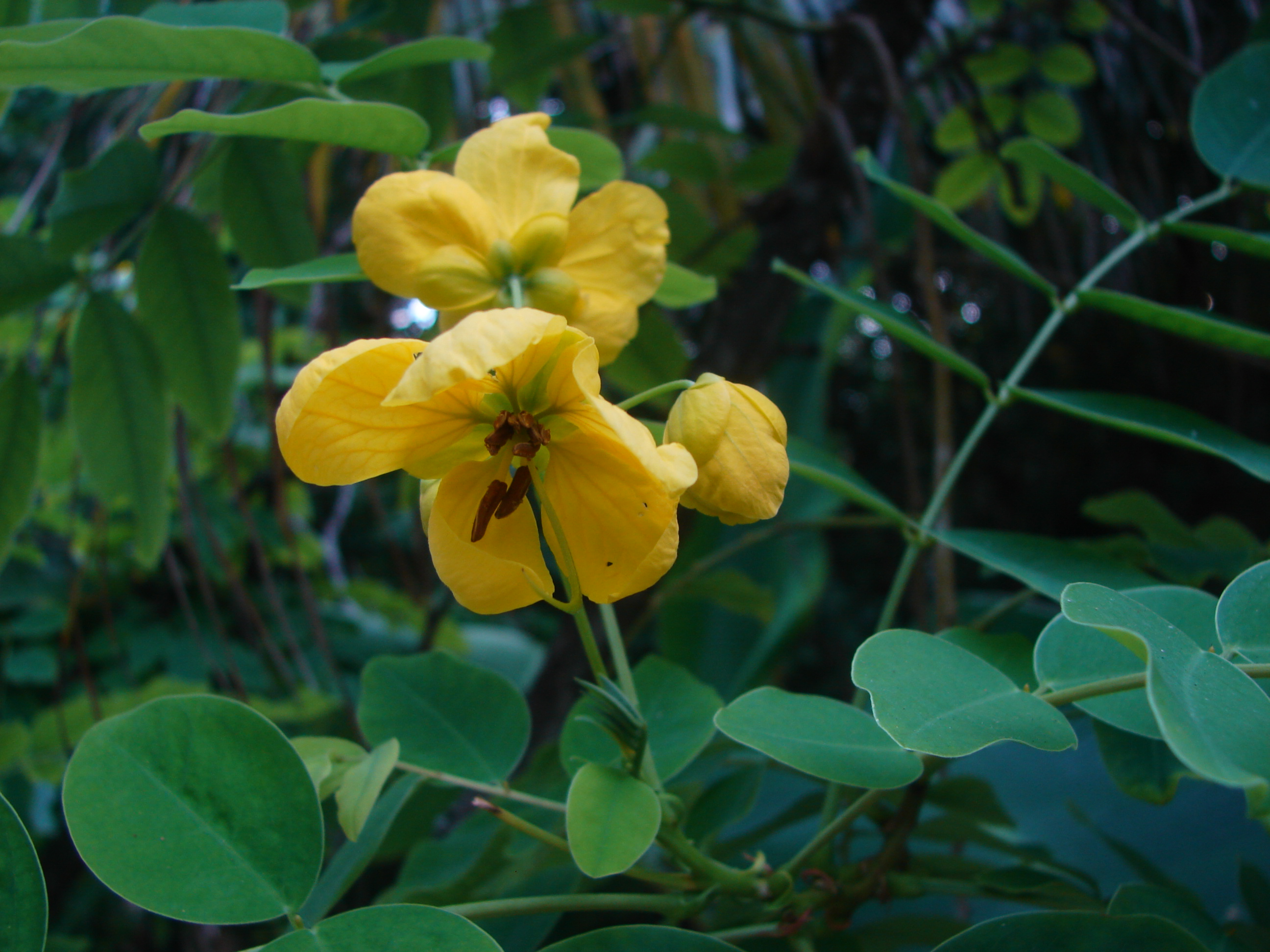
Senna occidentalis

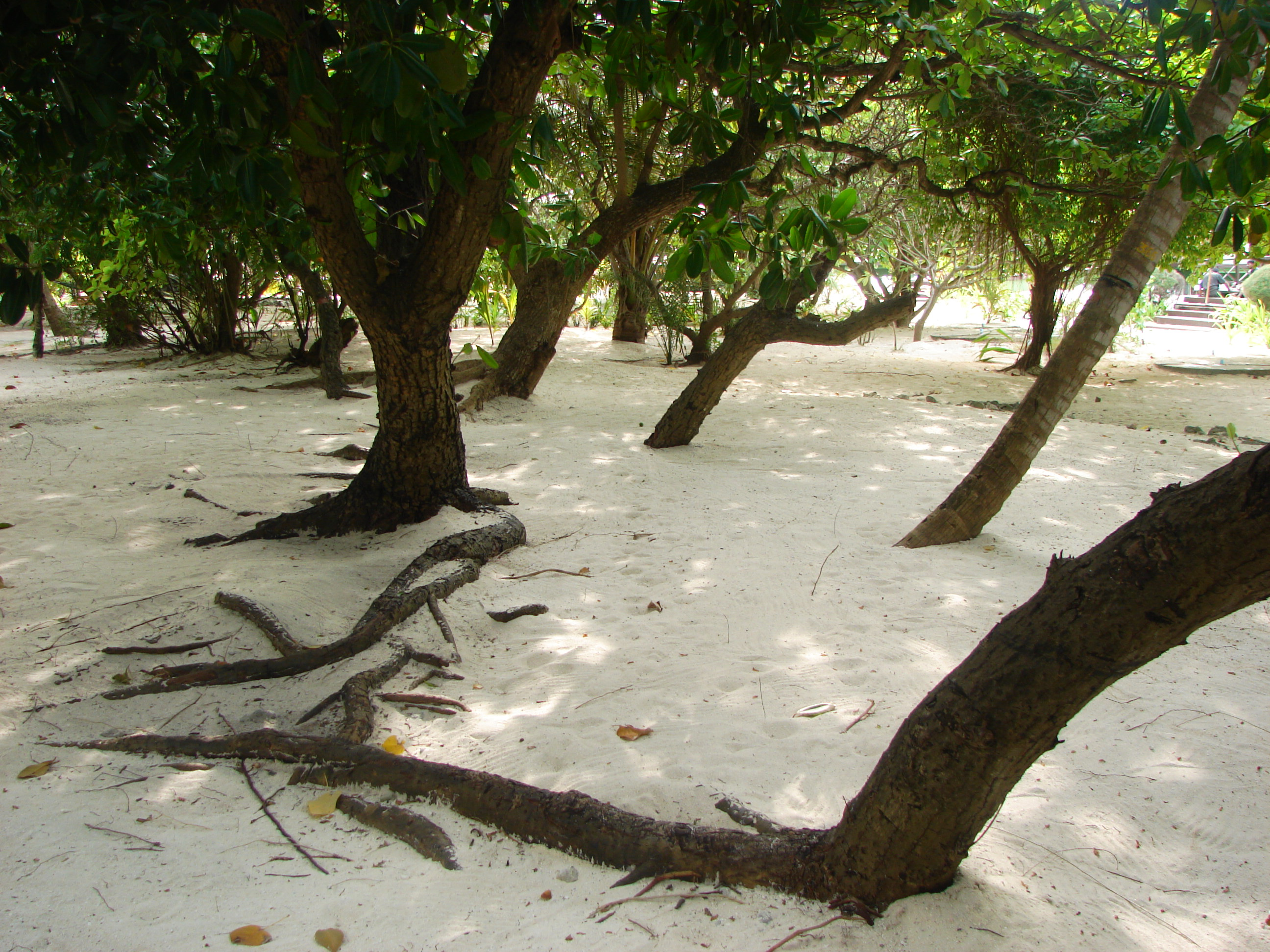
Calophyllum inophyllum

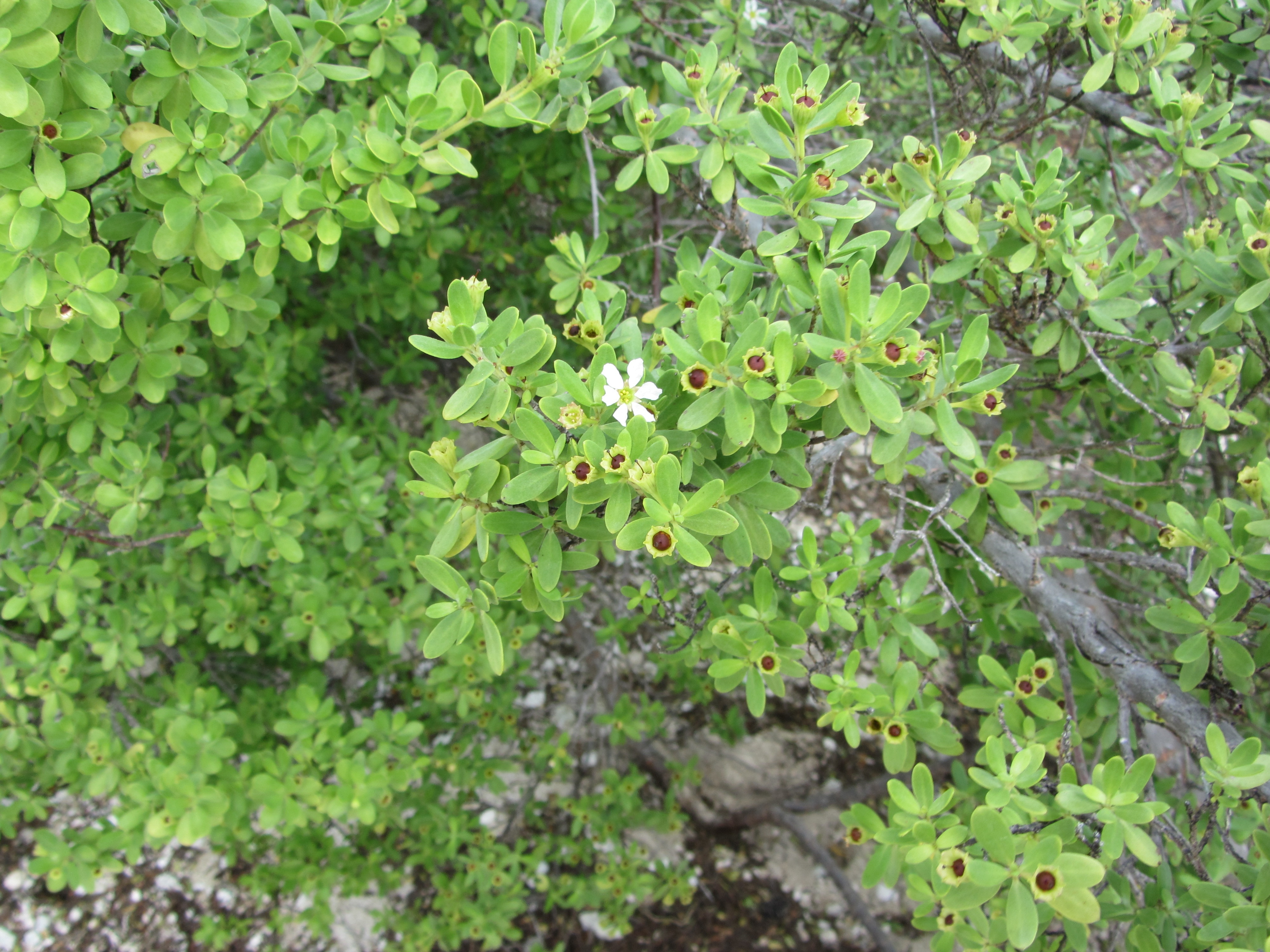
Pemphis acidula

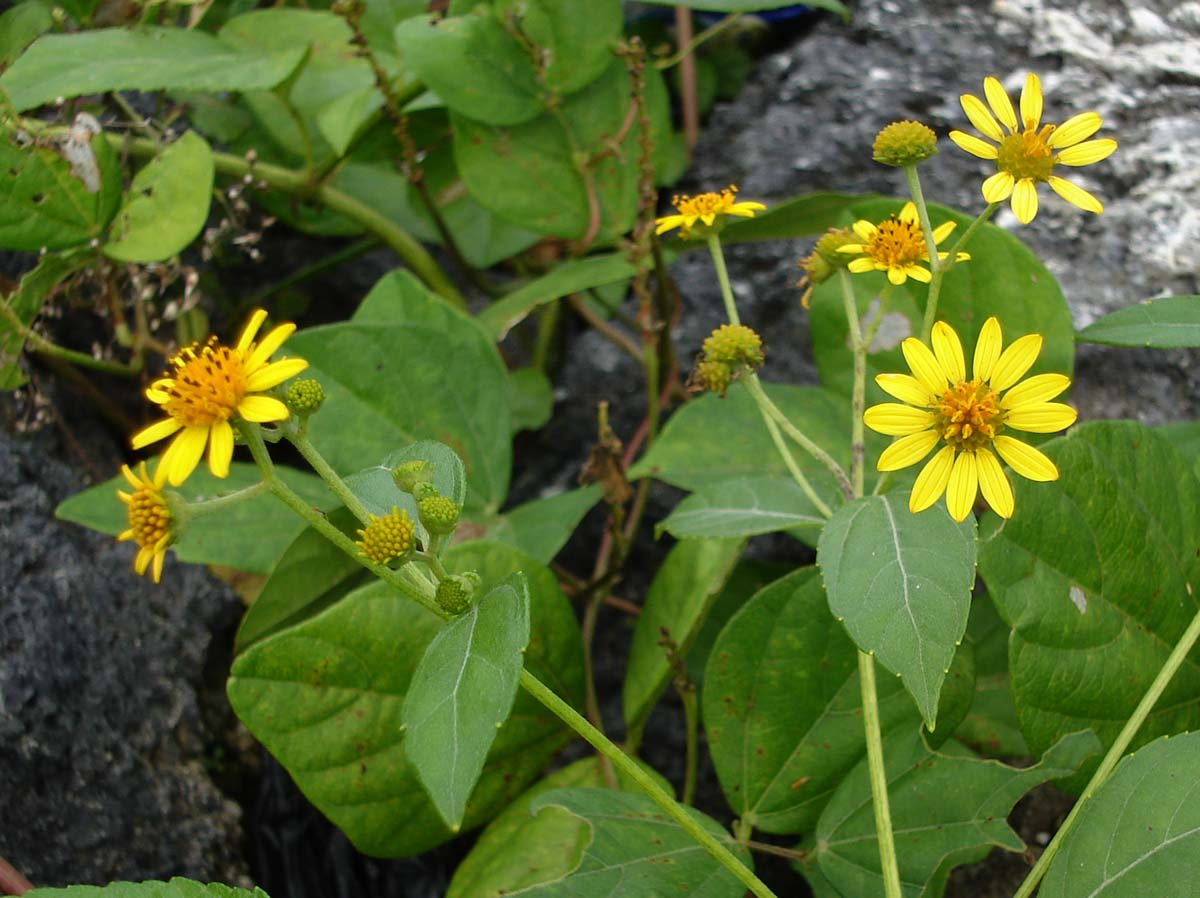
Mirihi

== Vertebrates ==
=== Fish ===
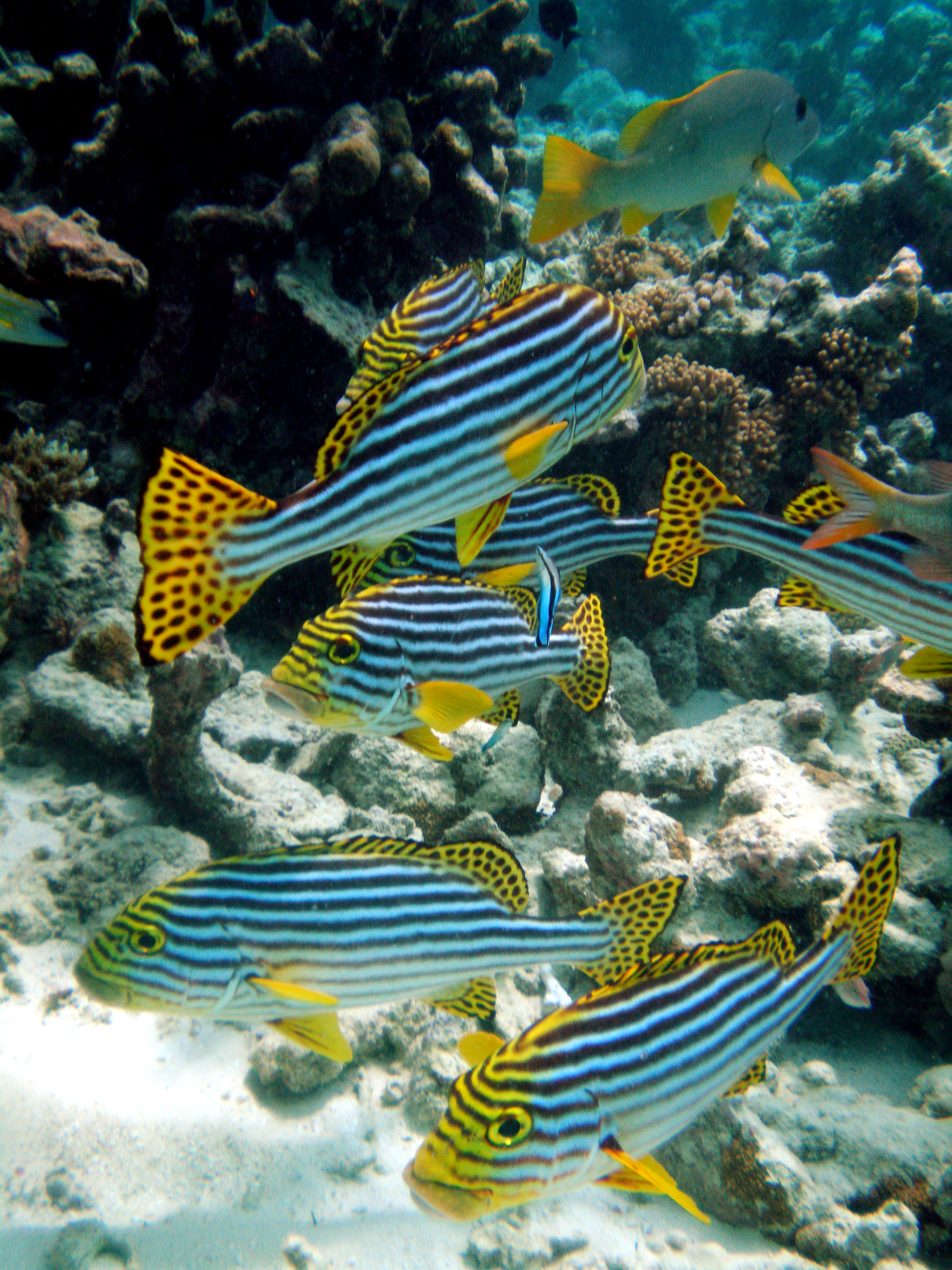
Oriental sweetlips (Plectorhinchus vittatus)

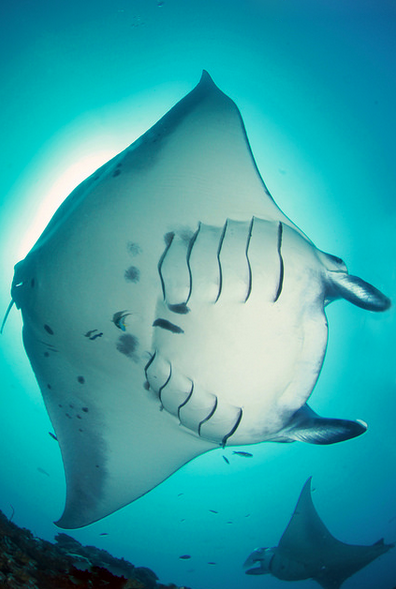
Giant oceanic manta ray (Mobula birostris) at Himandhoo Manta Point, Maldives

There is a wide diversity of sea life in the Maldives, with corals and over 2,000 species of fish, ranging from colourful reef fish to the blacktip reef shark, moray eels, and a wide variety of rays: manta ray, stingray, and eagle ray. The Maldivian waters are also home to the whale shark. The waters around the Maldives are abundant in rare species of biological and commercial value, with tuna fisheries being one of the traditional commercial resources. In the few ponds and marshes there are freshwater fish, like milkfish (Chanos chanos) and smaller species. The tilapia or mouth-breeder was introduced by a UN agency in the 1970s.

Sealife gallery

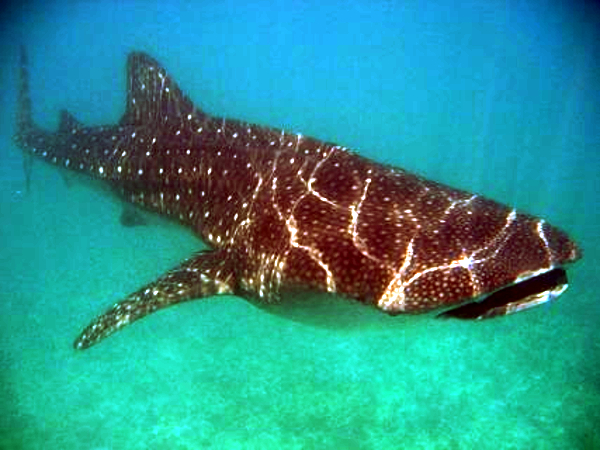
Whale shark (Rhincodon typus)

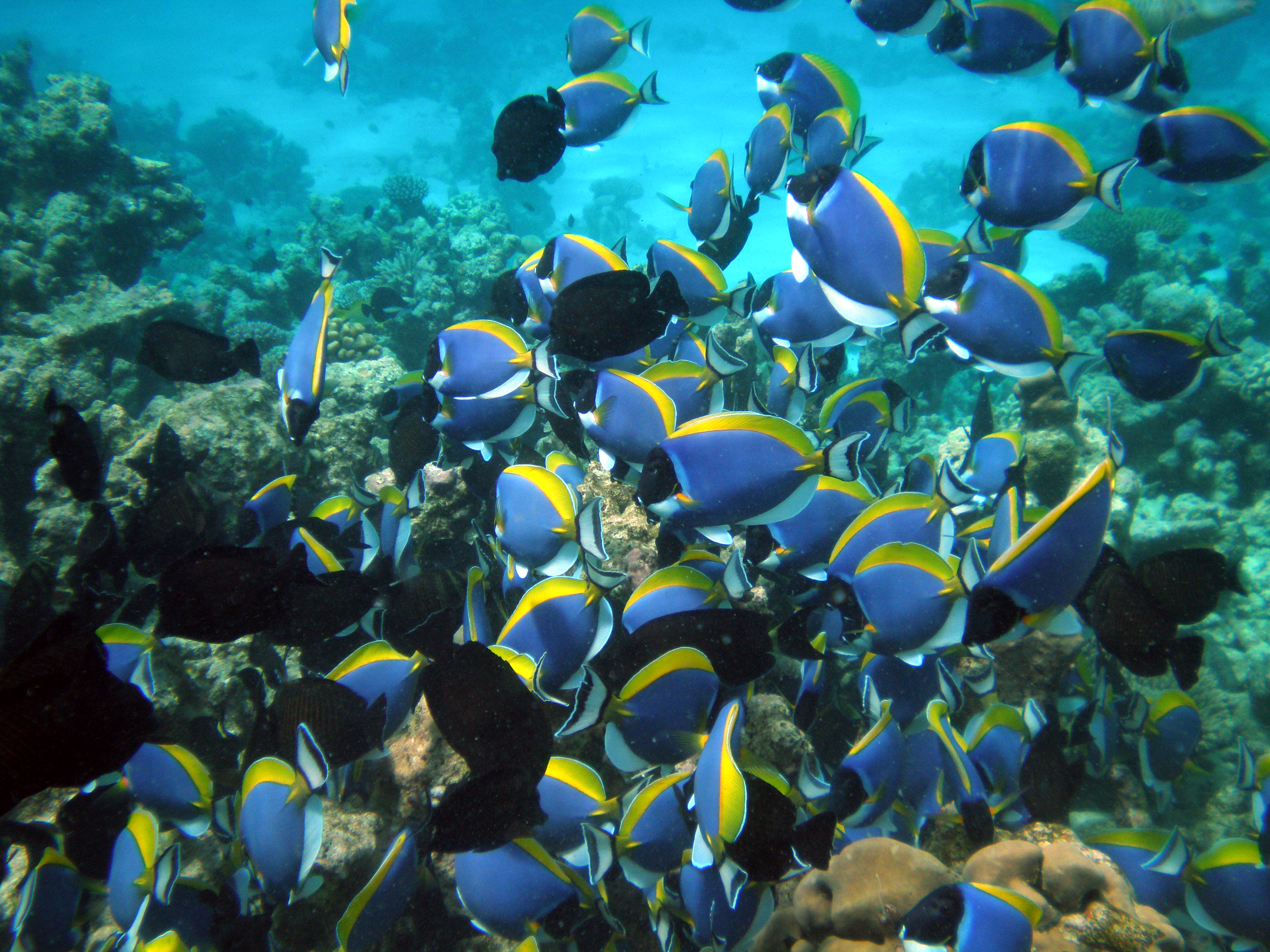
Powder-blue surgeonfish (Acanthurus leucosternon)

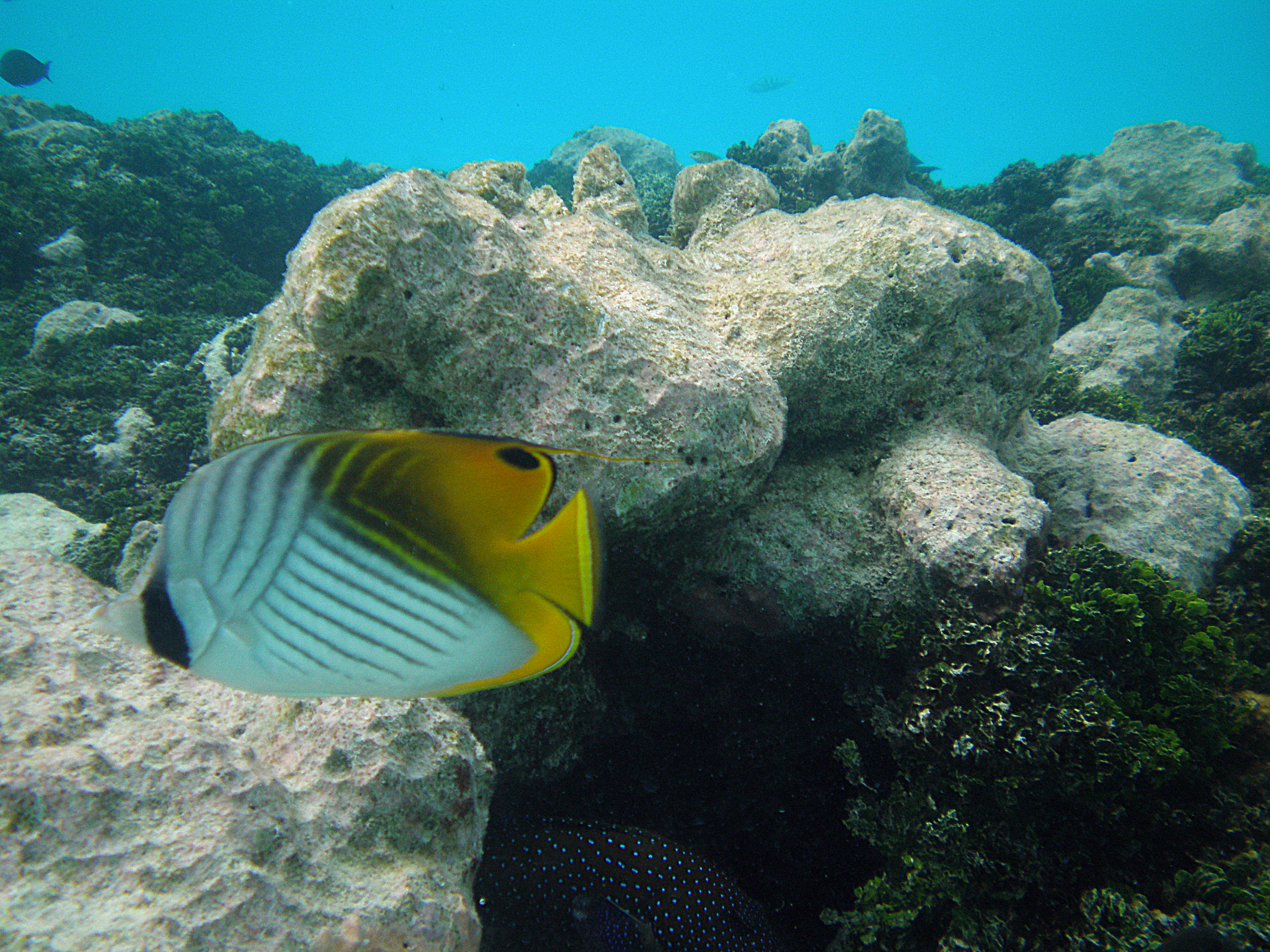
Threadfin butterflyfish (Chaetodon auriga)

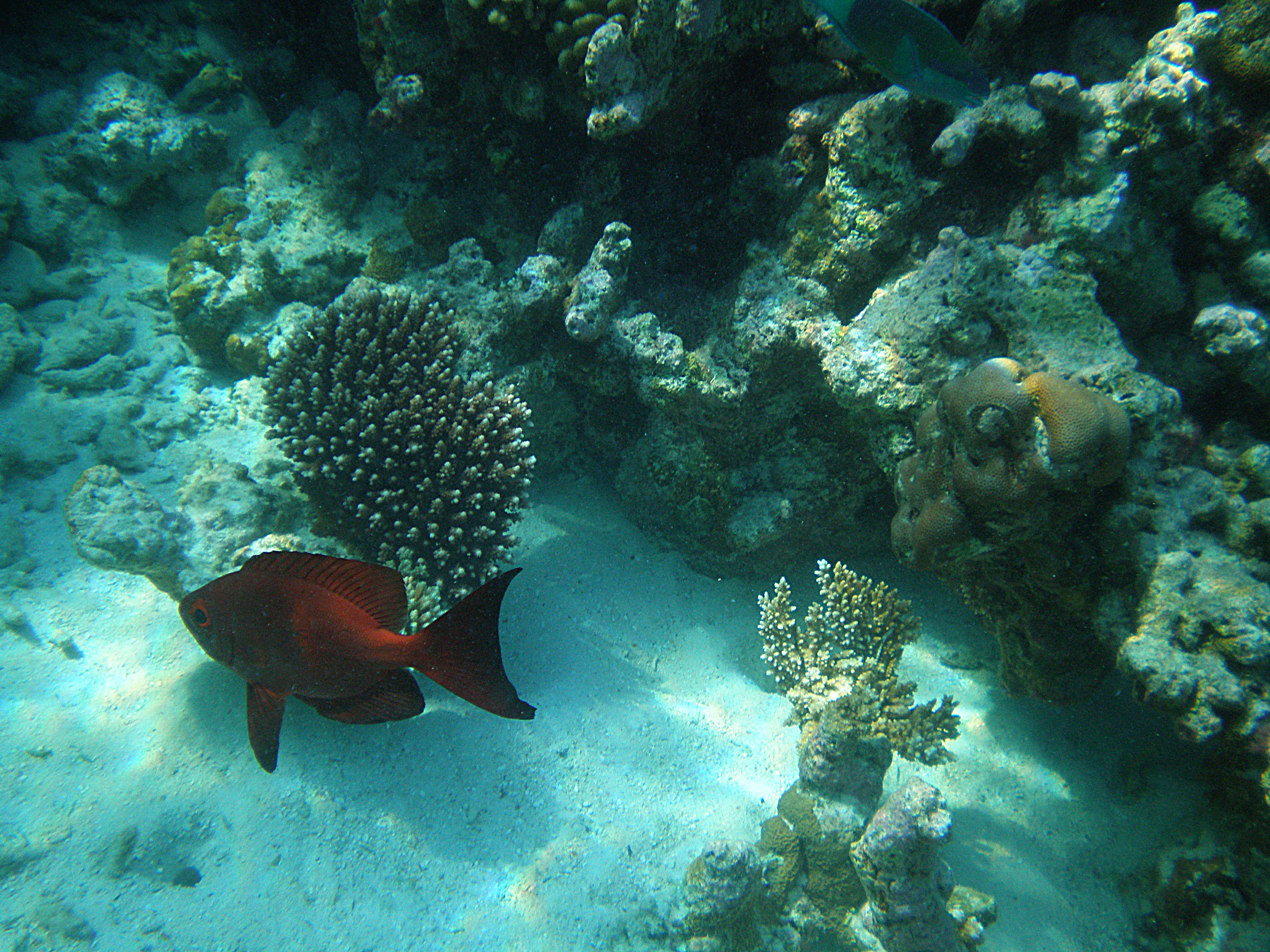
Bullseye (Priacanthus hamrur)

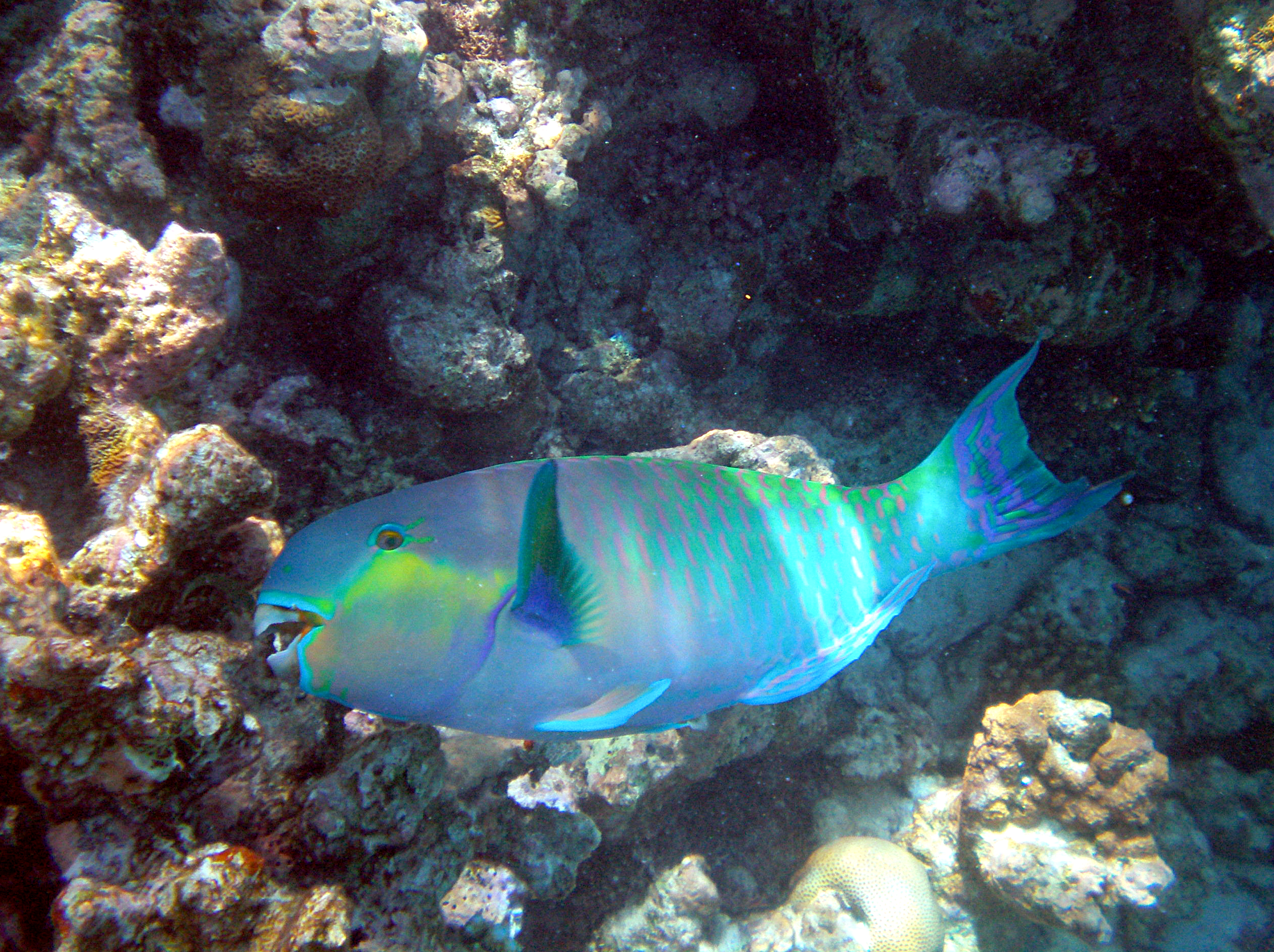
Parrotfish (Scaridae)

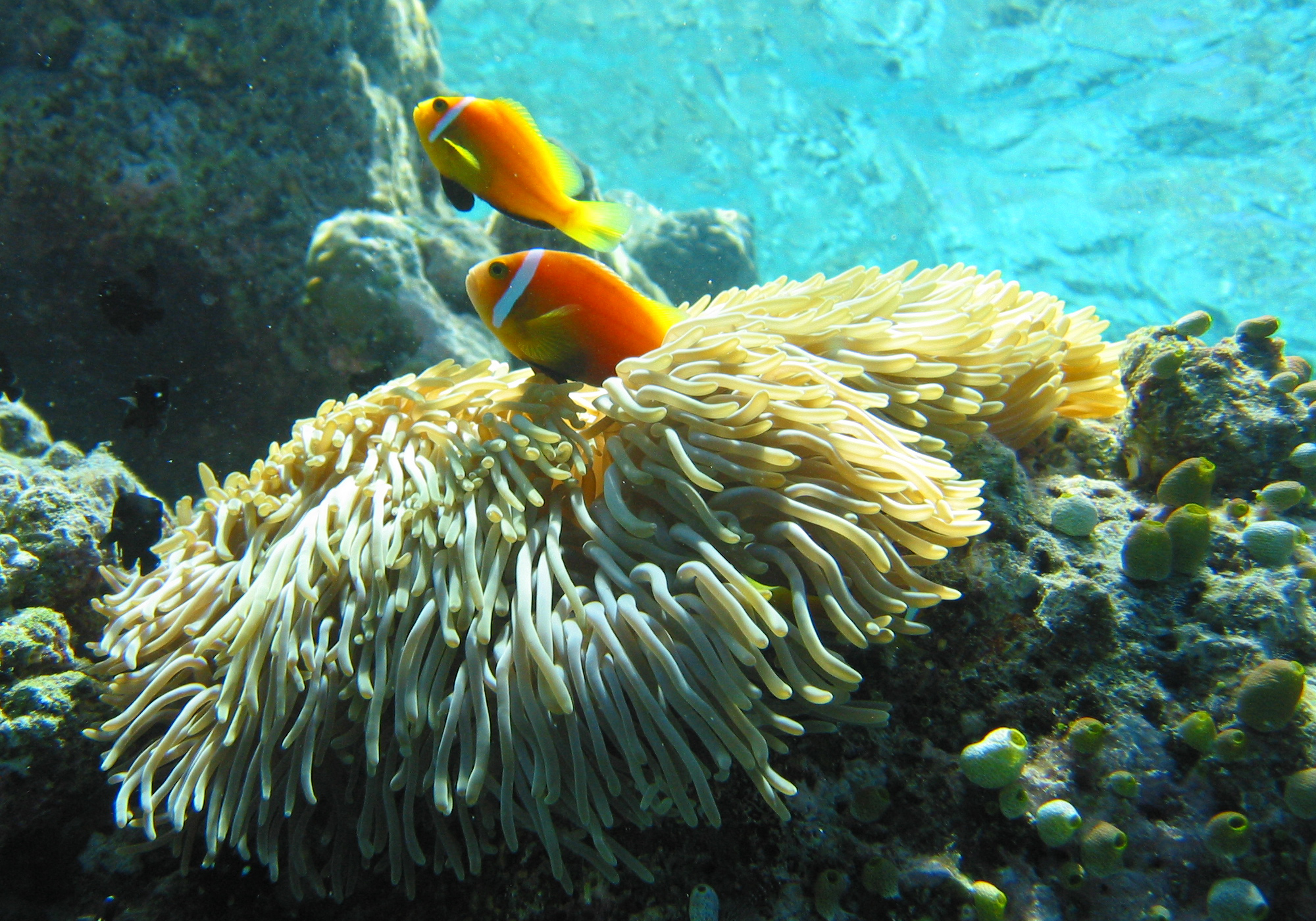
Clownfish (Amphiprioninae)

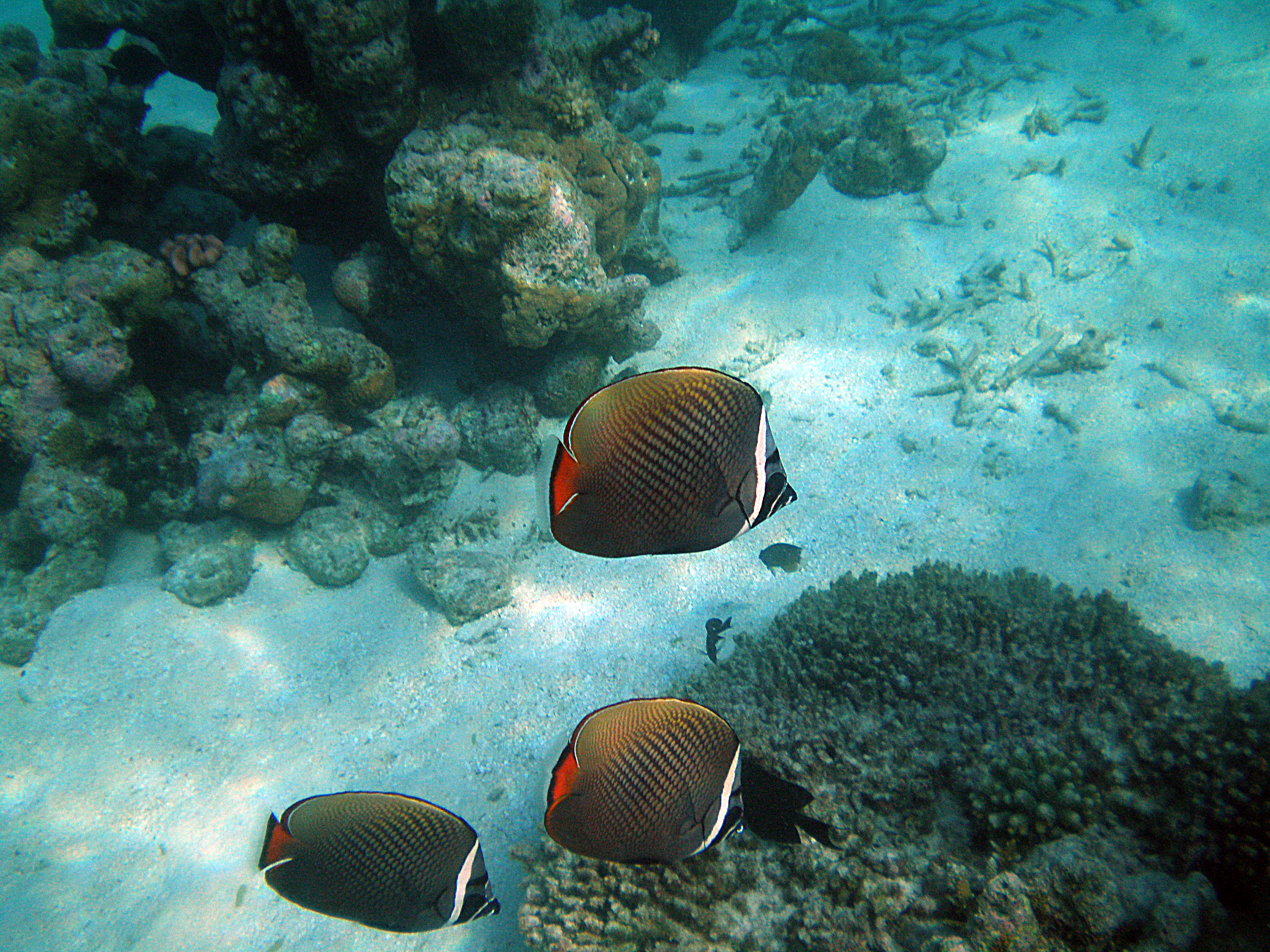
Redtail butterflyfish (Chaetodon collare)

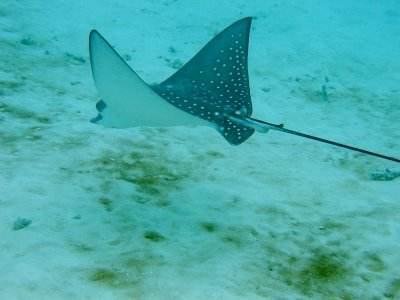
Spotted eagle ray (Aetobatus narinari)

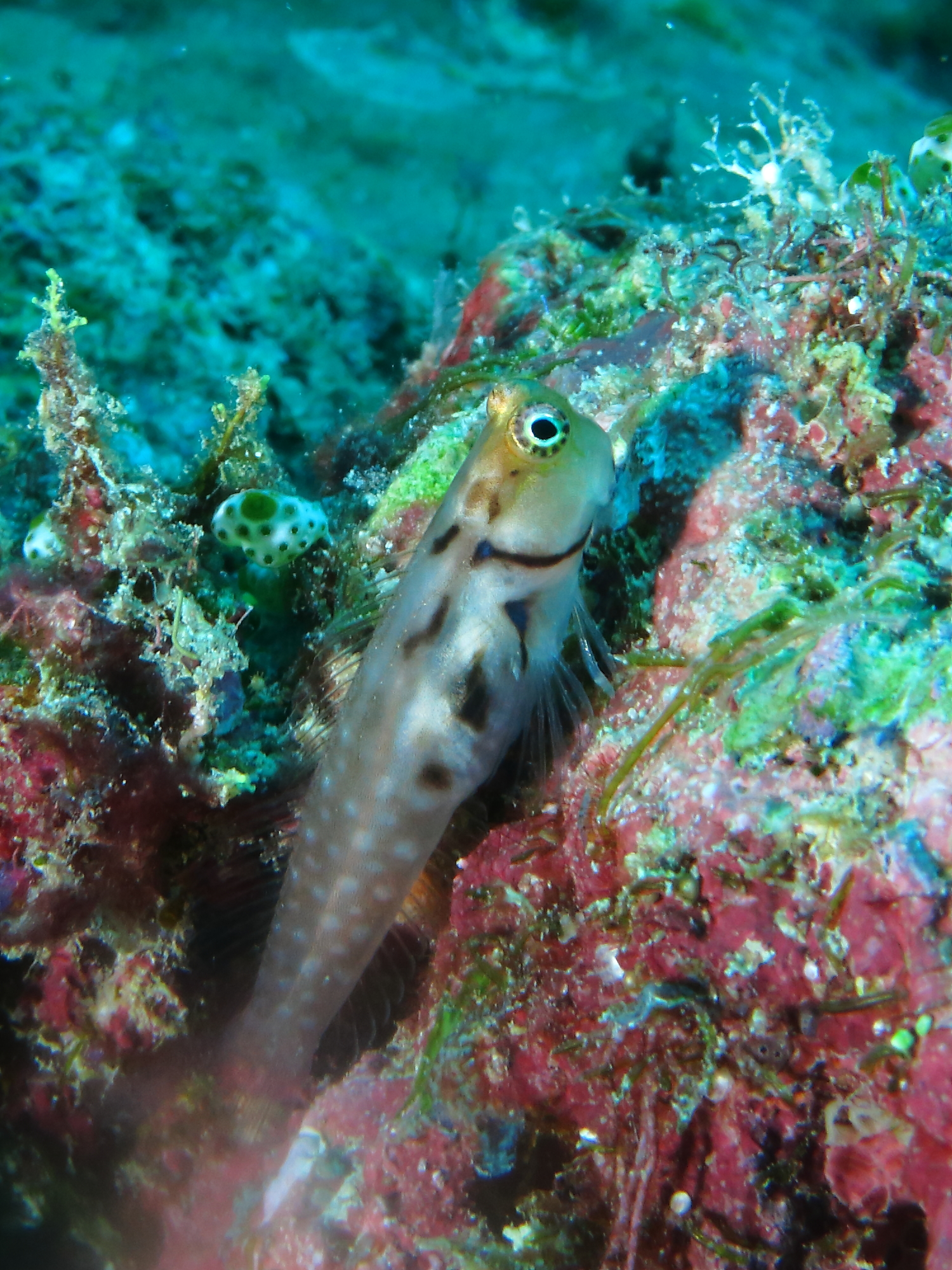
Maldives Blenny (Ecsenius minutus)

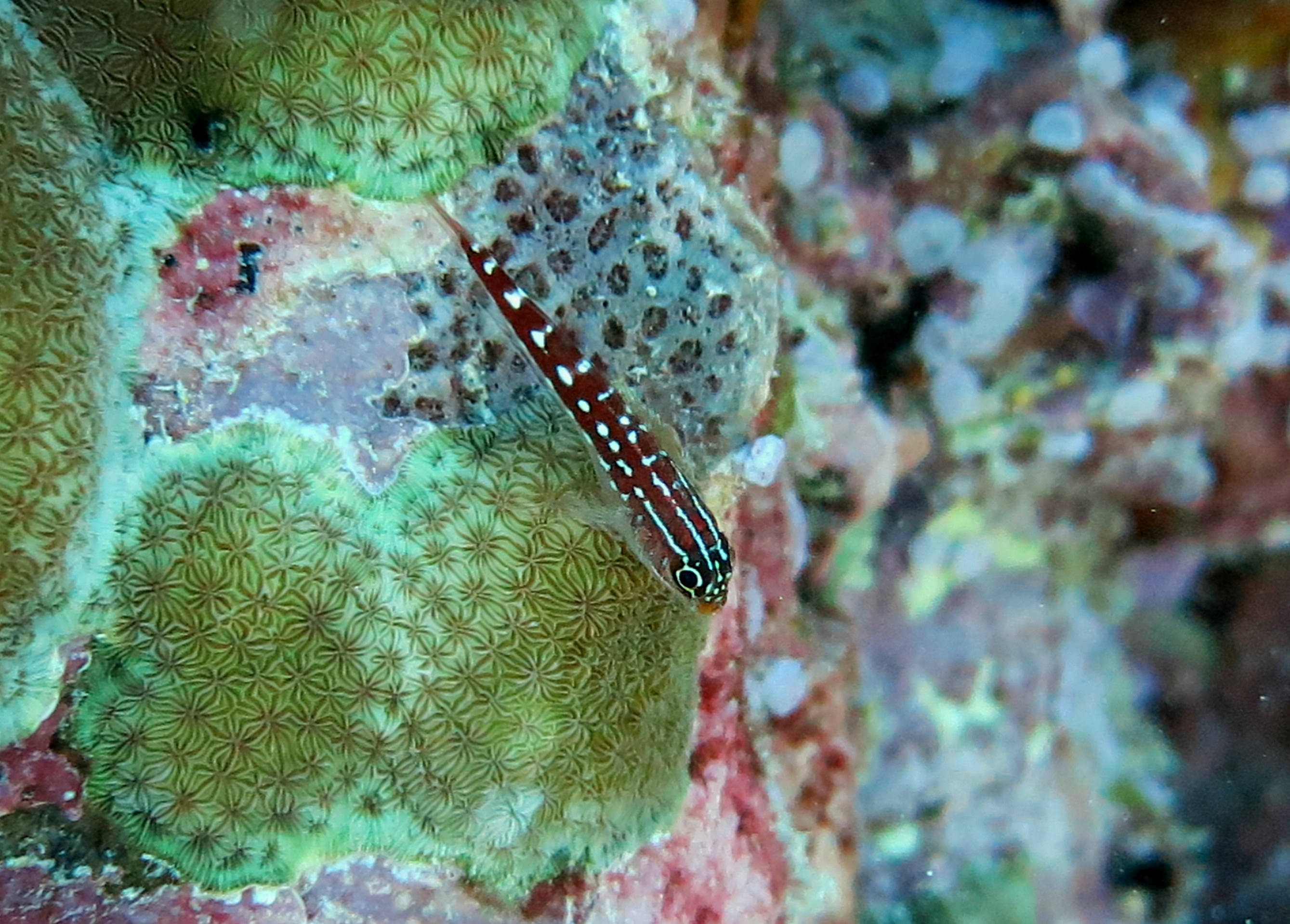
Threefin Blenny (Helcogramma maldivensis)

=== Reptiles and amphibians ===
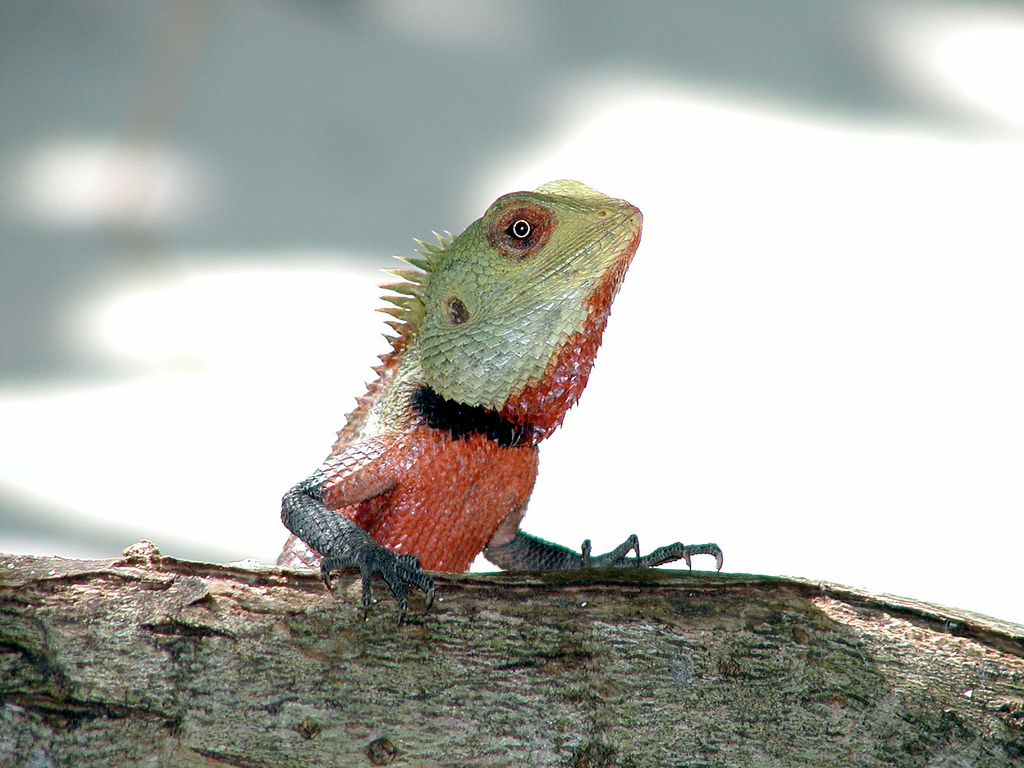
Oriental garden lizard (Calotes versicolor)

Since the islands are very small, land-based reptiles are rare. There is a species of gecko, as well as one species of agamid lizard, the oriental garden lizard (Calotes versicolor), the white-spotted supple skink (Riopa albopunctata), the Indian wolf snake (Lycodon aulicus) and the brahminy blind snake (Ramphotyphlops braminus).

In the sea there the green sea turtle (Chelonia mydas), hawksbill sea turtle (Eretmochelys imbricata) and leatherback sea turtle (Dermochelys coriacea), that lay eggs on Maldivian beaches. Sea snakes such as the yellow-bellied sea snake (Hydrophis platurus) that live in the Indian Ocean are occasionally cast up on the shore after storms, where they are rendered helpless and unable to return to the sea. Saltwater crocodiles (Crocodylus porosus) have also been known to reach the islands and dwell in marshy areas.

The southern burrowing frog (Sphaerotheca rolandae) is found in a few islands, while the Asian common toad (Duttaphrynus melanostictus) has a more widespread presence.

=== Birds ===
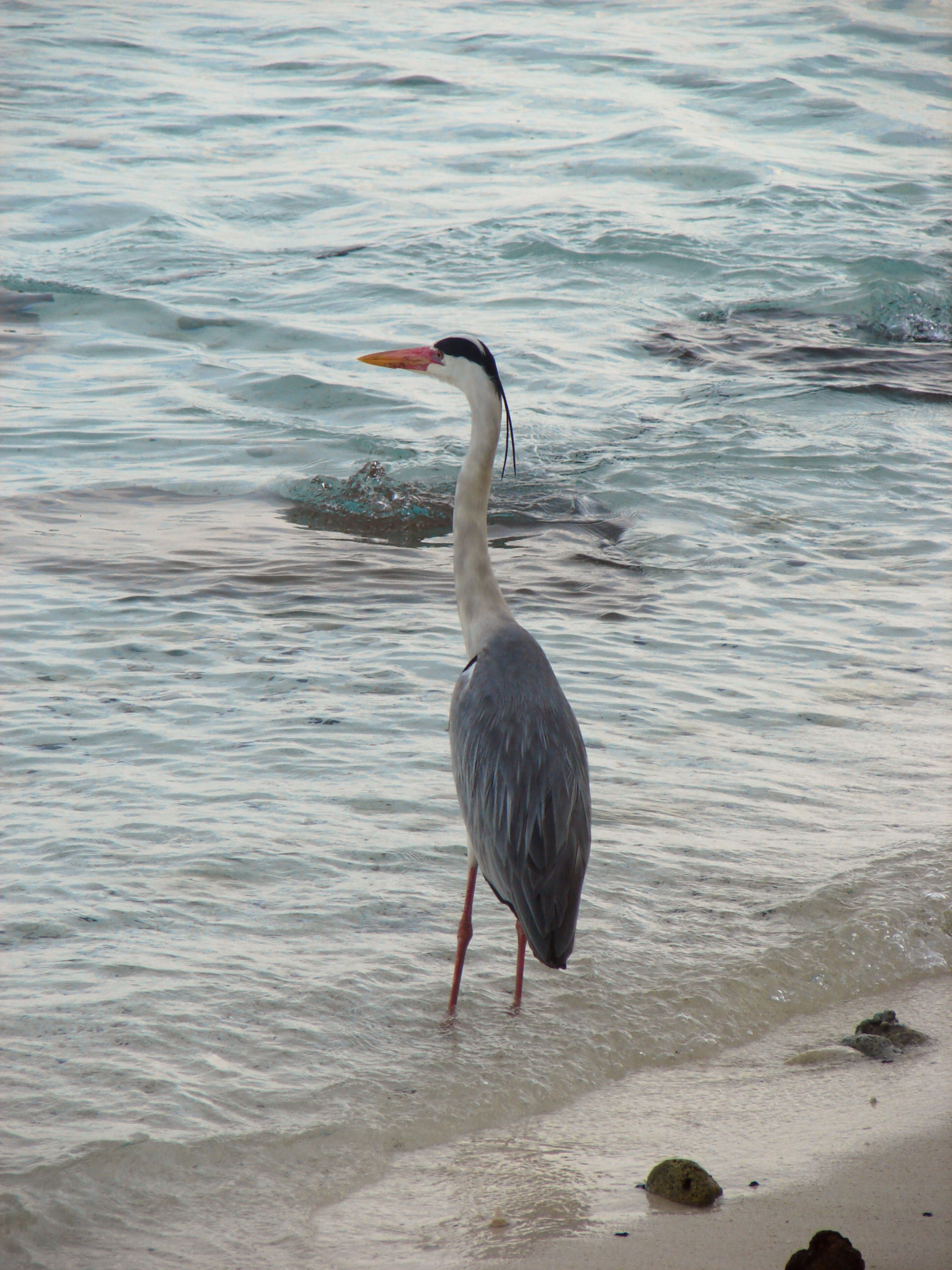
Grey heron (Ardea cinerea) from the Maldives

The location of this Indian Ocean archipelago means that its avifauna is mainly restricted to pelagic birds. Most of the species are Eurasian migratory birds, only a few being typically associated with the Indian sub-continent. Some, like the frigatebird are seasonal. There are also birds that dwell in marshes and island bush, like the grey heron and the moorhen. White terns are found occasionally on the southern islands due to their rich habitats.

Birds

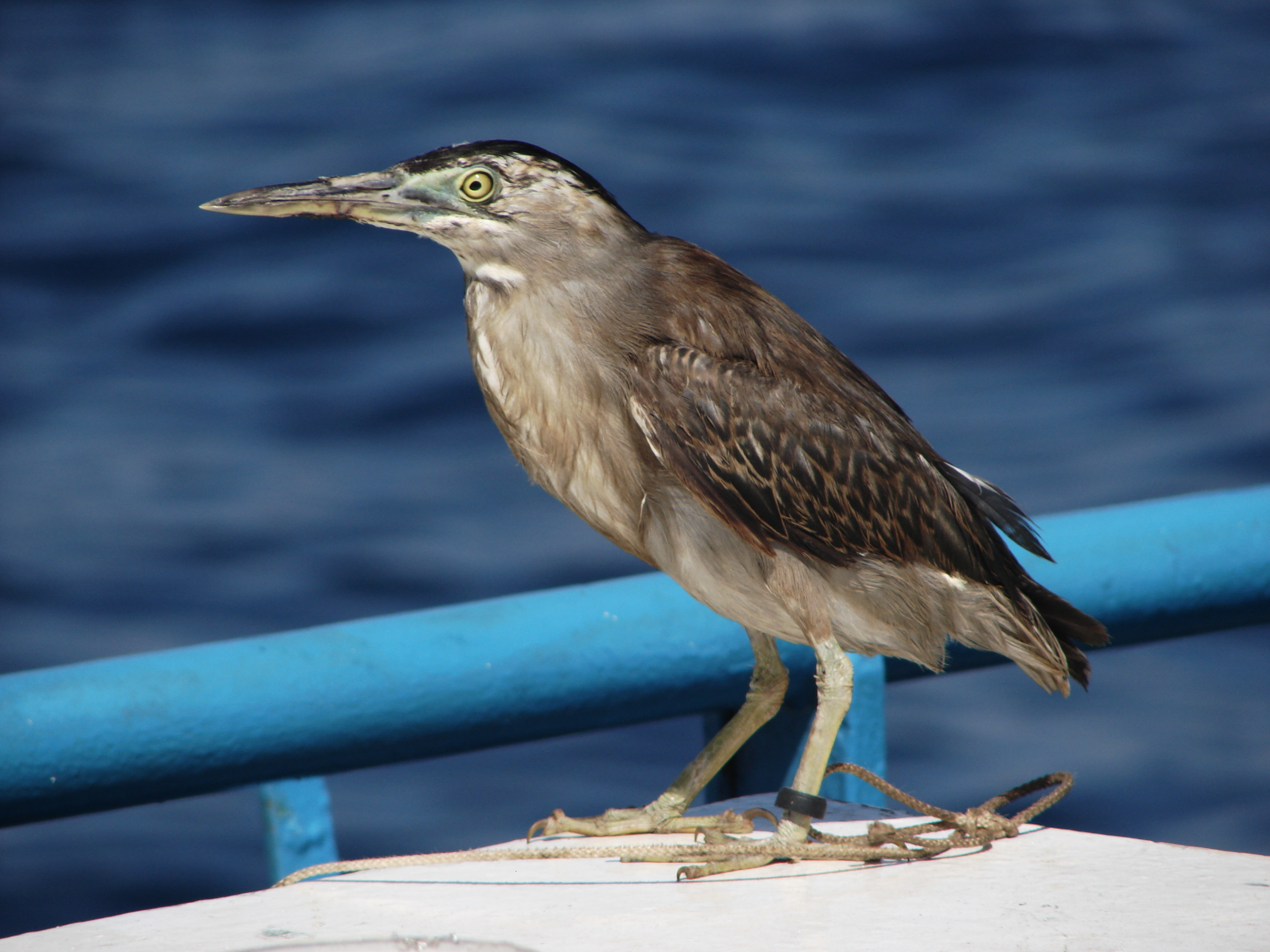
Striated heron (Butorides striata)

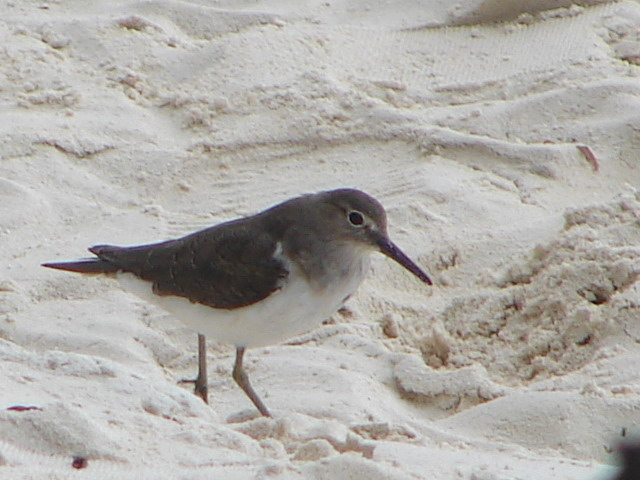
Common sandpiper (Actitis hypoleucos)

=== Mammals ===
There are very few land mammals in the Maldives. Only two species of flying foxes (Pteropus giganteus and Pteropus hypomelanus) are native to the archipelago.

Cats, rats, mice and Asian house shrews have been introduced by humans, often invading the uninhabited areas of islands and becoming pests.

Bringing dogs and pigs to the Maldives is strictly forbidden.

In the ocean surrounding the islands there are several species of whales and dolphins. Occasionally stray seals from sub-Antarctic waters have been recorded on the islands.

== Invertebrates ==
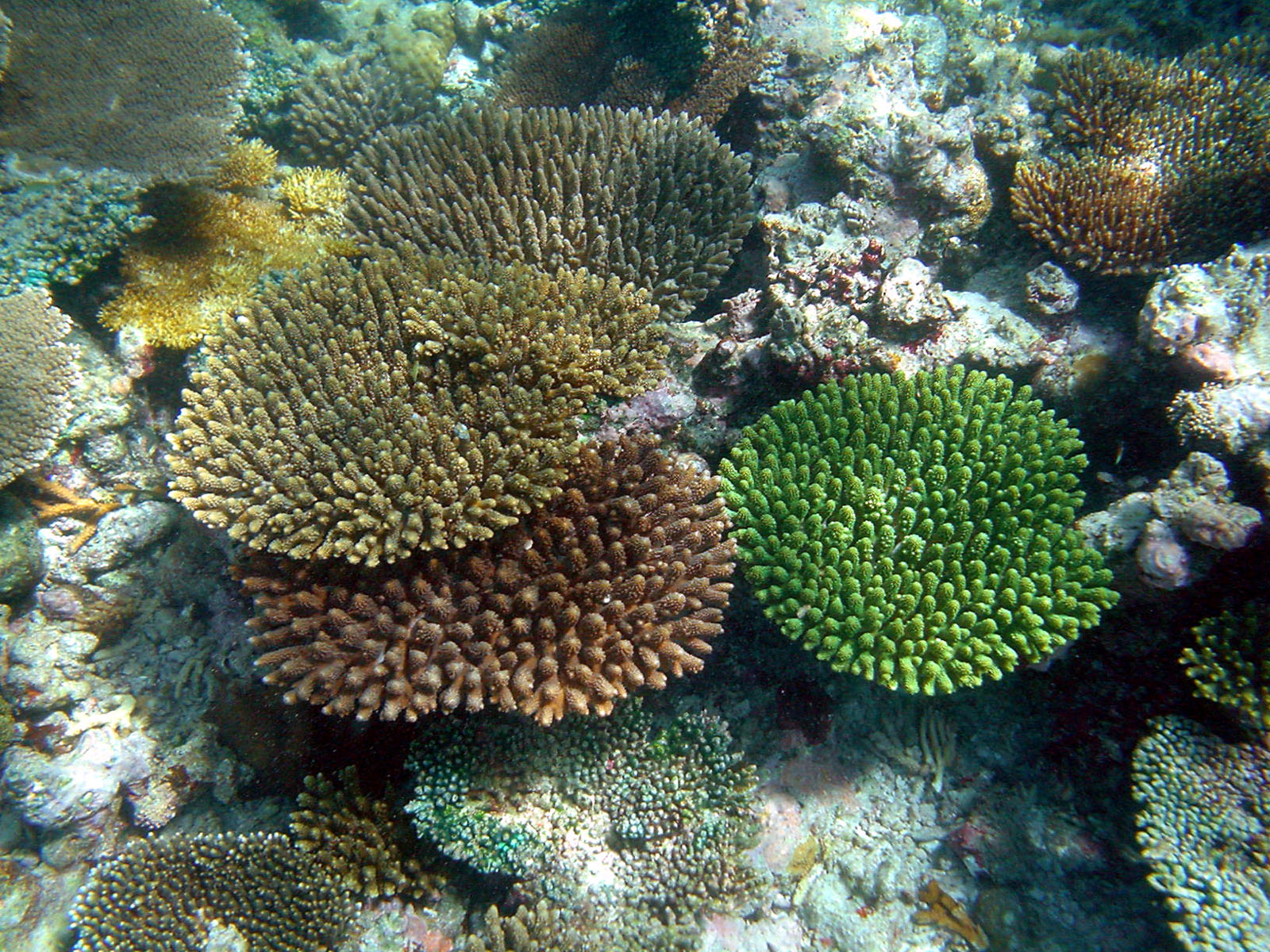
Live coral, Madoogali reef

=== Cnidarians ===
The islands of the Maldives themselves have been built by the massive growth of coral, a colony of living polyps beings. There are also many kinds of sea anemones and jellyfish in Maldivian waters.

=== Arthropods ===
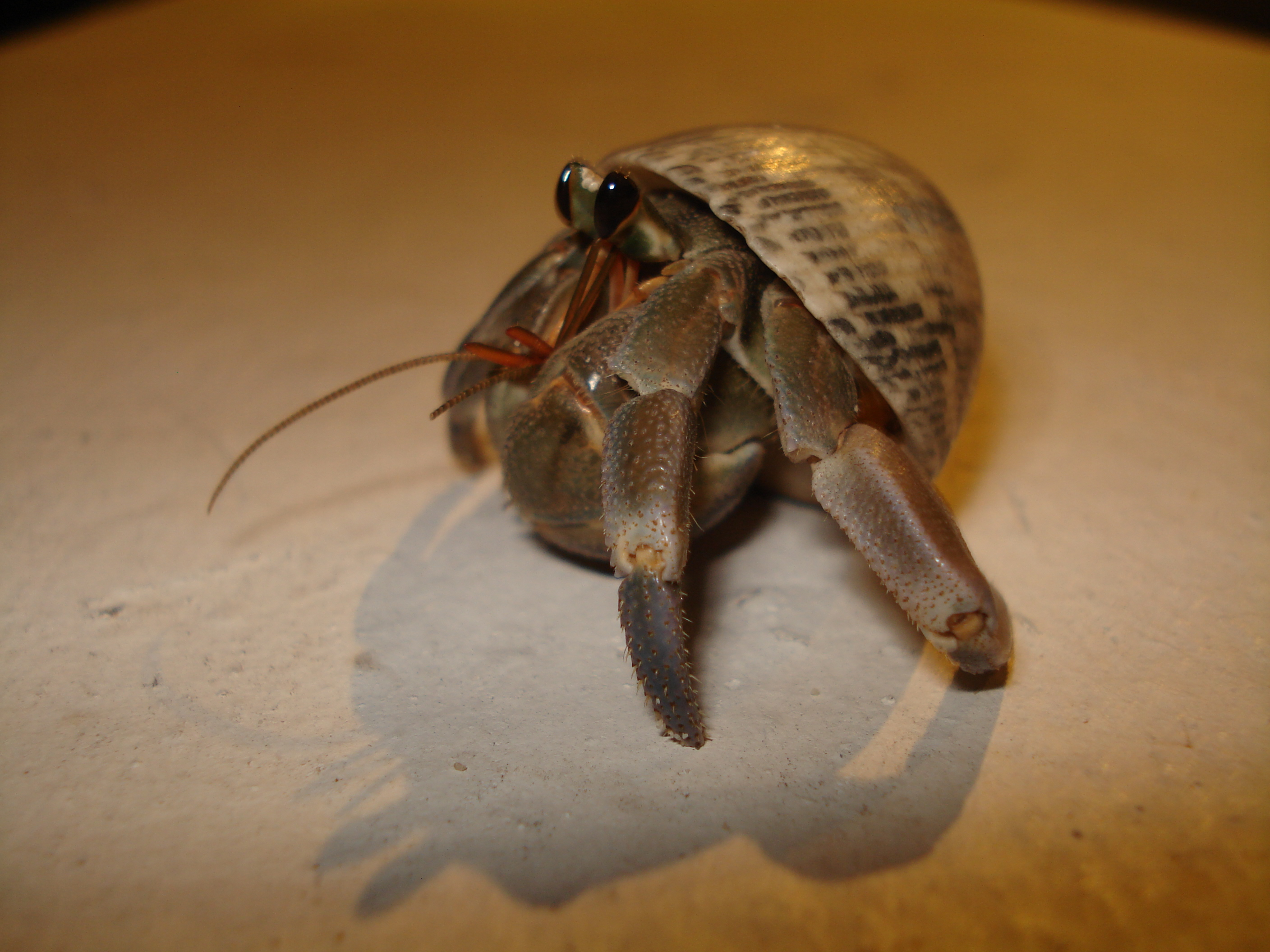

There are four species of lobsters and many species of crabs in the Maldives. Some crabs live in the water, but many, like the ghost crab, live on the beach burrowing holes in the sand by the waterline. Fiddler crabs are common on muddy reef shelves.

Land crabs, like the hermit crab, live under the leaves of shore bushes. Some are domestic pests, living in holes in houses.

Some prawns and shrimp live near the islands but are not fished commercially.

There is a kind of centipede, as well as millipedes, and a small scorpion.

Several species of spiders are found in the Maldives. Spiders exhibit remarkable affinity with those found in the southwestern coast of Indian mainland and Sri Lanka. A pioneering work on spiders of the Maldives was conducted by Reginald Innes Pocock in 1904 in the work Fauna and Geography of Maldives. A few common spiders include the brown huntsman spider (Heteropoda venatoria), Plexippus paykulli, Argiope anasuja, and lynx spiders, and black widows are very occasionally seen on Hulhumalé island and Malé International Airport.

=== Mollusks ===
Octopuses, squids, and clams are common on Maldivian reefs. The giant clam (Tridacna gigas) is common on the reef shelf.

=== Echinoderms ===
The Maldive reefs teem with starfish, brittle stars, and sea urchins. Sea cucumbers are now a source of income, being exported to east Asian markets, however, they were not traditionally fished locally. Recently sea cucumbers have been over harvested in the Maldives, most probably by illegal poaching.

== See also ==
- List of mammals of the Maldives
- List of birds of the Maldives
- Marine wildlife of Baa Atoll

== Sources ==
- Agassiz, A.E. (1903). The Coral Reefs of the Maldives. Cambridge, UK: Mus. Camp. Zool.: Mem.
- "Prof. Agassiz' expedition to the Maldives". The Geographical Journal. 1902.
