= Marine wildlife of Baa Atoll =

Marine wildlife of Baa Atoll (Maldives)

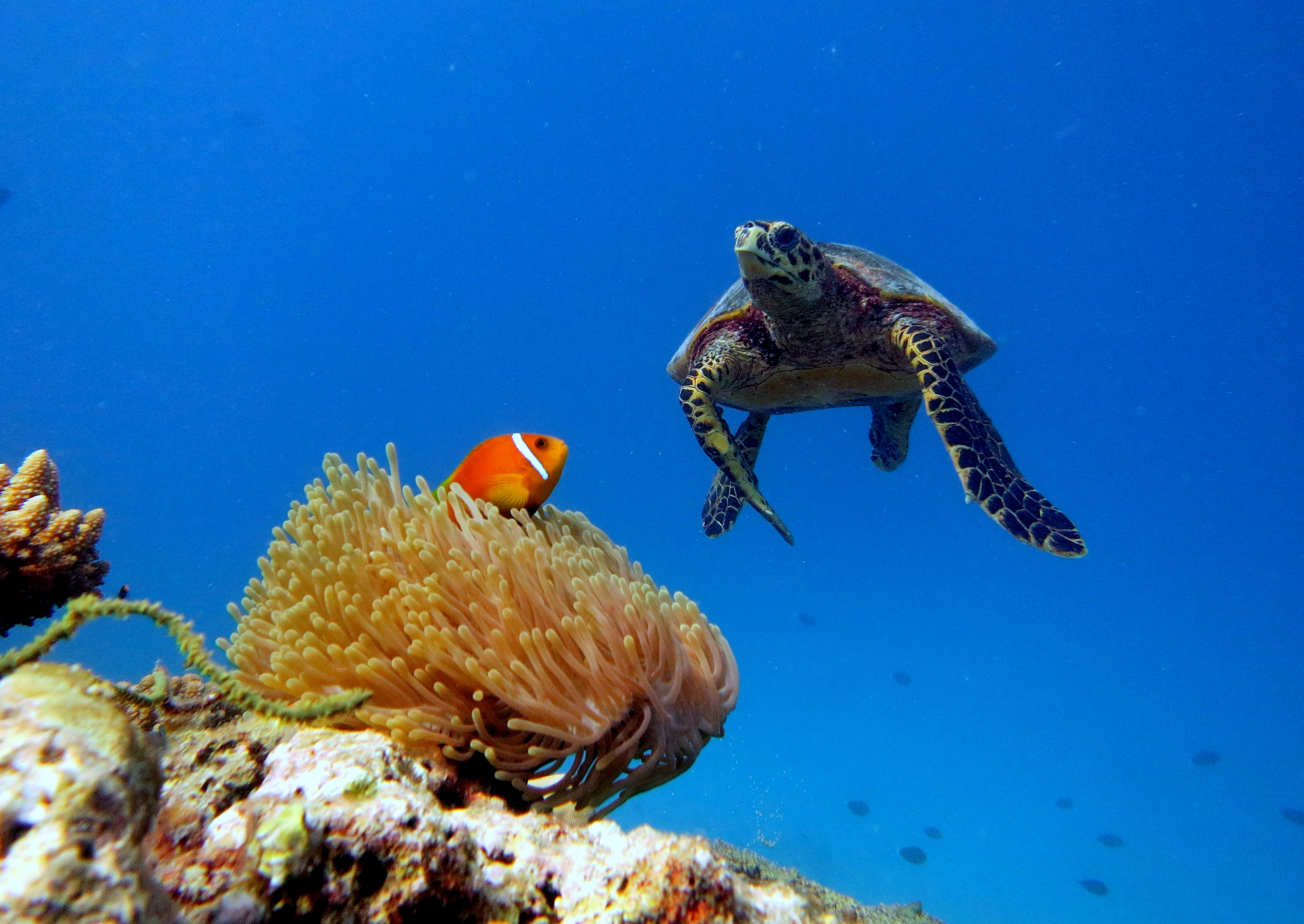
Underwater landscape at Baa Atoll, showing a hawksbill turtle and a Maldivian clownfish in its anemone

The marine wildlife of Baa Atoll consists of marine species living in a circular archipelago in the Maldives, inside the administrative division of Baa Atoll, which is the southern part of Maalhosmadulu Atoll. Baa Atoll was named a biosphere reserve by UNESCO in 2011.

The whole is approximately 38 km by 46 km, covering a surface of 1,127 km^{2}. However, the atoll shelters only 5.5 km^{2} of emerged land, consisting of sandy islands not higher than 3.19 m, and of which half do not exceed an area of 10 hectares. The administrative subdivision of Baa, shelters 11,910 inhabitants, distributed on 13 of the 75 islands, 8 other islands being island resorts; the capital is Eydhafushi.

The archipelago has been located inside the UNESCO Biosphere reserve since 2011. Its shallow waters, particularly rich in coral and fish as well as turtles and dolphins, make a favored place for seaside and underwater tourism.

The ecosystem is characterized by a very high rate of coral cover, highly diverse and dominated by table, digitate and branched corals of the genus Acropora. The shallow waters of this atoll and its particular richness in corals and fish have made it a destination for underwater tourism. The presence of huge animals such as manta rays and whale sharks add spectacular encounters to the beauty of the place. Scientific studies suggest that the faunistic composition can vary greatly between neighbor atolls, especially in terms of benthic fauna.

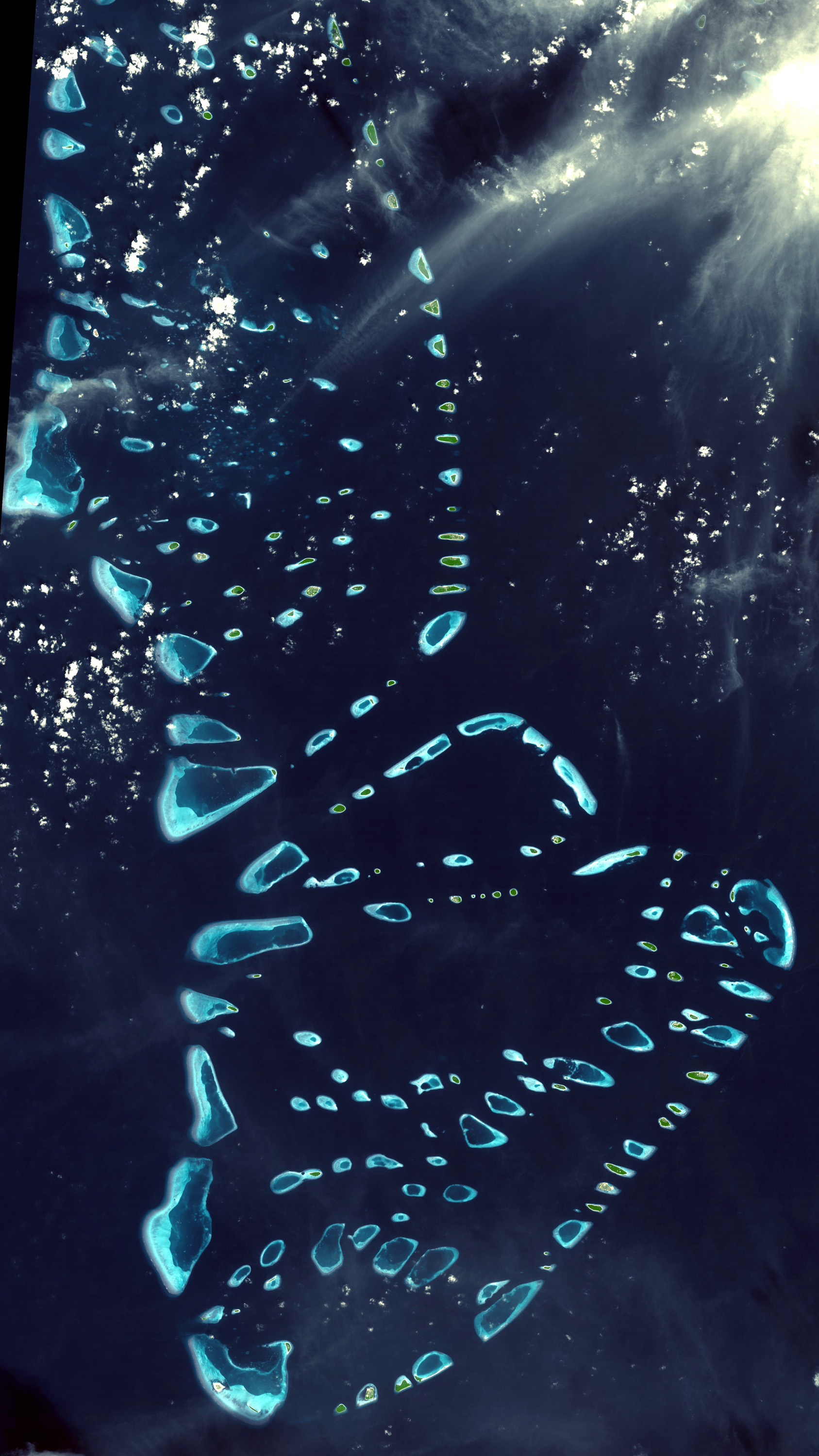
The Maalhosmadulu Atolls seen from space. The Southern Maalhosmadulu Atoll and Fasdūtherē Atoll (centre) make up Baa Atoll.

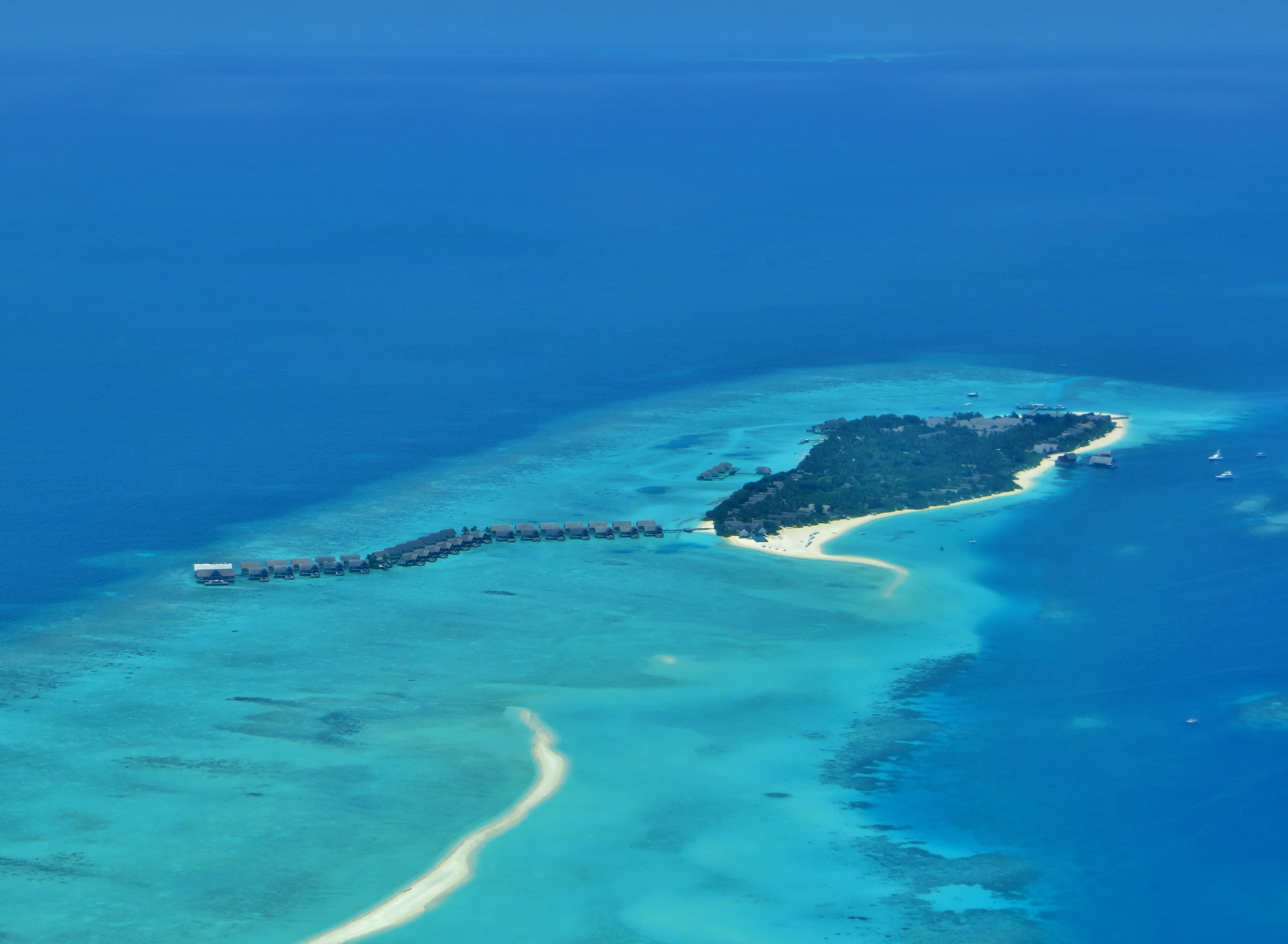
A view of the island of Landaa Giraavaru, including the Four Seasons resort.

== See also ==
- Coral reef
- Maldives
- Baa Atoll Biosphere Reserve

== Sources ==
=== Main scientific reference ===
- Andréfouët, Serge, ed. (2012). "Biodiversity, resources, and conservation of Baa atoll (Republic of Maldives) : a UNESCO Man and Biosphere Reserve". Atoll Research Bulletin: 247. hdl:10088/18292. ISSN 0077-5630.

=== Bibliography ===
- Jen Veron, Corals of the world, Townsville, Australie, ed. Mary Stafford-Smith, 2000 (ISBN 0 642 32236 8).
- E. Lieske et R.F. Myers, Guide des poissons des récifs coralliens, Lausanne, Delachaux et Niestlé, 1994, 400 p. (ISBN 2-603-00982-6).
- Rudie H. Kuiter, Photo guide to fishes of the Maldives, Apollo Bay, Atoll, 1998, 257 p. (ISBN 1 876410 18 3).
- Neville Coleman, Marine life of the Maldives, Apollo Bay, Atoll, 2004, 257 p. (ISBN 1 876410 54 X).

=== Databases ===
- FishBase
- DORIS
- Marine Species Identification Portal

==== Taxonomic databases and references ====
- World Register of Marine Species
- Catalog of Fishes
- ITIS
- Sea Life Base
