= Baa Atoll Biosphere Reserve =

Biosphere reserve in Maldives since 2011

Coordinates: 5.1333°N 72.9500°E

The Baa Atoll Biosphere Reserve is located in the central western part of the Maldives in the Indian Ocean. The atoll is situated just north of the Kashidhoo Kandhoo channel, which geographically divides the northern chain of atolls. It supports one of the largest groups of coral reefs in the Indian Ocean, and acts as a stepping stone for the transport of planktonic larvae of reef organisms from the western and eastern Indian Ocean. The reserve is home to a globally significant biodiversity among its numerous reefs and demonstrates a long history of human interaction with the environment.

== Ecological characteristics ==
Baa Atoll has a warm and humid tropical climate. The weather is dominated by two monsoon periods – a rainy monsoon period, which lasts from May to November, and a dry monsoon period, which lasts from January to March. The dominant natural environment of the reserve is marine, surrounded by deep ocean. The water depth varies considerably and includes lagoons with depths ranging from 30 m to 80 m, opening into the Indian Ocean, while channels running through the atoll may be up to 250–300 m in depth. The lagoons enclose a variety of reef structures including faros, micro-atolls, patch reefs and knolls.

The main habitat types found in the reserve are coral reefs, islands, sea grass beds and mangroves. Coral reefs are the most important habitat type in terms of area as well as biodiversity. Maldivian coral reefs are home to the richest diversity in the region and are the seventh largest in the world, accounting for 5% of the world's reef area.

The coral reefs support a high diversity of reef animals, including approximately 250 species of corals (stony and soft corals) and 1,200 reef and reef-associated fish species, a population of marine turtles, manta rays (Manta birostris), whale sharks (Rhincodon typus) and seabirds. These also include threatened and endangered species such as the green turtle (Chelonia mydas), hawksbill turtle (Eretmochelys imbricata), Napoleon wrasses (Cheilinus undulatus), and tawny nurse shark (Nebrius ferrugineus).

== Socioeconomic characteristics ==
The Baa Atoll Biosphere Reserve comprises 75 islands, 13 of which are inhabited by a population of approximately 12,000 people. The present population in the Maldives is culturally homogeneous, although the original population came from a varied ethnic mix of Indo-Aryan, Dravidian, Sinhalese and Arab origin.

The most important human activities in the area are tourism and fisheries. While resorts have become the main economic driver, tuna and reef fishing remain an important activity. Production of handicrafts and other materials for the tourist industry is also significant. Six islands have been developed as resorts for tourism and more than 350,000 tourists now visit the area each year.

== Sources ==
This article incorporates text from a free content work (license statement/permission). Text taken from UNESCO - MAB Biosphere Reserves Directory, UNESCO, UNESCO.
