= List of first families of the Maldives =

Family of the president of the Maldives

The first family of the republic of the Maldives is the family of the President of the Maldives. The President of the Maldives is the Head of State and the Head of Government.

The current First family of the Maldives is Family of Mohamed Muizzu, it is the current first family of the Maldives since 17 November 2023.

== First families ==
No.	Family	President & First Lady	Children	Term in office	Notes
1	Family of Mohamed Amin Didi	Mohamed Amin Didi & Fathimath Saeed	Ameena Mohamed Amin	January 1, 1953 — August 21, 1953	
2	Family of Ibrahim Nasir	Ibrahim Nasir & Naseema Mohamed	Ahmed Nasir; Ali Nasir; Muhammad Nasir; Aishath Nasir; Ismail Nasir	November 11, 1968 — November 11, 1978	President Nasir was also married to other women, Aishath Zubair and Mariyam Saeed
3	Family of Maumoon Abdul Gayoom	Maumoon Abdul Gayoom & Nasreena Ibrahim (Married 1969)	Ahmed Faris Maumoon; Dunya Maumoon; Yumna Maumoon; Mohamed Ghassan Maumoon	November 11, 1978 — November 11, 2008	
4	Family of Mohamed Nasheed	Mohamed Nasheed & Laila Ali Abdulla (Divorce 2013)	Meera Laila Nasheed; Zaya Laila Nasheed	November 11, 2008 — February 7, 2012	
5	Family of Mohamed Waheed Hassan	Mohamed Waheed Hassan & Ilham Hussain	Widhadh Waheed; Fidha Waheed; Salim Waheed	February 7, 2012 — November 17, 2013	
6	Family of Abdulla Yameen	Abdulla Yameen & Fathimath Ibrahim	Zeine Abdulla Yameen and 2 more	November 17, 2013 — November 17, 2018	Yameen's son Zain is the legal founder of Yameen's new party, People's National Front.
7	Family of Ibrahim Mohamed Solih	Ibrahim Mohamed Solih & Fazna Ahmed	Yaman Solih; Sarah Solih	November 17, 2018 — November 17, 2023	
8	Family of Mohamed Muizzu	Mohamed Muizzu & Sajidha Mohamed (Married 2003)	Yasmine Mohamed Muizzu; Umair Mohamed Muizzu; Zaid Mohamed Muizzu	November 17, 2023 — Present	

== See also ==
- List of Maldivian presidents by age
- President of the Maldives
- Politics of the Maldives
- History of the Maldives
- List of sultans of the Maldives
- List of head of state of the Maldives
- Prime Minister of the Maldives
- Vice President of the Maldives
- First Lady of the Maldives
- Second Lady of the Maldives
