= Family of Mohamed Amin Didi =

Maldivian descended family

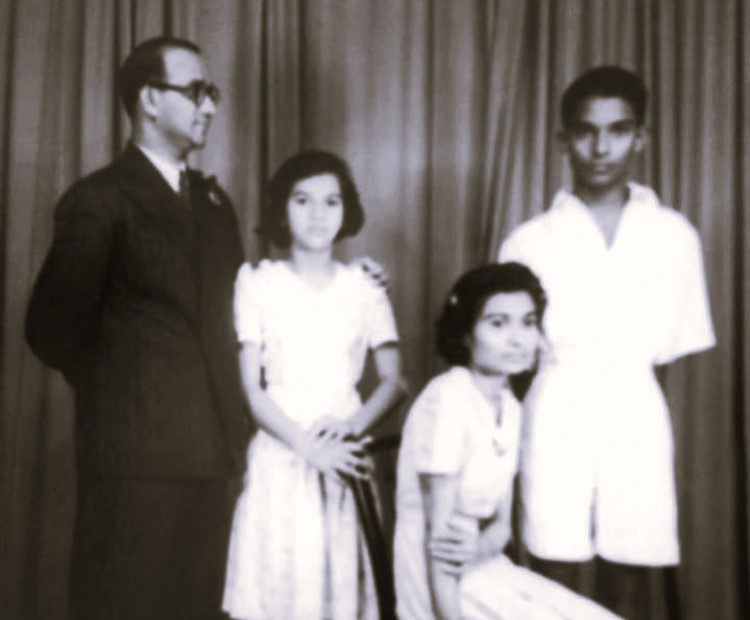
- L–R: Amin, Saeed, Ameena, Saeed's younger brother
- Country: Maldives
- Current region: Malé
- Origin: Malé, Maldive Islands
- Founder: Mohamed Amin Didi
- Members: Mohamed Amin Didi; Fathimath Saeed; Ameena Mohamed Amin
- Connected members: Abdul Majeed Mahir; Farahanaz Faizal; Ameen Faisal
- Connected families: Salahuddin family

The family of Mohamed Amin Didi is a Maldivian descended family that are active in law, education, and politics. The immediate family of Mohamed Amin Didi was the first family of the Maldives from his inauguration in January 1953 until his assassination in August 1953.

Mohamed Amin Didi was the first president of the Maldives during the First Republic of the Maldives before the country went back to the constitutional monarchy.

== Immediate family ==
=== Fathimath Saeed ===
Fathimath Saeed was a Maldivian poet who served as the first lady of the Maldives from January 1953 to August 1953 when her husband Mohamed Amin Didi was overthrown.

=== Ameena Mohamed Amin ===
Ameena Mohamed Amin (Dhivehi: އަމީނާ މުޙައްމަދު އަމީން) was a Maldivian politician and former parliamentarian who served as the President's Member of the People's Majlis. She is the only daughter of Mohamed Amin Didi and Fathimath Saeed.

== Other relations ==
=== Fathimath Saeed's parents ===
Saeed's parents were Hussain Salahuddin, a famous Maldivian poet and scholar and Tuttu Goma.

=== Farahanaz Faizal ===
Farahanaz Faizal (Dhivehi: ފަރަޙްނާޒް ފައިޞަލް) is a Maldivian diplomat who served as the Ambassador of the Maldives to the United Kingdom from 2009 to 2012 and 2019 to 2014. She is the daughter of Amin's daughter, Ameena Mohamed Amin.

=== Ameen Faisal ===
Ameen Faisal is a Maldivian politician who served as the Minister of Defence and National Security from 2008 to 2010. He's the son of Ameena Mohamed Amin.
