= Maldivian presidential assassination attempts =

- Maumoon Abdul Gayoom: 1980, 1983, 1988, 2008
- Mohamed Nasheed: 2021
- Abdulla Yameen: 2015

Maldivian presidential assassination attempts have been numerous, ranging from the early twentieth century since the establishment of the first republic of the Maldives. In 1980, President Maumoon Abdul Gayoom was first Maldivian president to experience an assassination attempt, when three attempts were made to overthrow Maumoon's government and assassinate the president.

There have been attempted assassinations on three different presidents: Maumoon Abdul Gayoom (1980, 1983, 1988, 2008). President Maumoon escaped unharmed from an assassination attempt at Hoarafushi. Mohamed Murshid, a twenty-year-old man from the island, attempted to stab him with a knife concealed in a Maldivian Flag. Former president, Abdulla Yameen Abdul Gayoom escaped a blast, allegedly planned by his vice president, Ahmed Adeeb. President Nasheed was hurt by a bomb attack near his private residence, Galolhu Kenereege. The first president, Mohamed Amin Didi, was banished to Dhoonidhoo, causing him to die.

Attempts to assassinate Maldivian presidents have been largely unsuccessful. Perpetrators have usually been arrested and prosecuted, but some remain at large.

== Presidents assassinated ==
=== Mohamed Amin ===
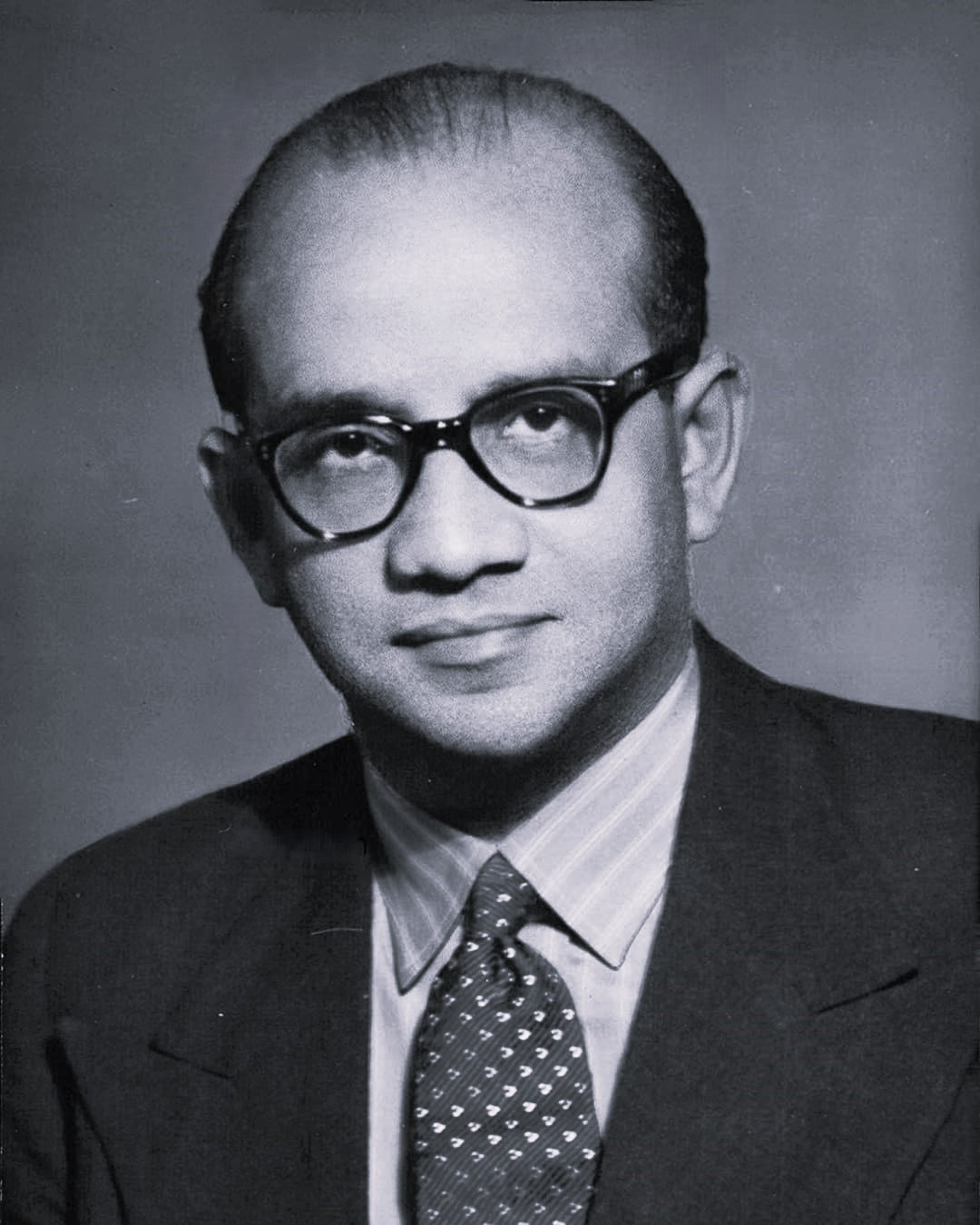
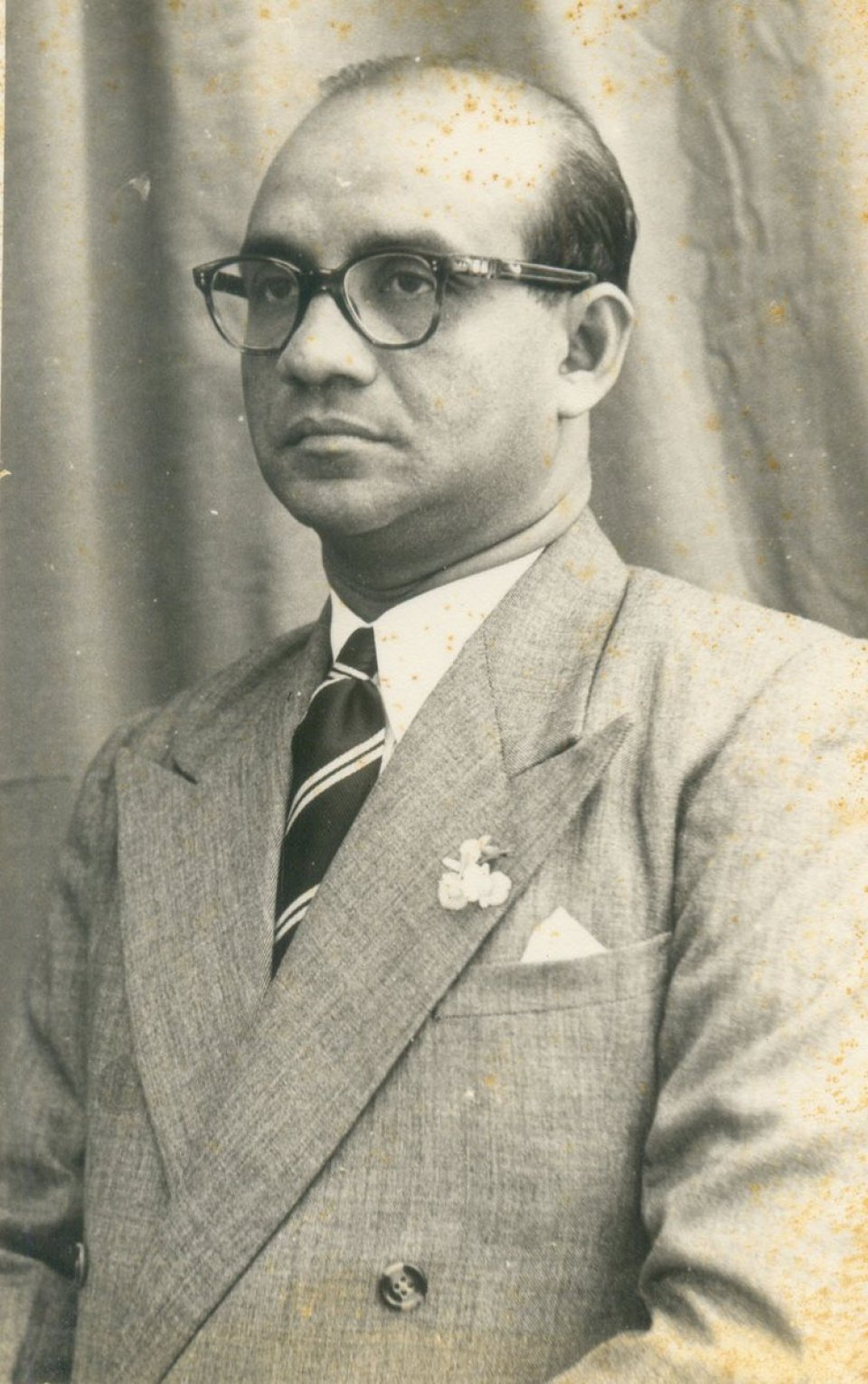

The citizens of Malé appointed Velaanaagey Ibrahim Didi, President Mohamed Amin Didi's vice president, as the head of government of the newly established republic in 1953. Despite warnings to stay away, Amin Didi returned to the Maldives aboard a Catalina aircraft. Upon his arrival, for his own protection, he was escorted to Dhoonidhoo island, where he was placed under government supervision, albeit with the dignity befitting a former head of state.

After spending four months on Dhoonidhoo, clandestine correspondence between Amin Didi and Ibrahim Hilmy Didi surfaced, proposing to overthrow the revolutionary government and reinstate the monarchy, with Ibrahim Hilmy as king and Amin as Prime Minister. In a daring move, Amin Didi attempted to seize control of Bandeyrige one night in Malé, provoking such fury among the populace that he narrowly escaped being lynched. Subsequently, he was cast adrift in a small boat near Malé. (Note: Some people argue that they banished Amin Didi for the purpose of killing him.)

In the aftermath, Amin Didi, Ibrahim Hilmy Didi, and Shamsuddin Hilmy, among others, were brought to trial for their roles in the rebellion. They were ultimately sentenced to exile: Mohamed Amin to Kaafu Atoll, Gaafaru; Ibrahim Hilmy to K. Gulhi; and Shamsuddin Hilmy to K. Himmafushi.

As Amin Didi's health declined, he was transferred to Vihamanaafushi Island where he died on January 19, 1954. A funeral was conducted in his honor.

== Wounded presidents and attempts ==
=== Maumoon Abdul Gayoom ===
On 8 January 2008, then-president, Maumoon Abdul Gayoom was visiting Hoarafushi in Haa Alif Atoll. Mohamed Murshid, a man aged twenty hailing from the island, made an attempt to stab then—president of the Maldives and Asia's longest-serving president, Maumoon Abdul Gayoom, using a knife concealed within a Maldives flag. However, his effort was thwarted when Mohamed Jaisham Ibrahim, a sixteen—year—old boy scout from Kudahuvadhoo island, intervened, blocking the attack with his own hands. Unfortunately, Jaisham sustained injuries during his courageous act and required medical treatment. He was later treated at Indira Gandhi Memorial Hospital. Reportedly, the attacker, Murshid tried to stab the president's stomach.

Aftermath, addressing the people of Hoarafushi, President Gayoom expressed his regrets over injuries sustained by Jaisham in the incident and said;

By the grace of Almighty Allah, I am well and safe, but severe injuries have been inflicted on to brave young man of this island, that is Mohamed Jaisham, he is a very person, a true hero, I sincerely thank him and his family and I pray to Almighty Allah to grant him speedy recovery.

— Maumoon Abdul Gayoom

Further, he said "I would like to assure the people of Maldives, that by the grace of Almighty Allah, that I will remain steadfast in the service of the people, my resolve will not be deterred by such acts, I will continue to discharge the responsibilities the people of the country entrusted me with and I would like assure all that if I am elected again to serve as the President that I will continue to work for the people in the resolve".

After the assault, Murushid was apprehended and later convicted to a twelve-year term for perpetrating a premeditated attack on an incumbent president, along with an additional year for attempting violence with a sharp object.

Coups d'état

In the 1980s, Maumoon's government faced three attempted overthrows and assassination plots. The initial attempt occurred in 1980, followed by another in 1983. However, it was the third attempt in 1988 that proved successful in seizing control of the capital city and numerous government establishments. The coup against Maumoon's regime in the Maldives was thwarted by the intervention of the Indian Armed Forces, initiated upon his request.

On the night of 2 November 1988, President Maumoon Abdul Gayoom was drafting a speech for Republic Day on 11 November, after cancelling a planned visit. Meanwhile, First Lady Nasreena Ibrahim was indulging their son Mohamed Ghassan Maumoon's stamp-collecting hobby. Around 1:30 AM, they slept for the night. Two hours later, they were startled by a loud noise. President Maumoon inquired, mistaking it for thunder, but Nasreena suspected gunfire or an explosion, attributing it to fireworks in a nearby garage.

Staying at the Theemuge presidential residence, they were alerted by security that terrorists were attacking the Maldives Security Service building. Attempting to leave in the presidential motorcade, they were advised to return due to the ongoing attack. Proceeding on foot, they encountered a Tamil terrorist wielding a gun. Nasreena and Ghassan shielded the president, as many were unfamiliar with her appearance.

Seeking refuge in Nasreena's childhood neighborhood, they knocked on several doors for shelter. Finally welcomed into the home of Ghassan's friend at Gulistaange, they contacted government officials and sought assistance from India, the United States, and other countries. Indian forces executed "Operation Cactus," rescuing the first family and quelling the attack.

=== Abdulla Yameen ===
On 28 September 2015, President Abdulla Yameen Abdul Gayoom and his spouse, then-first lady, Fathimath Ibrahim, were travelling from Ibrahim Nasir International Airport to Malé, after they had been to the hajj pilgrimage in Saudi Arabia. the couple were travelling at the official speedboat of the president. (Note: (Finifenmaa boat)) The assassination attempt of president Abdulla Yameen left the president unhurt, however, the first lady Fathimath Ibrahim, with spine injuries, and a wounded presidential secretary and a bodyguard.

The explosion on the Finifenmaa boat was detected as it approached the landing point at the presidential boat jetty. Shortly after the assassination attempt, rumors circulated implicating Vice President Ahmed Adeeb. Authorities labeled the incident as "it was on purpose to kill the president". later, President Yameen apprehended two high-ranking police officers. This came on the heels of the president dismissing his defense minister a week prior.

Avatar of Umar Naseer

Umar Naseer
(@UmarNaseerMV)
tweeted:

VP Adheeb under arrest and held in Dhoonidhoo Detention.

12:46 PM Oct 24, 2015

Adeeb was arrested by Maldives Police and jailed in Dhoonidhoo on 24 October 2015, in connection with the attempted assassination of president Abdulla Yameen. Adeeb was removed from office as vice president by a no confidence vote from the People's Majlis, with an overwhelming majority.

=== Mohamed Nasheed ===
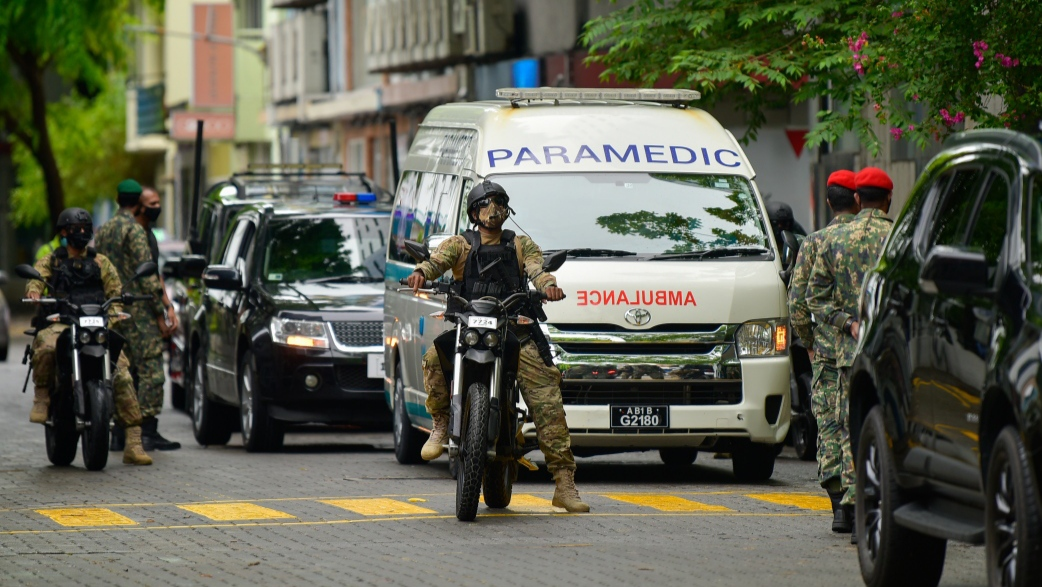
President Nasheed flown in to Germany

On May 6, 2021, there was an attempt on the life of the then-Maldivian Speaker of the People's Majlis and former president Mohamed Nasheed near his residence in Malé. At 20:39 MVT (UTC+5), a homemade explosive device planted on a parked motorcycle detonated, injuring Nasheed and four others. Maldivian authorities have labeled it as a terrorist attack by religious extremists. Three suspects, all with previous criminal records, have been apprehended, though they deny any involvement.

The blast happened on May 6, 2021, as Nasheed was entering his car. He suffered injuries and underwent surgery at ADK Hospital. Additionally, two of Nasheed's bodyguards and two bystanders, including a British national, were injured. No group has claimed responsibility for the attack.

Police Commissioner Mohamed Hameed stated that 450 officers were deployed for investigation, with two experts from the Australian Federal Police joining the inquiry. This marked the second instance of Australian assistance following a 2015 investigation into an alleged assassination attempt on then-President Abdulla Yameen's speedboat. Additionally, officials from the United Nations Office on Drugs and Crime and the United States Department of State offered support. Close sources to Nasheed's Maldivian Democratic Party suggested the attack might be linked to his anti-corruption efforts.

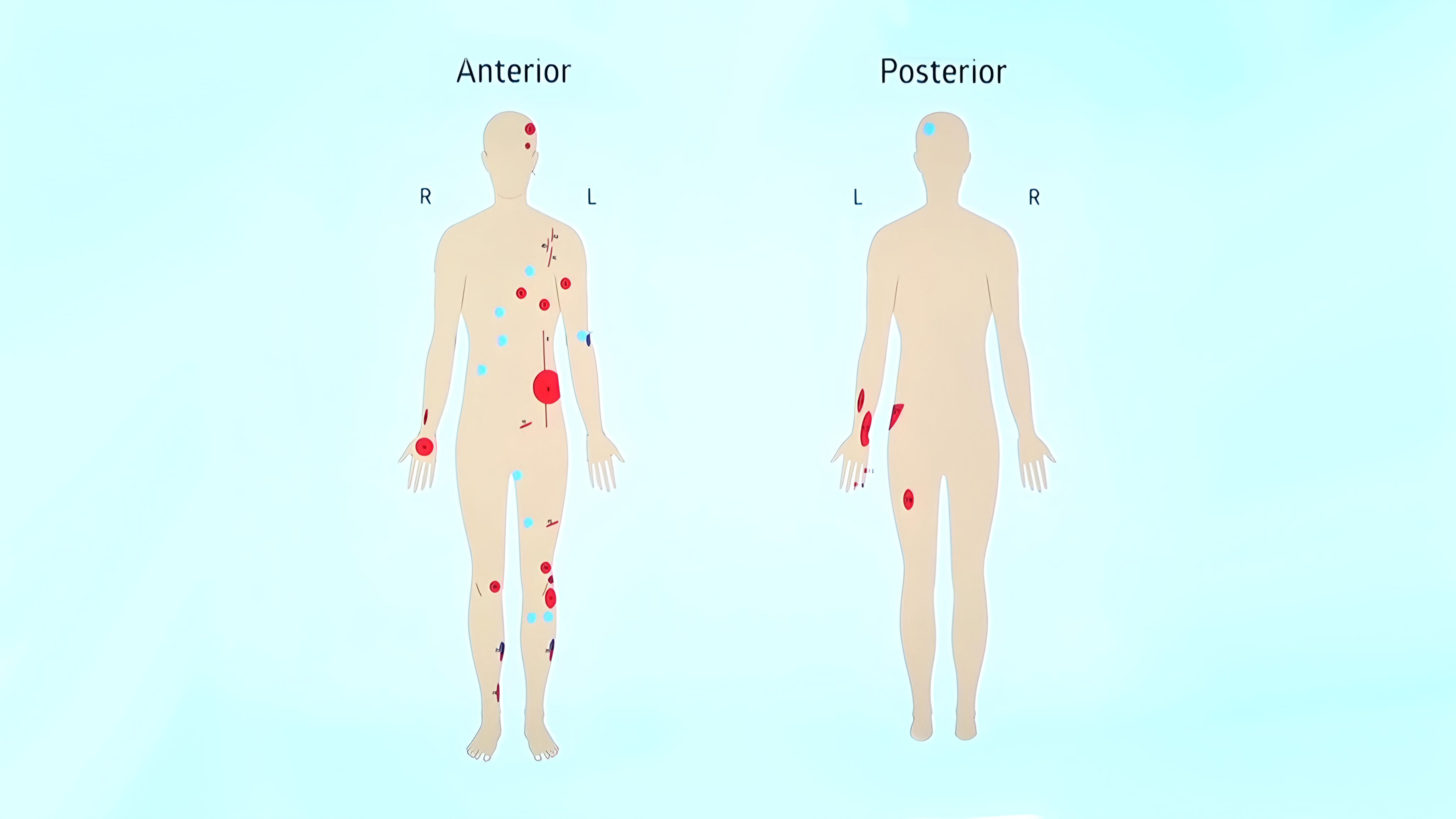
Injuries on president Nasheed

On May 9, 2021, Maldivian police announced the arrest of the "prime suspect" and two accomplices based on video footage, while still searching for others. The police attributed the attack to "religious extremists," although the arrested suspects denied involvement, each having prior criminal records. Simultaneously, the Parliamentary Committee on National Security Services initiated an inquiry into the breach of Nasheed's security. On May 10, President Solih disclosed the formation of a special team within the Prosecutor General's Office to handle the court case.

Nasheed underwent a 16-hour surgery to address injuries to his head, chest, abdomen, and limbs, with surgeons successfully removing multiple pieces of shrapnel, including one dangerously close to his heart. The bomb, as reported by Agence France-Presse, contained ball bearings intended to amplify the damage. By May 8, Nasheed's condition had sufficiently improved to allow him to be removed from life support, although he remained in intensive care. Despite the severity of his injuries, his condition remained stable, and he recuperated after undergoing numerous emergency surgeries. The hospital initially described him as being in critical condition in intensive care on May 7, following the extensive surgical procedures.

On May 13, 2021, Nasheed was transported to Germany for advanced medical care following serious injuries sustained alongside three others. He re-entered the country on October 11, 2021, subsequently resuming his responsibilities as speaker.

== See also ==
- President of the Maldives
- First Lady of the Maldives
- Vice President of the Maldives
- List of Presidents of the Maldives
- List of Vice Presidents of the Maldives
