= Mariyam Saeed =

Maldivian poet and writer (1933–2018)

- މަރިޔަމް ސަޢީދު
- Saeed, c. 1954–1967

2nd First Lady of the Maldives
- In role 11 November 1968 – 31 May 1969
- Preceded by: Fathimath Saeed
- Succeeded by: Naseema Mohamed

Spouse of the prime minister of the Maldives
- In role 12 December 1954 – 11 November 1968
- Prime Minister: Ibrahim Nasir
- Preceded by: Aishath Mohamed Didi
- Succeeded by: Fathimath Ibrahim Didi

Personal details
- Born: 27 March 1933 Malé, Maldive Islands
- Died: 26 April 2018 (aged 85) Colombo, Sri Lanka
- Party: Independent
- Spouse: Ibrahim Nasir (died 2008)
- Relations: Salahuddin family
- Children: 2
- Parents: Hussain Salahuddin (father); Medhuganduvaru Thuththu Gomaa (mother)

Al Nabeela Mariyam Saeed (Dhivehi: މަރިޔަމް ސަޢީދު; 27 March 1933 – 26 April 2018) was a Maldivian poet who was the first lady of the Maldives as the second wife of president Ibrahim Nasir from November 1968 until her husband handed the role to his third wife Naseema Mohamed. From 1954 to 1968, Saeed was also the spouse of the prime minister of the Maldives. Referred to be one of the greatest poets in Maldivian history, she was born into the prominent Salahuddin family, as the daughter of Hussain Salahuddin.

Born into the prominent family of poets, Saeed was educated in Malé. In 1953, she married politician Ibrahim Nasir, with whom she had 2 children. In 1954, she was designated with the title of spouse of the prime minister of the Maldives, when her husband Nasir was appointed prime minister. Later in 1968, after the abolishing of the monarchy, when her husband was proclaimed president, she was the first lady until in the following year her husband married his third wife Naseema Mohamed.

Saeed has been referred to as one of the greatest poets in the history of the Maldives. In 1983, she was awarded presidential award for her services on the poetry.

== Early life ==
Mariyam Saeed was born on 27 March 1933, to Husain Salahuddin and Medhu Gan'duvaru Thuhthu Gomaa. Saeed had four full-siblings, Adnan Hussain, Fathimath Saeed, and Ibrahim Shihab. She was delivered at her father's home in Malé.

Saeed married politician Ibrahim Nasir. They had two children, Ali Nasir and Mohamed Nasir.

== Poetry ==
In her poetry career, Saeed has been referred as the "Nisreen" and "Neel" of the Maldivian poetry garden. She has been described as one of the greatest poets in Maldivian history.

At the age of fourteen, Saeed became a member of the Maldivian Poetry Garden, marking the beginning of a prolific career in poetry. Over the years, she composed an extensive body of work, with the exact number of poems unknown even to her. It is noted, however, that in a single year, she wrote over 50 poems. Her works covered a wide range of themes, including national and historical topics, moral and religious reflections, as well as explorations of various emotions. Some of her poems have been presented under the pseudonyms "Nisreen," "Neel," and "Air."

In 1983, then-president Maumoon Abdul Gayoom presented her National Award of Honour in the area of Maldivian poetry.

== Death ==
On 26 April 2018, after suffering a stroke, Saeed died in Colombo, Sri Lanka. She was buried alongside her father Husain Salahuddin and brother Ibrahim Shihab, at the Kuppiyawatte Muslim Burial Ground in Sri Lanka.

Following her death, messages of condolences were sent by the Maldivian president Abdulla Yameen, Former presidents Maumoon Abdul Gayoom and Mohamed Nasheed, and other politicians, poets and organizations. Upon her death, journalists and politicians described it as "the end of a period of Dhvehi poetry". Habeeba Hussain Habeeb, one of her relatives, said that her poets had different hidden meanings and that she was an incomparable poet.
