= Adnan Hussain (disambiguation) =

Adnan Hussain (born 1989) is a British politician.

Adnan Hussain may also refer to:

- Adnan Hussain (footballer) (born 1985), Emirati footballer
- Adnan Hussain (minister) (fl. 1956–1981), Maldivian politician

== See also ==
- Adnan Hussein (born 1954), Lebanese politician
