= Ameena Mohamed Amin =

Maldivian politician (1935–2020)

- އަމީނާ މުޙައްމަދު އަމީން
- Amin in 2018

President's Member of the People's Majlis
- In office 23 February 1980 – 15 January 1989
- President: Maumoon Abdul Gayoom
- Speaker: Ahmed Shathir; Ibrahim Shihab; Abdulla Hameed

Personal details
- Born: 1935 Athireege, Malé, Maldives
- Died: 6 May 2020 (aged 84–85) Malé, Maldives
- Spouse: Abdul Majeed Mahir (divorced)
- Relations: Family of Mohamed Amin Didi; Salahuddin family
- Children: 4, including Farahanaz Faizal and Ameen Faisal
- Parents: Mohamed Amin Didi (father); Fathimath Saeed (mother)

Al Nabeela Ameena Mohamed Amin (Dhivehi: އަންނަބީލާ އަމީނާ މުޙައްމަދު އަމީން; 1935 – 7 May 2020) was a Maldivian politician who is the daughter of former president, Mohamed Amin Didi, and former poet, Fathimath Saeed.

== Early life ==
Ameena Mohamed Amin was born in 1935 to Mohamed Amin Didi, the 1st president of the Maldives and Fathimath Saeed, a poet.

== Career ==
Amin started her career as deputy principal of Madhrasathul Saniyya (now Aminiya School) from 1955 to 1957. She later became the secretary of Health Ministry from 1961 until 1968, where she was appointed as secretary to the prime minister as well as secretary of prime minister’s Office. She was appointed as an appointed member to the parliament by President Maumoon Abdul Gayoom from 1980-1985. She also served as director of social affairs at the president office, director of social affairs of Ministry of Home Affairs and Social Services, and director of social services of Ministry of Health and Welfare.

== Death ==
Amin died on 6 May 2020 from long term illness. Her death was met with condolences from many Maldivian politicians and presidents. Notables being Ibrahim Mohamed Solih, Abdulla Shahid, and Maumoon Abdul Gayoom.

== Personal life ==
Amin married Abdul Majeed Mahir and had two children with him. Ameen Faisal and Farahanaz Faisal. She had other children, including Ibrahim Faisal and Suweykar Abdul Hameed.
