= Adnan Hussain (minister) =

Maldivian politician

- ޢަދުނާން ޙުސައިން
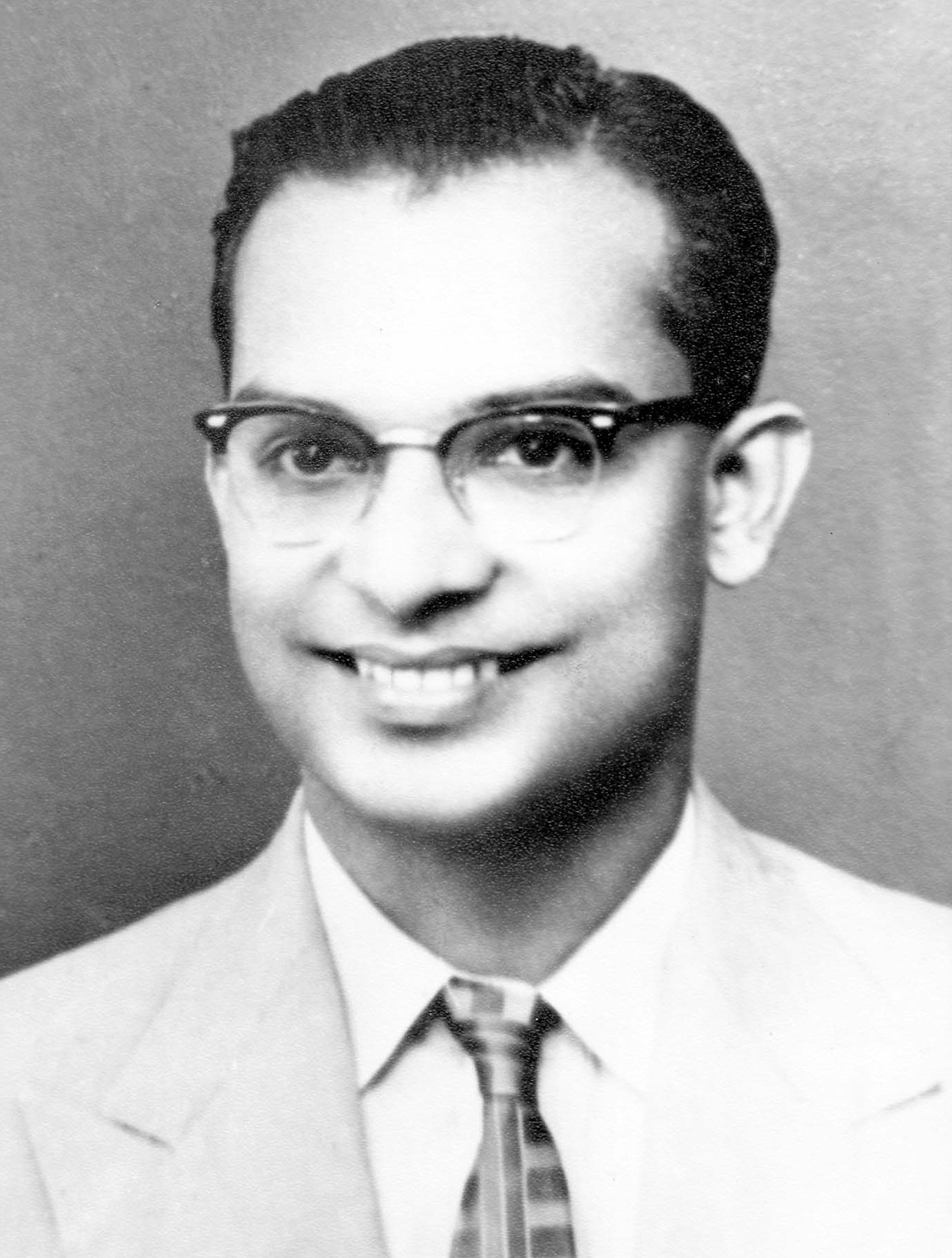
- Official portrait, 1972.

Attorney General
- In office 8 March 1975 – 11 August 1981
- President: Ibrahim Nasir; Maumoon Abdul Gayoom
- Preceded by: Ibrahim Shihab
- Succeeded by: Ahmed Zaki
- In office 26 September 1956 – 01 August 1959
- Monarch: Fareed I
- Prime Minister: Mohamed Amin Didi; Ibrahim Ali Didi
- Preceded by: Mohamed Jameel Didi
- Succeeded by: Ibrahim Shihab

Vazeerul Ma'aarif
- In office 16 August 1972 – 11 November 1968
- President: Ibrahim Nasir
- Preceded by: Hassan Zareer
- Succeeded by: Mohamed Nooruddin

Personal details
- Relations: Salahuddin family
- Children: Ahmed Muthasim Adnan
- Parent: Hussain Salahuddin

Adnan Hussain (Dhivehi: ޢަދުނާން ޙުސައިން) was a Maldivian politician and statesman who held several ministerial positions during the Nasir presidency.

== Life ==
Hussain served as the Vazeerul Ma'aarif (Minister of Education) of the Maldive Islands from 1972 to 1975. He later served as the Attorney General of the Maldives Sultanate from 1956 to 1959 and 1975 to 1981.

He was born into the prominent Salahuddin family as the son of Hussain Salahuddin. His son is Ahmed Muthasim Adnan, the fifth chief justice of the Maldives.
