= Dhoshimeynaa Kilege =

Awarded by the King of the Maldive Islands
- Type: Order
- Status: Discontinued

Statistics
- First induction: 1800s
- Last induction: 1976

The Most Honourable Order of the Distinguished Dhoshimeynaa Kilege or Dhoshimeynaa Kilege, (Dhivehi: ދޮށިމޭނާ ކިލެގެކަން), was the highest order and title awarded by the King of the Maldives.

== Name ==
The term Dhoshimeyna or Dorhimeyna refers to a title conferred by the government during a special ceremony. The word Dhoshimeynakan (the rank of Dhoshimeyna) means a rank of honor which was formerly elevated to the rule of Donimena ward, one of the divided parts of Malé.

== Recipients ==
Recipient	Date	Ref
Hussain Dhoshimeynaa Kilegefan	1856	
Ahmed Didi	Unknown	
Ali Dhoshimeynaa Kilegefan	1882	
Ibrahim Didi	11 August 1885	
Ahmed Dhoshimeynaa Kilegefan	11 August 1885	
Ismail Didi	1900	
Mohamed Amin Didi	30 April 1948	
Abdul Hannan Haleem	1965	

== See also ==
- Ranna Bandeyri Kilegefan
