= Fathimath Saeed =

Maldivian poet and writer (1916–1990)

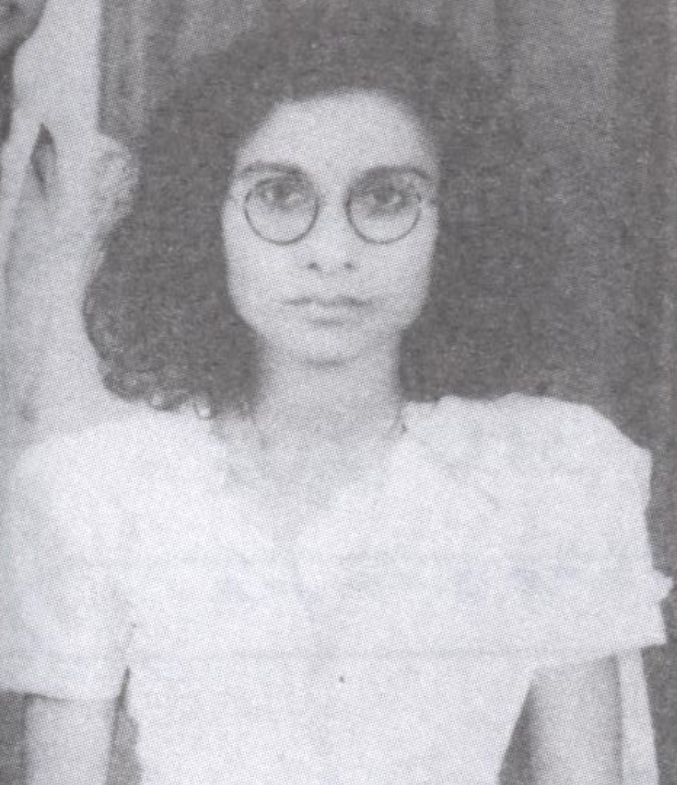
- Saeed c. 1945–1952
- Born: 17 March 1916; Bageechage, Fura Malé, Maldive Islands
- Died: 1990 (aged 73–74); Athireege, Malé, Maldives
- Occupations: Poet, writer
- Political party: Muthagaddim (1951–1953)
- Spouse: Mohamed Amin Didi (m. 1930; died 1954)
- Children: 3, including Ameena Mohamed Amin
- Parents: Husain Salahuddin; Medhuganduvaru Tuttu Goma
- Relatives: Salahuddin family Family of Mohamed Amin Didi

1st First Lady of the Maldives
- In role 1 January 1953 – 21 August 1953
- President: Mohamed Amin Didi
- Preceded by: Office established
- Succeeded by: Mariyam Saeed

Spouse of the Prime Minister of the Maldives
- In role 22 April 1951 – 21 August 1953
- Prime Minister: Mohamed Amin Didi
- Succeeded by: Aminiath Mohamed Didi

Al Nabeela Fathimath Saeed (17 March 1916 – c. 1990) was a Maldivian poet and writer who served as the inaugural first lady of the Maldives from January 1953 to August 1953, as the wife of president Mohamed Amin Didi. She simultaneously served as the spouse of the Prime Minister of the Maldives from April 1951 to August 1953.

Saeed was born in Fura Malé to Hussain Salahuddine, the then–attorney general and a great Maldivian poet and writer. At a young age, she married Amin, the grandson of then–prime minister Ibrahim Dhoshimeynaa Kilegefaan. Their first two sons did not survive infancy—one was stillborn, and the other died at six days old. Their third child, daughter Ameena was the only one who lived throughout Saeed's lifespan. In 1954, Amin died from injuries sustained during an assassination attempt by a mob and to overthrow his government.

In her poetic career, Saeed was one of the greatest women poets in the Maldives and nicknamed "Dhivehi lhenverikamuge gulshanuge narugismaa" (the white rain lily garden of the Maldivian poetry).

== Early life ==
Fathimath Saeed was born on 17 March 1916, to then–attorney general Hussain Salahuddine and his second wife Tuttu Goma. Born into a family of well–known poets, Saeed was the elder sister of influential poets and statesman Ibrahim Shihab, Adnan Hussain and Mariyam Saeed, who was the second wife of president Ibrahim Nasir.

=== Marriage and children ===
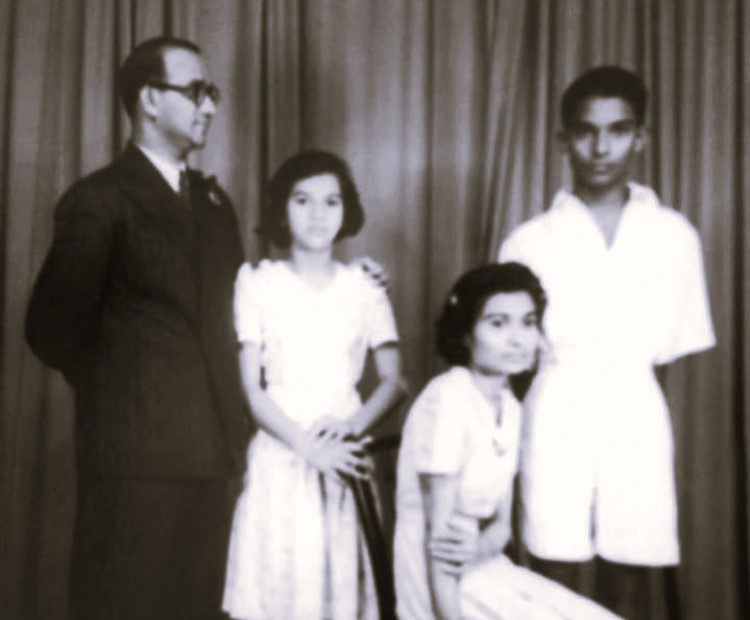
Saeed, along with husband Amin, daughter and brother Adnan

Saeed and Mohamed Amin Didi, who later became the first president of the Maldives and prime minister, married in 1930 and had three children. Their first two sons did not survive infancy—one was stillborn, and the other died at six days old. Their third child and only daughter, Ameena Mohamed Amin, outlived her parents and died in 2020.

== Poetry career ==
Known by her nickname "white rain lily" in her career, Saeed was one of the greatest female poets in the Maldivian history. In 2022, the poets' day of Maldives was celebrated in memory of Saeed.

== Awards ==
- 1982: Honorary Public Service Award in the field of Maldivian poetry.

== Bibliography ==
- Habeeb, Habeeba Hussain (2001). "Dhivehi lhenverikamuge gulshanuge narugismaa Annabeelaa Fathimath Saeed" (PDF). Dhivehi Bahaai Thareekhah Khidhumaikuraa Qaumee Marukazu (Digital Repository of Maldives National University): 8.
