= Order of Ghazi =

Highest national award in the Maldives

Order of the Distinguished Rule of Ghazi

Awarded by: The President of the Maldives
- Type: Order
- Established: 15 August 1952
- Awarded for: Service for the government or the Maldives
- Status: Currently constituted
- Founder: Sultan Muhammad Fareed Didi
- Grades: Collar
- Post-nominals: NGIV

Statistics
- Total inductees: 4

Precedence
- Next (lower): Order of Izzuddin
- Ribbon

Order of the Distinguished Rule of Ghazi (also known as The Most Honourable Order of the Distinguished Rule of Ghazi, or Insignia of the Most Distinguished Order of Ghazi) is the highest national award in the Maldives.

== Recipients ==
The Most Honourable Order of the Distinguished Rule of Ghazi, Nishan Ghazege 'Izzatheri Veriya, the highest-ranked title in the Maldives, was awarded to Queen Elizabeth II in 1972 during her visit to the Maldives. The then Prime Minister Ibrahim Nasir gained the title following his victory as the independence hero of the Maldives. In 2013, President Maumoon was given the Nishan Ghazige 'Izzatheri Veriya title on the independence day celebration.

Recipient	Date	Ref
Mohamed Amin Didi	15 August 1952	
Ibrahim Nasir, Prime Minister of the Maldive Islands until 1968.	9 February 1967	
Elizabeth II, Queen of the United Kingdom and other Commonwealth realms from 1952 to 2022.	13 March 1972	
Maumoon Abdul Gayoom, President of the Maldives from 1978 to 2008.	26 July 2013	
