= Salahuddin family =

Maldivian descended family

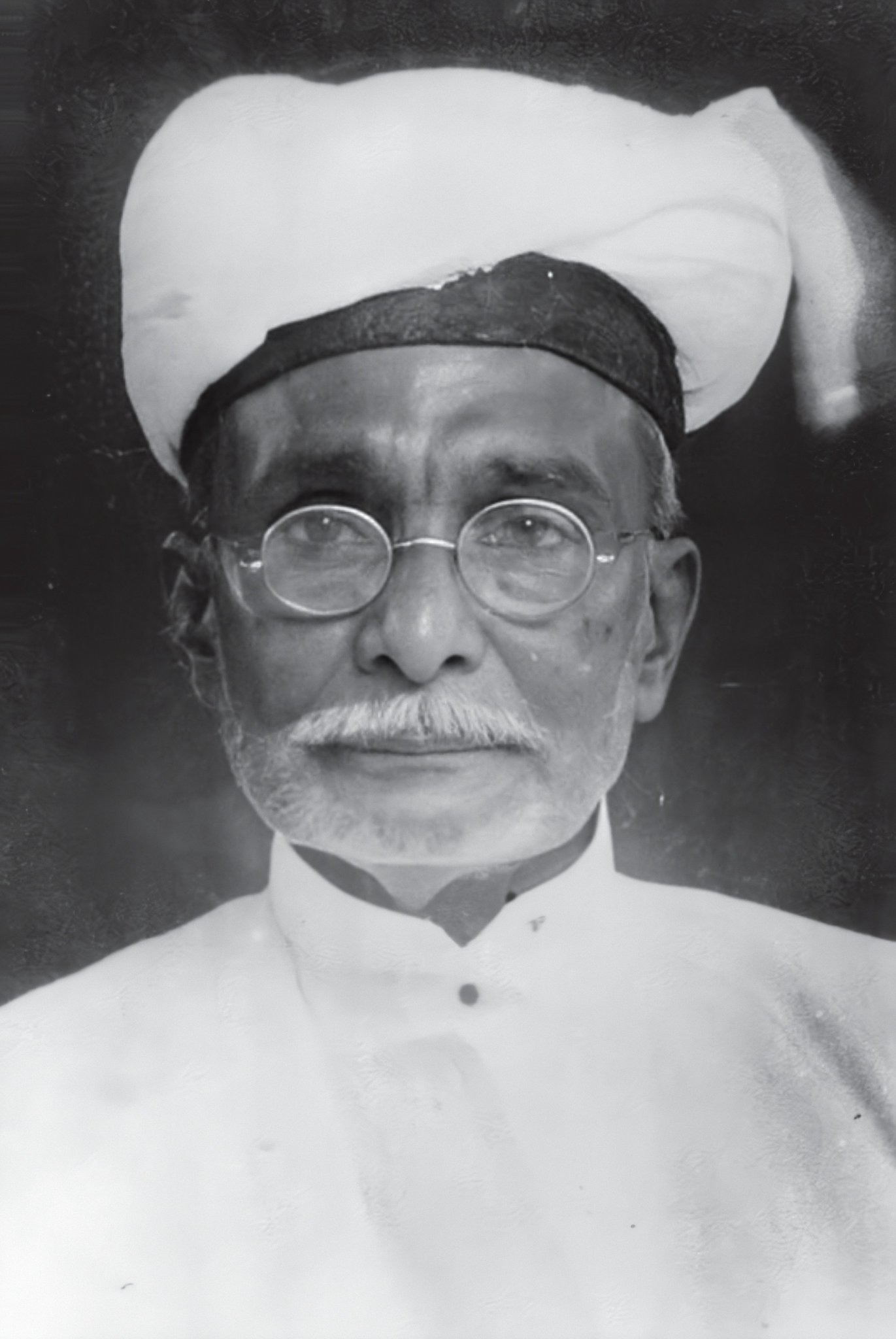
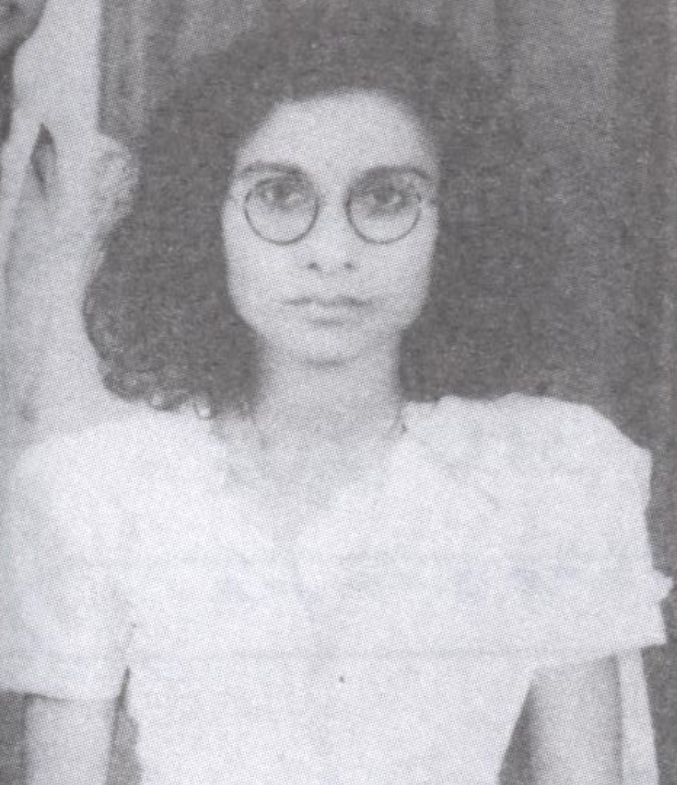
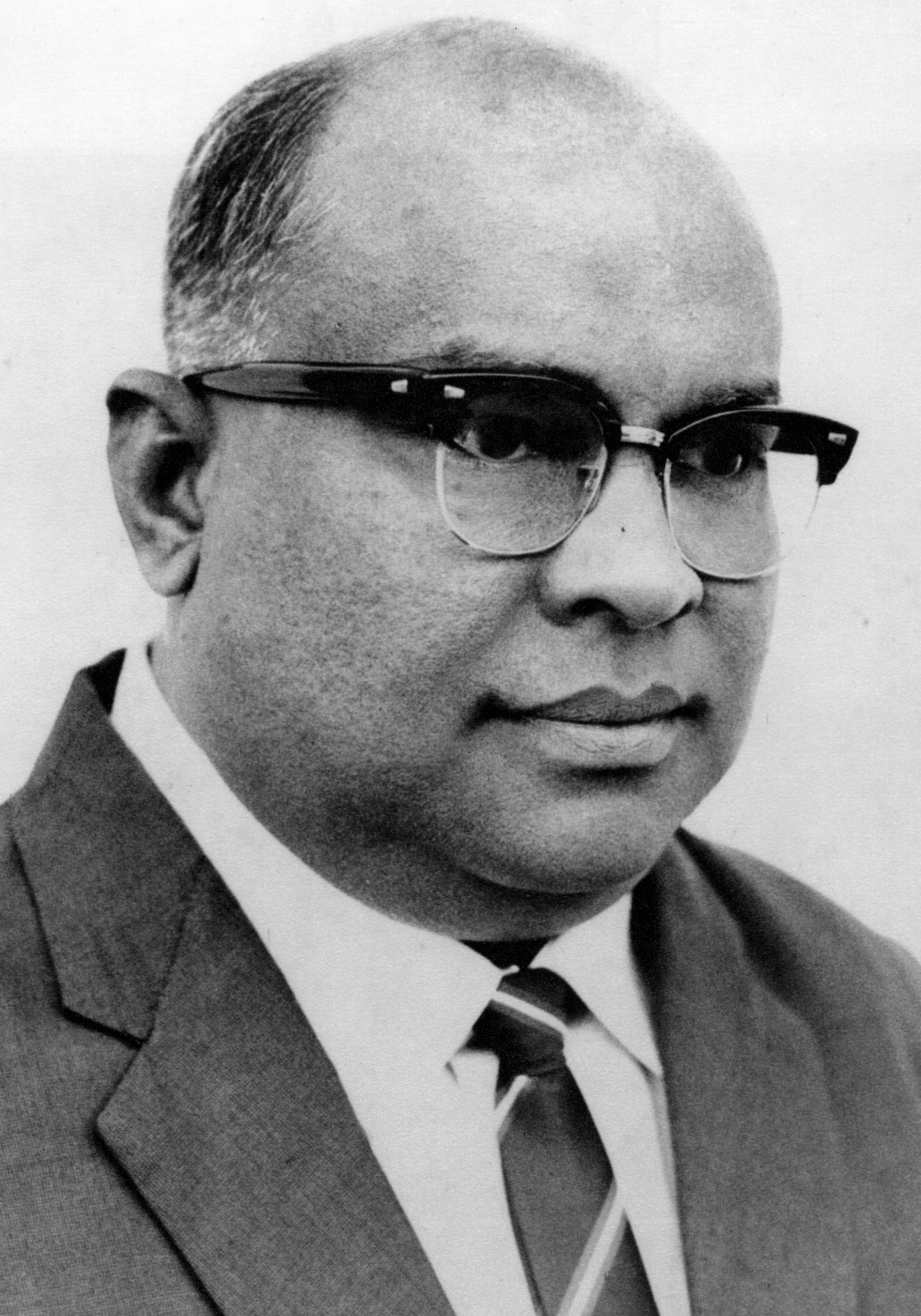
- Hussain Salahuddin Fathimath Saeed Ibrahim Shihab
- Country: Maldives
- Current region: Malé
- Origin: Malé, Maldive Islands
- Founder: Hussain Salahuddin
- Members: Hussain Salahuddin; Tuttu Goma; Sanfa Manike; Dhon Didi; Fathimath Saeed; Ibrahim Shihab; Mariyam Saeed; Adnan Hussain; Mohamed Saeed; Aishath; Khadheeja Saeed; Hawwa Saeed; Ibrahim Nasir
- Connected members: Ameena Mohamed Amin; Ahmed Muthasim Adnan; Mohamed Jameel Didi
- Connected families: Family of Mohamed Amin Didi; Jameel family

The Salahuddin family is a Maldivian descended family that are active in law, poetry, and politics. The immediate family of Hussain Salahuddin includes his eight children among his three wives.

== Immediate family ==
=== Wives ===
Salahuddin had three wives, Tuttu Goma, Sanfa Manike, Dhon Didi.

=== Children ===
==== Mariyam Saeed ====
Mariyam Saeed (Dhivehi: މަރިޔަމް ސައީދު) was a Maldivian poet who served as the first lady of the Maldives from 1968 to 1969 during the presidency of her husband Ibrahim Nasir. She is the child of Hussain Salahuddin with his wife Tuttu Goma.

==== Fathimath Saeed ====
Fathimath Saeed (Dhivehi: ފާޠިމަތު ސަޢީދު) was a Maldivian poet who served as the first lady of the Maldives during the presidency of her husband, Mohamed Amin Didi. She's the daughter of Hussain Salahuddin with his wife Tuttu Goma.

==== Ibrahim Shihab ====
Ibrahim Shihab was a Maldivian poet and politician who served as the vice president of the Maldives from 1975 to 1977. He also served as the Attorney General, Speaker of the People's Majlis, and the Vazeerul Ma'aarif. He's the son of Hussain Salahuddin through his wife Tuttu Goma.

==== Mohamed Saeed ====
Mohamed Saeed Didi was a Maldivian politician who represented Addu Meedhoo under the first constitution of the Maldives. He is the son of Hussain Salahuddin from his wife Sanfa Manike.

==== Adnan Hussain ====
Adnan Hussain was a Maldivian politician who served as the Vazeerul Ma'aarif (Minister of Education) and Attorney General of the Sultanate of the Maldive Islands. He is the son of Hussain Salahuddin.

==== Other children ====
Salahuddin's other children also includes Hawwa Saeed and Khadheeja Saeed from his wife Dhon Didi, Aishath from his wife Sanfa Manike.

== Other relations ==
=== Ameena Mohamed Amin ===
Ameena Mohamed Amin (Dhivehi: އަމީނާ މުޙައްމަދު އަމީން) was a Maldivian politician and former parliamentarian who served as the President's Member of the People's Majlis. She is the daughter of Fathimath Saeed.

=== Ahmed Muthasim Adnan ===
Ahmed Muthasim Adnan (Dhivehi: އަޙްމަދު މުޢުތަޞިމް ޢަދުނާން) is a Maldivian lawyer who served as the Chief Justice of the Maldives from 2019 to 2025. He is the son of Adnan Hussain.

=== Mohamed Jameel Didi ===
Mohamed Jameel Didi (Dhivehi: މުޙައްމަދު ޖަމީލު ދީދީ) was a Maldivian politician and poet who served as Attorney General of the Maldives from 1956 to 1956. He's the nephew of Hussain Salahuddin.
