= Fathimath Ibrahim =

First Lady of the Maldives from 2013 to 2018

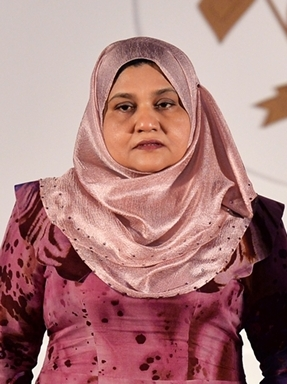
- Ibrahim in 2017

7th First Lady of the Maldives
- In role 17 November 2013 – 17 November 2018
- President: Abdulla Yameen
- Preceded by: Ilham Hussain
- Succeeded by: Fazna Ahmed

Personal details
- Born: 9 September 1960 (age 66) Malé, Maldive Islands
- Spouse: Abdulla Yameen (m. 1985)
- Relations: Gayoom family
- Children: 3

Fathimath Ibrahim (Dhivehi: ފާޠިމަތު އިބްރާހީމް; born 9 September 1960) is a Maldivian politician who served as the first lady of the Maldives from 2013 to 2018 as the wife of Abdulla Yameen, the 6th president of the Maldives.

== Early life ==
Fathimath Ibrahim was born on 9 September 1960. She was the daughter of Aishath Moosa (1936–2016). On 25 February 1985, Ibrahim married Abdulla Yameen; they have three children, daughter Ghaadhaa and son Zain.

== See also ==
- Sajidha Mohamed
- Nasreena Ibrahim
- Naseema Mohamed
