= List of awards and honours received by Maumoon Abdul Gayoom =

Maumoon Abdul Gayoom, the 3rd president of the Maldives has been recognized with numerous honors throughout his distinguished political career and long presidency spanning from 1978 to 2008.

== National honors ==
Country	Date	Decoration	Post-nominal letters
Maldives	26 July 2013	Order of Ghazi	NGIV
Maldives	26 July 2015	Golden Jubilee Shield of Honour	

== Foreign honors ==
Country	Date	Decoration	Post-nominal letters
South Korea	12 October 1984	Grand Order of Mugunghwa	
United Kingdom	1997	Knight Grand Cross of St Michael and St George	GCMG
Sri Lanka	13 February 2008	Sri Lanka Mitra Vibhushana	

== Awards ==
Location	Year	Institution	Award
United States	1988	United Nations Environment Programme	Global 500 Roll of Honour
Italy	1991	Lega Navale Italiana	Man of the Sea Award for 1990
Germany	1998	Deutsche Gesellschaft für Internationale Zusammenarbeit	International Environment Award
Switzerland	1998	World Health Organization	WHO Health-for-All Gold Medal
United States	1999	World Bodybuilding Federation	Gold Medal
Egypt	2002	Al-Azhar University	Shield of Al-Azhar University
India	2008	The Energy and Resources Institute	Sustainable Development Leadership Award

== Honorary degrees ==
Location	Year	School	Degree
United States	1988	International University Foundation	Doctor of Philosophy in Political Science
India	1983	Aligarh Muslim University	Doctor of Letters honoris causa doctorate
India	1990	Jamia Millia Islamia	Doctor of Letters honoris causa doctorate
India	1994	Pondicherry University	Doctor of Letters honoris causa doctorate
