= Abdul Majeed Mahir =

Maldivian politician (1928–2024)

- ޢަބްދުލްމަޖީދު މާހިރު

3rd President of the Malé Municipality
- In office 11 February 1960 – 1 September 1961
- Prime Minister: Ibrahim Nasir
- Preceded by: Malin Mohamed Didi
- Succeeded by: Office abolished Umar Zahir (1982)

Personal details
- Born: 1928 Funaadu, Fuvahmulah, Maldives
- Died: 3 October 2024 (aged 96) Malé, Maldives
- Party: Maldivian Democratic Party
- Spouse(s): Kolige Naasiraa (divorced), Ameena Mohamed Amin (divorced)
- Children: Ameen Faisal; Farahanaz Faisal, Faisal Ameen
- Parents: Mohamed Didi (father); Aishath Didi (mother)
- Relatives: Ibrahim Muhammad Didi (brother); Ibrahim Nasir (nephew)

Abdul Majeed Mahir (Dhivehi: ޢަބްދުލްމަޖީދު މާހިރު; 1928 – 3 October 2024) was a Maldivian politician, born in Fuvahmulah to Funaadu Ganduvaru Aisha Didi of Fuvahmulah and Velaanaagey Mohamed Didi of Malé, Maldives. He served in high government posts during his nephew Ibrahim Nasir's presidency, such as the position of Deputy Minister of Finance and the position of Deputy Minister of Peace and Security (Mahkamatul Aman Aammuge Veriyaage Naib) according to some sources. He also served as the President of Malé Municipality from 1960 to 1961 and served in the Management of MWSC (Malé Water and Sewerage Company) during Maumoon Abdul Gayoom's presidency.

After the multi-party system started functioning in the Maldives, Mahir became a supporter of the Maldivian Democratic Party and was an outspoken critic of President Maumoon Abdul Gayoom. Mahir is the father of Minister of Defence in the Cabinet of President Mohamed Nasheed's government, Ameen Faisal and Maldivian High Commissioner to the United Kingdom back then, Dr. Farahanaz Faisal.

Mahir was an expert on Natural and Alternative medicine and published books on the subject too. He died on 3 October 2024, at the age of 96.
