= Hussain Salahuddin =

Maldivian writer, poet, and academic (1881–1948)

- ހުސެއިން ސަލާހުއްދީން
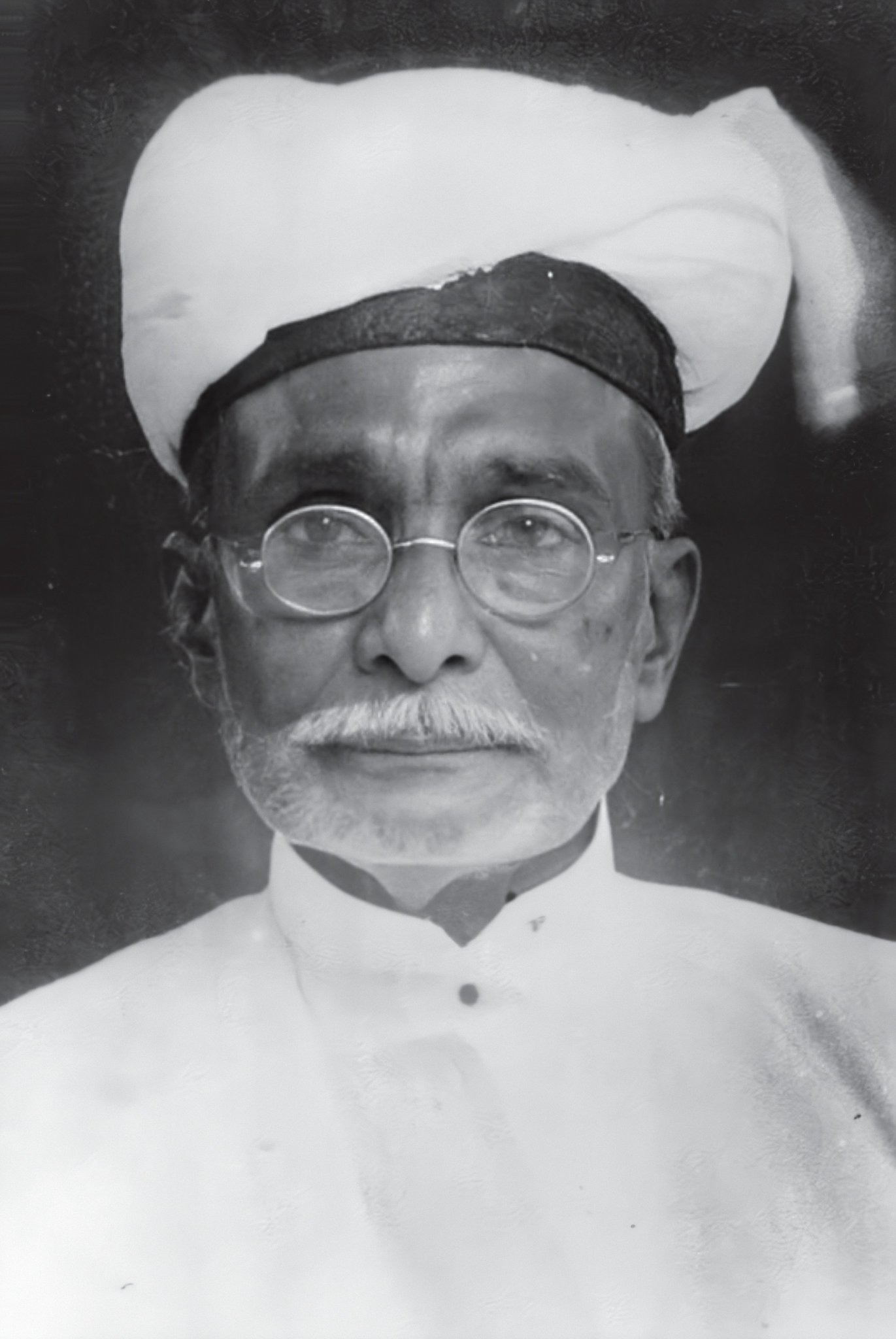
- Official portrait
- Born: 14 April 1881; Fura Malé, Maldive Islands
- Died: 20 September 1948 (aged 67); Colombo, Sri Lanka
- Other name: Salahuddin Hussein bin Moosa al-Mahli (صلاح الدين حسين بن موسى المحلى)
- Occupations: Scholar, linguist, poet, writer, essayist
- Works: The Story of Dhon Beefaan; Nu'umaan and Mariyam; Biography of Prophet Muhammad; Biography of Muhammad Thakurufaanu al-Auzam
- Spouse(s): Dhon Didi; Sanfa Manike; Medhuganduvaru Thuththu Gomaa
- Children: 8, including Mariyam Saeed, Fathimath Saeed, Ibrahim Shihab
- Relatives: Salahuddin family

Attorney General
- In office 23 December 1900 – 17 December 1928
- Monarchs: Imaaduddeen VI; Shamsuddeen III
- Succeeded by: Abdullah Kamaluddin

Hussain Salahuddin (Dhivehi: ހުސެއިން ސަލާހުއްދީން; 14 April 1881 – 20 September 1948), was an influential Maldivian writer, poet, essayist and scholar.

Salahuddin was one of the most prolific writers of early modern Maldivian literature at a time named 'Era of Crawling' (Dhivehi: ޅަފަތުގެ ދައުރު, romanized: Lhafathuge Dhauru), and contributed to Maldivian literature.

== Lifetime and career ==
Hussain Salahuddin was born on 14 April 1881. He signed his writings as Salahuddin Hussein bin Moosa al-Mahli (Arabic: صلاح الدين حسين بن موسى المحلى), meaning "Salahuddin Hussain, son of Moosa from Malé". He obtained his education on the island of Meedhoo. His master was Al-Allam al-Shaikh al-Hafiz Ibrahim Thakurufaan (Aisaabeegedaru Dhon Beyyaa). He subsequently studied under al-Shaikh Muhamed Jamaluddin Naib Thutthu. He is recognised for his contributions to Maldivian literature, including the translation of various books written in Arabic, Urdu and Persian into Dhivehi.

He also served in various key positions in the Maldivian government. He became the Attorney General of the Maldives at the young age of 18. He also served as the Chief Justice of the Maldives for a long time. Among the other positions that he assumed were the posts of Secretary and Prime Minister for the Majlis.

He served as the founder and principal of Majeediyya School in Malé, the first institution of formal education in the Maldives. Majeediyya School was started on the front veranda of Bageechaage, Salahuddin's residence.

Salahuddin served in the National Literary Committee established by the President of the Maldives, Mohamed Amin Didi.

Books that he wrote include: The Story of Dhon Beefaan; The Story of Thakurufaan the Great; Shaikh Zubair, an interpretation of the works of two great Maldivian poets; Nu'umaan and Mariyam; two anthologies of poetry titled Morning Star I and II; and his most famous work, The Biography of Prophet Muhammad, in which he translated and combined various Arabic books about Muhammad into Dhivehi.

On 3 September 2024, President Mohamed Muizzu awarded Hussain Salahuddin the Highest Honour for Service to Maldivian Nationhood.

== Death ==
Hussain Salahuddin died on 20 September 1948. He was buried in Colombo, Sri Lanka.

== Children ==
Hussain Salaahuddin's children were all writers, poets and speakers who filled various high positions in the government of Maldives.

Children of Dhon Didi:

- Hawwa Saeed
- Khadheeja Saeed

Children of Sanfa Manike:

- Aishath
- Mohamed Saeed

Children of Medhuganduvaru Thuththu Gomaa:

- Adnan Hussain
- Fathimath Saeed
- Ibrahim Shihab
- Mariyam Saeed
