= Ameen Faisal =

Maldivian politician

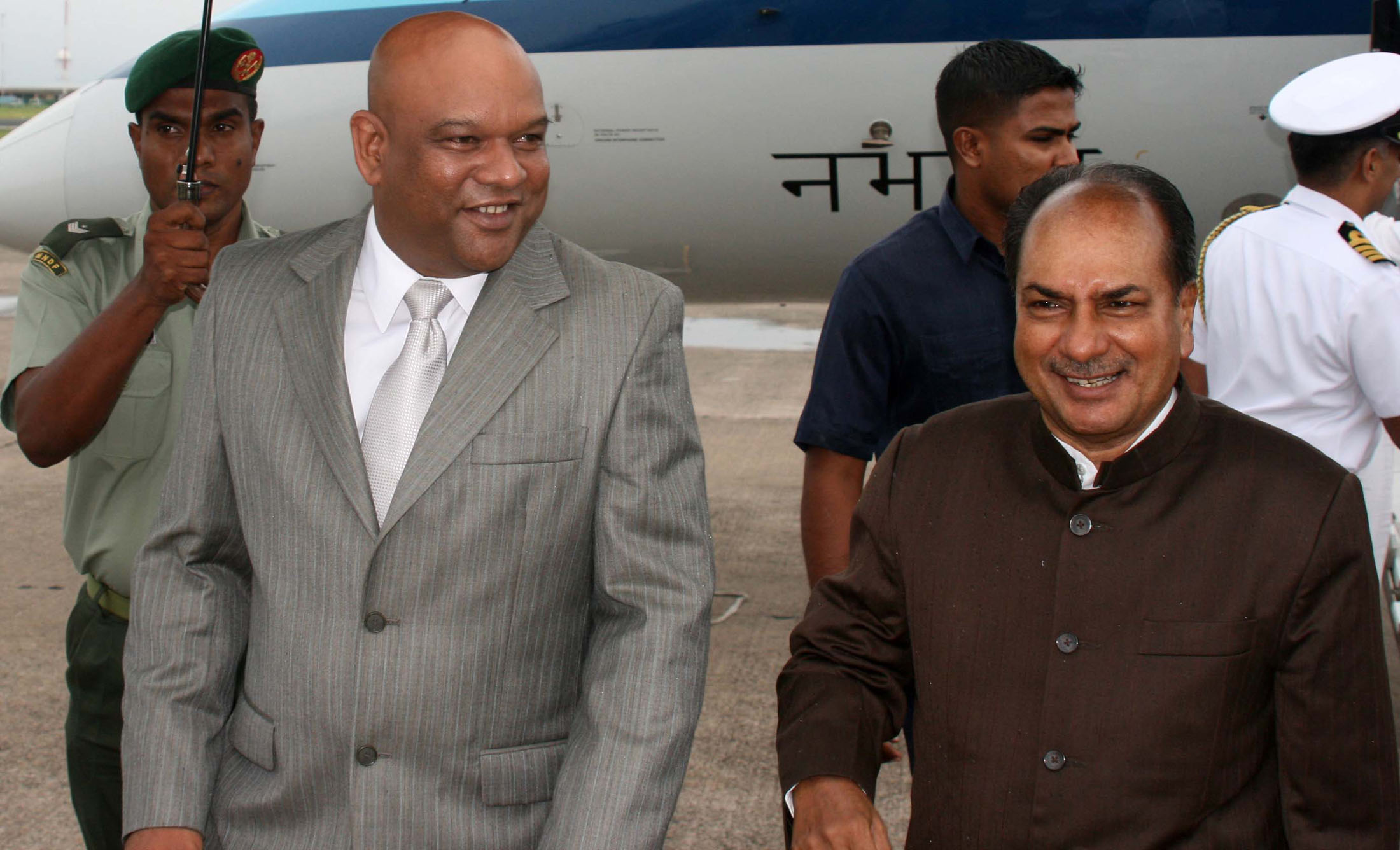
- Faisal (left) with A K Antony

National Security Advisor
- In office 10 December 2010 – 7 February 2012
- President: Mohamed Nasheed
- Preceded by: Mohamed Zahir
- Succeeded by: Position abolished

Minister of Defense and National Security
- In office 12 November 2008 – 10 December 2010
- President: Mohamed Nasheed
- Preceded by: Ismail Shafeeu
- Succeeded by: Mohamed Muizzu Adnan (Acting)

Personal details
- Born: 16 January 1963 (age 63) Malé, Maldives
- Party: The Democrats (Maldives)
- Relations: See Family of Mohamed Amin Didi
- Children: 6

Ameen Faisal is a Maldivian politician who served as the National Security Advisor of the Maldives from 2010 to 2012. He previously served as the Minister of Defence and National Security of the Maldives.

== Political career ==
He was a founding member of the Maldivian Democratic Party (MDP). He was active in Major Rallies with the President Mohamed Nasheed, while he was an activist. Ameen resigned on 7 February 2012, with the cabinet of president Mohamed Nasheed tendered televised en masse resignation.

Ameen Faisal played a major role in the then opposition rallies in the presidency of Abdulla Yameen, and was instrumental in the 2018 presidential campaign of the President Ibrahim Mohamed Solih. He was expected to be the Minister of Defence in the new coalition government cabinet, but the chairperson of MDP Mariya Ahmed Didi was appointed.

== Family life ==
Ameen Faisal's mother was Annabeela Ameena Mohamed Amin (1935–2020). His grandfather is Mohamed Amin Didi, the first President of the Maldives. He has 2 own siblings, Ibrahim Faisal, Farahanaz Faisal . He has 6 children as well, Azlina Ameen, Mohamed Ameen, Mariyam Ameen, Ahmed Ameen, Daniyal Ameen Faisal, & Eshal Ameen Faisal. His father is Abdul Majeed Mahir, a former member of parliament.

Preceded by Mohamed Zahir	National Security Advisor; 2010–2012	Succeeded by Abolished
