= Ahmed Shathir =

Maldivian politician

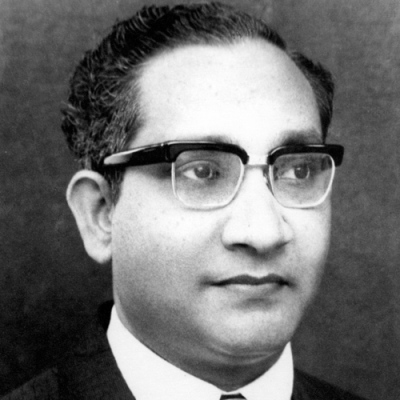
- Official portrait, 1972

Speaker of the People's Majlis
- In office 1 August 1972 – 11 November 1982
- President: Ibrahim Nasir; Maumoon Abdul Gayoom
- Preceded by: Ahmed Zaki
- Succeeded by: Ibrahim Shihab

Personal details
- Born: 19 December 1926
- Died: 26 July 1994 (aged 67)

Sheikh Ahmed Shathir (19 February 1926 — 26 July 1994) was a Maldivian politician and religious scholar, who served as the Speaker of the People's Majlis.

== Personal life ==
Shathir was married to Jameela Ibrahim Didi daughter of former Prime Minister Ibrahim Faamuladheyri Kilegefaanuge of Eggamuge.
