= Fazna Ahmed =

First Lady of the Maldives from 2018 to 2023

- ފަޒްނާ އަހުމަދު
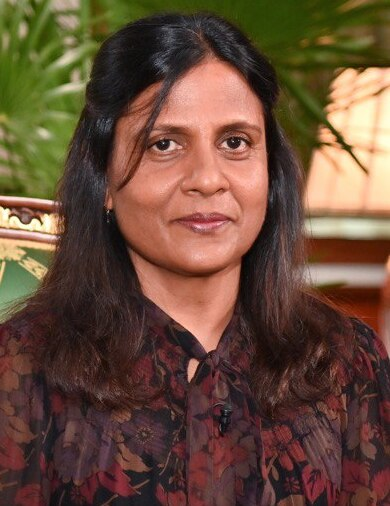
- Portrait, 2022

8th First Lady of the Maldives
- In role 17 November 2018 – 17 November 2023
- President: Ibrahim Mohamed Solih
- Preceding: Fathimath Ibrahim
- Succeeded by: Sajidha Mohamed

Personal details
- Born: 24 May 1967 (age 59) Malé, Maldives
- Party: Maldivian Democratic Party
- Spouse: Ibrahim Mohamed Solih
- Children: 2
- Parent: Zameera Umar

Fazna Ahmed (Dhivehi: ފަޒްނާ އަހުމަދު; born 24 May 1967) is the former First Lady of the Maldives. She is the wife of Ibrahim Mohamed Solih, the former President of the Maldives.
