= Adnan Hussain (footballer) =

Emirati footballer (born 1985)

Personal information
- Full name: Adnan Hussain Al-Bloushi
- Date of birth: 6 December 1985 (age 40)
- Place of birth: Dubai, United Arab Emirates
- Height: 1.65 m (5 ft 5 in)
- Position: Attacking midfielder

Senior career*
Years	Team	Apps	(Gls)
2005–2009	Al Nasr	40	(4)
2009–2011	Emirates Club	71	(10)
2011–2013	Baniyas	27	(1)
2013–2014	Al Ahli	27	(3)
2014–2016	Al-Wasl F.C.	12	(0)
2016–2020	Hatta	41	(3)
2020–2021	Al Dhaid	16	(1)

International career^{‡}
2012	United Arab Emirates	1	(0)
- * Club domestic league appearances and goals as of 6 October 2021 ‡ National team caps and goals as of 26 October 2012

Adnan Hussain (born 6 December 1985) is a UAE international footballer who plays as a midfielder.
