= Laila Ali Abdulla =

Maldivian activist (born 1965)

- ލައިލާ އަލީ އަބްދުالله
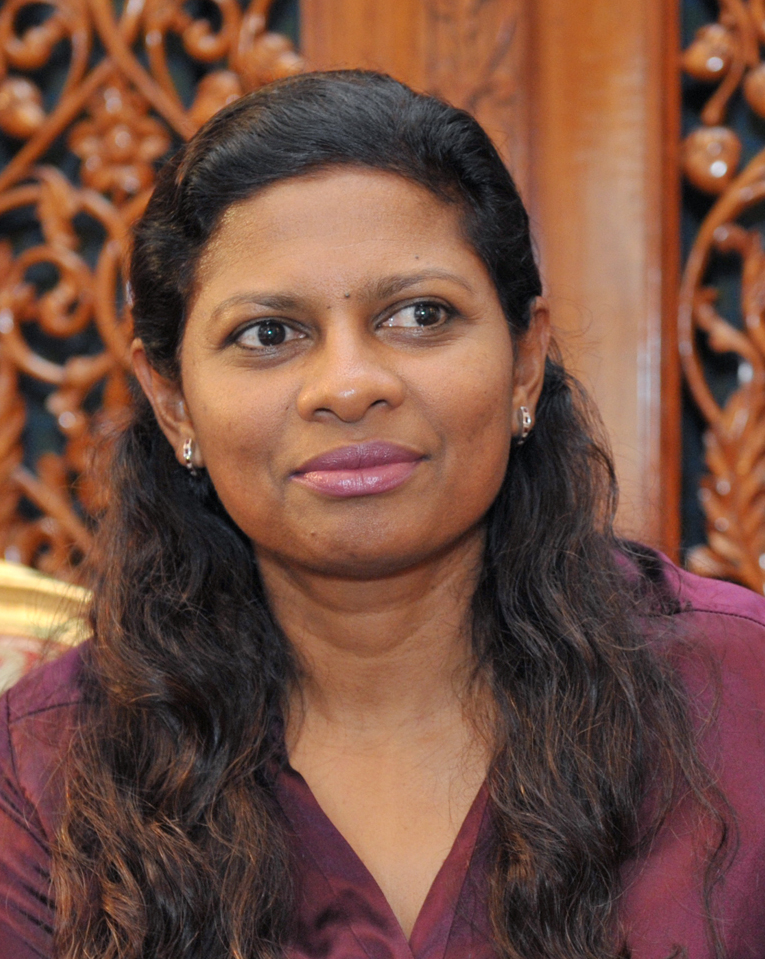
- Ali in 2011

5th First Lady of the Maldives
- In role 11 November 2008 – 7 February 2012
- President: Mohamed Nasheed
- Preceded by: Nasreena Ibrahim
- Succeeded by: Ilham Hussain

Personal details
- Born: Malé, Maldives
- Spouse: Mohamed Nasheed (m. 1994; div. 2021)
- Children: 2

Laila Ali Abdulla (Dhivehi: ލައިލާ އަލީ އަބްދުالله; born 13 August 1965) is a Maldivian activist who served as the First Lady of the Maldives from 11 November 2008 until 7 February 2012. She was the wife of the fourth president of the Maldives, Mohamed Nasheed.

== Activism work ==
Abdulla's ex-husband, Mohamed Nasheed, was the Maldives first democratically elected president (2008–2012). In 2014, Nasheed was found guilty of terrorism on false charges and sentenced to 13 years in prison. Ali Abdulla worked alongside Nasheed's lawyer, Amal Clooney, to get his charges overturned.

On 24 March 2015 Ms. Ali Abdulla held a press conference in which she asked Indian Prime Minister Narendra Modi to intervene in her husband's case so that he can be released from jail. In a phone interview with the media she said, "I do not know what it will take PM Modi to do it but my wish is that India helps in ensuring that my husband is freed unconditionally and that representative democracy is restored. How India does it is for the PM to decide",

On 30 June 2015, Abdulla held a Press Club Newsmaker urging for her husband's release, stating that he was under solitary confinement throughout his detention.

In January 2016, Mr. Nasheed was allowed to leave the Maldives through an internationally brokered deal. On 23 January 2016, Ali Abdulla accompanied her husband and his lawyer, Amal Clooney, to meet with British Prime Minister David Cameron to discuss Mr. Nasheed's case.

== Personal life ==
Nasheed and Laila has two children named Meera Laila Nasheed and Zaya Laila Nasheed. They divorced in 2021.
