= Naseema Mohamed =

First Lady of the Maldives from 1969 to 1978

Naseema Mohamed NIIV
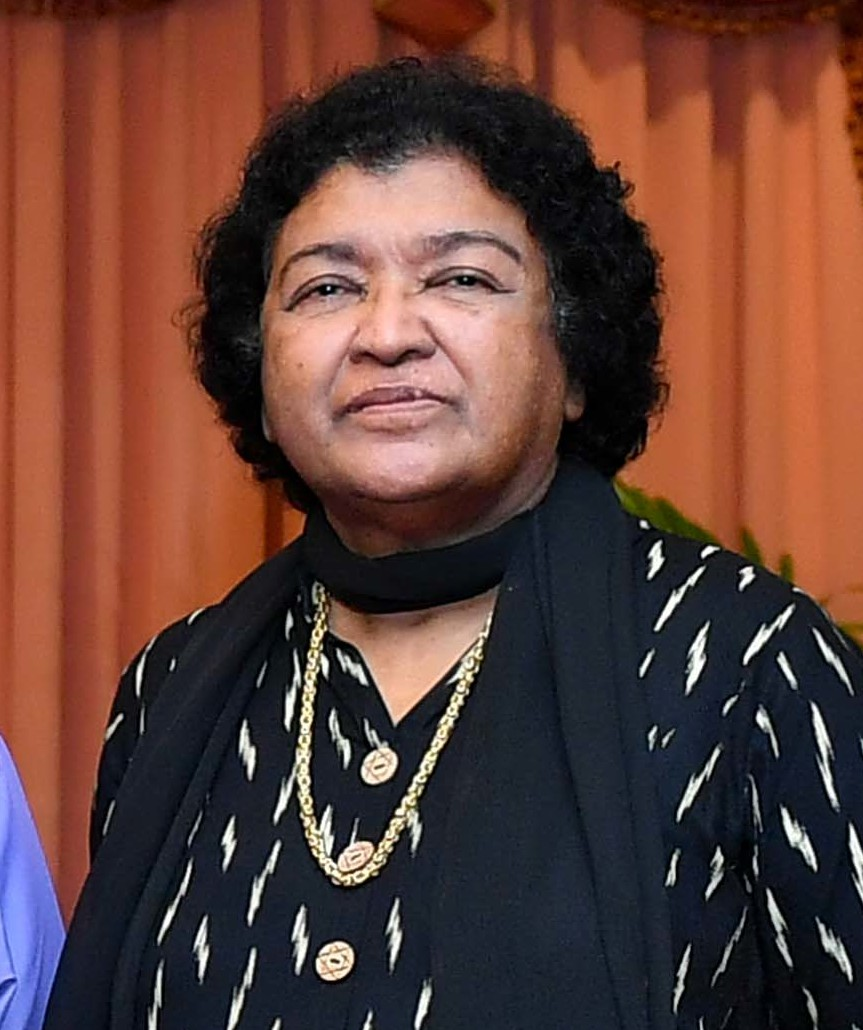
- Naseema Mohamed in 2019

First Lady of the Maldives
- In office 31 May 1969 – 11 November 1978
- Preceded by: Mariyam Saeed
- Succeeded by: Nasreena Ibrahim

Personal details
- Born: 14 December 1940 (age 85) Malé, Maldives
- Spouse: Ibrahim Nasir (m. 1969; died 2008)
- Children: Ismail Nasir; Aisha Nasir
- Occupation: Linguist and Historian
- Awards: National Exemplary Service Medal

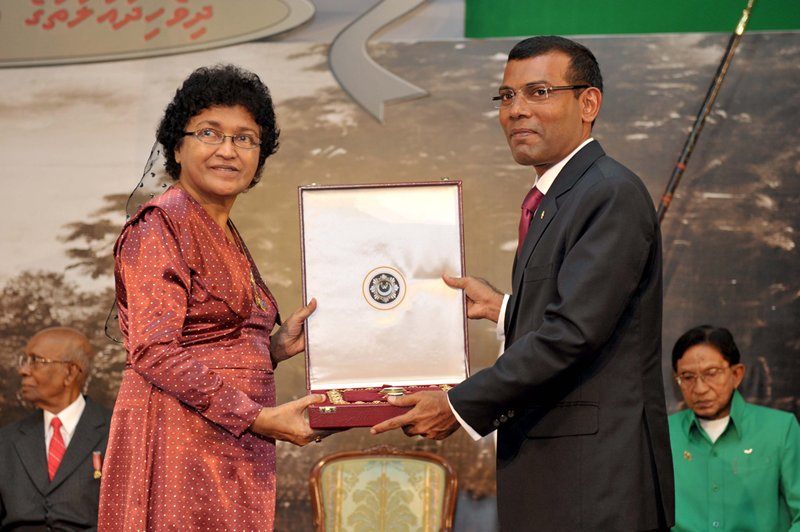
Mohamed receiving the National Exemplary Service Medal from President Mohamed Nasheed

Naseema Mohamed, NIIV (also known as Naseema Mohamed Kaleyfaanu) is a Maldivian historian and politician who served as the First Lady of the Maldives from 1969 to 1978 and the third wife of former President Ibrahim Nasir. She is also a scholar on Maldivian history and culture.

After Ibrahim Nasir went into self-exile to Singapore on 7 December 1978, Naseema continued to live in Malé and worked as a historian for the National Centre for Linguistic and Historic Research. She has written extensively on early Maldivian history and the Dhivehi language. She had also previously worked as a nurse. Currently working for Dhivehi Bahuge Academy. She worked at the Maldives National Museum, retiring in 2011. She received the National Exemplary Service Medal in 2011.

Naseema served as an advisor to the Ministry of Arts, Culture and Heritage.
