= Kurumba Maldives =

Resort in Maldives

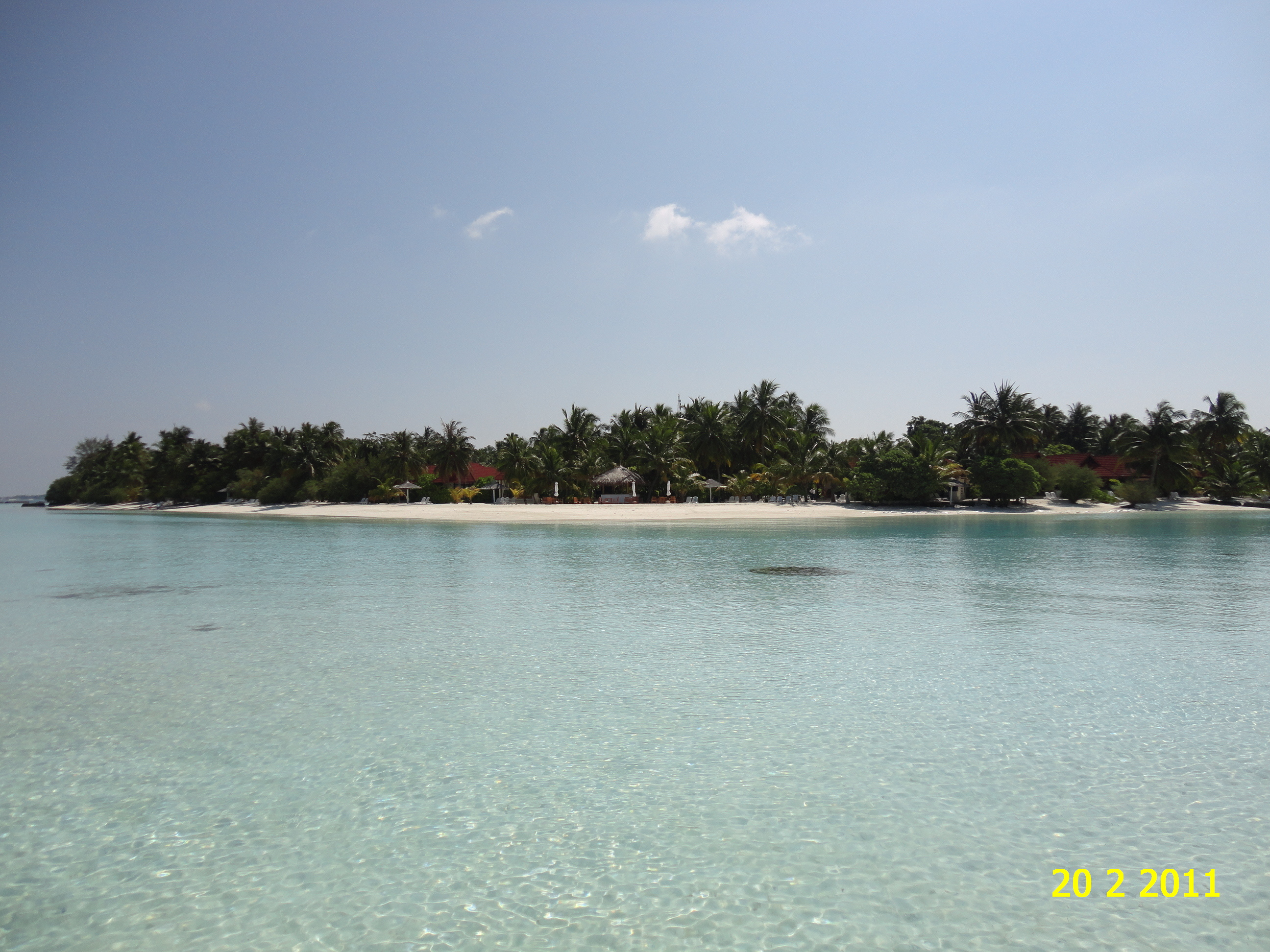
- Interactive map of the Kurumba Maldives area

General information
- Location: Vihamanaafushi, North Male Atoll 08340, Republic Of Maldives, Vihamanaafushi, North Malé Atoll, Maldives
- Coordinates: 4°13′35″N 73°31′10″E
- Opening: 3 October 1972
- Owner: Universal Resorts

Other information
- Number of rooms: 180 Rooms/Villas
- Number of restaurants: 8

Website
- kurumba.com

Kurumba Maldives is a resort on the island of Vihamanaafushi, located in the North Malé Atoll in the Maldives. Managed by Universal Resorts, Kurumba Maldives is the country's first resort.

== History ==
The resort opened in 1972 with its founders including local Maldivians, Mohamed Umar Maniku and Ahmed Naseem (Kerafa Naseem).

== Awards and achievements ==
The awards and achievements by the resort include:

=== 2008 ===
- Indian Ocean's Leading Resort – World Travel Awards

=== 2010 ===
- Maldives’ Leading Hotel – World Travel Awards

=== 2011 ===
- Maldives’ Leading Hotel – World Travel Awards

=== 2013 ===
- Travellers’ Choice Awards for Best Service in the Maldives - TripAdvisor
- Travellers’ Choice Awards for Luxury in the Maldives - TripAdvisor
- Travellers’ Choice Awards, Top 25 Hotels in Maldives – TripAdvisor
- (Nominated) Indian Ocean's Leading Conference Hotel - World Travel Awards
- (Nominated) Maldives Leading Resort - World Travel Awards
- (Nominated) Maldives Leading Family Resort - World Travel Awards
- (Nominated) Maldives Leading Resort Spa - Luxury Travel Awards
- 2013 Certificate of Excellence - TripAdvisor
- Top 100 Resorts in The World - Top Hotel
- No. 1 All-Inclusive Resort in Asia - TripAdvisor
- Top 25 All-Inclusive Resorts in the World - TripAdvisor
- Leading CSR Programme in the Maldives - MATATO

=== 2014 ===
- Best Spa Manager Award (Maldives) for Veli Spa - World Luxury Spa Awards
- Finalist for Best Luxury Resort Spa (Maldives) for Veli Spa - World Luxury Spa Awards
- 2014 Certificate of Excellence - TripAdvisor
- No. 1 All-Inclusive Resort in Asia - TripAdvisor
- No. 3 All-Inclusive Resort Worldwide - TripAdvisor
- Leading CSR Programme in the Maldives – MATATO

=== 2015 ===
- Best Destination (Maldives) Spa Award for Veli Spa - World Luxury Spa Awards
- Top 10 Luxury Hotels – Maldives, TripAdvisor Travellers' Choice Awards
- Top 10 Hotels for Service – Maldives, TripAdvisor Travellers' Choice Awards
- Top 10 Hotels – Maldives, TripAdvisor Travellers' Choice Awards
- Number 1 All Inclusive Resort worldwide - TripAdvisor's Travellers Choice Awards
- Number 1 All Inclusive Resort Asia - Trip Advisors Travellers Choice Awards
- Kurumba Maldives - TripAdvisor Certificate of Excellence and Hall of Fame Award
- Veli Spa - TripAdvisor Certificate of Excellence
- Extreme Water Sports - TripAdvisor Certificate of Excellence
- Euro Divers - TripAdvisor Certificate of Excellence
- Top 3: Top Maldives Employer Award 2014 by Job-Maldives.com
- Travelife Gold Award

== CSR Activities ==
- Party with a Purpose – Annual music festival charity event in support of the Kudhakudhinge Hiyaa Orphanage and Maafushi Island Education & Training Centre
- Running of Majaa Recreation involved in educating guests on marine environment conservation. url=http://www.kurumba.com/maldives-activities

== Sponsorships ==
Kurumba Maldives is involved in sponsoring Advocating the Rights of Children (ARC), a non-governmental and non-profit organization involved in promoting children's rights in Maldives.
