= First Lady of the Maldives =

Spouse of the president of the Maldives

- ދިވެހިރާއްޖޭގެ ރައީސުލްޖުމްހޫރިއްޔާގެ އަނބިކަނބަލުން

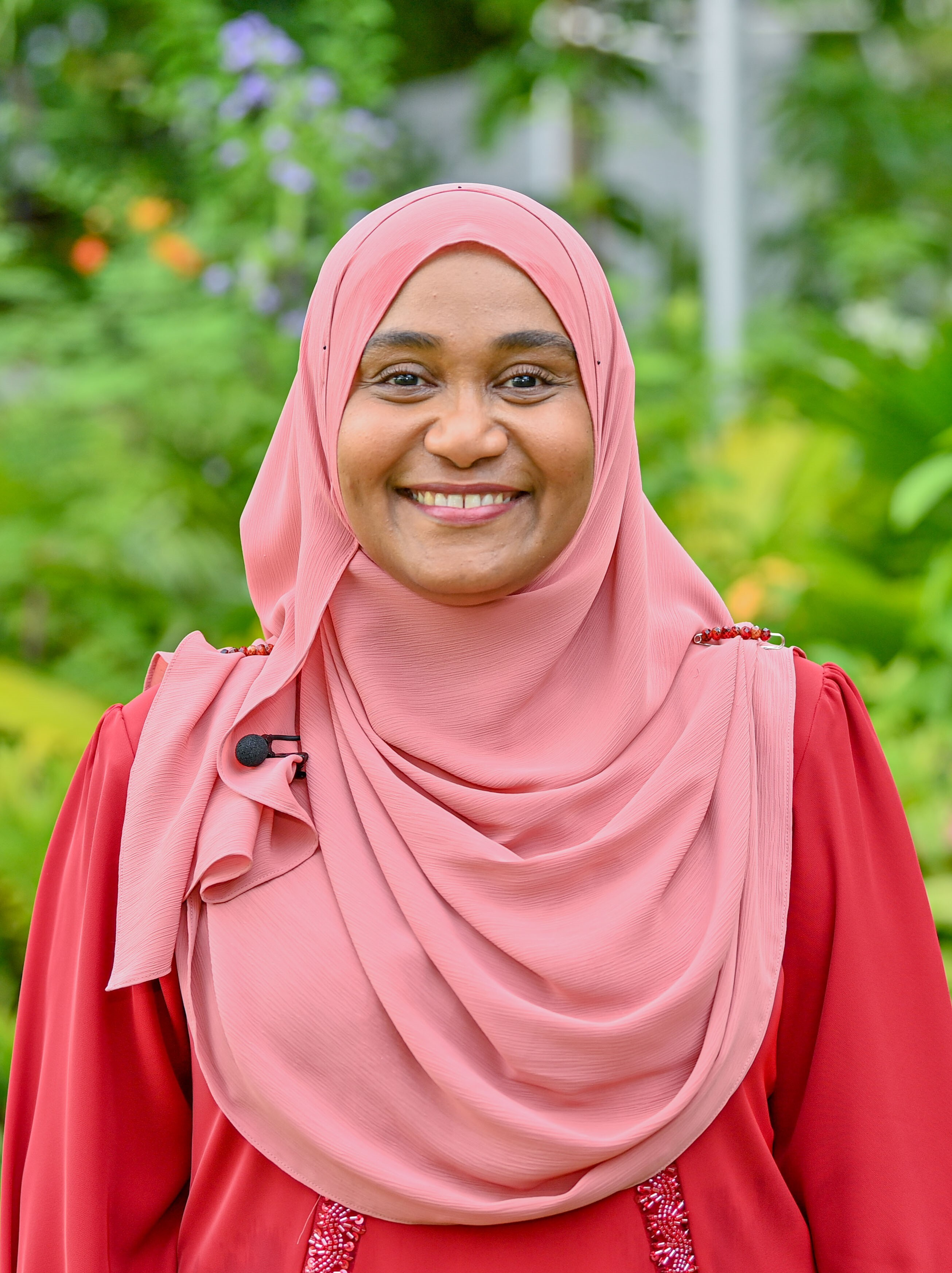
- Incumbent; Sajidha Mohamed since November 17, 2023
- Residence: Muliaage
- Term length: 5 years
- Formation: November 11, 1968
- Website: presidency.gov.mv

First Lady of the Maldives (Dhivehi: ދިވެހިރާއްޖޭގެ ރައީސުލްޖުމްހޫރިއްޔާގެ އަނބިކަނބަލުން, romanized: dhivehiraajjeyge raeesuljumhooriyyaage an'bikan'balun) is the title attributed to the wife of the president of the Maldives. The title of First Lady is utilized by the government and official publications. The country's current first lady is Sajidha Mohamed.

The Maldives was a sultanate from 1965 until 1968. The Second Republic of the Maldives was established in 1968 with the President as head of state. The position of First Lady was established in 1968 with the establishment of the post-independence presidency.

== First ladies of the Maldives ==
No.	Name	Portrait	Term Began	Term Ended	President of the Maldives	Marriage Date	Notes
1	Fathimath Saeed		January 1, 1953	August 21, 1953	Mohamed Amin Didi	Before 1935	The Shortest tenured first lady in the country's history.
2	Mariyam Saeed		November 11, 1968	May 31, 1969	Ibrahim Nasir		
3	Naseema Mohamed		May 31, 1969	November 11, 1978	Ibrahim Nasir	31 May 1969	Naseema Mohamed was the country's inaugural first lady following the establishment of the Second Republic. She was the third wife of President Ibrahim Nasir.
4	Nasreena Ibrahim		November 11, 1978	November 11, 2008	Maumoon Abdul Gayoom	14 July 1969	The longest tenured first lady in the country's history.
5	Laila Ali Abdulla		November 11, 2008	February 7, 2012	Mohamed Nasheed		
6	Ilham Hussain		February 7, 2012	November 17, 2013	Mohammed Waheed Hassan		
7	Fathimath Ibrahim		November 17, 2013	November 17, 2018	Abdulla Yameen		
8	Fazna Ahmed		November 17, 2018	November 17, 2023	Ibrahim Mohamed Solih		
9	Sajidha Mohamed		November 17, 2023	Incumbent	Mohamed Muizzu	18 May 2003	Incumbent First Lady
