= Ibrahim Shihab =

Vice President of the Maldives from 1975 to 1977

- އިބްރާހިމް ޝިހާބު
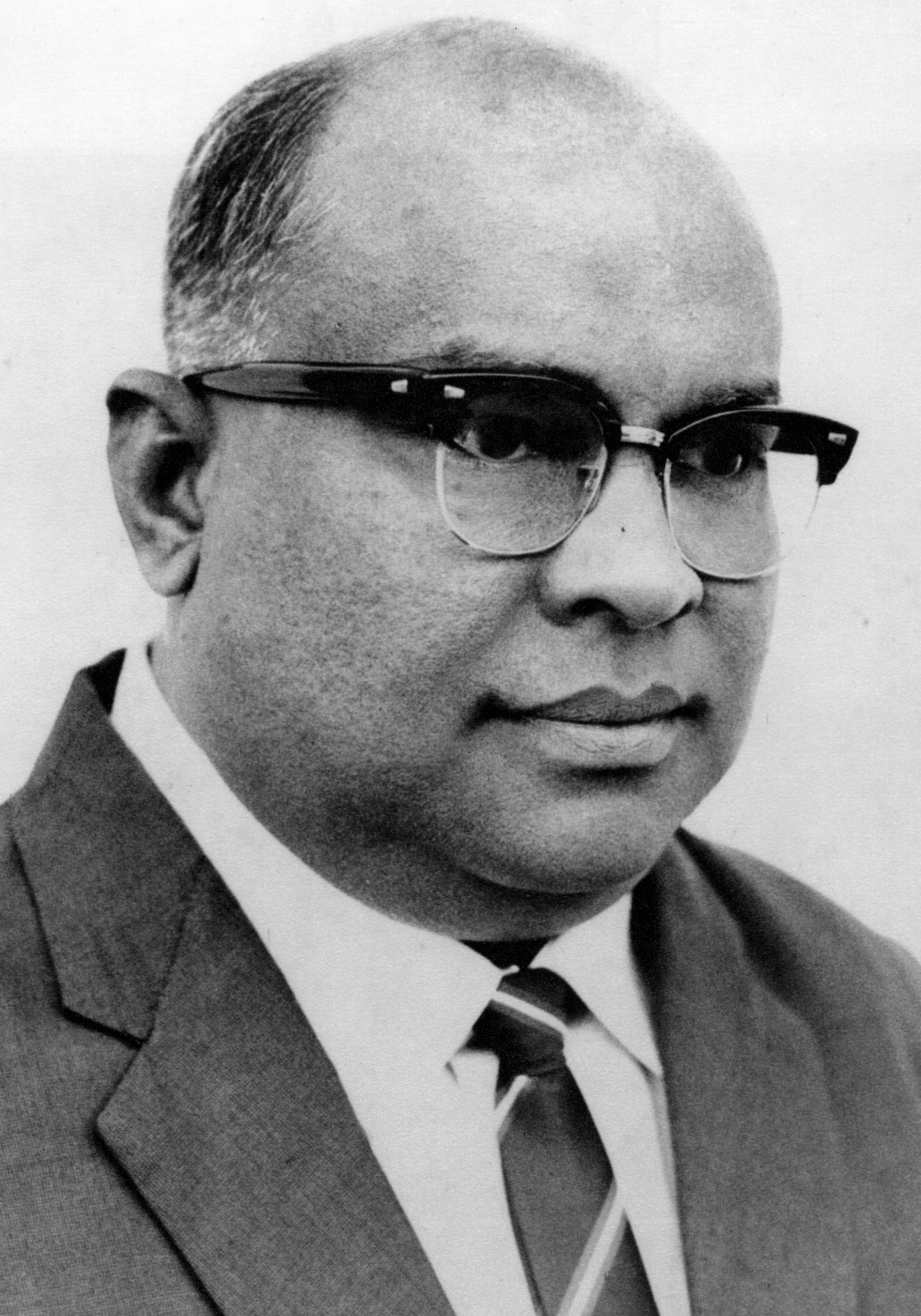
- Official portrait, c. 1980

Vice President of the Maldives
- In office 12 March 1975 – 6 January 1977 Serving with: Abdul Sattar Moosa Didi; Ahmed Hilmy Didi; Ali Maniku; Hassan Zareer
- President: Ibrahim Nasir
- Succeeded by: Office abolished

Speaker of the People's Majlis
- In office 11 November 1982 – 15 January 1988
- President: Maumoon Abdul Gayoom
- Preceded by: Ahmed Shathir
- Succeeded by: Abdulla Hameed

Attorney General
- In office 11 November 1968 – 8 March 1975
- President: Ibrahim Nasir
- Preceded by: Himself
- Succeeded by: Adnan Hussain
- In office 3 August 1959 – 11 November 1968
- Monarch: Muhammad Fareed Didi
- Preceded by: Adnan Hussain
- Succeeded by: Himself

Vazeerul Ma'aarif
- In office 3 June 1956 – 3 August 1959
- Monarch: Muhammad Fareed Didi
- Preceded by: Ibrahim Fareed Didi
- Succeeded by: Ibrahim Nasir

Personal details
- Born: 22 September 1922 Fura Malé, Maldive Islands
- Died: 15 January 1988 (aged 65) Sri Lanka
- Relations: Salahuddin family
- Parent: Hussain Salahuddin Medhuganduvaru Thuththu Gomaa

Al Nabeel Ibrahim Shihab (22 September 1922 – 15 January 1988), was an influential Maldivian writer, poet, essayist and statesman. He was the son of scholar Hussain Salahuddin.

Ibrahim Shihab is considered one of the most prolific writers of Maldivian literature at a time named 'Era of Crawling' (Dhivehi: ޅަފަތުގެ ދައުރު, romanized: Lhafathuge Dhauru).

== Life ==
He began at Maldivian Government's Service as clerk, Mahkamathul Dhaakhiliyyaa (from 14 January 1942 to 27 April 1951). After that he rose and held various high government posts, on 26 Muharram 1379 (3 August 1959) Ibrahim Shihab was designated as Attorney General and Mahukamathul Irushaadiyya in the cabinet nominated by Shihab's brother-in-law and Prime Minister Ibrahim Nasir.

During his life he held also Ministerial posts, was appointed as one of the Vice Presidents, and became a member of the Committee set up by the Cabinet to review and amend the Constitution.

He served as the speaker of People's Majlis from 1982 to 1988.

Towards the end of his life he was also named president of the council for linguistic and historical research.

Among his works, the General introduction to the concept of history, Preface to the Dhivehi Tareek is a good sample of his stylexs.

Ibrahim Shihab was loved and respected by Maldivians. At the time of his death the Television Maldives announcer giving the news broke down and cried.

He died on 15 January 1988 at 12:15 MVT.

== Awards ==
In 1979, Shihab received an award in the field of the Dhivehi language. In 1982, he received another award for his Dhivehi poetry. In 1990, he received an award for his service to the Maldivian government.
