= Prime Minister of the Maldives =

Head of government in the Maldives (1835–1975)

- Emblem of the Maldives

- Standard of the Prime Minister

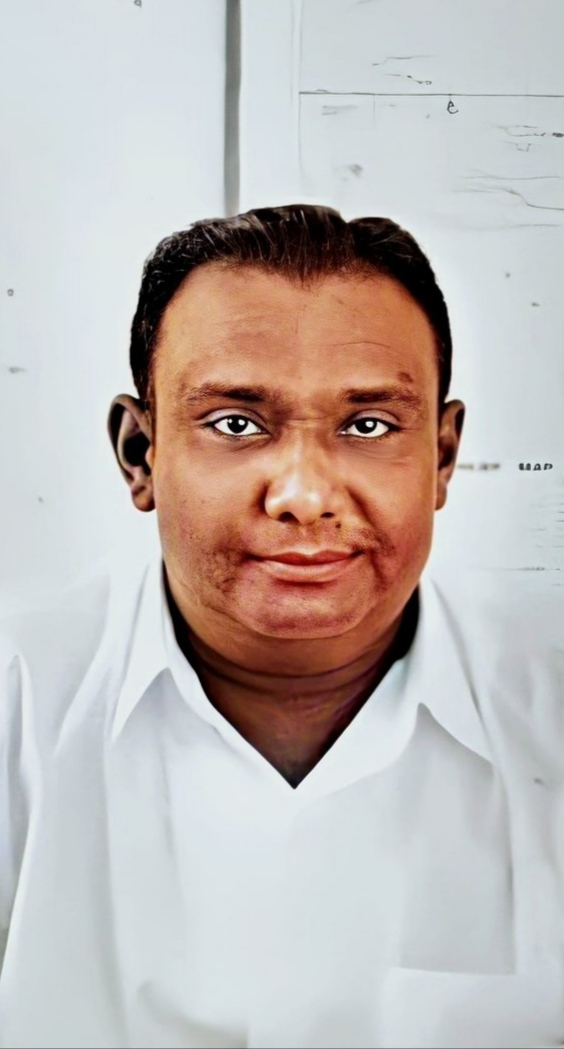
- Ahmed Zaki; August 1972 — March 1975
- Style: Prime Minister; The Honourable; His Excellency
- Status: Head of government (abolished)
- Member of: Cabinet
- Appointer: The president (Note: During the Sultanate, the prime minister was appointed by the Sultan and during the republic, they were appointed by the President.)
- Final holder: Ahmed Zaki
- Abolished: 6 March 1975

The prime minister of the Maldives was the head of government of the Maldives, during the Sultanate and the first and second republics between 1835 and 1975. The last Prime Minister was Ahmed Zaki, during the presidency of Ibrahim Nasir. On 6 March 1975, Zaki was removed from office and the position was abolished.

The prime minister was appointed by the Sultan following the consent of the Majlis.

== Prime ministers of the Maldives ==
Ibrahim Dhoshimeynaa Kilegefaanu served as Prime Minister on three occasions between 1883 and 1925. Abdul Majeed Didi served as Prime Minister from 1926 to 1932. Muhammad Fareed Didi served as Prime Minister from 1932 to 1944. Mohamed Amin Didi served as Prime Minister from 1945 to 1952.

After restoration of the Sultanate, Ibrahim Ali Didi served as Prime Minister from March 1954 to 1957 and Ibrahim Nasir served as Prime Minister from December 1957 to November 1968. When Nasir became Prime Minister, he focussed his work on limiting British influence in the Maldives. When he tried to stop the British reopening RAF Gan in 1959, Gan island declared independence from the Maldives as the United Suvadive Republic due to their economic reliance on the British presence there. In 1962, Nasir ended the breakaway by sending gunboats to the island and renegotiated with the British for better payments to the Maldives for the base's presence.

During the Republic, there was only one Prime Minister. Ahmed Zaki served as Prime Minister from August 1972 to March 1975. On 11 March 1975, President Nasir ordered that Ahmed was to be arrested, removed as Prime Minister, and exiled on the grounds of allegedly plotting against the President. Nasir also brought in an amendment to the Maldivian constitution the next month in order to abolish the office of Prime Minister and later replace it with the office of Vice-President of the Maldives. After Zaki was dismissed by Nasir, the post was abolished by Nasir and the abolition was approved by the People's Majlis. At the same time, appointment of vice presidents occurred.

== See also ==
- Politics of the Maldives
- History of the Maldives
- List of sultans of the Maldives
- List of head of state of the Maldives
- Vice President of the Maldives
- First Lady of the Maldives
