= Ibrahim Nasir =

President of the Maldives from 1968 to 1978

Ibrahim Nasir KCMG NGIV
- އިބްރާހިމް ނާޞިރު
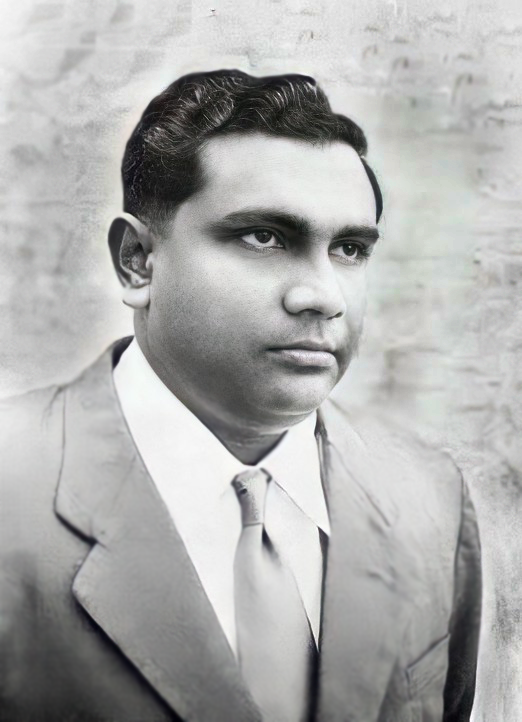
- Nasir in 1978

2nd President of the Maldives
- In office 11 November 1968 – 11 November 1978
- Prime Minister: Ahmed Zaki (1972–1975)
- Vice President: Abdul Sattar Moosa Didi; Ahmed Hilmy Didi; Ibrahim Shihab; Ali Maniku; Hassan Zareer (1975–1977)
- Preceded by: Office established
- Succeeded by: Maumoon Abdul Gayoom

8th Prime Minister of the Maldives
- In office 12 December 1957 – 11 November 1968
- Monarch: Muhammad Fareed Didi
- Preceded by: Ibrahim Ali Didi
- Succeeded by: Ahmed Zaki

Minister of Interior
- In office 18 August 1957 – 17 August 1960
- Monarch: Muhammad Fareed Didi
- Preceded by: Mohamed Amin Didi
- Succeeded by: Umar Zahir

Minister of Finance
- In office 14 December 1957 – 11 November 1968
- Monarch: Muhammad Fareed Didi
- Preceded by: Ibrahim Ali Didi
- Succeeded by: Abdul Sattar Moosa Didi

Personal details
- Born: 2 September 1926 Fuvahmulah, Maldive Islands
- Died: 22 November 2008 (aged 82) Mount Elizabeth Hospital, Singapore
- Resting place: Malé Friday Mosque, Malé, Maldives; 04°10′41″N 73°30′45″E
- Party: Independent
- Spouse(s): Aishath Zubair(Thuthon Goma) (m. 1950) Mariyam Saeed (m. 1953) Naseema Mohamed (m. 1963)
- Relations: Salahuddin family (by marriage)
- Children: Ahmed Nasir, Ali Nasir, Ismail Nasir, Aishath Nasir and Mohamed Nasir
- Parents: Velaanaage Ahmed Didi (father); Aishath Moosa Didi (mother)
- Education: Madharusathul Salahiyya
- Awards: Full list

Al Ameer Ibrahim Nasir Rannabandeyri Kilegefan (Arabic: إبراهيم ناصر; Dhivehi: އަލްއަމީރް އިބްރާހިމް ނާޞިރު ރަންނަބަނޑޭރި ކިލޭގެފާނު; 2 September 1926 – 22 November 2008), KCMG, NGIV commonly known as Ibrahim Nasir, was a Maldivian politician who served as the Prime Minister of the Maldives from 1957 to 1968 under the monarchy, and later the first President of the Second Republic of Maldives from 1968 to 1978. Nasir served two terms (one term consisting of 5 years), then he decided to retire, even though the People's Majlis voted him in for a third term. Nasir adhered to the non-aligned ideology and was a staunch anti-imperialist. Nasir is remembered as an independence hero for guiding the Maldives to independence from the British Empire, he is also credited for establishing the tourism industry in the Maldives, as well as rapidly modernizing and developing the country and economy.

== Early life ==
Ibrahim Nasir was born on 2 September 1926 in Fuvahmulah, Maldives, to Ahmad Didi of Velaanaage from Male' and Nayaage Aishath Didi from Fuvahmulah. Nasir is descended from the royal houses Huraa from his paternal side and Dhiyamigili from his maternal side. Nasir's mother, Aishath Didi, was the daughter of Moosa Didi, son of Dhadimagu Ganduvaru Maryam Didi, daughter of Hussain Didi, son of Al-Nabeel Karayye Hassan Didi, son of Prince Ibrahim Faamuladheyri Kilegefan, son of Sultan Muhammed Ghiya'as ud-din, son of Sultan Ibrahim Iskandar II, son of Sultan Muhammad Imaduddin II of the Dhiyamigili dynasty.

Nasir would spend his childhood in Fuvahmulah, after which Nasir's family moved to Malé, where he began studying and attended Madharusathul Salahiyya, which later became Majeediyya School in 1969. After finishing his studies in Malé, he would spend more time studying in Sri Lanka, before he returned to Malé and began his political career and rapidly climbed the political ladder.

Nasir was married three times and had five children. His first wife was Aisha Zubair (Tuttudon Goma), whom he married in 1950. They had a son named Ahmed Nasir. In 1953, he married Mariyam Saeeda Didi, with whom he had two sons, Ali Nasir and Mohamed Nasir. In 1969, Nasir married Naseema Mohamed Kaleyfan, with whom he had a son and a daughter, Ismail Nasir and Aishath Nasir, respectively.

== Premiership ==
Ibrahim Nasir served as the prime minister under the reign of Muhammad Fareed Didi from 12 December 1957, until the former was sworn in as the first President of the Second Republic of Maldives. He was also the Minister of Finance from December 1957 to November 1968. Nasir favoured neutrality during his premiership and later presidency. Nasir was keen on expelling the British from RAF Gan and seeking independence from them. Nasir also did not want to give this base to the Soviets who contacted him about it later during his presidency.

Upon achieving independence in 1965, the Maldives was invited to join the Commonwealth of Nations. Nasir declined this invitation due to Nasir seeing the Commonwealth as being an organization under the British Empire. The Maldives would however go on to join the Commonwealth of Nations during Maumoon's tenure in 1982.

The events in Thinadhoo under President Ibrahim Nasir’s administration in the 1960s are among the darkest chapters in Maldivian history. Following the end of the short-lived United Suvadive Republic (1959-1963), Nasir’s government undertook a brutal campaign to suppress dissent in Thinadhoo, one of the key islands involved in the secessionist movement. Reports suggest that government forces launched an attack on the island in 1962, resulting in widespread violence. Homes were burned, and many residents were forcibly evacuated or killed, marking what some historians and locals refer to as a massacre. This crackdown effectively erased Thinadhoo as a functioning community for years and instilled fear across the Maldives, reinforcing central control under Nasir’s rule. The events remain a painful memory for many and continue to provoke debates about justice and accountability in Maldivian history.

Although Nasir preferred to keep a cordial relationship with the nations of the world, both Nasir's premiership and presidency was marked with by a strained relationship with the Maldives' former colonial overlord.

Less than two months after securing independence, Nasir secured membership in the United Nations (UN) on 21 September 1965, against the opposition of countries that did not feel that the UN was the place for small states. The Maldives was the first state of its size (a population less than 80,000 in 1965) to be admitted to the UN. At the time, small states that had long been independent such as San Marino and Monaco had not been admitted to the UN. Western Samoa which became independent only a few years prior to the Maldivian independence also was not admitted to the UN. The flag of the Maldives was raised at the UN headquarters on 12 October 1965.

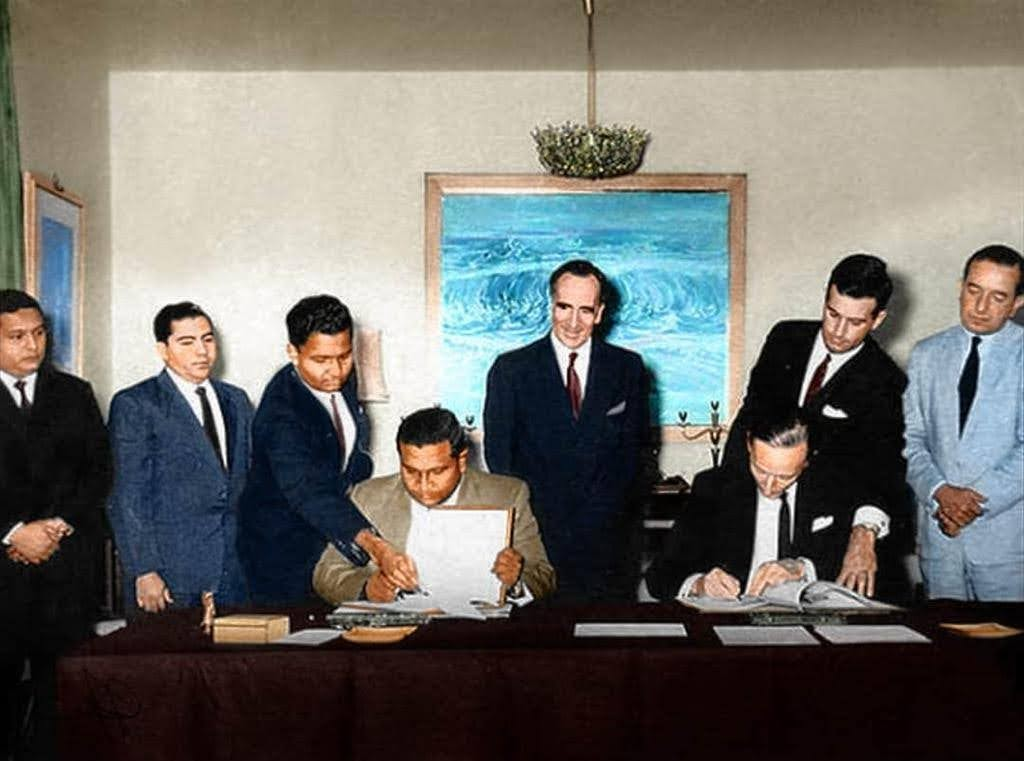
Prime Minister Ibrahim Nasir signs independence agreement with the British on 26 July 1965.

== Tourism industry ==
The tourism industry began to develop during Nasir's tenure when the government at the time made efforts to diversify the economy beyond fishing and agriculture, Nasir believed the revenue would help boost the economy and modernize the country. Although the United Nations mission at the time advised against it. However, in 1972, the first resort, Kurumba Island Resort was opened, the second resort Bandos Island Resort was personally developed and opened by Nasir, and he also personally set-up the first tourist agency known as "Crescent Tourist Agency". Ever since tourism has flourished and become the most important industry in the Maldives. During the 50 Golden Year of Tourism anniversary event in 2022, Nasir was awarded a special award (accepted by the Nasir family) and recognition for his part in founding the tourism industry in the Maldives.

== Presidency ==
Ibrahim Nasir was sworn in as the second President of the independent Republic of Maldives on 11 November 1968. Nasir pursued a non-aligned policy as president. His foreign policy involved establishing and maintaining positive relations with nations around the globe, Nasir believed that investing into tourism would both help the development of the country as well as further his foreign policy. In 1976, the Maldives officially joined the Non-Aligned Movement.

He was credited with many other improvements such as introducing an English-based modern curriculum to government-run schools. He brought television and radio to the country with formation of Television Maldives and Radio Maldives for broadcasting radio signals nationwide. He abolished Vaaru, a tax on the people living on islands outside Malé, as well as many other taxes on various imports to the country, some of which have been since reinstated. When Nasir relinquished power, Maldives was debt-free to the international community, and corruption was effectively under control. Under his watch, the national shipping line with more than 40 ships that were plying the oceans of the world remained a source of national pride for Maldivians. It was a remarkable success story among the maritime nations of South Asia.

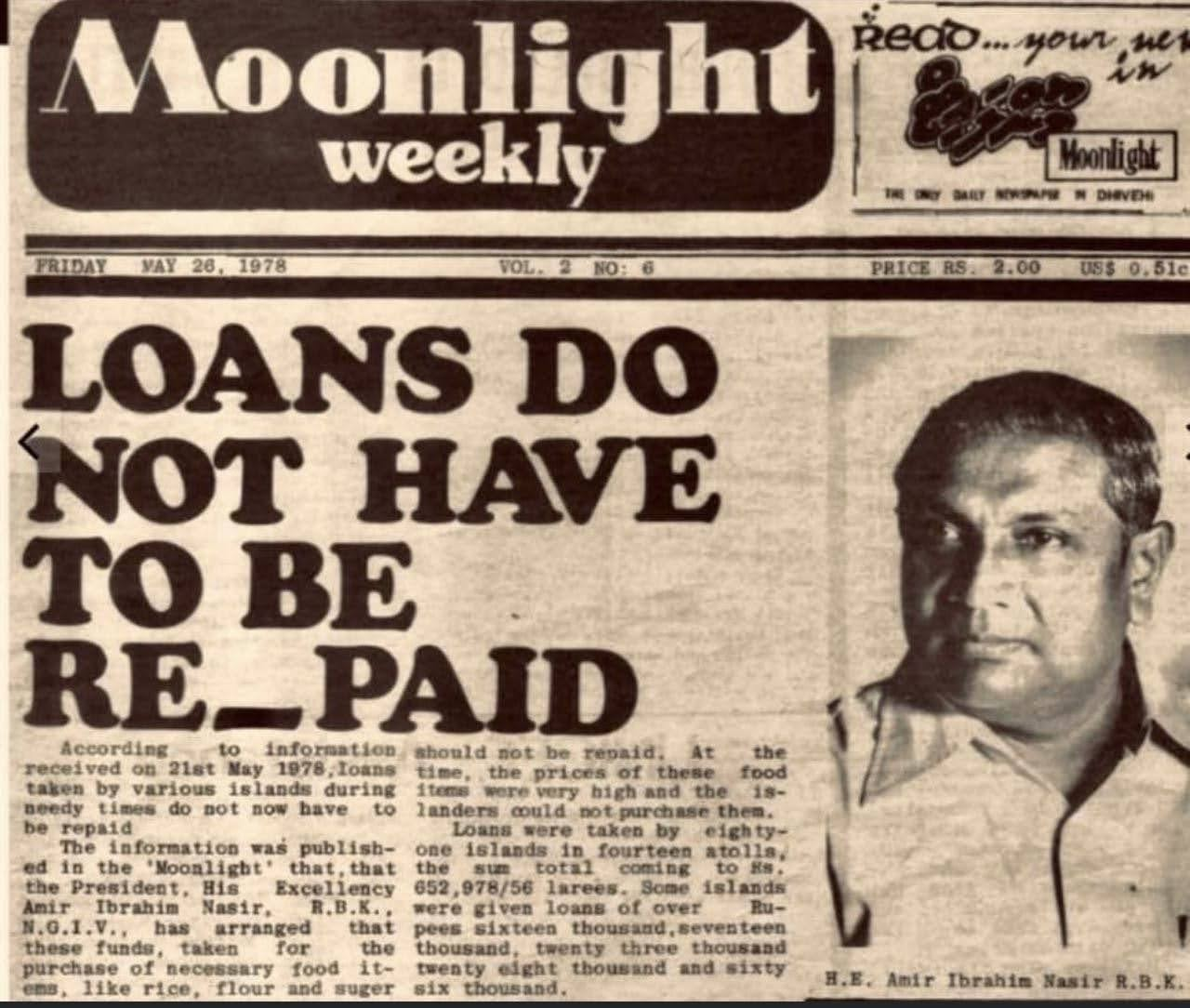
President Ibrahim Nasir forgives loans taken by islanders to purchase necessities such as food during turbulent economic times.

His tenure was characterized by significant progress in the country's industrial and economic sector, while also heavily modernizing and industrialising the country. Among the notable achievements during his administration was starting the tourism industry which brought about an economic boom and placed the Maldives on the map as well as the construction of Hulhulé airport (now Velana International Airport), which is commonly regarded as the first airport in the Maldives, despite the existence of a previous airport in Addu called RAF Gan (Royal Air Force Station Gan) built by the British Empire during their protectorate of Maldives.

Some notable achievements during Nasir's rule:

- Attaining political independence for the country on 26 July 1965.
- Securing membership at the United Nations on 21 September 1965, thus gaining worldwide recognition.
- Starting an English language intermediate education program (March 1961)
- Starting A-level education (1976)
- Initiating the Atoll Education Center project and opening the first center (Eydhafushi, 1977)
- Women permitted to vote in Maldives (1964)
- Starting nursing training (1963)
- Opening health centers in all atolls (starting with Naifaru, 1965)
- Opening the second modern hospital (October 1967), the first was built in RAF Gan (1957) in Addu of Southern Maldives by British Empire, which is now a dive center.
- Building the second airport (April 1966), the first one being RAF Gan in Addu of Southern Maldives built by British Empire which is now Gan International Airport.
- Starting the tourism industry (March 1972)
- First motorised fishing boat built (In Hulhule' boatyard, July 1964)
- Modernising the fisheries industry with mechanised vessels (engines became available for private fishing vessels; 1974)
- Felivaru fish canning factory opened (February 1978)
- Incorporating Maldives Shipping Limited (MSL; 1967)

On 26 July 2015, to mark 50 years of independence, Nasir was awarded the 50th Independence Day Shield of Honour (accepted by the Nasir family), in recognition of his contribution to achieving independence as well as development of the Maldives post independence.

Nasir's hasty introduction of the Latin alphabet (Malé Latin) in 1976 instead of local Thaana script – reportedly to allow for the use of telex machines in the local administration – was widely criticised. Clarence Maloney, a Maldives-based U.S. anthropologist, lamented the inconsistencies of the "Dhivehi Latin" which ignored all previous linguistic research on the Maldivian language and did not follow the modern Standard Indic transliteration. At the time of the romanization every island's officials were required to use only one script. The Thaana script was reinstated by President Gayoom shortly after he took power in 1978. However, Malé Latin continues to be widely used as the default romanization of Dhivehi.

== Havaru Thinadhoo rebellions and depopulation ==
During his tenure as Prime Minister of the Sultanate of Maldives, Nasir was challenged in 1959 by a local secessionist movement in the three southernmost atolls that benefited economically from the British presence on Gan, because Nasir intended to cancel the Gan military agreement with the British. This group of islands consisting of Huvadu Atoll, Addu Atoll and Nasir's home island Fuvahmulah, cut ties with the Maldives government and formed an independent state, the United Suvadive Republic with Abdullah Afeef as president and Hithadhoo as its capital. The United Suvadive Republic had the backing of the British, however they changed their stance after Nasir sent gunboats from Malé, and Abdullah Afeef went into exile, which culminated in the controversial event of depopulation of Havaru Thinadhoo. This resulted in the forced evacuation of the island's entire population and the subsequent destruction of their homes and property. The incident has been criticized as a violation of human rights and a crime against humanity. While others have praised Nasir for his leadership and decisive action in ending the separatist movement for good and restoring national unity. Nevertheless, his involvement in the Thinadhoo incident remains a source of controversy and criticism for Nasir. In 1960, Nasir renegotiated the agreement with the United Kingdom, which allowed them to continue the operation and use both the Gan and the Hithadhoo facilities for thirty years, but now the British were required to pay £750,000 from 1960 to 1965 for the Maldives' economic development. The base was closed in 1976 as part of the larger British withdrawal of permanently-stationed forces 'East of Suez'.

== Post presidency ==
Nasir was succeeded by President Maumoon Abdul Gayoom who was then Minister of Transport and former permanent representative of the Maldives to the United States. The former president went into self-exile in Singapore on 7 December 1978 after resigning from his post. In 1981, Gayoom sentenced him to jail in absentia for alleged corruption charges and plotting a coup d'état; none of the allegations were proven and Nasir was pardoned.

Nasir was widely criticized during the Gayoom administration, especially during the early days of Gayoom's presidency. There were massive rallies in almost all the big islands of Maldives with indecent cartoons of Nasir organized by Gayoom's government, as well as cartoons of Nasir on the roads and in newspapers. Insulting anti-Nasir songs were recorded and distributed by the government, which were even played on national radio.

It is said that until Nasir left Malé, Gayoom praised and talked in favour of him (as in his first speech after being sworn in as president). However, after Nasir left Malé everything changed. Mass demonstrations were held against him, labeling him a traitor, and calling for his death. He was tried in absentia and sentenced. Gayoom led a massive demonstration against Nasir on 16 May 1980 and the 'crowd' to which Gayoom spoke (between 15,000 and 20,000 people attended, with the population of Malé then being about 35,000) in which he discussed his views about how Nasir came to power, how he had been one of the leaders in the overthrow of first president Mohamed Amin in 1953 and how he had allegedly mishandled government money. However, the allegations against Nasir were never proven. Gayoom later pardoned him in July 1990, but never granted permission for him to return to Maldives. This point turned out to be proven according to an interview given by Kuvaa Mohamed Maniku, a close associate of Nasir to Television Maldives on 23 November 2008, one day after Nasir's death. Maniku said he met President Nasir at Bangkok Airport in 1990 after Nasir had been pardoned by the government, and Nasir had told Maniku he had sent a letter to President Gayoom requesting permission to return to Maldives and to live anywhere in the country approved by him. According to Maniku, Nasir had told him that he had not received a reply from Gayoom.

== Awards ==
Nasir had received a total of five awards. He was awarded the Order of Ghazi but was later revoked by the Sultan of the Maldives. During Elizabeth II's visit to the Maldives in 1972, she awarded him the title Order of St Michael and St George. After his death, he was awarded the 50th Independence Day Shield of Honour and the 50 Golden Years of Tourism award.

== Death ==
On 22 November 2008, at the age of 82, Nasir died at Mount Elizabeth Hospital in Singapore. Though the cause of death is unknown, he had kidney problems which plagued him in the time before his death. Nasir's body was flown to the Maldives, where his body was displayed in Theemuge, the presidential palace in Malé, on 23 November. The day was declared a national holiday in the Maldives, and tens of thousands of Maldivians flocked to see Nasir's body. At the presidential palace, former President Mohamed Nasheed were among those who paid their respects to Nasir. His funeral prayer was led by Dr. Abdul Majeed Abdul Bari after the Fajr (dawn) prayers on Monday, 24 November 2008. After the funeral prayers, Nasir was laid to rest at dawn at the cemetery attached to the Friday Mosque (Hukuru Miskiy). Nasir was survived by three children, Ahmed Nasir, Ismail Nasir and Aishath Nasir, as well as his grandchildren Ibrahim Ahmed Nasir, Mohamed Nasir, Sameeh Ahmed Nasir and Samah Ahmed Nasir. His other two sons, Ali Nasir and Muhammad Nasir, had predeceased their father by several years.

Political offices
Preceded by None	President of the Maldives; 1968–1978	Succeeded by Maumoon Abdul Gayoom
Preceded by Ibrahim Ali Didi	Prime Minister of the Maldives; 1957–1968	Succeeded by Ahmed Zaki
