= Mohamed Amin Didi =

1st president of the Maldives

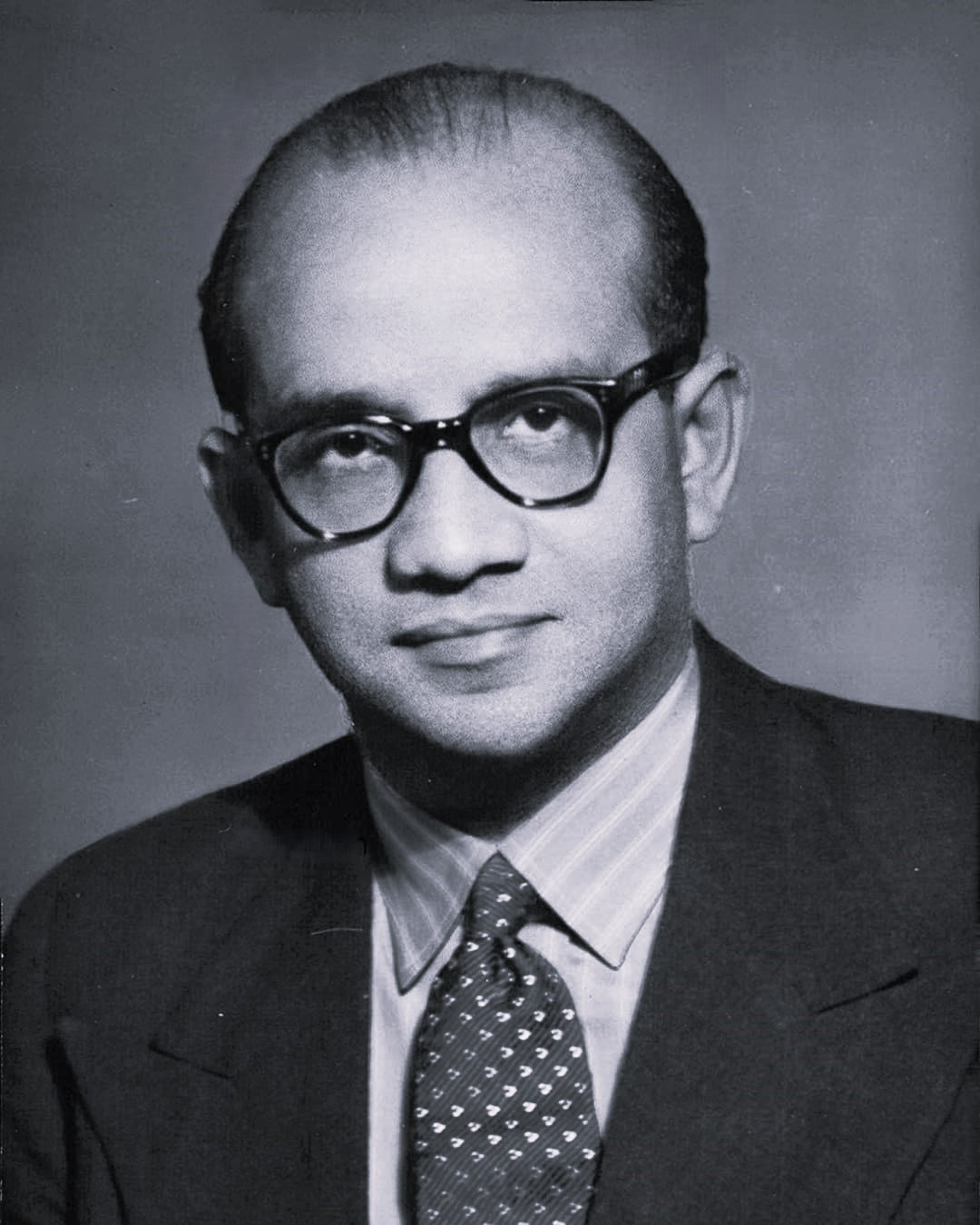
- Official portrait, 1950s

1st President of the Maldives
- In office 1 January 1953 – 21 August 1953
- Vice President: Ibrahim Muhammad Didi
- Preceded by: Office established
- Succeeded by: Ibrahim Muhammad Didi (Acting); Office abolished Sultanate of Maldives (Muhammad Fareed Didi)

Minister of Interior
- In office 7 April 1943 – 21 August 1953
- Monarchs: Hassan Nooraddeen II; Abdul Majeed Didi
- Preceded by: Hassan Fareed Didi
- Succeeded by: Ibrahim Nasir

Minister of Foreign Affairs
- In office 29 October 1944 – 21 August 1953
- Monarch: Abdul Majeed Didi
- Preceded by: Hassan Farid Didi
- Succeeded by: Ibrahim Ali Didi

Personal details
- Born: 20 July 1910 Athireege, Malé, Maldive Islands
- Died: 19 January 1954 (aged 43) Vihamanaafushi, Maldives
- Party: Peoples' Progressive Party
- Spouse: Fathimath Saeed
- Relations: Family of Mohamed Amin Didi
- Children: 3, including Ameena

Sumuvvul Ameer Mohamed Amin Dhoshimeynaa Kilegefaanu (Dhivehi: ސުމުއްވުލް އަމީރު މުހައްމަދު އަމީން ދޮށިމޭނާ ކިލެގެފާނު; 20 July 1910 – 19 January 1954), popularly known as Mohamed Amin Didi, was a Maldivian politician who served as the first president of the Maldives and as the head of government between 1 January 1953, and 21 August 1953. Amin Didi was also the principal of Majeedhiyya School from 1946 to 1953.

Amin Didi was the leader of the first political party in the Maldives, Rayyithunge Muthagaddim Party. His political program included efforts to modernize the country, including the advancement of women, education in the Maldives, nationalising the fish export industry and an unpopular ban on tobacco smoking.

Amin Didi took office during post World War II period, a time when the country was in widespread famine and exhausted resources.

== Early life ==
Amin was the son of Athireegey Ahmed Dhoshimeynaa kilegefaan and Roanugey Aishath Didi. He was a descendant of the Huraa Dynasty, from his father's side. In 1920, he went abroad to Ceylon (now Sri Lanka) and studied in Saint Joseph's College, Colombo. In 1928, he went to India for further studies in Aligarh Muslim University, returning to the Maldives one year later. His wife was Fathimath Saeed, and his only child was Annabeela Ameena Mohamed Amin

== Premiership ==
He was appointed as the prime minister on 1 January 1947 and left on 2 September 1953. During his time as prime minister, he wrote a promotional booklet titled ‘Ladies and Gentlemen: The Maldive Islands’, which provided foreigners information about the life, culture and economy about the Maldives.

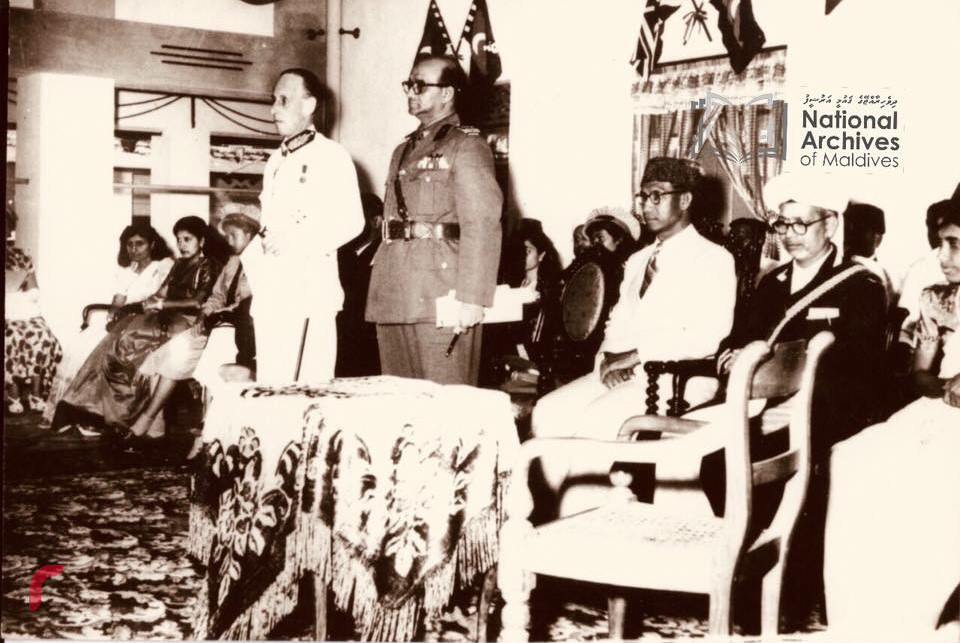
Amin Didi being inaugurated as president

== Politics ==
In 1931, Amin was appointed to the Constituent Assembly convened by Sultan Muhammad Shamsuddeen III to draft the country's first written constitution. He subsequently held various posts in the government, such as the Chief Officer of Customs, head of the Maldivian Post Office, and Minister of Trade, Minister of Finance (1942–1952), Mahkamat Al-Kharijiyya (Ministry of Foreign Affairs; 1944–1953), Vazeerul Ma'aarif (Minister of Education; 1933–1936; 1944–1952) and was also a member of the First Maldivian Parliament.

== Revolution ==
In a report by Mihaaru, it was revealed that Ibrahim Zaki, Mohamed Zaki and Ibrahim Nasir was the one staging the revolution and invited VP Ibrahim Muhammad Didi who then agreed to joined. Ibrahim Didi joined due to his distaste of Amin's handling of state funds. On the day of the revolution, he locked the door of the wireless office, announced the people they wanted to arrest, all of them being close associates of Amin. A special assembly was called and a no confidence vote was brought up against Amin Didi, which temporarily handed all powers to Ibrahim Didi. Amin, in Sri Lanka receiving medical treatment at the time didn't know what happened until he received a letter from Ibrahim Didi informing him about what happened but didn't tell him about his removal of power. Amin later arrived by flight to RAF Gan and headed to Malé where Ibrahim Didi and Faamludheyri Kilegefaanu took him to Dhoonidhoo where he ordered the Army to beat Amin. He later was taken to Vihamanaafushi where he died from health complications.

== Investigation on Amin's death ==
The Office of Ombudsperson for Transitional Justice accepted a case lodged with the office seeking justice for the death of Mohamed Amin Didi, which was submitted by the then Central Maafannu MP, Ibrahim Rasheed, in September 2021.

Rasheed said the case involves loss of fundamental human rights due to systemic abuse by state institutions. He said it needs to be made clearer how the state treated Amin. He has also requested to overturn Amin's conviction as a traitor.

Ameen served as President of Maldives for eight months – between January 1953 and August 1953. He was removed from power and banished to Vihamanaafushi Island – now Kurumba Island Resort – where he died in January 1954.

The Office of Ombudsperson for Transitional Justice was mandated with identifying and investigating systemic human rights violations by state institutions. However, the office has since expired on 19 November 2023 and faced multiple allegations of investigations not being investigated properly.

== Family ==
Amin Didi had one daughter, Annabeela Ameena Mohamed Amin. His grandson Ameen Faisal was the Minister of Defence and National Security of Maldives. His other grandchildren are Ibrahim Faisal, Farahanaz Faisal and Aishath Shuweykar. His mother's name was Aishath Didi his father's name was Ahmed Dhoshimeynaa Kileygefaanu.

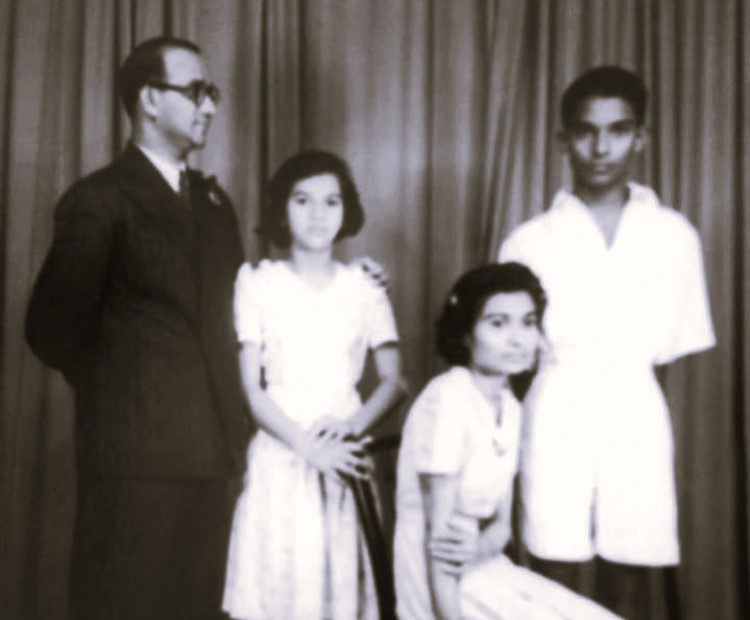
Amin Didi with his family in 1949

== Genealogy ==
Ibrahim Dhoshimeynaa Kilege Faan	Mariyam Didi	Roanuge' Ibrahim Didi	Galolhugey Amina Didi
Ahmed Dhoshimeynaa Kilege Faan	Roanuge' Aishaa Didi
Mohamed Amin Didi
