= Ministry of Homeland Security, Labour and Technology =

Government ministry of the Maldives

Ministry of Homeland Security, Labour & Technology
- ދާޚިލީ ސަލާމަތާއި މަސައްކަތްތެރިކަމާއި ފަންނިއްޔާތާ ބެހޭ ވުޒާރާ Dhaakhilee Salaamathaai Masakkaiytherikamaai Fanniyaathaa Behey Vuzaaraa

Agency overview
- Formed: December 22, 1932
- Jurisdiction: Government of the Maldives
- Headquarters: Velaanaage
- Annual budget: MVR 68.2 million (2024)
- Minister responsible: Ali Ihusaan
- Deputy Ministers responsible: Uz Hassaan Hameed, Deputy Minister of Homeland Security and Technology; Mohamed Rishmee, Deputy Minister of Homeland Security and Technology; Ahmed Aly, Deputy Minister of Homeland Security and Technology; Hussain Zeenee, Deputy Minister of Homeland Security and Technology; Arham Hussain, Deputy Minister of Homeland Security and Technology; Amaany Mohamed, Deputy Minister of Homeland Security and Technology
- Agency executives: Dr Mohamed Kinaanath, Minister of State for Homeland Security and Technology; Uz. Ahmed Siddeeq, Minister of State for Homeland Security and Technology; Uza. Lubna Mohamed Zahir Hussain, Minister of State for Homeland Security and Technology; Uz Yoosuf Abdul Ghafoor, Minister of State for Homeland Security and Technology
- Child agencies: Maldives Police Service; Maldives Correctional Service; Maldives Immigration; Maldives Customs Service; National Drug Agency; Department of Juvenile Justice; National Center for Information Technology; Department of National Registration; Labour Relations Authority; Communication Authority of Maldives; National Cyber Security Agency
- Website: mohst.gov.mv

The Ministry of Homeland Security, Labour & Technology, formerly known as the Ministry of Home Affairs and Ministry of Homeland Security & Technology is part of the Maldivian Executive branch responsible for maintaining law and order in the Maldives at the national level. It was introduced in 1932 after the Maldivian independence under president Ibrahim Nasir, the second president of Maldives.

== History ==
Ever since the first constitution came into effect, a Ministry of Home Affairs was instituted on 22 December 1932 under the name of "Al Wuzara Al’Dhaakhiliyya" which was mandated to oversee and execute the internal affairs of the country. Since its inception, it's been under the jurisdiction of the Al Wuzara Al’ Dhakhiliyya (The President's Office).

== Agencies ==
=== Maldives Police Service ===
Maldives Police Service was first introduced to Maldives under a law established on 29 March 1993 under president Maumoon Abdul Gayoom. The military was incharge to keep law and order before the establishment of the police department. The first police was introduced almost 70 years ago by Muhammad Shamsuddeen III.

=== Maldives Correctional Service ===
Maldives Correctional Service was founded on 31 December 2013 signed into law by president Abdulla Yameen. It is supposed to maintain the jail facilities and make the prisons a safer place for all inmates. It has been part of controversies that they don't give equal treatment for all inmates, though they have denied these claims.

== Ministers ==
This is a list of all the former names and ministers of the Homeland Ministry:

No.	Portrait	Name (born-died)	Term			Political party	Government	Ref.
No.	Portrait	Name (born-died)	Took office	Left office	Time in office	Political party	Government	Ref.
Ministry of Interior
1	Ahmed Kamil Didi	Ahmed Kamil Didi	22 December 1932	24 December 1933	1 year, 2 days	?	Shamsuddeen III	
2	Hassan Fareed Didi	Hassan Fareed Didi (1901–1944)	24 December 1933	6 April 1943	9 years, 103 days	?	Nooraddeen II	
3	Mohamed Amin Didi	Mohamed Amin Didi (1910–1954)	7 April 1943	21 August 1953	10 years, 75 days	?	Nooraddeen II; Abdul Majeed Didi	
4	Ibrahim Nasir	Ibrahim Nasir (1926–2008)	18 August 1957	17 August 1960	2 years, 365 days	Independent	Fareed I	
5	Ibrahim Rasheed	Ibrahim Rasheed (1928–2021)	18 August 1960	11 November 1968	8 years, 85 days	?	Fareed I	
Ministry of Home Affairs
5	Ibrahim Rasheed	Ibrahim Rasheed (1928–2021)	8 January 1977	11 November 1978	1 year, 307 days	?	Ibrahim Nasir	
Ministry of Home Affairs and Social Service
6	Umar Zahir	Umar Zahir (1936–2021)	11 November 1983	12 December 1988	5 years, 31 days	?	Maumoon	
Ministry of Home Affairs and Sports
6	Umar Zahir	Umar Zahir (1936–2021)	12 December 1988	11 November 1993	4 years, 336 days	?	Maumoon	
Ministry of Home Affairs
7	Abdulla Jameel	Abdulla Jameel	11 November 1993	6 November 1996	2 years, 361 days	?	Maumoon	
Ministry of Home Affairs and Housing
7	Abdulla Jameel	Abdulla Jameel	6 November 1996	11 November 1998	2 years, 5 days	?	Maumoon	
Ministry of Home Affairs, Housing and Environment
8	Ismail Shafeeu	Ismail Shafeeu (born 1956)	11 November 1998	9 October 2002	3 years, 332 days	?	Maumoon	
Ministry of Home Affairs and Environment
8	Ismail Shafeeu	Ismail Shafeeu (born 1956)	11 November 1993	1 September 2004	10 years, 295 days	?	Maumoon	
Ministry of Home Affairs
9	Umar Zahir	Umar Zahir (1936–2021)	1 September 2004	14 July 2005	316 days	?	Maumoon	
10	Ahmed Thasmeen Ali	Ahmed Thasmeen Ali (born 1966)	14 July 2005	25 June 2007	1 year, 346 days	DRP	Maumoon	
11	Abdulla Kamaaluhdheen	Abdulla Kamaaluhdheen	25 June 2007	12 November 2008	1 year, 140 days	DRP	Maumoon	
12	Qasim Ibrahim	Qasim Ibrahim (born 1951)	12 November 2008	4 December 2008	22 days	JP	Nasheed	
–	Ameen Faisal	Ameen Faisal; Acting	4 December 2008	3 June 2009	181 days	MDP	Nasheed	
13	Mohamed Shihab	Mohamed Shihab	3 June 2009	10 December 2010	1 year, 190 days	MDP	Nasheed	
14	Hassan Afeef	Hassan Afeef	10 December 2010	7 February 2012	1 year, 59 days	?	Nasheed	
15	Mohamed Jameel Ahmed	Mohamed Jameel Ahmed (born 1969)	8 February 2012	11 May 2013	1 year, 92 days	PPM	Waheed	
16	Ahmed Shafeeu	Ahmed Shafeeu; Acting	11 May 2013	17 November 2013	180 days	?	Waheed	
17	Umar Naseer	Umar Naseer (born 1967)	19 November 2013	21 June 2016	2 years, 215 days	PPM	Yameen	
18	Azleen Ahmed	Azleen Ahmed	1 August 2016	17 November 2018	2 years, 108 days	PPM	Yameen	
19	Imran Abdulla	Imran Abdulla	2 December 2018	17 November 2023	4 years, 350 days	AP	Solih	
Ministry of Homeland Security and Technology
20	Ali Ihusaan	Ali Ihusaan	17 November 2023	14 April 2026	2 years, 148 days	PNC	Muizzu	
Ministry of Homeland Security, Labour and Technology
20	Ali Ihusaan	Ali Ihusaan	14 April 2026	Incumbent	123 days	PNC	Muizzu	

== See also ==
- Ministry of Defence (Maldives)
- Ministry of Tourism (Maldives)
- Ministry of Education (Maldives)
