= Ministry of Social and Family Development (Maldives) =

Maldivian government ministry

- އިޖުތިމާޢީ އަދި ޢާއިލީ ތަރައްޤީއާ ބެހޭ ވުޒާރާ

Ministry overview
- Formed: 17 November 2023
- Dissolved: 14 April 2026
- Jurisdiction: Government of the Maldives
- Headquarters: Umar Zahir Office Building, Hulhumalé, Maldives
- Website: gender.gov.mv

The Ministry of Social and Family Development (Dhivehi: އިޖުތިމާޢީ އަދި ޢާއިލީ ތަރައްޤީއާ ބެހޭ ވުޒާރާ) was a Maldivian government ministry tasked with protecting children, women, and elderly people. It is also tasked with investigating domestic violence.

== Ministers ==
No.	Portrait	Name (born-died)	Term			Political party	Government	Ref.
No.	Portrait	Name (born-died)	Took office	Left office	Time in office	Political party	Government	Ref.
Ministry of Gender, Family and Human Rights
1	Fathimath Dhiyana Saeed	Fathimath Dhiyana Saeed (born 1972)	7 May 2012	19 November 2012	196 days	MDP	Waheed	
-	Mariyam Shakeela	Mariyam Shakeela; Acting	21 November 2012	07 March 2013	106 days	?	Waheed	
-	Aishath Azima Shakoor	Aishath Azima Shakoor (born 1969); Acting	07 March 2013	10 April 2013	34 days	?	Waheed	
2	Aishath Azima Shakoor	Aishath Azima Shakoor (born 1969)	10 April 2013	1 July 2013	82 days	?	Waheed	
3	Amal Ali	Amal Ali	09 July 2013	17 November 2013	131 days	?	Waheed	
Ministry of Gender and Family
4	Aminath Zenysha Shaheed Zaki	Aminath Zenysha Shaheed Zaki	22 June 2016	17 November 2018	2 years, 148 days	?	Yameen	
Ministry of Gender, Family, and Social Services
5	Shidhatha Shareef	Shidhatha Shareef	17 November 2018	06 February 2020	1 year, 81 days	AP	Solih	
6	Aishath Mohamed Didi	Aishath Mohamed Didi	06 February 2020	17 November 2023	3 years, 284 days	MDP	Solih	
Ministry of Social and Family Development
7	Aishath Shiham	Aishath Shiham (born 1964)	06 February 2023	14 April 2026	2 years, 148 days	PNC	Muizzu	
