= Ahmed Kamil Didi =

Maldivian politician

- އަޙްމަދު ކާމިލް ދީދީ
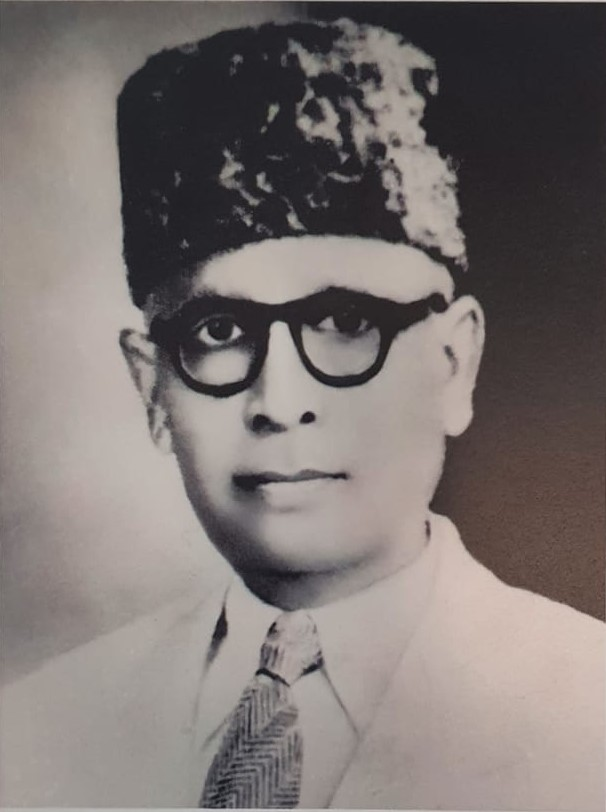
- Didi as the Minister of Education

Attorney General
- In office 28 May 1951 – 30 May 1956
- Monarchs: Abdul Majeed Didi; Muhammad Fareed Didi
- President: Mohamed Amin Didi
- Preceded by: Abdul Gayoom Ibrahim
- Succeeded by: Mohamed Jameel Didi
- In office 31 January 1942 – 29 October 1944
- Monarchs: Hassan Nooraddeen II; Abdul Majeed Didi
- Preceded by: Ibrahim Luthfee
- Succeeded by: Mohamed Nasir Manik

2nd Speaker of the People's Majlis
- In office 27 June 1942 – 29 October 1944
- Preceded by: Muhammad Fareed Didi
- Succeeded by: ibrahim Ali Didi

Minister of Education
- In office 22 December 1932 – 22 September 1953
- Monarch: Muhammad Shamsuddeen III
- Succeeded by: Mohamed Amin Didi

Minister of Home Affairs
- In office 22 December 1932 – 24 December 1933
- Monarch: Muhammad Shamsuddeen III
- Succeeded by: Hassan Fareed Didi

Ahmed Kamil Didi (Dhivehi: އަޙްމަދު ކާމިލް ދީދީ; also spelled as Kaamil) is a Maldivian politician who served as the first Minister of Education of the Maldives from 1932 to 1933 and as the Minister of Home Affairs.

== Biography ==
Didi was part of the first cabinet of the Maldives as the Minister of Education and the Minister of Home Affairs, serving both portfolios from 1932 to 1933. During his time as the Minister of Education, Didi worked to improve the literacy rates and implement relevant education laws pursuant to the then 1932 Constitution of the Maldives. He also started to teach girls in Madrasatul Saniyya (now Aminiya School).

In January 1942, Didi was appointed as the Attorney General and in June, he was appointed as the Speaker of the People's Majlis. He resigned from both offices on 29 October 1944. He later became the Attorney General again in 1951 until 1956.

A school in Hulhumalé Phase 2 called the "Kaamil Didi Primary School" was named after Didi.
