= Attorney General (Maldives) =

Legal advisor to the government of the Maldives

Attorney General of Maldives
- ބަންޑާރަނައިބު

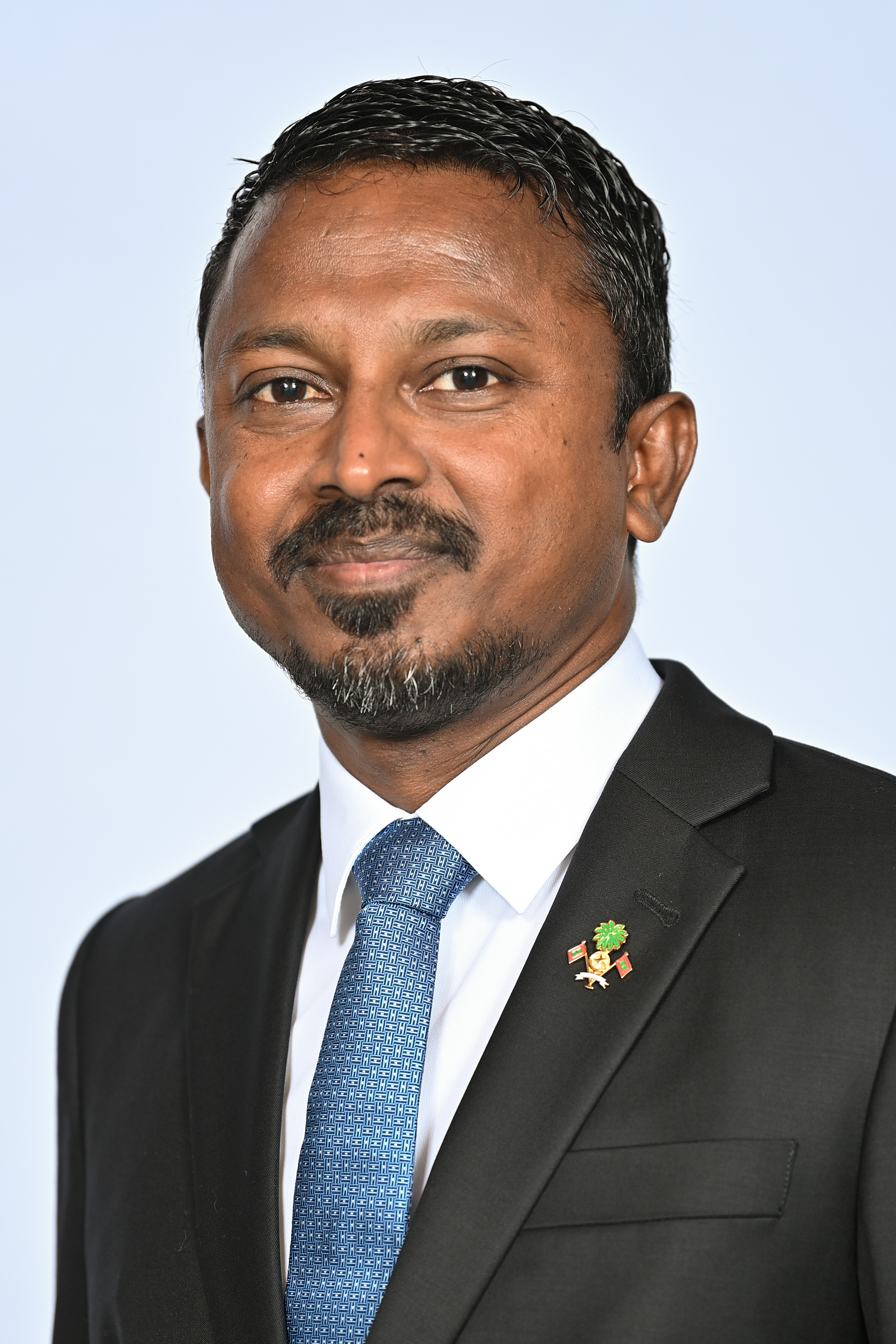
- Incumbent; Ahmed Usham since 17 November 2023
- Judiciary of the Maldives
- Style: The Honorable; Bandaaranaibu
- Abbreviation: AG
- Residence: Malé
- Seat: Velaanaage
- Appointer: President of the Maldives
- Term length: At the pleasure of the president
- Constituting instrument: Constitution of the Maldives
- Formation: 1932
- First holder: Hussain Salahuddin
- Website: agoffice.gov.mv/en

The position of Attorney General of the Maldives was created in 1932 under Sultan Muhammad Shamsuddeen III. It is responsible in upholding the law within a secure and a peace environment and defend the public interest. He is also designated as a member of the Cabinet of the Maldives.

From 2014 to 2016, the Attorney General's office was part of the Ministry of Law and Gender, with Attorney General Mohamed Anil in charge of the ministry.

Azima Shukoor was the longest serving Attorney General since 1993.

== Attorneys General list ==
No.	Portrait	Name (Born-Died)	Term			Political Party	Government	Ref.
No.	Portrait	Name (Born-Died)	Took office	Left office	Time in office	Political Party	Government	Ref.
1	Hussain Salahuddin	Hussain Salahuddin (1881–1948)	23 December 1900	17 December 1928	27 years, 360 days	?	Imaduddeen VI; Shamsuddeen III	
2	Abdullah Kamaluddin	Abdullah Kamaluddin	17 December 1928	22 December 1932	4 years, 5 days	?	Shamsuddeen III	
3	Ibrahim Rushdhee	Ibrahim Rushdhee	16 December 1932	09 November 1933	328 days	?	Shamsuddeen III	
4	Abdullah Kamaluddin	Abdullah Kamaluddin	27 January 1934	18 September 1939	5 years, 234 days	?	Shamsuddeen III; Nooraddeen II	
5	Ibrahim Rushdhee	Ibrahim Rushdhee	18 September 1939	30 September 1940	1 year, 12 days	?	Nooraddeen II	
6	Ibrahim Luthfee	Ibrahim Luthfee	30 September 1940	31 January 1942	1 year, 123 days	?	Nooraddeen II	
7	Ahmed Kamil Didi	Ahmed Kamil Didi	31 January 1942	29 October 1944	2 years, 272 days	?	Nooraddeen II; Abdul Majeed Didi	
8	Mohamed Nasir Manik	Mohamed Nasir Manik	29 October 1944	23 August 1950	5 years, 298 days	?	Abdul Majeed Didi	
9	Abdul Gayoom Ibrahim	Abdul Gayoom Ibrahim (1897–1982)	23 August 1950	17 May 1951	267 days	?	Abdul Majeed Didi	
10	Ahmed Kamil Didi	Ahmed Kamil Didi	28 May 1951	30 May 1956	5 years, 2 days	?	Abdul Majeed Didi; Mohamed Amin Didi; Fareed I	
11	Mohamed Jameel Didi	Mohamed Jameel Didi (1915–1989)	30 May 1956	11 September 1956	104 days	?	Fareed I	
12	Adnan Hussain	Adnan Hussain	26 September 1956	01 August 1959	2 years, 309 days	?	Fareed I	
13	Ibrahim Shihab	Ibrahim Shihab (1922–1988)	03 August 1959	08 March 1975	15 years, 217 days	?	Fareed I Ibrahim Nasir	
14	Adnan Hussain	Adnan Hussain	08 March 1975	11 August 1981	6 years, 156 days	?	Ibrahim Nasir; Maumoon	
15	Ahmed Zaki	Ahmed Zaki (1931–1996)	11 November 1983	22 February 1990	6 years, 103 days	?	Maumoon	
16	Ahmed Zahir	Ahmed Zahir (born 1945)	22 February 1990	27 March 1991	1 year, 33 days	?	Maumoon	
17	Mohamed Munavvar	Mohamed Munavvar (born 1961)	11 November 1993	11 November 2003	10 years, 0 days	?	Maumoon	
18	Hassan Saeed	Hassan Saeed	11 November 2003	05 August 2007	3 years, 267 days	?	Maumoon	
19	Aishath Azima Shakoor	Aishath Azima Shakoor (born 1969)	31 October 2007	11 November 2008	1 year, 11 days	?	Maumoon	
20	Fathimath Dhiyana Saeed	Fathimath Dhiyana Saeed (born 1972)	12 November 2008	18 May 2009	187 days	MDP	Nasheed	
-	Ali Hashim	Ali Hashim; Acting	19 May 2009	02 June 2009	14 days	?	Nasheed	
21	Husnu Al Suood	Husnu Al Suood (born 1967)	02 June 2009	29 June 2010	1 year, 27 days	?	Nasheed	
21	Husnu Al Suood	Husnu Al Suood (born 1967)	07 July 2010	29 June 2010	1 year, 27 days	?	Nasheed	
22	Ahmed Ali Sawad	Ahmed Ali Sawad	12 August 2010	10 December 2010	120 days	?	Nasheed	
-	Hassan Latheef	Hassan Latheef; Acting	11 December 2010	13 December 2010	2 days	MDP	Nasheed	
23	Ahmed Ali Sawad	Ahmed Ali Sawad	13 December 2010	21 March 2011	98 days	?	Nasheed	
24	Ahmed Muiz	Ahmed Muiz	21 March 2011	08 February 2012	324 days	?	Nasheed	
25	Aishath Azima Shakoor	Aishath Azima Shakoor (born 1969)	12 February 2012	10 April 2013	1 year, 57 days	?	Waheed	
26	Aishath Bisam	Aishath Bisam	10 April 2013	01 July 2013	82 days	?	Waheed	
27	Aishath Azima Shakoor	Aishath Azima Shakoor (born 1969)	01 July 2013	29 October 2013	120 days	?	Waheed	
28	Mohamed Anil	Mohamed Anil	21 November 2013	16 November 2018	4 years, 360 days	?	Yameen	
29	Ibrahim Riffath	Ibrahim Riffath	17 November 2018	16 November 2023	4 years, 364 days	?	Solih	
30	Ahmed Usham	Ahmed Usham	17 November 2023	Incumbent	2 years, 293 days	?	Muizzu	
