= Minister of Foreign Affairs (Maldives) =

Maldivian government minister

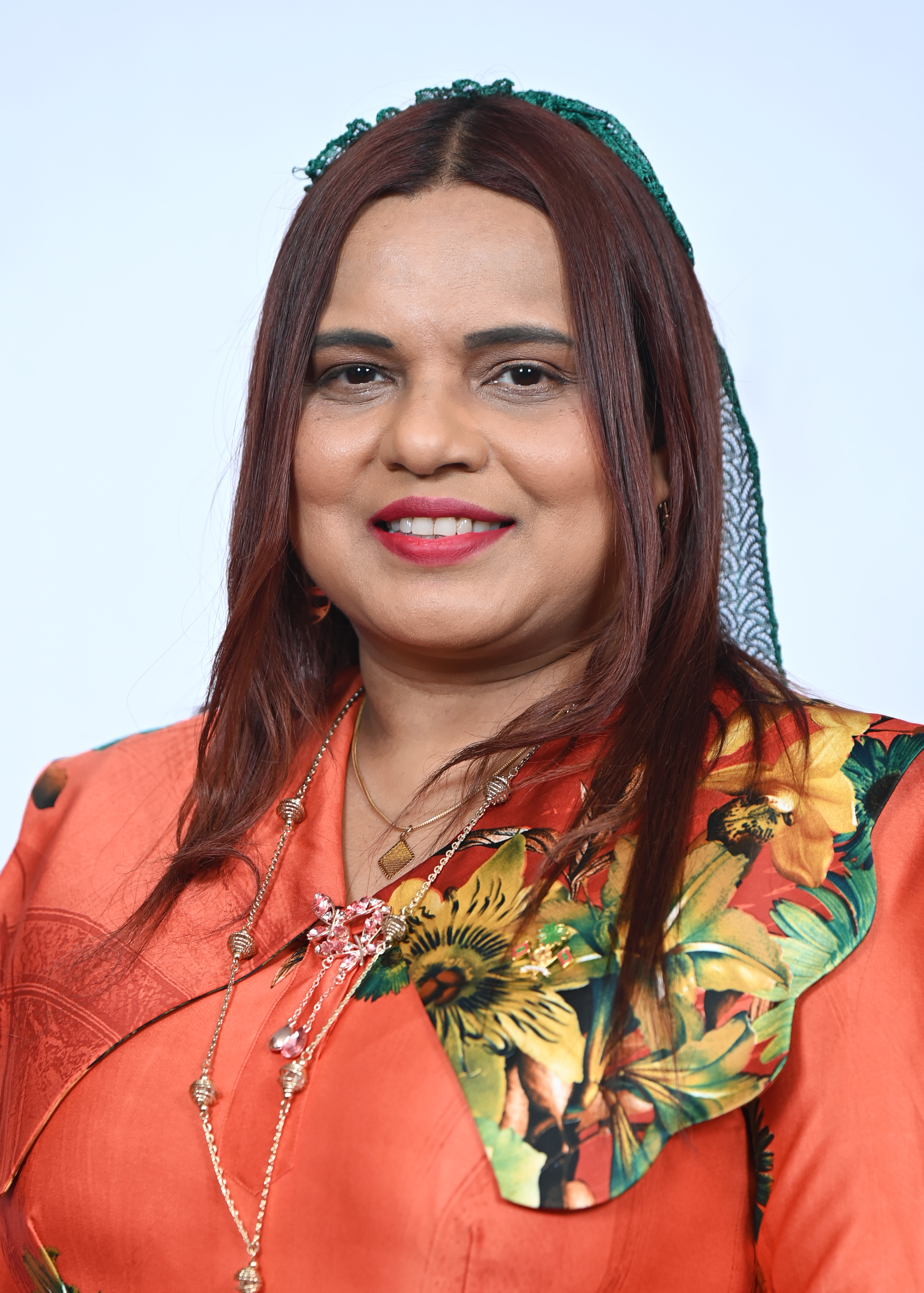
- Incumbent; Iruthisham Adam since 2026
- Member of: Cabinet of the Maldives
- Reports to: President of the Maldives
- Appointer: President of the Maldives
- Term length: 5 years
- Inaugural holder: Hassan Farid Didi

Minister of Foreign Affairs of the Republic of Maldives is a cabinet minister in charge of the Ministry of Foreign Affairs of Maldives, responsible for conducting foreign relations of the country.

== List of Foreign ministers ==
The following is a list of foreign ministers of Maldives since 1932:

| No. | Portrait | Name (Born-Died) | Term | | | Political Party | Government | Ref. |
| No. | Portrait | Name (Born-Died) | Took office | Left office | Time in office | Political Party | Government | Ref. |
|---|---|---|---|---|---|---|---|---|
| 1 | Hassan Farid Didi | Hassan Farid Didi (1901–1944) | 22 December 1932 | 31 March 1944 | 11 years, 100 days | ? | Shamsuddeen III | |
| 2 | Mohamed Amin Didi | Mohamed Amin Didi (1910–1954) | 29 October 1944 | 21 August 1953 | 8 years, 296 days | ? | Abdul Majeed Didi | |
| 3 | Ibrahim Ali Didi | Ibrahim Ali Didi (1889–1975) | 11 March 1954 | 11 December 1957 | 3 years, 275 days | ? | Fareed I | |
| 4 | Ibrahim Nasir | Ibrahim Nasir (1926–2008) | 12 December 1957 | 11 November 1968 | 10 years, 335 days | ? | Fareed I | |
| 5 | Ahmed Zaki | Ahmed Zaki (1931–1996) | 11 November 1968 | 01 August 1972 | 3 years, 264 days | ? | Ibrahim Nasir | |
| 5 | Ahmed Zaki | Ahmed Zaki (1931–1996) | 25 February 1975 | 06 March 1975 | 9 days | ? | Ibrahim Nasir | |
| 6 | Fathulla Jameel | Fathulla Jameel (1942–2012) | 14 March 1978 | 14 July 2005 | 27 years, 122 days | ? | Ibrahim Nasir; Maumoon | |
| 7 | Ahmed Shaheed | Ahmed Shaheed (born 1964) | 14 July 2005 | 21 August 2007 | 2 years, 38 days | ? | Maumoon | |
| 8 | Abdulla Shahid | Abdulla Shahid (born 1962) | 23 August 2007 | 10 November 2008 | 3 years, 79 days | DRP | Maumoon | |
| 9 | Ahmed Shaheed | Ahmed Shaheed (born 1964) | 12 November 2008 | 29 June 2010 | 1 year, 229 days | MDP | Nasheed | |
| 9 | Ahmed Shaheed | Ahmed Shaheed (born 1964) | 07 July 2010 | 11 December 2010 | 157 days | MDP | Nasheed | |
| 9 | Ahmed Shaheed | Ahmed Shaheed (born 1964) | 07 July 2010 | 11 December 2010 | 157 days | MDP | Nasheed | |
| - | Mohamed Aslam | Mohamed Aslam; Acting | 14 December 2010 | 21 March 2011 | 97 days | MDP | Nasheed | |
| 10 | Ahmed Naseem | Ahmed Naseem (born 1948) | 21 March 2011 | 7 February 2012 | 323 days | MDP | Nasheed | |
| 11 | Abdul Samad Abdulla | Abdul Samad Abdulla (1946–2013) | 5 March 2012 | 25 August 2013 | 1 year, 173 days | ? | Waheed | |
| - | Asim Ahmed | Asim Ahmed (born 1963); Acting | 25 August 2013 | 12 September 2013 | 18 days | ? | Waheed | |
| - | Mariyam Shakeela | Mariyam Shakeela (born 1961); Acting | 12 September 2013 | 17 November 2013 | 66 days | ? | Waheed | |
| 12 | Dunya Maumoon | Dunya Maumoon (born 1970) | 17 November 2013 | 5 July 2016 | 2 years, 231 days | PPM | Yameen | |
| 13 | Mohamed Asim | Mohamed Asim (born 1960) | 15 July 2016 | 17 November 2013 | 2 years, 125 days | ? | Yameen | |
| 14 | Abdulla Shahid | Abdulla Shahid (born 1962) | 17 November 2018 | 17 November 2023 | 5 years, 0 days | MDP | Solih | |
| 15 | Moosa Zameer | Moosa Zameer | 17 November 2023 | 30 September 2024 | 318 days | PNC | Muizzu | |
| 16 | Abdulla Khaleel | Abdulla Khaleel (born 1975) | 30 September 2024 | 14 April 2026 | 1 year, 196 days | PNC | Muizzu | |
| 17 | Iruthisham Adam | Iruthisham Adam | 14 April 2026 | | 146 days | ? | Muizzu | |
