= Cabinet of Abdulla Yameen =

Government of the Maldives from 2013 to 2018

Yameen Cabinet
- Cabinet of the Maldives

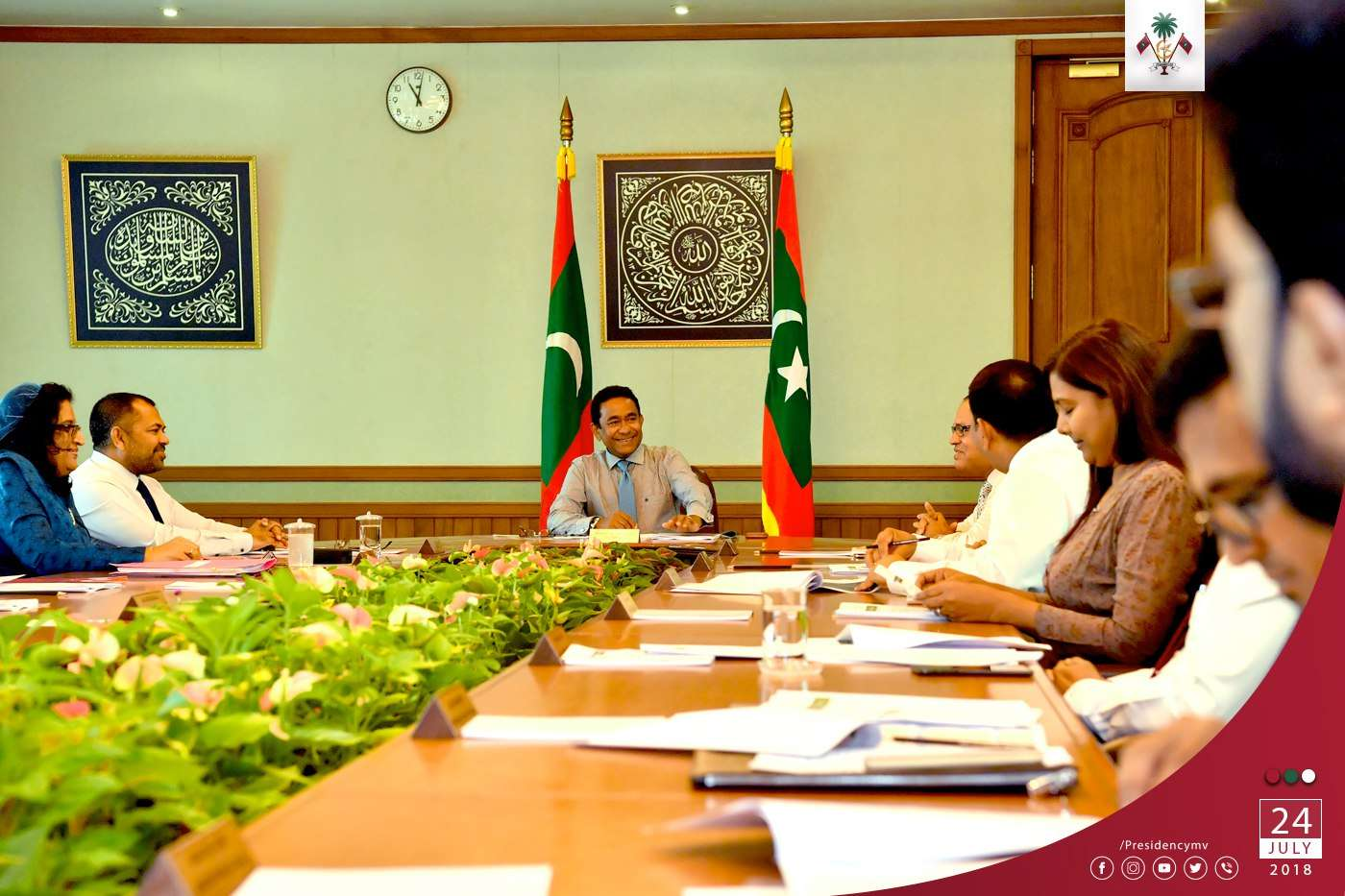
- Yameen's Cabinet pictured in a meeting in July 2018
- Date formed: 17 November 2013
- Date dissolved: 17 November 2018

People and organisations
- President: Abdulla Yameen
- President's history: Minister of Tourism and Civil Aviation (2008–2008); Minister of Higher Education (2005–2007)
- Vice President: Mohamed Jameel Ahmed (2013–2015); Ahmed Adeeb (2015); Abdulla Jihad (2016-2018)
- No. of ministers: 17 (including AG)
- Ministers removed: 16
- Member party: Progressive Party of Maldives
- Opposition parties: Maldivian Democratic Party; Jumhooree Party
- Opposition leaders: Mohamed Nasheed; Ibrahim Mohamed Solih; Qasim Ibrahim; Maumoon Abdul Gayoom

History
- Election: 2013 Maldivian presidential election
- Advice and consent: People's Majlis
- Predecessor: Waheed Cabinet
- Successor: Solih Cabinet

The Cabinet of Abdulla Yameen Abdul Gayoom was the most senior level of the executive branch of the Government of the Maldives from 2013 to 2018.

The Cabinet of Abdulla Yameen was selected following the inauguration of Abdulla Yameen Abdul Gayoom as President of the Maldives.

== Overview ==
Abdulla Yameen's cabinet comprised up of 17 members including the attorney general.

=== Composition ===
Position	Portrait	Name	Term in office		Ref
Position	Portrait	Name	Took office	Left office	Ref
President, Commander-in-Chief of the Armed Forces		Abdulla Yameen Abdul Gayoom	17 November 2013	17 November 2018	
Vice President		Abdulla Jihad	22 June 2016	17 November 2018	
Attorney General		Mohamed Anil	21 November 2013	17 November 2018	
Minister of Law and Gender		Mohamed Anil	1 July 2014	17 November 2018	
Minister of Defence and National Security		Adam Shareef	28 October 2015	17 November 2018	
Minister of Home Affairs		Azleen Ahmed	1 August 2016	17 November 2018	
Minister of Foreign Affairs		Mohamed Asim	13 July 2016	17 November 2018	
Minister of Islamic Affairs		Ahmed Ziyad Baqir	6 May 2015	17 November 2018	
Minister of Finance and Treasury		Ahmed Munawar	22 June 2016	17 November 2018	
Minister of Education		Aishath Shiham	21 November 2013	17 November 2018	
Minister of Health		Abdulla Nazim Ibrahim	22 June 2016	17 November 2018	
Minister of Tourism		Moosa Zameer	28 October 2015	17 November 2018	
Minister of Fisheries and Agriculture		Mohamed Shainee	19 November 2013	17 November 2018	
Minister of Economic Development		Mohamed Saeed	19 November 2013	17 November 2018	
Minister of Housing and Infrastructure		Mohamed Muizzu	19 November 2013	17 November 2018	
Minister of Environment and Energy		Thoriq Ibrahim	19 November 2013	17 November 2018	
Minister of Youth and Sports		Iruthisham Adam	22 June 2016	17 November 2018	
Minister of Gender and Family		Aminath Zenysha Shaheed Zaki	22 June 2016	17 November 2018	

=== Former Ministers ===
Position	Portrait	Name	Term in office		Replacement	Ref
Position	Portrait	Name	Took office	Left office	Replacement	Ref
Vice President		Mohamed Jameel Ahmed	17 November 2013	22 July 2015	Ahmed Adeeb	
Vice President		Ahmed Adeeb	22 July 2015	5 November 2015	Abdulla Jihad	
Minister of Tourism		Ahmed Adeeb	17 November 2013	22 July 2015	Moosa Zameer	
Minister of Defence and National Security		Mohamed Nazim	17 November 2013	20 January 2015	Moosa Ali Jaleel	
Minister of Defence and National Security		Moosa Ali Jaleel	20 January 2015	28 October 2015	Adam Shareef	
Minister of Home Affairs		Umar Naseer	19 November 2013	21 June 2016	Ahmed Zuhoor	
Minister of Home Affairs		Ahmed Zuhoor	22 June 2016	1 August 2016	Azleen Ahmed	
Minister of Foreign Affairs		Dunya Maumoon	17 November 2013	5 July 2016	Mohamed Asim	
Minister of Islamic Affairs		Mohamed Shaheem	17 November 2013	6 May 2015	Ahmed Ziyad	
Minister of Finance and Treasury		Abdulla Jihad	17 November 2013	22 June 2016	Ahmed Munawar	
Minister of Health		Mariyam Shakeela	1 July 2014	11 August 2014	Mohamed Shainee (acting), Ahmed Zuhoor	
Minister of Health		Ahmed Zuhoor	10 March 2015	20 May 2015	Iruthisham Adam	
Minister of Health		Iruthisham Adam	20 May 2015	22 June 2016	Abdulla Nazim Ibrahim	
Minister of Youth and Sports		Mohamed Maleeh Jamal	21 November 2013	20 May 2015	Ahmed Zuhoor	
Minister of Youth and Sports		Ahmed Zuhoor	20 May 2015	22 June 2016	Iruthisham Adam	
Minister of Transport and Communication		Ameen Ibrahim	17 November 2013	29 May 2014	Ministry abolished	
