= Maldives–Russia relations =

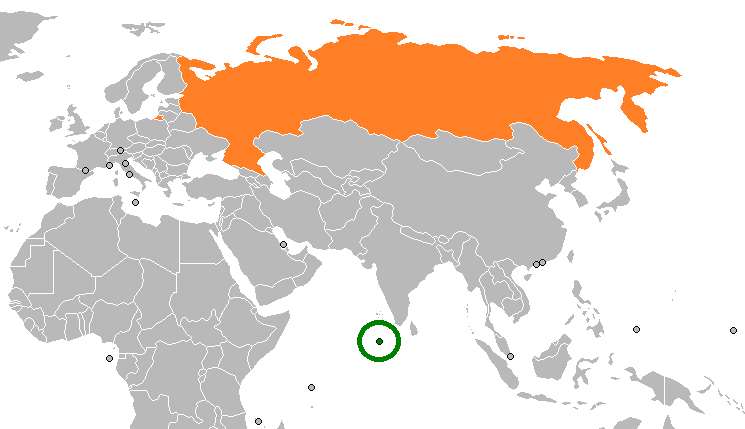
- Maldives: Russia

Maldives–Russia relations are the bilateral relations between the Republic of Maldives and the Russian Federation. Diplomatic relations between the two countries were established on 14 September 1966. The Maldives recognized the Russian Federation as the successor state of the Soviet Union on 31 December 1991.

== History ==
Both the countries' Ministry of Foreign Affairs kept regular dialogue and in March 1995 the Russian Foreign Affairs Deputy Minister, A. Chernyshev, had a meeting with the Maldivian Minister of Foreign Affairs, Fathulla Jameel. The Protocol of political consultations between both Foreign Affairs ministries were signed in March 2004.

On the sidelines of the 66th session of the United Nations General Assembly, Russian Foreign Deputy Minister, Mikhail Bogdanov, had a meeting with Maldivian Foreign Minister, Ahmed Naseem.

In February 2019, Maldives established an embassy in Russia and in July 2021, Russia signed an agreement to establish a Consulate General in Malé.

On 25 June 2019, Maldivian Foreign Minister Abdulla Shahid and Russian Foreign Minister Sergey Lavrov signed an agreement on Mutual Exception of Visa Requirements, where Maldivians can go into Russia without a visa for 90 days, and Russians can go to Maldives without a visa for 90 days but both will need a passport that hasn't been expired.

On 23 December 2024, Russia appointed Aleksei M. Idamkin as the first Consular General to the Maldives.

== See also ==
- List of ambassadors of Russia to Sri Lanka - ambassadors concurrently accredited to the Maldives
