= Ministry of Education, Higher Education and Skills Development =

Government ministry of the Maldives

- ތަޢުލީމާއި މަތީ ތަޢުލީމާއި ހުނަރުތައް ތަރައްޤީކުރުމާ ބެހޭ ވުޒާރާ Thauleemaai Mathee Thauleemaai Hunaruthah Tharaqqee Kurumaa Behey Vuzaaraa

Agency overview
- Formed: 22 December 1932
- Jurisdiction: Government of the Maldives
- Headquarters: Ministry of Education Velaanaage 8th Floor, Ameer Ahmed Magu, Malé, Maldives
- Annual budget: MVR 29.6 Million
- Minister responsible: Dr. Ismail Shafeeu
- Deputy Ministers responsible: Sulthan Ramiz; Shajah Firaaq; Aminath Maria; Aminath Nazima; Aminath Muna; Dr Fathimath Nishan
- Agency executives: Dr Ahmed Mohamed, Minister of State for Education; Dr. Abdul Latheef Mohamed, Minister of State for Education; Aishath Safoora, Minister of State for Education; Hussain Saeed Mohamed, Minister of State for Education; Dr Ahmed Adeel Naseer, Minister of State for Education
- Child agencies: Human Resource Management Section; Policy, Planning and Research Section; ESQID; Corporate Services Section; Audit Section; Minister's bureau; Finance Section; Foreign Relations Section; Thauleemee Fund; Expatriate Unit; Procurement Unit; Information Officer; Information Technology Services; School Administration Section
- Website: moe.gov.mv

The Ministry of Education, Higher Education and Skills Development is the Maldivian government sector responsible for education and providing public schools with funding necessary for the education institutions. Incumbent Minister is Dr. Ismail Shafeeu

The Ministry of Education directs the formulation and implementation of education policies. It has control of the development and administration of the Government and Government-aided primary schools, secondary schools, junior colleges, and a centralized institute. It also registers private schools.

It was introduced in 1965 shortly after the Independence of Maldives from the British. The Maldivian education system was revolutionized after the introduction of the MOE.

A survey of Maldives Schools in 1992 showed that the total number of pupils in Maldives was 73,642 and the number of government and private schools were 32,475 and 41,167 respectively.

== History ==
It was established in 1932 as the Vazeerul Ma'aarifge Mahukamaa. In 1934 it was changed to the Mahukamatahul Ma'aarif, in 1954 to the Vuzaarathul Ma'aarif, in 1971 to the Ministry of Education, and in 1975 to the Department of Education. In 1977 it was finally changed to the Ministry of Education.

=== Ministers ===
No.	Portrait	Name (born-died)	Term			Political party	Government	Ref.
No.	Portrait	Name (born-died)	Took office	Left office	Time in office	Political party	Government	Ref.
1	Ahmed Kamil Didi	Ahmed Kamil Didi	22 December 1932	22 September 1953	20 years, 274 days	?	Shamsuddeen III	
2	Mohamed Amin Didi	Mohamed Amin Didi (1910–1954)	25 December 1933	26 November 1936	3 years, 1 day	?	Shamsuddeen III; Nooraddeen II	
3	Hussain Afeefuddin	Hussain Afeefuddin	26 November 1936	26 December 1939	3 years, 30 days	?	Abdul Majeed Didi	
4	Mohamed Amin Didi	Mohamed Amin Didi (1910–1954)	29 October 1944	22 December 1952	8 years, 54 days	?	Abdul Majeed Didi	
5	Abdulla Jalaluddin	Abdulla Jalaluddin	22 December 1952	21 August 1953	242 days	?	Mohamed Amin Didi	
6	Ibrahim Fareed Didi	Ibrahim Fareed Didi	21 March 1954	03 June 1956	2 years, 74 days	?	Fareed I	
7	Ibrahim Shihab	Ibrahim Shihab (1922–1988)	03 June 1956	03 August 1959	3 years, 61 days	?	Fareed I	
8	Ibrahim Nasir	Ibrahim Nasir (1926–2008)	03 August 1959	11 November 1968	9 years, 100 days	?	Fareed I	
9	Hassan Zareer	Hassan Zareer (1935–2001)	11 November 1968	01 August 1972	3 years, 264 days	?	Ibrahim Nasir	
10	Adnan Hussain	Adnan Hussain	16 August 1972	08 March 1975	2 years, 204 days	?	Ibrahim Nasir	
11	Mohamed Nooruddin	Mohamed Nooruddin	19 May 1975	06 January 1977	1 year, 232 days	?	Ibrahim Nasir	
12	Abdul Sattar Moosa Didi	Abdul Sattar Moosa Didi (1936–2015)	06 January 1977	11 November 1978	1 year, 309 days	?	Ibrahim Nasir	
13	Mohamed Zahir Hussain	Mohamed Zahir Hussain	23 July 1979	30 May 1990	10 years, 311 days	?	Maumoon	
14	Abdulla Hameed	Abdulla Hameed (1939–2015)	30 May 1990	11 November 1993	3 years, 165 days	?	Maumoon	
15	Mohamed Latheef	Mohamed Latheef	11 November 1993	09 October 2002	8 years, 332 days	?	Maumoon	
16	Ismail Shafeeu	Ismail Shafeeu (born 1956)	09 October 2002	11 November 2003	−8 years, 332 days	?	Maumoon	
17	Mahamood Shougee	Mahamood Shougee	11 November 2003	14 July 2005	1 year, 245 days	?	Maumoon	
18	Zahiya Zareer	Zahiya Zareer (born 1959)	14 July 2005	10 November 2008	3 years, 119 days	?	Maumoon	
19	Mustafa Lutfi	Mustafa Lutfi	12 November 2008	29 June 2010	1 year, 229 days	MDP	Nasheed	
20	Mustafa Lutfi	Mustafa Lutfi	07 July 2010	11 December 2010	157 days	MDP	Nasheed	
21	Shifa Mohamed	Shifa Mohamed	12 December 2010	08 February 2012	1 year, 58 days	MDP	Nasheed	
22	Asim Ahmed	Asim Ahmed (born 1963)	12 February 2012	17 November 2013	340 days	?	Waheed	
23	Aishath Shiham	Aishath Shiham (born 1964)	17 November 2013	16 November 2018	4 years, 364 days	?	Yameen	
24	Aishath Ali	Aishath Ali	17 November 2018	17 November 2023	5 years, 0 days	?	Solih	
25	Ismail Shafeeu	Ismail Shafeeu (born 1980)	17 November 2023	Incumbent	2 years, 271 days	?	Muizzu	
