= Cabinet of Mohamed Waheed Hassan =

Government of the Maldives from 2012 to 2013

Waheed Cabinet
- Cabinet of the Maldives

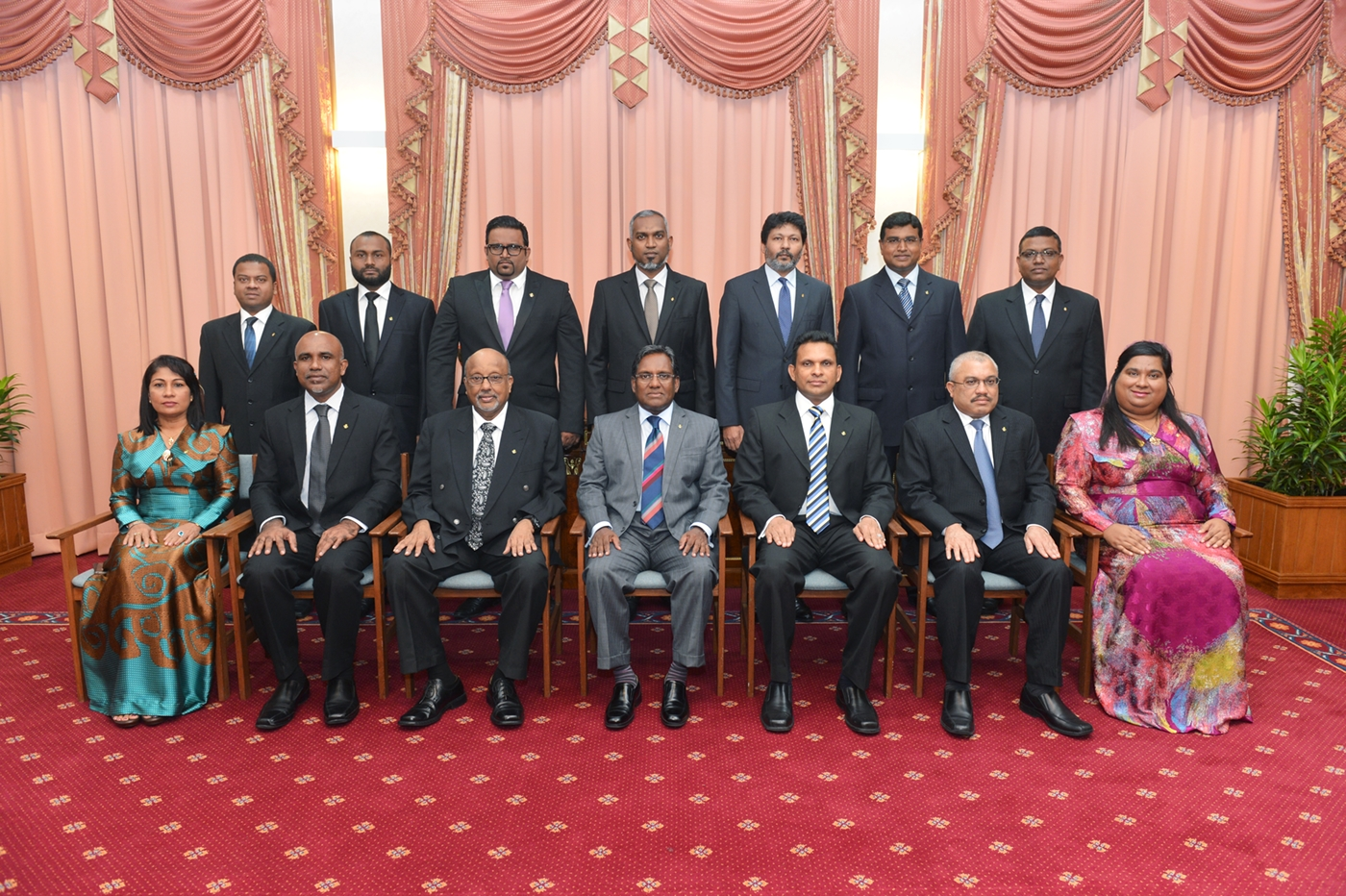
- Cabinet of President Waheed in November 2013
- Date formed: 7 February 2012
- Date dissolved: 17 November 2013

People and organisations
- President: Mohamed Waheed Hassan Manik
- President's history: Vice President of the Maldives (2008–2012)
- Vice President: Mohamed Waheed Deen
- No. of ministers: 18 (including AG)
- Ministers removed: 5 resigned 1 dismissed
- Member parties: Gaumee Itthihaad; Progressive Party of Maldives; Dhivehi Rayyithunge Party
- Opposition parties: Maldivian Democratic Party; Jumhooree Party
- Opposition leaders: Mohamed Nasheed; Qasim Ibrahim

History
- Advice and consent: People's Majlis
- Successor: Yameen Cabinet

The Cabinet of Mohamed Waheed Hassan Manik was the most senior level of the executive branch of the Government of the Maldives from 2012 to 2013.

Mohamed Waheed Hassan Manik was appointed President of the Maldives after the resignation of Mohamed Nasheed during the 2011–2013 Maldives political crisis.

== Overview ==
President Waheed's cabinet comprised up to 15 cabinet ministers, including the attorney general. The positions were handed out to different members representing different parties of Waheed's coalition.

During his presidency, Waheed had changed the names of two ministries, the Ministry of Housing and Environment to the Ministry of Housing and Infrastructure, and the Ministry of Health and Family to the Ministry of Health.

=== Composition ===
Position	Portrait	Name	Term in office		Ref
Position	Portrait	Name	Took office	Left office	Ref
President, Commander-in-Chief of the Armed Forces		Mohamed Waheed Hassan Manik	7 February 2012	17 November 2013	
Vice President		Mohamed Waheed Deen	25 April 2012	10 November 2013	
Attorney General		Aishath Azima Shakoor	1 July 2013	17 November 2013	
Minister of Defence and National Security		Mohamed Nazim	8 February 2012	17 November 2013	
Minister of Home Affairs		Ahmed Shafeeu (acting)	11 May 2013	17 November 2013	
Minister of Finance and Treasury		Abdulla Jihad	5 March 2012	17 November 2013	
Minister of Education		Asim Ahmed	12 February 2012	17 November 2013	
Minister of Health		Aamal Ali (acting)	4 November 2013	17 November 2013	
Minister of Fisheries and Agriculture		Ahmed Shafeeu	12 March 2012	17 November 2013	
Minister of Transport and Communication		Ameen Ibrahim	10 April 2013	17 November 2013	
Minister of Tourism, Arts and Culture		Ahmed Adeeb Abdul Ghafoor	12 February 2012	17 November 2013	
Minister of Economic Development		Ahmed Mohamed	12 February 2012	17 November 2013	
Minister of Housing and Infrastructure		Mohamed Muizzu	21 May 2012	17 November 2013	
Minister of Human Resources, Youth and Sports		Mohamed Hussain Shareef	12 February 2012	17 November 2013	
Minister of Islamic Affairs		Mohamed Shaheem Ali Saeed	19 February 2012	17 November 2013	
Minister of Gender, Family and Human Rights		Aamaal Ali	9 July 2013	17 November 2013	
Minister of Environment and Energy		Mariyam Shakeela	21 May 2012	17 November 2013	
Minister of Foreign Affairs		Mariyam Shakeela (acting)	12 September 2013	17 November 2013	

== Former Ministers ==
Office	Portrait	Name	Term in office		Replacement	Ref
Office	Portrait	Name	Took office	Left office	Replacement	Ref
Minister of Home Affairs		Mohamed Jameel Ahmed	8 February 2012	11 May 2013	Ahmed Shafeeu (acting)	
Minister of Transport and Communication		Ahmed Shamheed	12 February 2012	8 November 2012	Mohamed Nazim (acting), Ameen Ibrahim	
Attorney General		Aishath Azima Shakoor	12 February 2012	10 April 2013	Aishath Bisam	
Attorney General		Aishath Bisam	10 April 2013	1 July 2013	Aishath Azima Shakoor	
Minister of Foreign Affairs		Abdul Samad Abdulla	5 March 2012	25 August 2013	Asim Ahmed (acting), Mariyam Shakeela (acting)	
Minister of Health		Ahmed Jamsheed Mohamed	7 May 2012	4 November 2013	Aamaal Ali (acting)	
Minister of Gender, Family and Human Rights		Fathimath Dhiyana Saeed	7 May 2012	19 November 2012	Mariyam Shakeela (acting), Aishath Azima Shakoor (acting; 7 March 2013 - 10 April 2013), Aishath Azima Shakoor	
Minister of Gender, Family and Human Rights		Aishath Azima Shakoor	10 April 2013	1 July 2013	Aishath Azima Shakoor (acting), Aamaal Ali	
Minister of Housing and Environment		Mohamed Muizzu	19 February 2012	21 May 2012	Himself as Minister of Housing and Infrastructure	
Minister of Health and Family		Ahmed Jamsheed Mohamed	12 February 2012	7 May 2012	Himself as Minister of Health	
