= Ahmed Zaki (politician) =

Prime Minister of the Maldives from 1972 to 1975

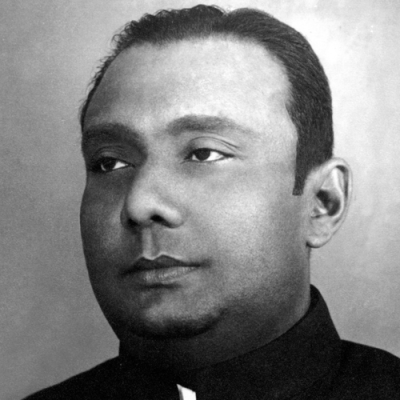

Prime Minister of the Maldives
- In office 1 August 1972 – 6 March 1975
- President: Ibrahim Nasir
- Preceded by: Ibrahim Nasir
- Succeeded by: Office abolished

Speaker of the People's Majlis
- In office 22 February 1990 – 11 November 1993
- President: Maumoon Abdul Gayoom
- Preceded by: Ibrahim Fareed
- Succeeded by: Ahmed Shathir
- In office 3 October 1959 – 1 August 1972
- Monarch: Mohamed Fareed I
- Preceded by: Abdulla Hameed
- Succeeded by: Ahmed Zahir

Personal details
- Born: 16 April 1931 Malé, Maldive Islands
- Died: 15 November 1996 (aged 65) Mount Elizabeth Hospital, Singapore
- Spouse(s): Fathimath Ibrahim Didi, Aneesa Nooraddeen
- Children: Ismail Shafeeu; Mohamed Amir
- Parents: Ibrahim Zaki; Zulaikha Mohamed
- Other offices: 1968–1975: Minister of External Affairs; 1983–1983: Minister of State; 1983–1990: Attorney General; 1995–1996: Ambassador of the Maldives to the United Kingdom

Ahmed Zaki (16 April 1931 – 15 November 1996) was a Maldivian politician.

He served as the Speaker of People's Majlis from 1959 to 1972. In 1972, he was appointed as Prime Minister of the Republic of Maldives.

During the administration of Maumoon Abdul Gayoom, Zaki held different cabinet positions, such as Attorney General from November 1983 to February 1990. He was elected again to the position of the Speaker of People's Majlis from 1990 to 1993.
