= Mariyam Shakeela =

Mariyam Shakeela may refer to:

- Mariyam Shakeela (politician), former government Minister for Health and Family and the Minister of Environment and Energy from Maldives
- Mariyam Shakeela (actress), Maldivian film actress
