= Ibrahim Rasheed =

Maldivian politician (1928–2021)

Ibrahim Rasheed NIIV
- އިބްރާހީމް ރަޝީދު
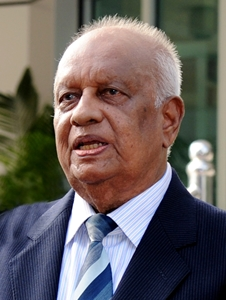
- Rasheed in 2011

Minister of Home Affairs
- In office 8 January 1977 – 11 November 1978
- President: Ibrahim Nasir
- Preceded by: Ibrahim Nasir
- Succeeded by: Umar Zahir
- In office 18 August 1960 – 11 November 1968
- Prime Minister: Ibrahim Nasir
- Preceded by: Ibrahim Nasir
- Succeeded by: Ibrahim Nasir

Minister of Health
- In office 11 November 1968 – 8 January 1977
- President: Ibrahim Nasir
- Preceded by: Ahmed Hilmy Didi

Personal details
- Born: 1928 Malé, Sultanate of the Maldive Islands
- Died: 31 January 2021 (aged 92) Henveiru, Malé, Maldives

"Karankaa" Ibrahim Rasheed, NIIV (1928 – 31 January 2021) was a Maldivian politician who served as deputy prime minister of the Maldives under prime minister Ibrahim Nasir and as Home minister from 1960 to 1968 and again from 1977 to 1978.

== Early life ==
Ibrahim Rasheed was born in 1928 in Malé, Maldives. He studied in Ceylon.

== Political career ==
Ibrahim Rasheed began his service to the government of the Maldives on 24 November 1942, as secretary at the Rayyithunge Bodu Store (later State Trading Organization). Rasheed served several positions during the government of prime minister Mohamed Amin Didi, and served as Secretary to the President, under the Amin administration in the short-lived first republic of 1953.

Rasheed was later appointed Deputy Prime Minister under Ibrahim Nasir. He was appointed Minister of Home Affairs on 18 August 1960, to succeed Nasir. Following the establishment of the second republic of the Maldives, prime minister Nasir was elected president, and Rasheed was appointed in the new cabinet as Minister of Health. He remained in the position until 1977, when he was appointed Minister of Home Affairs for a second time.

As Minister of Home Affairs, Rasheed worked alongside Prime minister Ibrahim Nasir in the securing of the full Independence of the Maldives on 26 July 1965.

== Death ==
Rasheed died on 31 January 2021, after long-term illness at the age of 92. President Ibrahim Mohamed Solih declared 3 days of national mourning and ordered the national flag to be flown at half-mast.

== Awards ==
Rasheed was awarded the Order of Izzuddin and the National Service Award, by president Mohamed Nasheed in July 2011 for his national service.
