= Abdulla Shahid =

President of the 76th UN General Assembly

Abdulla Shahid NIIV
- ޢަބްދުﷲ ޝާހިދު
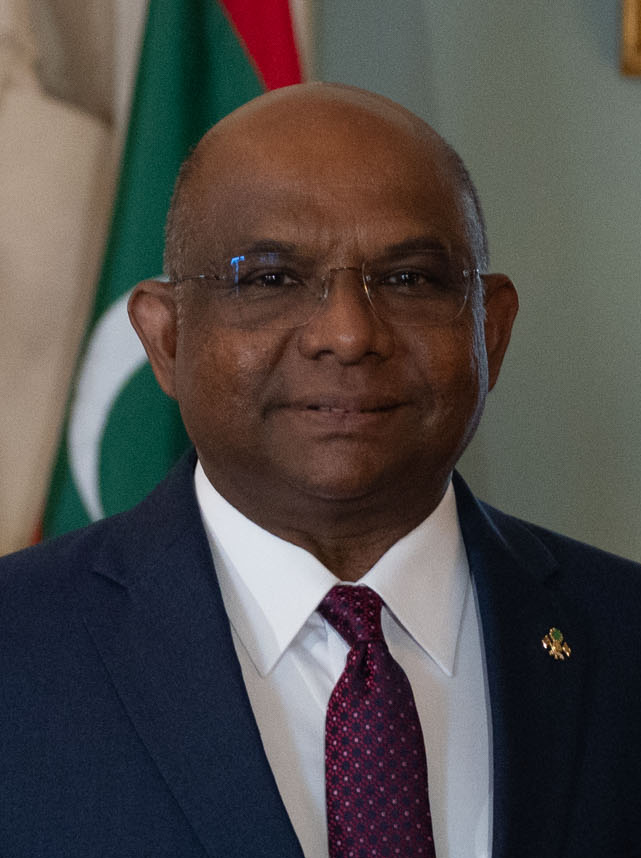
- Shahid in 2023

President of the 76th UN General Assembly
- In office 14 September 2021 – 13 September 2022
- Preceded by: Volkan Bozkır
- Succeeded by: Csaba Kőrösi

Minister of Foreign Affairs
- In office 17 November 2018 – 17 November 2023
- President: Ibrahim Mohamed Solih
- Preceded by: Mohamed Asim
- Succeeded by: Moosa Zameer
- In office 23 August 2007 – 11 November 2008
- President: Maumoon Abdul Gayoom
- Preceded by: Ahmed Shaheed
- Succeeded by: Ahmed Shaheed

16th Speaker of the People's Majlis
- In office 28 May 2009 – 28 May 2014
- President: Mohamed Nasheed; Mohamed Waheed Hassan; Abdulla Yameen
- Preceded by: Mohamed Shihab
- Succeeded by: Abdulla Maseeh Mohamed

Member of the People's Majlis
- In office 28 May 2014 – 14 November 2018
- Preceded by: Constituency established
- Constituency: Henveiru Uthuru
- In office 28 May 2009 – 28 May 2014
- Succeeded by: Moosa Nizar Ibrahim
- Constituency: Keyodhoo

President of the Maldivian Democratic Party
- In office 20 February 2024 – 14 August 2026
- Preceded by: Ibrahim Mohamed Solih

Personal details
- Born: 26 May 1962 (age 64) Malé, Maldive Islands
- Party: Maldivian Democratic Party (2013–present)
- Other political affiliations: Dhivehi Rayyithunge Party (before 2013)
- Children: 3
- Parent(s): Maimoona Wajeeh; Moosa Jameel
- Education: Canberra College of Advanced Education; Fletcher School of Law and Diplomacy

Abdulla Shahid, NIIV (Dhivehi: ޢަބްދުﷲ ޝާހިދު; born 26 May 1962) is a Maldivian diplomat, politician, and public servant who served as the President of the 76th session of the United Nations General Assembly from 2021 to 2022. He also served as the Minister of Foreign Affairs of the Maldives from 2018 to 2023. A member of the Maldivian Democratic Party, he served as the President of the party from 2024 until his resignation in 2026.

Shahid has held a range of senior positions in government and parliament over a four-decade career, including Speaker of the People's Majlis (2009–2014) and multiple terms as a Member of the People's Majlis. He is known for his contributions to multilateral diplomacy, democratic governance, and constitutional reform in the Maldives.

== Early life and education ==
Abdulla Shahid was born on 26 May 1962 in Malé, Maldives. Shahid joined the Ministry of Foreign Affairs in 1984. He earned his bachelor's degree in political science from the Canberra College of Advanced Education in 1987. In 1991, he obtained a master's degree in international relations from the Fletcher School of Law and Diplomacy, Tufts University. From 1990 to 1994, Shahid served on the advisory board to President Maumoon Abdul Gayoom.

== Career ==
=== Early diplomatic service ===
Shahid began his career in the Maldives' foreign service, rising through the ranks of the Ministry of Foreign Affairs where he was appointed director in 1993. He led the International Organizations and Conferences Department and represented the Maldives in a number of international fora, including the United Nations, the Commonwealth of Nations, the Non-Aligned Movement and the Organization of Islamic Conference.

=== Member of Parliament and Speaker of the People's Majlis ===
In 2000, Shahid was elected to the People's Majlis as the representative for the Vaavu Atoll constituency. He went on to serve two terms as its MP. Between 2004 and 2008, he was a delegate to the Special Majlis that drafted the new Constitution of the Maldives.

In May 2009, Shahid was elected to represent the Keyodhoo constituency in the first multi-party parliamentary elections held in the Maldives.

That same month, he was elected as the 16th Speaker of the People's Majlis, a role he held from 2009 to 2014. He secured 42 out of 75 votes in parliament and presided over a transformative period in the country's democratic transition.

On 15 April 2013, Shahid resigned from the Dhivehi Rayyithunge Party, citing growing concerns about democratic backsliding. On 18 April 2013, he announced on Twitter that he had joined the Maldivian Democratic Party, aligning himself with the party’s democratic reform agenda.

During the 2014 parliamentary election, he ran for the Henveiru Uthuru (North Henveiru) constituency, where he was elected with 1047 votes. He served as the member of the People's Majlis for Henveiru Uthuru until his resignation in November 2018 to become the Minister of Foreign Affairs.

=== Minister of Foreign Affairs ===
Shahid has served two terms as Minister of Foreign Affairs. His first appointment came in 2007 under President Maumoon Abdul Gayoom, where he served until 2008. He had previously held the post of Minister of State for Foreign Affairs from 2005.

In 2018, he returned to the Foreign Ministry under President Ibrahim Mohamed Solih and served until 2023. During this period, Shahid led Maldives' diplomatic re-engagement with multilateral institutions, climate diplomacy, and renewed Commonwealth membership.

=== President of the United Nations General Assembly ===
On 7 June 2021, Shahid was elected as the 76th President of the United Nations General Assembly with 143 votes in favour out of 193 member states. His presidency focused on post-pandemic recovery, climate action, and revitalising multilateral cooperation.

On 23 December 2021, Shahid tested positive for COVID-19.

=== President of the Maldivian Democratic Party ===
In February 2024, following the resignation of former party president Mohamed Nasheed, Shahid assumed the leadership of the Maldivian Democratic Party (MDP), the country’s largest political party. Unopposed in the nomination process, his selection reflected broad consensus within the party at a critical time. As president, Shahid has focused on revitalising democratic values, strengthening internal unity, and preparing the party to meet new political and institutional challenges.

In August 2026, Shahid resigned to take part in the MDP primary for the 2028 presidential election.

== Arrest ==
On 2 November 2026, Shahid was arrested under a court warrant which accused him of sexually abusing a minor. Minutes before his arrest, Shahid denied the accusation and urged people to refrain spreading defamatory claims against him. He was remanded for thirty days while the investigation is ongoing.

== Honours ==
- Maldives:
  - Order of the Distinguished Rule of Izzuddin – 2021
- Dominican Republic:
  - Grand Cross with Silver Breast Star of the Order of Merit of Duarte, Sánchez and Mella – 2022
- Guatemala:
  - Grand Cross of the Order of Antonio José de Irisarri – 2022
- Gabon:
  - National Order of Merit – 2022

Diplomatic posts
| Preceded by Volkan Bozkır | President of the United Nations General Assembly; 2021–2022 | Succeeded by Csaba Kőrösi |
U.S. order of precedence (ceremonial)
| Preceded by Antony Blinken as Secretary of State | Order of precedence of the United States as President of the United Nations General Assembly when in session | Succeeded by António Guterres as Secretary-General of the United Nations |
| Preceded by António Guterres as Secretary-General of the United Nations | Order of precedence of the United States as President of the United Nations General Assembly when not in session | Succeeded by Hersey Kyota as Ambassador to the United States for Palau |
