= Ali Ihusaan =

Maldivian government official

- ޢަލީ އިޙްސާން
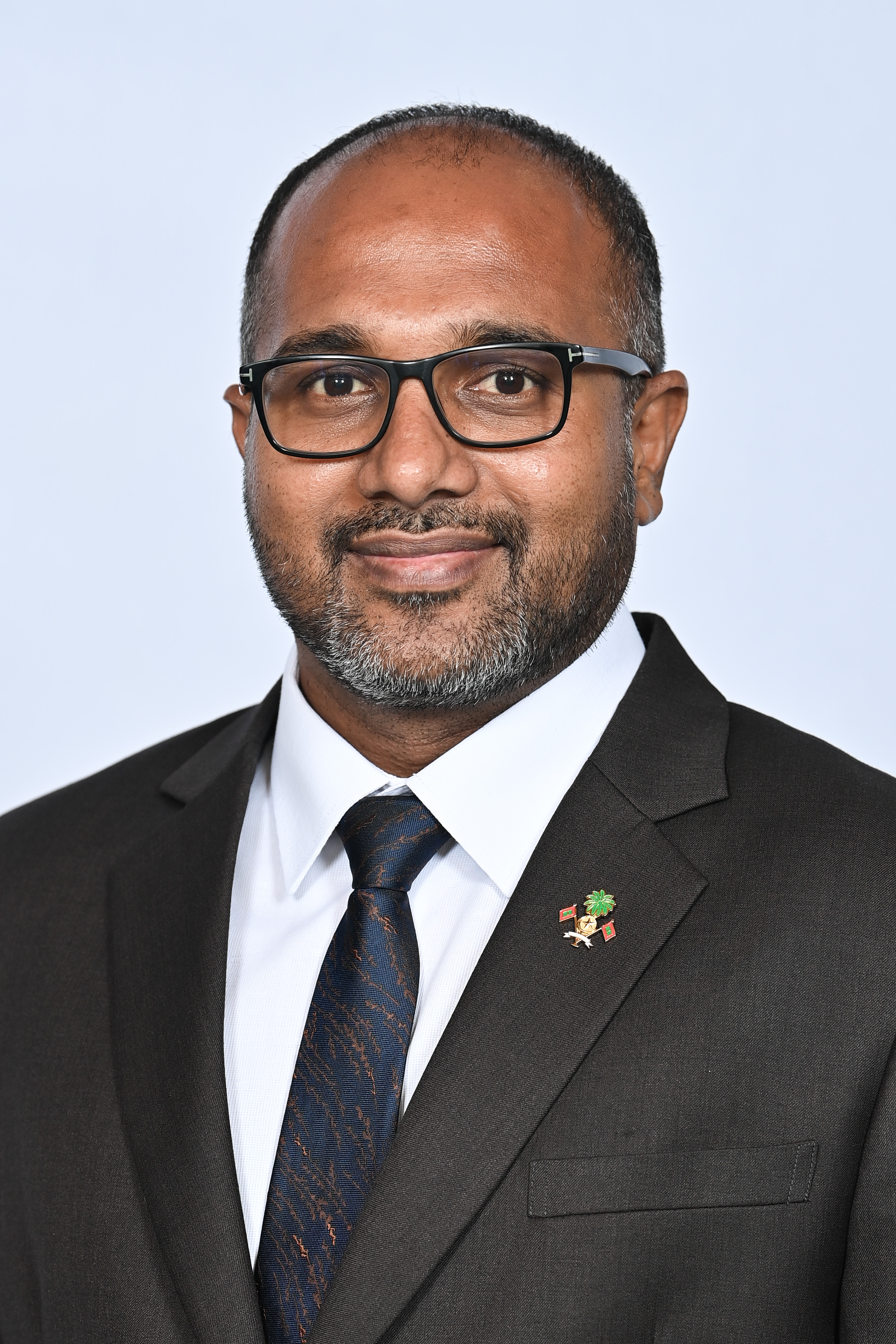
- Official portrait, 2023

Minister of Homeland Security, Labour and Technology
- Incumbent
- Assumed office 14 April 2026
- President: Mohamed Muizzu
- Preceded by: Himself

Minister of Homeland Security and Technology
- In office 17 November 2023 – 14 April 2026
- President: Mohamed Muizzu
- Preceded by: Imran Abdulla
- Succeeded by: Himself

Personal details
- Born: Feydhoo, Addu City, Seenu Atoll, Maldives
- Party: People's National Congress (2022–present)
- Parent: Ibrahim Didi (father)
- Military career
- Allegiance: Maldives
- Branch: Maldives National Defence Force
- Rank: Captain

Ali Ihusaan (Dhivehi: ޢަލީ އިޙްސާން) is a Maldivian politician who has served as the Minister of Homeland Security, Labour and Technology since 14 April 2026. He also served as a member of Maldives Monetary Authority.

== Early life and education ==
Ihusaan was born in Feydhoo, Addu City, Seenu Atoll, Maldives. He was born to Feydhoo Dhekunu MP, Ibrahim Didi. Ihusaan obtained a bachelor's degree in the United States Military Academy. He is the first non-US citizen to be appointed as brigade executive officer in the United States Corps of Cadets. He completed a master's degree in business administration from Nanyang Technological University in Singapore and did further air-borne training with the US military. Ali Ihusaan is a graduate of the United States Marine Corps' The Basic School (TBS) in 2012.

== Career ==
Ali Ihusaan joined the Maldives National Defence Force (MNDF) on 11 December 2005 as a recruit and was commissioned as a lieutenant on 3 June 2010 upon graduation from United States Military Academy (USMA) at West Point, New York. He was promoted to first lieutenant on 10 January 2012 and to captain on 1 January 2014. During his time at the Maldives National Defence Force, Ihusaan held several leadership roles. He was head of military instructions at Officer Training Wing of the Defence Institute for Training and Education (DITE) and later served as executive officer of DITE which was the training department of MNDF. In 2011 he was assigned as the military aide to the minister of defence. Following his graduation from the United States Marine Corps' The Basic School in 2013, he was assigned as the commander of Marine Deployment Unit 1 of MNDF. Following his return in 2015 after completion of a master's degree, Ihusaan was assigned to establish sea ambulance service across the Maldives. After successful implementation of the project, he was assigned as the deputy commander of Ordnance Service of MNDF, in addition to being the deputy spokesperson of MNDF. Ihusaan served in the Maldives National Defence Force until he voluntarily retired 2 January 2017, as a captain.

On 2 January 2017, Ali Ihusaan assumed the role of chief executive officer of Happy Market Trading Company Pvt Ltd. Later that year he also took the role as CEO of International Beverages Company Pvt Ltd. In 2018 he assumed additional responsibility as the managing director of AIMS Healthcare Pvt Ltd.

In January 2018, then president of Maldives, appointed Ali Ihusaan as a director of the governing board of Maldives Central Bank (Maldives Monetary Authority). Following two years on the board, he was elected by the board of directors to serve as the chairman of the Audit Committee of Maldives Monetary Authority. He served as chairman of the Audit Committee from February 2020 until his resignation from the board in August 2021.

In 2022 he entered politics and joined the People's National Congress. On 17 November 2023, he was appointed as the minister of Homeland Security and Technology by president Mohamed Muizzu. On 14 April 2026, he was appointed as the minister of Homeland Security, Labour and Technology.

== Achievements and decorations ==
Ihusaan's military decorations include Achievement Ribbon, Special Service Ribbon, Skills Ribbon, Good Conduct Ribbon, 17th SAARC Summit Medal, the United States National Defence Service Medal, German Armed Forces Proficiency Badge (gold), United States Army Airborne Wings, United States Marine Corps Rifle Expert badge, the United States Marine Corps Pistol Sharpshooter badge and the Maldives National Defence Force's Sharp Shooter badge.

His awards include James Dillion Clinton Memorial Award from US Military Academy, Henry O. Flipper Memorial Award for exceptional leadership from US Military Academy and Junior Chamber International's Maldives Ten Outstanding Young Persons award 2011 for Academic Leadership. Ali Ihusaan was given the title of Role Model by the Auditor General's Office of the Maldives. He was also awarded the President's Commendation for outstanding services in 2014.
