= Ismail Shafeeu =

Maldivian government official (born 1980)

- އިސްމާޢިލް ޝަފީއު
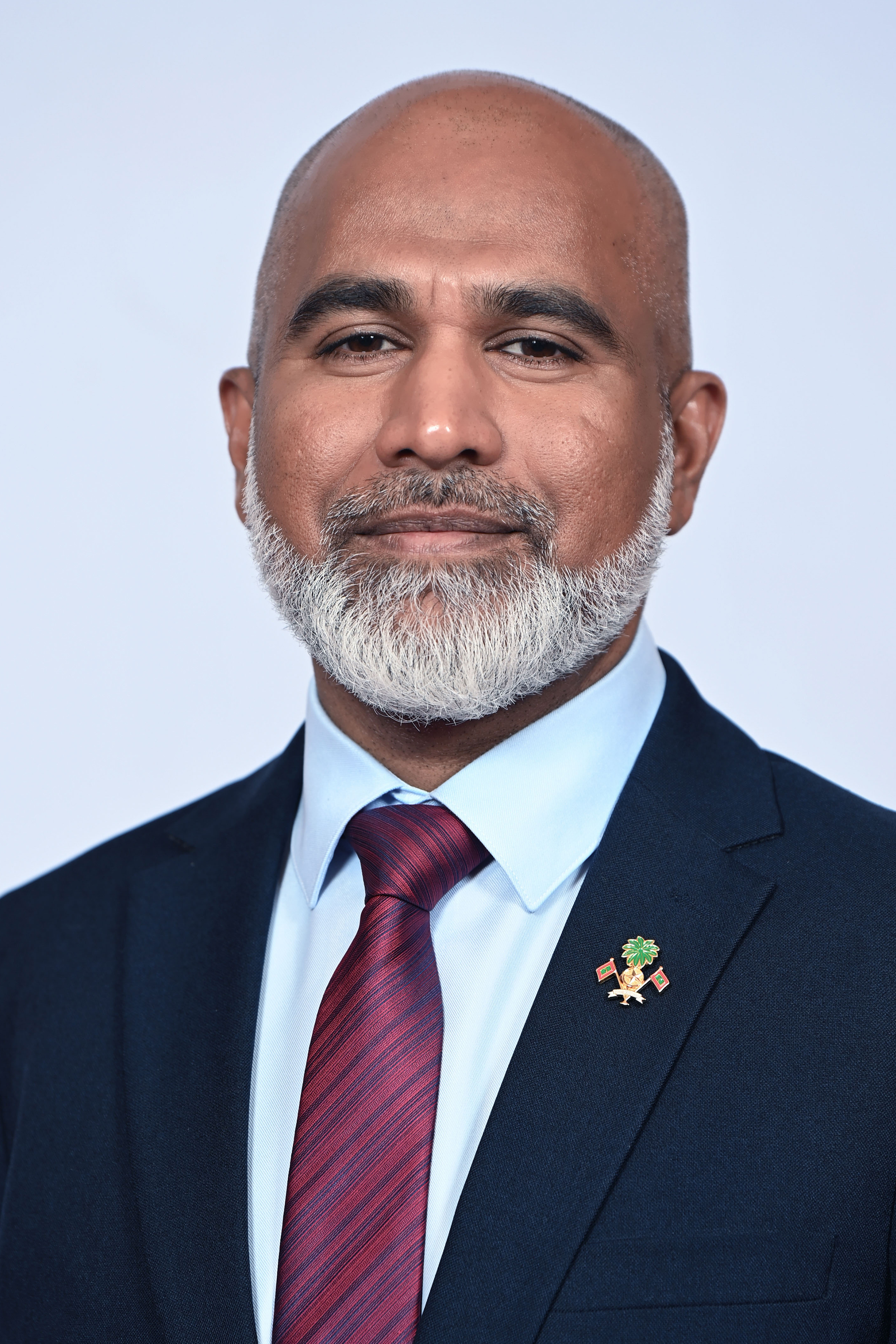
- Official portrait, 2026

Minister of Education, Higher Education and Skills Development
- Incumbent
- Assumed office 14 April 2026
- President: Mohamed Muizzu
- Preceded by: Himself

Minister of Education
- In office 17 November 2023 – 14 April 2026
- President: Mohamed Muizzu
- Preceded by: Aishath Ali
- Succeeded by: Himself

Deputy Minister of Education
- In office 12 March 2012 – 17 November 2013
- President: Mohamed Waheed Hassan

Personal details
- Born: 1980 (age 45–46) Gadhdhoo, Maldives
- Children: 1
- Parent: Muhammed Hussain
- Education: University of Durham (PhD); University of Malaya (M.A.); Maldives National University (B.T)

Ismail Shafeeu, (Dhivehi: އިސްމާޢިލް ޝަފީއު; born 1980) is a Maldivian former teacher, who is the Minister of Education since 17 November 2023. He previously served as a Deputy Minister of Education from 2012 to 2013.

== Career ==
Shafeeu served as the Dean of the Center for Research and Publication at the Islamic University of the Maldives. In this role, he was responsible for overseeing educational research efforts and promoting awareness of various research initiatives. He also played a key role in facilitating the development of research professionals at the institution.

Prior, Shafeeu held the position of Deputy Minister of Education, where he contributed significantly to education policy formulation.

Shafeeu has been the recipient of several prestigious awards. In 2015, he received the Commonwealth Scholarship Award from the Commonwealth Scholarship Commission in England. Earlier, in 2011, he was awarded the Award of Scholastic Achievement from the University of Malaya.

From October 2011 to March 2012, Shafeeu served as the principal at Meyna School in Holhudhoo.

In 2023, Shafeeu was appointed by President Mohamed Muizzu as the Minister of Education.

In 2026, Shafeeu was reappointed as the Minister of Education, Higher Education and Skills Development.

== Education ==
Shafeeu completed his PhD from the University of Durham in 2019. Prior to this, he earned his Master's degree from the University of Malaya in 2011. He also holds a Bachelor of Teaching (Secondary) degree, which he obtained from the Maldives College of Higher Education in 2007.
