= Ismail Shafeeu (politician) =

Maldivian politician (born 1956)

Ismail Shafeeu NIIV
- އިސްމާޢީލް ޝަފީޢު
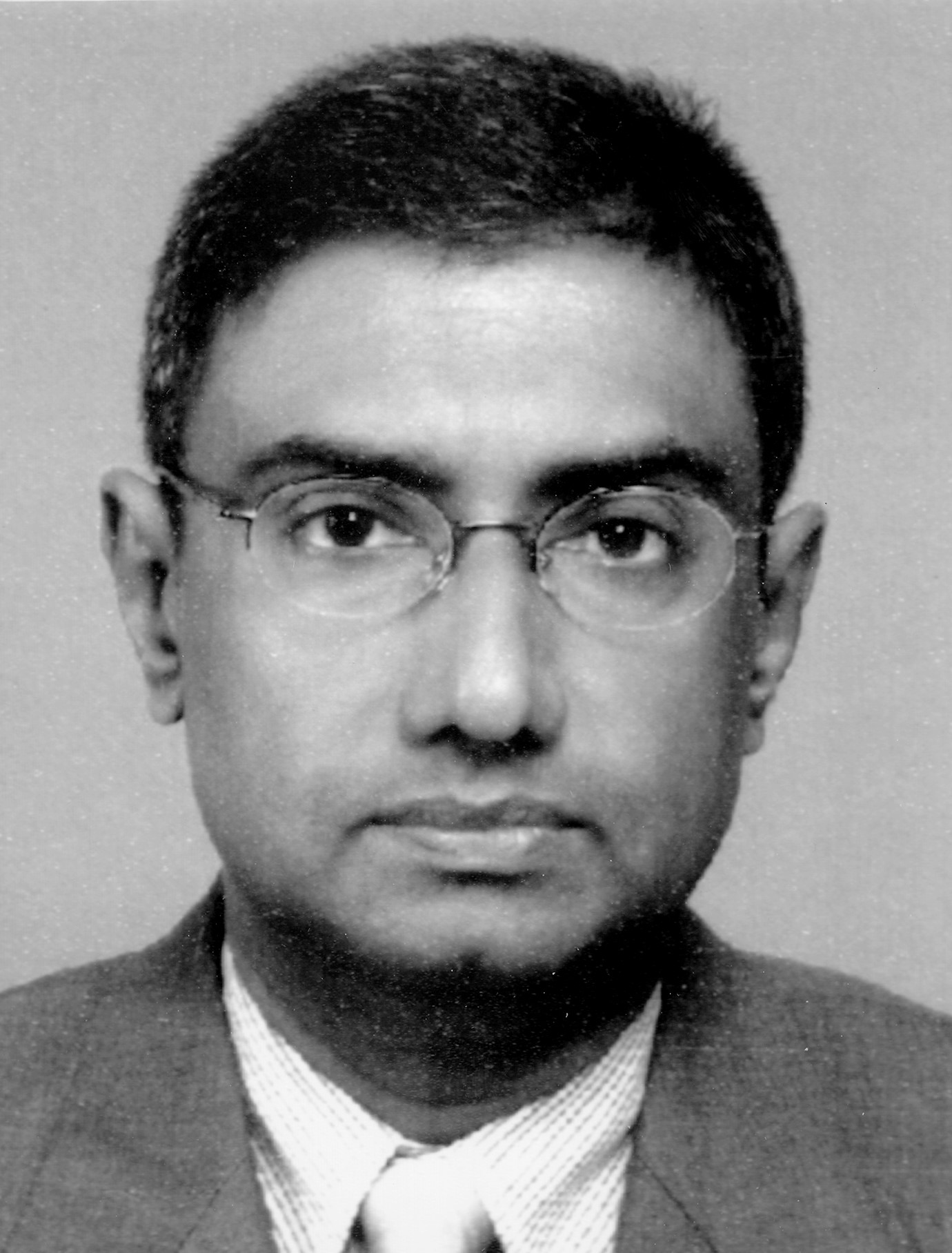
- Shafeeu as the Minister of Education

Minister of Defence and National Service
- In office 1 September 2004 – 12 November 2008
- President: Maumoon Abdul Gayoom
- Succeeded by: Ameen Faisal

Minister of Home Affairs and Environment
- In office 11 November 2003 – 1 September 2004
- President: Maumoon Abdul Gayoom
- Preceded by: Abdul Rasheed Hussain
- Succeeded by: Ahmed Abdulla; Umar Zahir (Note: Succeeded by Ahmed Abdulla as the Minister of Environment and Umar Zahir as the Minister of Home Affairs)

Minister of Education
- In office 9 October 2002 – 11 November 2003
- President: Maumoon Abdul Gayoom
- Preceded by: Mohamed Latheef
- Succeeded by: Mahamood Shougee

Minister of Home Affairs, Housing and Environment
- In office 11 November 1998 – 9 October 2002
- President: Maumoon Abdul Gayoom
- Preceded by: Abdulla Jameel

Minister of Tourism
- In office 30 May 1990 – 26 May 1991
- President: Maumoon Abdul Gayoom
- Preceded by: Ahmed Mujthaba
- Succeeded by: Abdulla Jameel

Personal details
- Born: 1956 (age 69–70)
- Relations: Abdulla Yameen; Maumoon Abdul Gayoom (brothers)
- Children: 2
- Education: Macquarie University

Ismail Shafeeu NIIV (Dhivehi: އިސްމާޢީލް ޝަފީޢު; born 1956) is a Maldivian politician and statesman who served as the Minister of Defence and National Security of the Maldives from 2004 to 2008. He had served as other ministerial level positions within his brother, Maumoon Abdul Gayoom's administration.

== Early life and education ==
Shafeeu attended the Macquarie University as part of the Colombo Plan Scholarship he won and attained a degree in economics. He is the brother of Abdulla Yameen and Maumoon Abdul Gayoom.

== Career ==
Shafeeu worked as a teacher before starting to work in various government agencies. In 1990, President Maumoon Abdul Gayoom appointed Shafeeu as the Minister of Tourism until 1991. In 1998, he served as the Minister of Home Affairs Housing and Environment until 2002 and was appointed the Minister of Home Affairs and Environment from 2003 until 2004, where he served as the Minister of Defence and National Security until 2008. He also served as the Minister of Education from 2002 to 2003 as well as the Environment Minister.

He served on the boards of the Maldives Monetary Authority (1990–2005), Dhiraagu, Maldives Transport and Contracting Company (MTCC), and the State Electric Company (STELCO), and also as the chairman of Dhiraagu.

Shafeeu was the chief coordinator for the relief effort following the 2004 Indian Ocean tsnuami and was the Maldives Governor to the Asian Development Bank.

In 2008, President Gayoom awarded Shafeeu the Order of the Distinguished Rule of Izzuddin.

In 2012, Shafeeu was appointed by as a member and later co-chairman of the Commission of National Inquiry, a commission set up to investigate events that occurred from January to February 2012 which includes the resignation of President Mohamed Nasheed. His appointment sparked controversy and calls for members on the commission to be as neutral and impartial.
