= Aishath Ali =

Maldivian politician

- ޢާއިޝަތު ޢަލީ
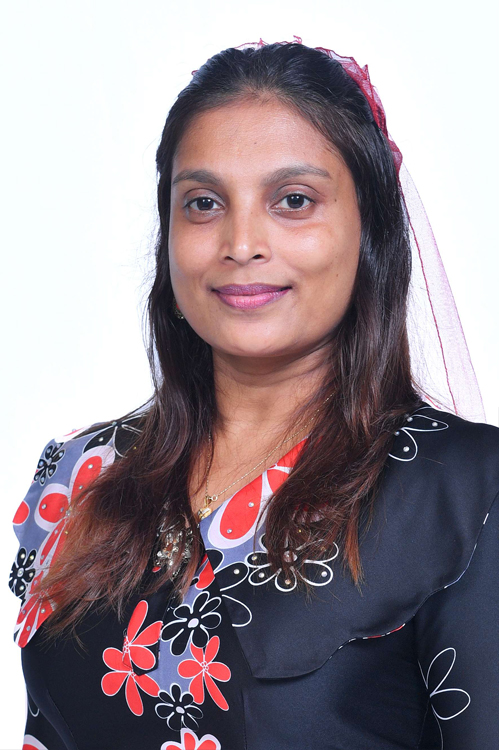

Minister of Education
- In office 17 November 2018 – 17 November 2023
- Appointed by: Ibrahim Mohamed Solih
- Preceded by: Aishath Shiham
- Succeeded by: Ismail Shafeeu

Personal details
- Party: Maldivian Democratic Party
- Education: University of the South Pacific; University of Western Australia (MA)

Aishath Ali (Dhivehi: ޢާއިޝަތު ޢަލީ) is a Maldivian politician who served as minister of education.

== Education ==
Ali graduated from the University of the South Pacific in 2004 with a gold medal and the John Gibbons Prize. She went to the University of Western Australia and did her master's degree in education management.

== Career ==
She was the registrar of the Maldives National University when it was established in 2011, later working at the Research Centre before working as a senior lecturer.

In 2018, President Ibrahim Mohamed Solih appointed Ali as the Minister of Education.
