= Aishath Azima Shakoor =

Maldivian politician and lawyer (born 1969)

- ޢާއިޝަތު ޢާޒިމާ ޝަކޫރު
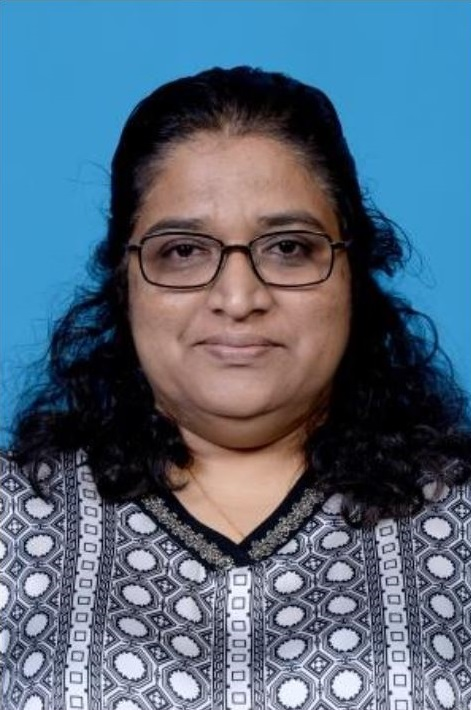
- Official portrait, 2016.

Minister for Legal Affairs
- In office 10 January 2016 – 17 November 2018
- President: Abdulla Yameen

Attorney General
- In office 1 July 2013 – 29 October 2013
- President: Mohamed Waheed Hassan
- Preceded by: Herself
- Succeeded by: Mohamed Anil
- In office 12 February 2012 – 10 April 2013
- President: Mohamed Waheed Hassan
- Preceded by: Abdullah Muizzu
- Succeeded by: Herself
- In office 31 October 2007 – 11 November 2008
- President: Maumoon Abdul Gayoom
- Preceded by: Hassan Saeed
- Succeeded by: Fathimath Dhiyana Saeed

Minister of Gender, Family and Human Rights
- In office 10 April 2013 – 1 July 2013
- President: Mohamed Waheed Hassan
- Preceded by: Fathimath Dhiyana Saeed; Mariyam Shakeela (acting)
- Succeeded by: Aamaal Ali

Personal details
- Born: 1 January 1969 (age 57) Maafannu, Malé, Maldives
- Party: Congress
- Other political affiliations: Dhivehi Rayyithunge Party
- Relations: Aminath Athifa (sister)

Uza. Aishath Azima Shakoor (Dhivehi: ޢާއިޝަތު ޢާޒިމާ ޝަކޫރު; born 1 January 1969) is a Maldivian politician and lawyer who served as the first female attorney general of the Maldives. She was attorney general from 2007 to 2008, 2012 to 2013 and again in 2013 to 2013. She also served as the President's Member of the People's Majlis.

== Career ==
Shukoor was formerly a deputy at the Ministry of Home Affairs and a member of parliament appointed by president Maumoon Abdul Gayoom. She was also a member of the Dhivehi Rayyithunge Party, serving as a member of the party council.

Shakoor served as the Attorney General from 31 October 2007 to 11 November 2008, under the presidency of Maumoon Abdul Gayoom, 12 February 2012 to 10 April 2013, under the presidency of Mohamed Waheed Hassan, and 1 July 2013 to 29 October 2013, under the same presidency.

In 2013, Shakoor was appointed as the Minister of Gender, Family and Human Rights by Maldivian president Mohamed Waheed Hassan.

In 2016, Shakoor was appointed as the Minister for Legal Affairs by president Abdulla Yameen.

In 2024, Shakoor ran for Mayor of Malé City during the by-election, where she lost to Ali Azim.
