= Ibrahim Fareed Didi =

Maldivian royal and politician

The Honourable Ibrahim Fareed Didi
- އިބްރާހީމް ފަރީދު ދީދީ
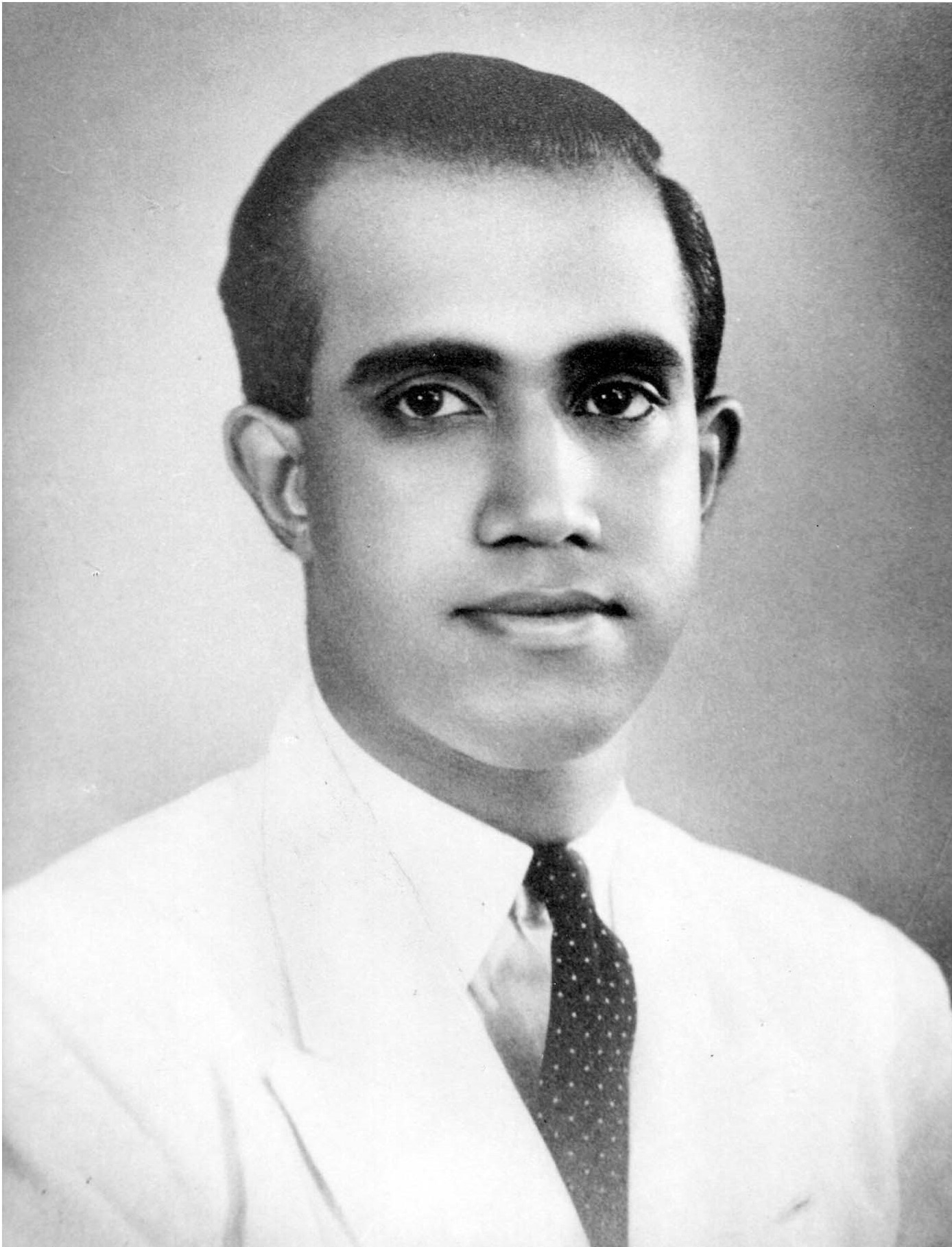
- Fareed, c. 1954

Speaker of the People's Majlis
- In office 1 March 1954 – 3 October 1959
- Monarch: Muhammad Fareed Didi
- Preceded by: Malim Moosa Maafayeh Kaleygefaanu
- Succeeded by: Ahmed Zaki

Vazeerul Ma'aarif
- In office 22 December 1952 – 21 August 1953
- Monarch: Muhammad Fareed Didi
- Preceded by: Abdulla Jalaluddin
- Succeeded by: Ibrahim Shihab

Personal details
- Parents: Sultan Abdul Majeed Didi (father); Princess Veyogey Dhon Goma (mother)

Prince/Al Nabeel Ibrahim Fareed Didi (Dhivehi: އަންނަބީލު އިބްރާހީމް ފަރީދު ދީދީ) was a younger son of Abdul Majeed Didi and Princess consort Famuladeyrige Didi. He was the brother of King Muhammad Fareed Didi of Maldives.

He served as the speaker of People's Majlis from 1 March 1954 to 3 October 1959.

He served as acting Minister of Justice from 1982-1983, and Deputy Minister of Justice from 1984.

He served as the Vazeerul Ma'aarif (Minister of Education) from 1952 to 1953.
