= Aishath Shiham =

Maldivian politician (born 1964)

- އައިޝަތު ޝިހާމް
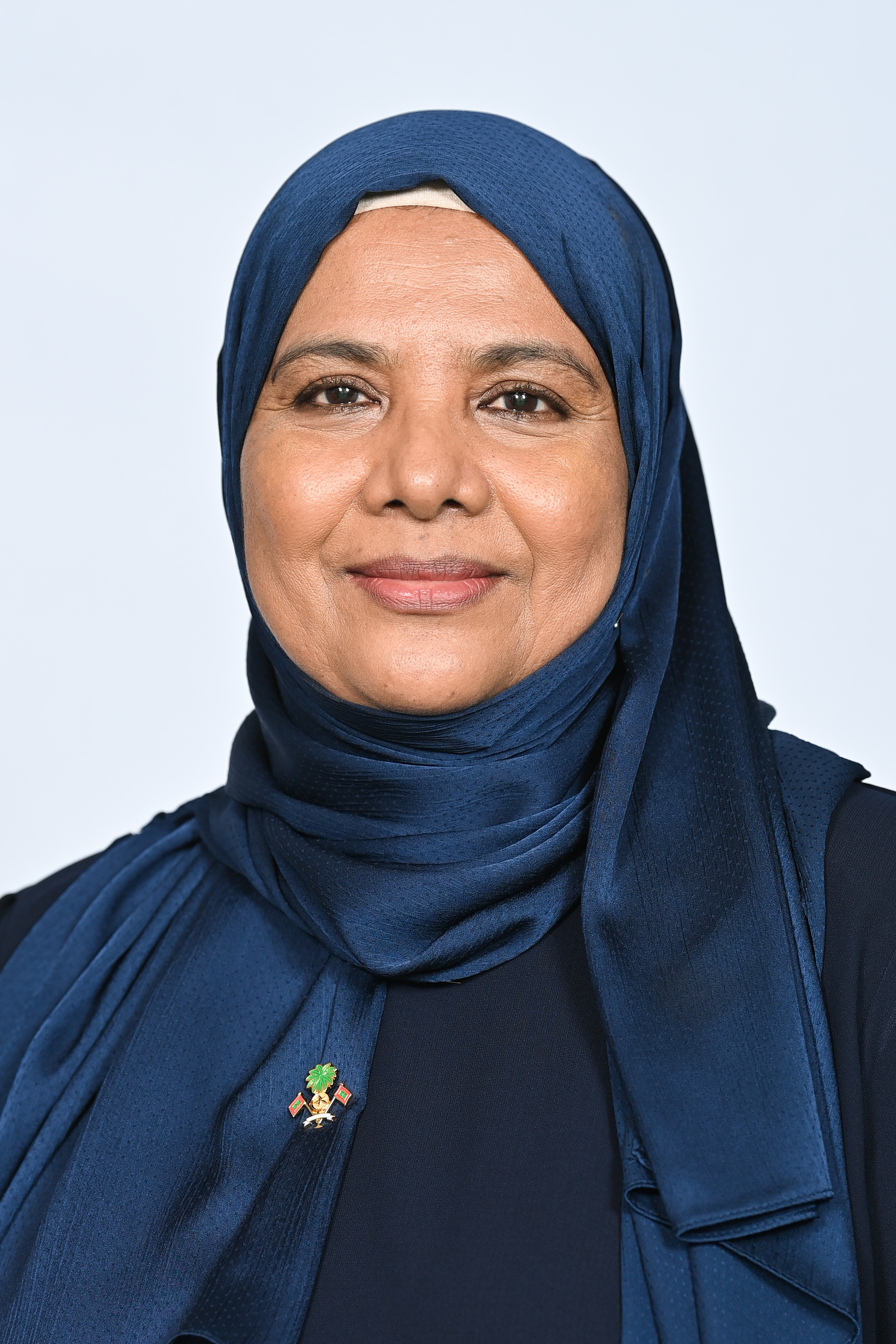
- Official portrait, 2023

Minister of Social and Family Development
- In office 17 November 2023 – 14 April 2026
- President: Mohamed Muizzu
- Preceded by: Aishath Mohamed Didi

Minister of Education
- In office 21 November 2013 – 17 November 2018
- President: Abdulla Yameen
- Preceded by: Asim Ahmed
- Succeeded by: Aishath Ali

Personal details
- Born: 15 February 1964 Galolhu, Malé, Maldives
- Party: People's National Congress (2018–present)
- Education: University of New Castle; University of South Pacific

Aishath Shiham (Dhivehi: އައިޝަތު ޝިހާމް; born 15 February 1964) is a Maldivian politician who served as the Minister of Social and Family Development in the Maldives from 2023 until her resignation in 2026.

== Education ==
She holds a Bachelor of Guidance and Counselling from the University of the South Pacific. She obtained a Master of Counselling Psychology, and a PhD in Psychology from Newcastle University.

== Career ==
She was formerly the Minister of Education from 2013 to 2018 as part of the Abdulla Yameen's administration.

She was appointed as the Minister of Social and Family Development on 17 November 2023 by President Mohamed Muizzu. On 14 April 2026, she resigned en masse with other cabinet ministers.
