= Hassan Farid Didi =

Maldivian politician

Prince Al Nabeel Hassan Farid Didi (1901 – 27 March 1944) was a Maldivian royal and a statesman. He was the Minister for Home Affairs, Finance, Minister of State and Plenipotentiary Representative in Ceylon.

Born as the younger son of Prince Abdul Majeed Didi, later Sultan Elect of the Maldives and Princess Veyoge Ruqia Don Goma, the daughter of Sultan Hassan Nooraddeen II, his elder brother Muhammad Fareed Didi was the last sultan.

Educated at the Royal College, Colombo in Ceylon, he returned to Malé in the 1920s. He was appointed treasurer and minister of finance from 1932 to 1942, and the Minister for Home Affairs from 1934 to 1939. During World War II, he served as Maldive's Plenipotentiary Representative in Ceylon from 1942 to 1944. He was killed while en route to Colombo when his ship, the 249-ton British naval trawler HMS Maaløy, was torpedoed by U-510, on 27 March 1944.
