= Mohamed Asim =

Maldivian politician (born 1960)

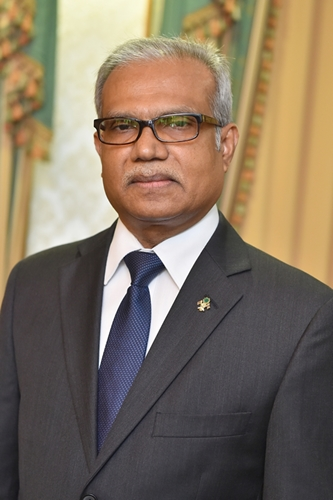
- Mohamed Asim in 2016

Minister of Foreign Affairs
- In office 13 July 2016 – 17 November 2018
- President: Abdulla Yameen
- Preceded by: Dunya Maumoon
- Succeeded by: Abdulla Shahid

Personal details
- Born: 1960 (age 65–66)
- Education: American University of Beirut; California State University, Sacramento; Australian National University

Mohamed Asim (born 1960) is a Maldivian civil servant and diplomat who has been Minister of Foreign Affairs of the Maldives 2016 to 2018.

He graduated from the American University of Beirut with a B.A. in Public Administration in 1983, and holds an M.A. from California State University, Sacramento and a PhD in political science and international relations from the Australian National University.

Minister Asim began his career in the Maldives civil service in 1983 at the President's Office. His first diplomatic appointment came in 2004, as the Maldives High Commissioner to Sri Lanka, with non-resident accreditation to Pakistan and Bangladesh. From 2007 to 2008 he served as the Maldives High Commissioner to the United Kingdom with concurrent accreditation to the European Union.

In 2013, Dr Asim was appointed as Head of the Maldives Mission to the EU. In 2014, he was transferred to the Ministry of Foreign Affairs as Ambassador-at-Large with responsibility for the East, Central and South Asia Divisions, and was responsible for coordination of bilateral matters with countries in that region. He served in that role until 2015, when he was appointed High Commissioner to Bangladesh. In 2016 he was appointed Minister of Foreign Affairs, succeeding Dunya Maumoon.
