= Asim Ahmed =

Maldivian politician and diplomat (born 1963)

- އާސިމް އަޙުމަދު
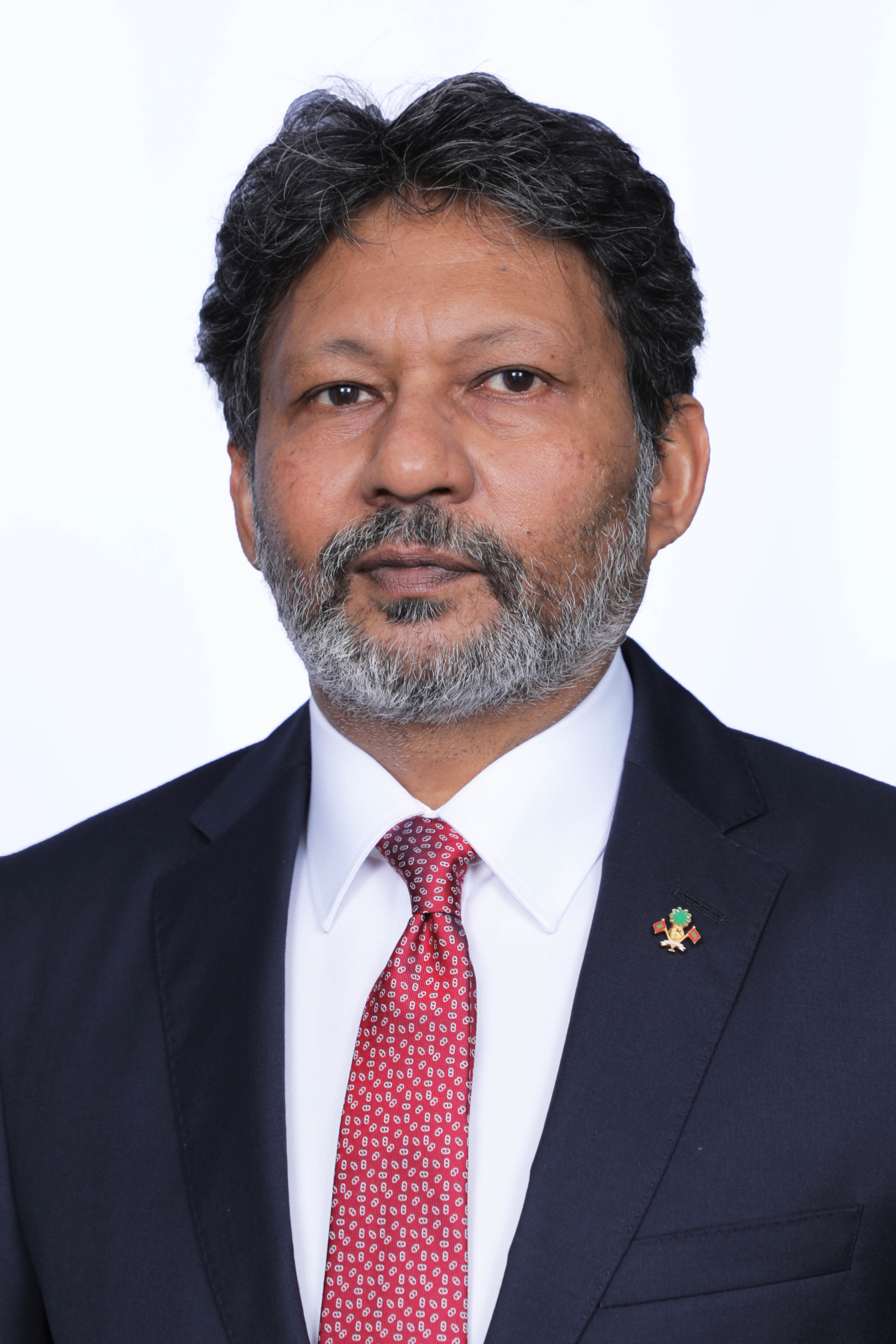
- Official portrait, 2020

Permanent Representative of the Maldives to the UNGA
- In office 10 August 2020 – 7 May 2024
- President: Ibrahim Mohamed Solih; Mohamed Muizzu
- Preceded by: Dr. Hala Hameed
- Succeeded by: Salma Rasheed

Acting Minister of Foreign Affairs
- In office 25 August 2013 – 12 September 2013
- President: Mohamed Waheed Hassan Manik
- Preceding: Dr. Abdul Samad Abdulla
- Succeeded by: Dr. Mariyam Shakeela

Minister of Education
- In office 16 February 2012 – 17 November 2013
- President: Mohamed Waheed Hassan Manik
- Preceded by: Shifa Mohamed
- Succeeded by: Dr. Aishath Shiham

Personal details
- Born: 7 January 1963 (age 63) Galolhu, Malé, Maldives
- Education: University of the South Pacific; University of Sussex; Victoria University of Wellington
- Awards: National Award for Special Achievement

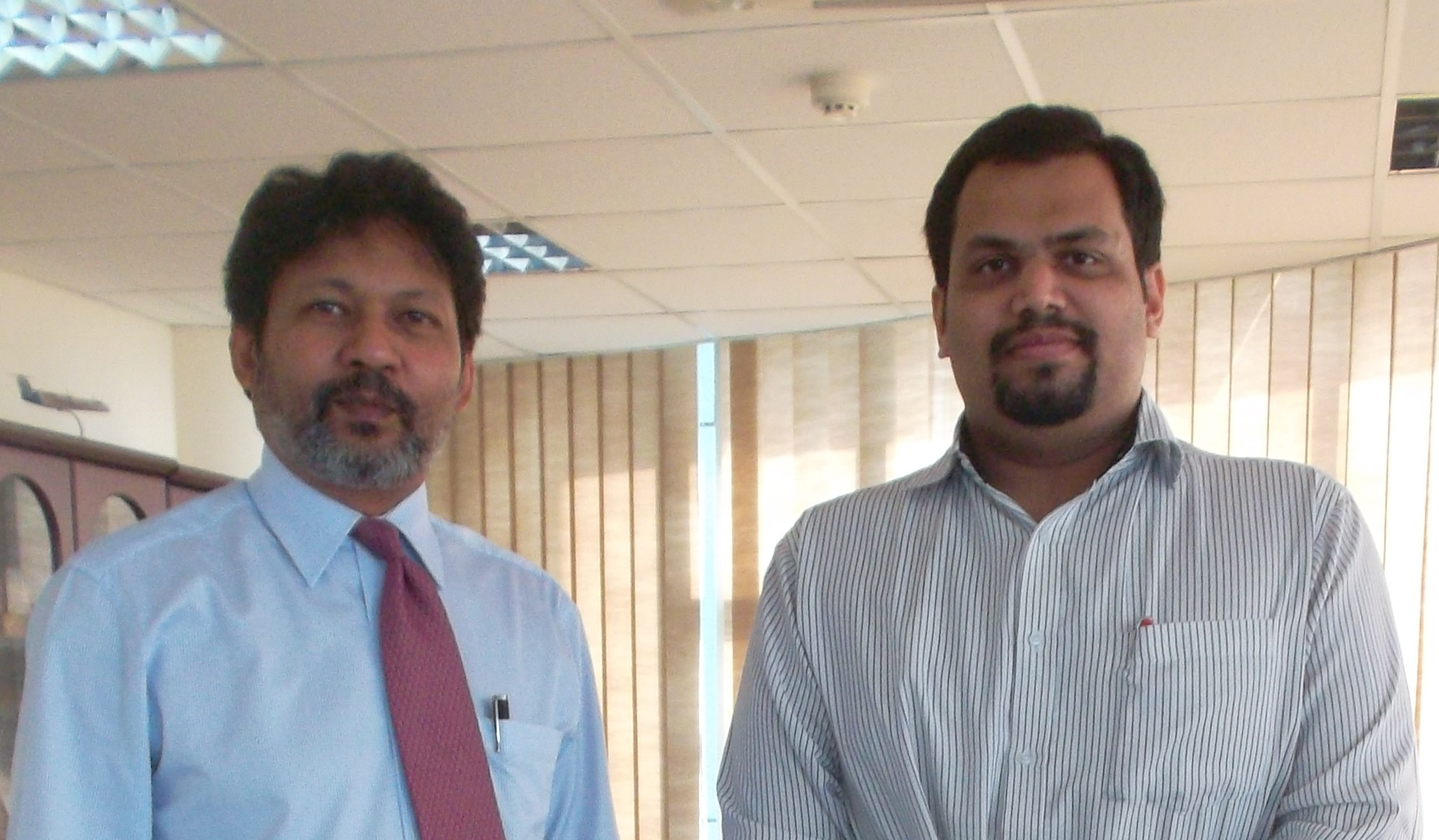
Maldivian Education Minister Dr Asim Ahmed with the Indian activist Dr Harikumar Pallathadka

Asim Ahmed (born 7 January 1963) is a Maldivian politician and diplomat who served as the Permanent Representative to the United Nations Office at Geneva from the Maldives from 2020 to 2024 and was approved for the tenure by the People's Majlis on 24 July 2020.

== Early life and education ==
Asim was born in January 1963. He received his Bachelor of Arts in Sociology and Politics from University of the South Pacific, Fiji in 1989. He has a Master of Philosophy in development studies from Institute of Development Studies at the University of Sussex in 1992. He has also received a Doctor of Philosophy from the Victoria University of Wellington in 2011. He was also conferred the National Award for Special Achievement by President Waheed.

== Career ==
Asim started his government service by becoming the Director for Strategic Planning at the now defunct Ministry of Planning and National Development in 1985. From 2011 to 2013, he played crucial roles such as acting Foreign Minister and Education Minister of Maldives. During this time he has been part of many Special Committees and Councils. From 24 March 2019 to 9 August 2020, he was the Ambassador-at-large and has represented Maldives at the United Nations General Assembly and the United Nations Human Rights Council.

He was the non-Resident Ambassador of the Maldives to Italy as well as the non-Resident ambassador to Switzerland, and Austria.

In 2022, he was elected as one of the four Vice Presidents of the United Nations Human Rights Council for 2023.
