= Ministry of Law and Gender (Maldives) =

2014–2018 Government ministry of the Maldives

- މިނިސްޓްރީ އޮފް ލޯ އެންޑް ޖެންޑަރު

Agency overview
- Formed: 1 July 2014
- Dissolved: 17 November 2018
- Jurisdiction: Constitution of the Maldives
- Headquarters: Velaanaage
- Annual budget: $20 million
- Minister responsible: Mohamed Anil
- Website: AG
- report offences under external link

Ministry of Law and Gender was a ministry established by President Abdulla Yameen on 1 July 2014.

Government agencies that were in this ministry were:

- Attorney General
- Home for People with Special Needs
- Kuda Kudhinge Hiyaa
- Amaan Hiyaa
- Educational Training Centre for Children
- Family and Children's Services Centres

It went under the newly formed Ministry of Law and Gender.Attorney General Mohamed Anil took over as the new minister of Law and Gender. This Ministry is now defunct.
