= Fathimath Dhiyana Saeed =

Maldivian diplomat (born 1972)

- ފާތިމަތު ދިޔާނާ ސައީދު
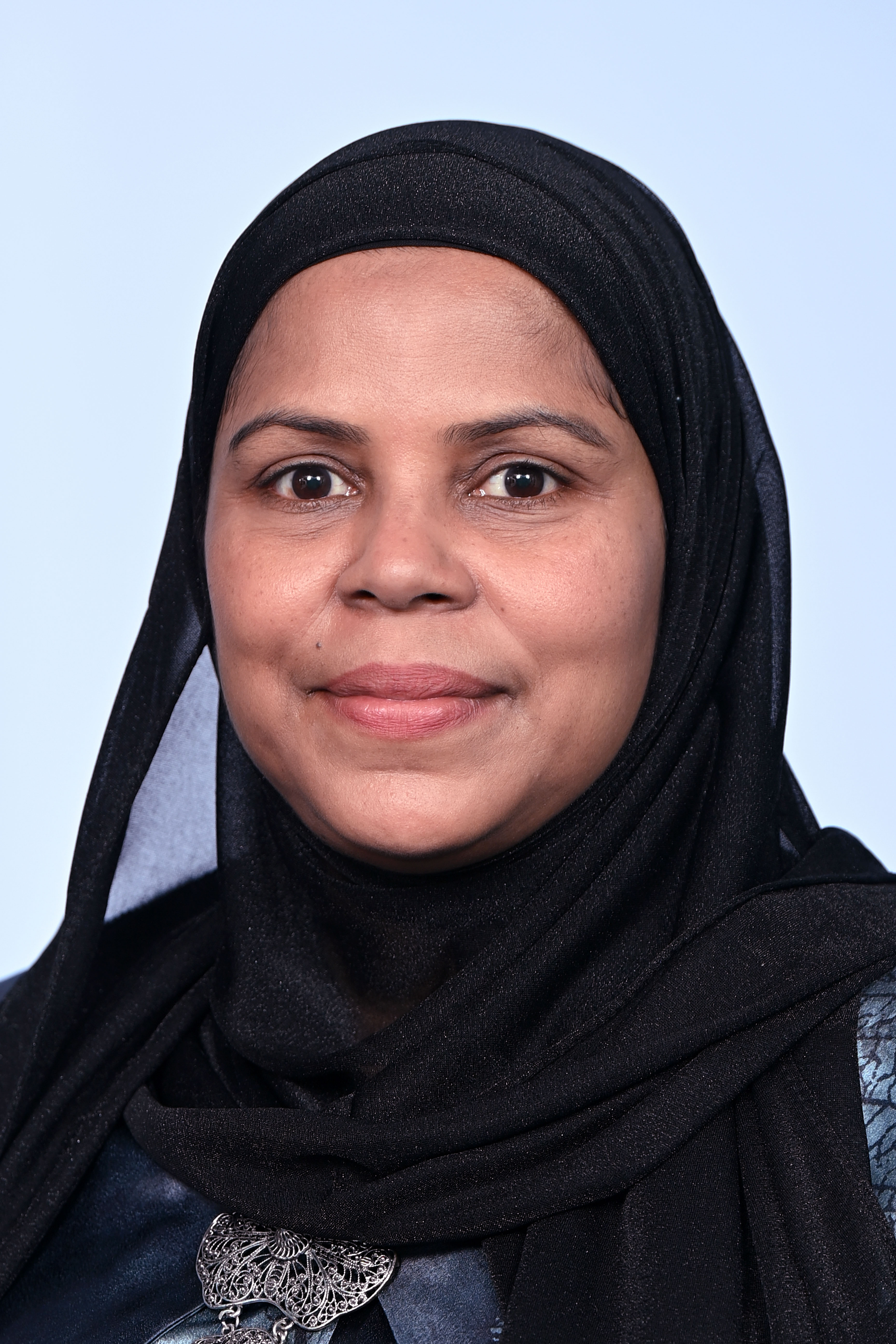
- Portrait, 2026

Minister of Gender, Family and Human Rights
- In office 7 May 2012 – 19 November 2012
- President: Mohamed Waheed
- Preceded by: Ministry created
- Succeeded by: Mariyam Shakeela (acting); Aishath Azima Shakoor

10th Secretary General of SAARC
- In office 1 March 2011 – 24 January 2012
- Preceded by: Sheel Kant Sharma
- Succeeded by: Ahmed Saleem

Attorney General of the Maldives
- In office 12 November 2008 – 19 May 2009
- President: Mohamed Nasheed
- Preceded by: Azima Shukoor
- Succeeded by: Husnu Al Suood

Personal details
- Born: 21 November 1972 (age 53) Hulhudhoo, Addu City, Seenu Atoll, Maldives
- Education: University of Tasmania (L.L.B); Osaka University (M.L.M.)

Fathimath Dhiyana Saeed (Dhivehi: ފާތިމަތު ދިޔާނާ ސައީދު; born 21 November 1972) is a Maldivian diplomat and politician who served as the Secretary-General of the South Asian Association for Regional Cooperation (SAARC). She was the first woman to hold this post since the organization's inception in 1985. She was appointed Secretary-General at the Thirty-third Session of the SAARC Council of Ministers in February 2011, and assumed office in Kathmandu on 1 March 2011. She succeeded India's Sheel Kant Sharma, whose term ended in February.

She was previously the Maldives’ Attorney General, and also served as the Maldivian Government's Envoy for South Asia. She holds a master's degree in law from the Graduate School of Law and Politics, Osaka University, Japan.

== Early years and education ==
Dhiyana Saeed was born in Hithadhoo (modern Addu City), Maldives. She obtained her primary and secondary education in the Maldives. In 2000, she acquired a Bachelor's Degree in Law (LLB) from the University of Tasmania in Australia. In 2004, she earned a Master's Degree in Law (LLM) from the Graduate School of Law and Politics at Osaka University, Japan.

== Politics ==
Dhiyana Saeed is a founding member of the Dhivehi Rayyithunge Party and has served as a member of its Executive Council. Later, she joined the Jumhooree Party and was elected the Leader of its Women's Wing. During these political stints, she has been a vocal proponent for legal reforms, human rights and gender issues as well as the consolidation of democratic governance in the Maldives.

== Career ==
Dhiyana Saeed started her legal career as a State Attorney at the Attorney General’s Office in 2000. As a State Attorney, she was responsible for providing legal opinion to the Government on all aspects of its dealings and for reviewing draft laws and regulations. She was promoted to the post of executive director in 2005. Earlier the same year, she was also appointed to the People's Majlis (Parliament) and by virtue of that appointment, she also became a member of the People's Special Majlis (Constitutional Assembly). As a member of the Parliament and the Constitutional Assembly, she played a key role in introducing a multi-party democracy to the Maldives and instituting constitutional and law reforms. She is especially credited for proposing a deadline to complete the constitution and a time-bound schedule to meet the proposed deadline.

=== Attorney General ===
In 2008, she was appointed as the attorney general of the first multi-party government in the Maldives. As the attorney general, she played a leading role to sustain the newfound democracy and the decentralization of powers in the Maldives.

On 18 May 2009, after 6 months as attorney general, president Mohamed Nasheed officially dismissed Dhiyana Saeed from her position. The President's Office later stated that this move was carried out in order to assemble a cabinet that has greater confidence within the opposition-ruled parliament. However, this move was also seen as a proving fact for the anticipated breaking of the coalition between the ruling Maldives Democratic Party and Jumhooree Party, of which Dhiyana Saeed was a member.

=== Envoy for South Asia ===
On 4 August 2010, President Mohamed Nasheed appointed Saeed as the Maldivian Government's Envoy for South Asia. She retained this post until 1 March 2011.

=== Secretary-General of SAARC ===
Dhiyana Saeed was the candidate provided by the Maldives, in nomination for the post of the 10th Secretary-General of SAARC. On 10 February 2011, she was appointed to the post by the Thirty-third Session of the SAARC Council of Ministers held in Thimphu, Bhutan. She assumed office in Kathmandu on 1 March 2011. She resigned on 19 Jan 2012 over a controversy for participating in a Maldives political protest alongside Ahmed Thasmeen Ali and Qasim Ibrahim and for her involvement in the internal politics of the nation, her resignation was accepted on 24 January 2012. This was the first time an SAARC secretary-general resigned prior to the expiry of their term since the organization's foundation in 1985.

=== Minister of Gender, Family and Human Rights ===
Following the creation of the Ministry of Gender, Family and Human Rights, President Mohamed Waheed Hassan Manik appointed Dhiyana Saeed as the Minister. On 19 November 2012, President Waheed dismissed Dhiyana as Minister and appointed Mariyam Shakeela as the acting Minister.

== Personal life ==
Dhiyana Saeed was married to Abdulla Jabir and has 2 sons.

== See also ==
- SAARC
