= Mariyam Shakeela (politician) =

Maldivian politician (born 1961)

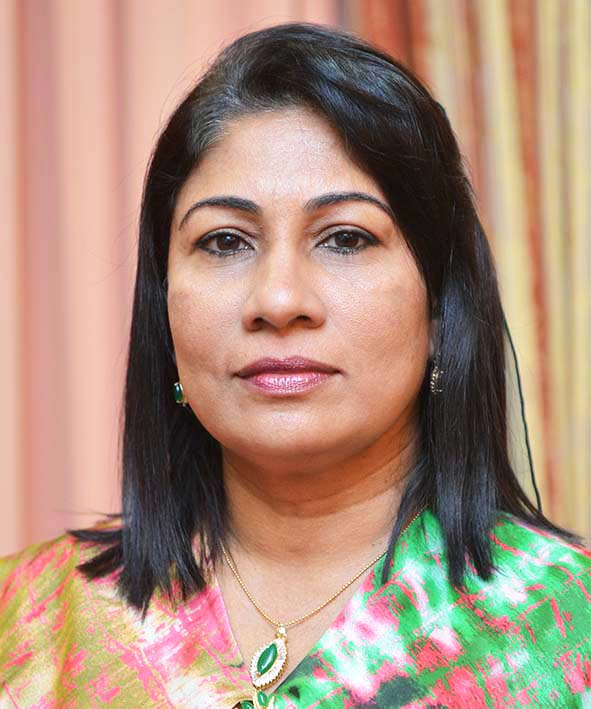
- Official portrait, 2014

Minister of Health
- In office 1 July 2014 – 11 August 2014
- President: Abdulla Yameen
- Preceded by: Dr. Aamaal Ali
- Succeeded by: Mohamed Nazim

Acting Minister of Foreign Affairs
- In office 12 September 2013 – 17 November 2013
- President: Mohamed Waheed
- Preceded by: Dr. Asim Ahmed
- Succeeded by: Mohamed Asim

Acting Minister of Gender, Family and Human Rights
- In office 21 November 2012 – 7 March 2013
- President: Mohamed Waheed
- Preceded by: Fathimath Dhiyana Saeed
- Succeeded by: Uza. Aishath Azima Shakoor

Minister of Environment and Energy
- In office 21 May 2012 – 17 November 2013
- President: Mohamed Waheed
- Preceded by: Ministry created
- Succeeded by: Thoriq Ibrahim

Personal details
- Born: 26 December 1961 (age 64)

Mariyam Shakeela (born 26 December 1961) is a Maldivian businesswoman and politician who served as the Minister for Health and Family and the Minister of Environment and Energy of Maldives.

== Biography ==
A doctoral graduate from Curtin University, Shakeela had worked as an Executive Board of World Health Organization and a Cabinet Minister in the Government of Maldives. She is one of the founding partners of the SIMDI Group which is an off shoot of one of the oldest companies in Maldives. She has reportedly headed profit and non-profit institutions, membership in international bodies and was considered one of an active Civil Society contributors of advocacy on Human Rights, building peace and security.

== Political career ==
On 21 May 2012, she was appointed as the Minister of Environment and Energy following the creation of the ministry. On 21 November 2012 she was appointed as the Acting Minister of Gender, Family and Human rights after the previous minister was dismissed. On 12 September 2013, she was the Acting Minister of Foreign Affairs. On 21 November 2013, she was appointed the Minister of Health and Gender which was abolished on 1 July 2014. (Note: Because of work load, the president of Maldives split the ministry into Ministry of Law and Gender and Ministry of Health. The President's nomination for Minister of Health to Shakeela was dismissed from the cabinet on 11 August 2014, after the Parliament voted against granting approval for her to continue in office. Following the rejection, Mohamed Nazim was appointed as Acting Minister of Health.) She now holds the position as Honorary Consul of Belgium in Maldives.
