= Ministry of Foreign Affairs (Maldives) =

Government ministry of the Maldives

- ޚާރިޖީ ވުޒަރާ Khaarijee Vuzaara

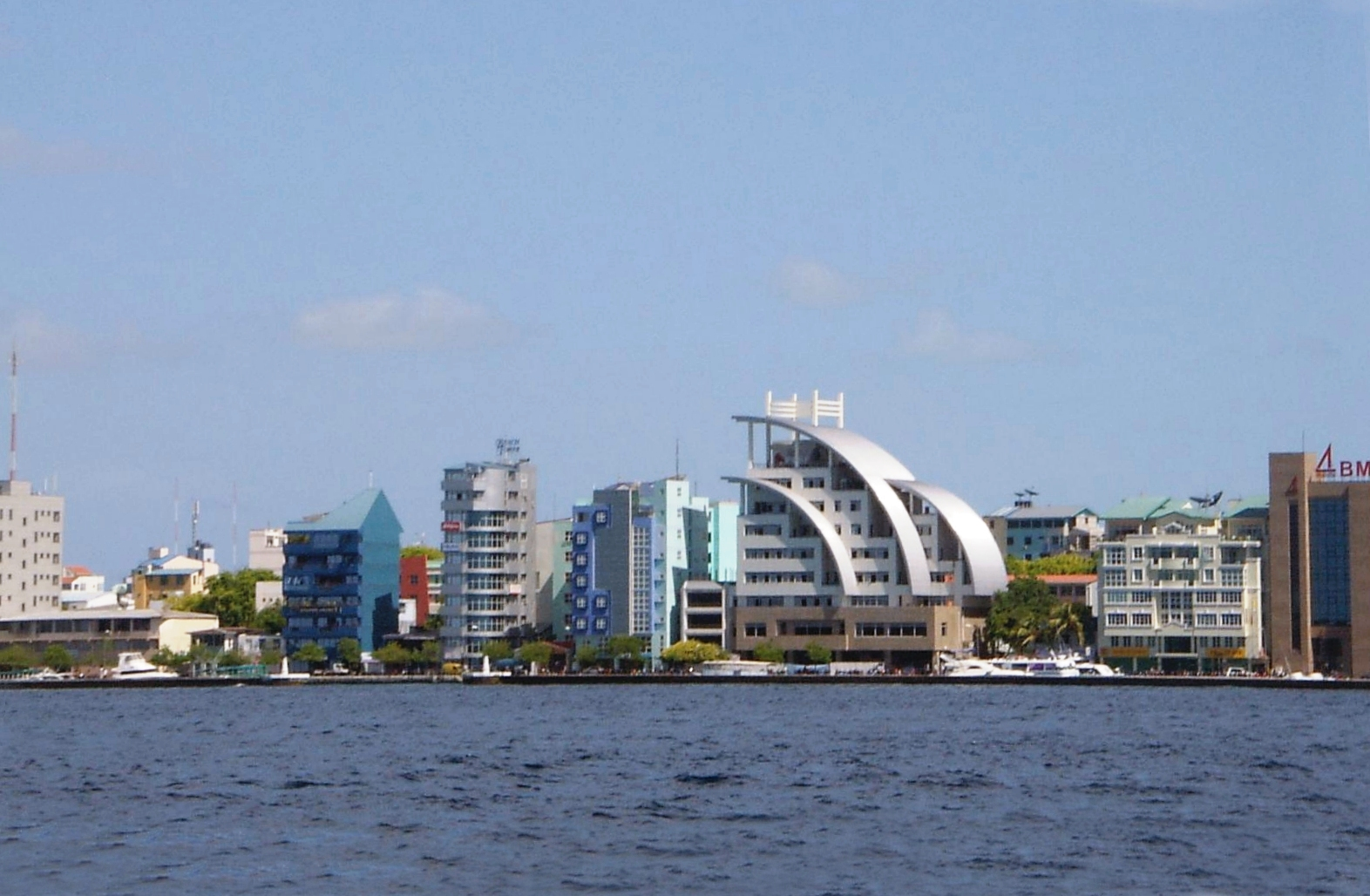
- The foreign ministry is housed in the building with curved roofs.

Agency overview
- Formed: 22 December 1932
- Preceding agency: Foreign Office
- Jurisdiction: Government of the Maldives
- Headquarters: Fathulla Jameel Building, Boduthakurufaanu Magu, Malé, Maldives
- Annual budget: MVR 154 Thousand
- Minister responsible: Iruthisham Adam
- Website: foreign.gov.mv

The Ministry of Foreign Affairs (Dhivehi: ޚާރިޖީ ވުޒަރާ) is a Maldivian government ministry that is responsible for managing the foreign relations of the Maldives.

== History ==
The Foreign Ministry was established on 22 December 1932 under the Arabic name Vuzarat Al-Kharijiyya (Arabic: وزارة الخارجية) on 22 December 1932 to handle the Sultanate of the Maldives' foreign relations.

On 5 July 1934, Vuzarat Al-Kharijiyya was renamed to Mahkamat Al-Kharijiyya (Department of Foreign Affairs). On 11 November 1968, the Mahkamat Al-Kharijiyya was renamed to the Ministry of External Affairs.

On 19 May 1975, the name was changed to the Department of External Affairs, before changing back to the Ministry of External Affairs on 11 March 1978.

On 10 November 1982, the Ministry of External Affairs was renamed to its current name, Ministry of Foreign Affairs.

In honour of the late Minister Fathulla Jameel, the Ministry of Foreign Affairs office building was renamed as the Fathulla Jameel building. The newly dedicated building was inaugurated by the president, Ibrahim Mohamed Solih.
