= Abdul Majeed Didi =

Head of the Sultanate of the Maldives

- Head of the Sultanate of the Maldives, Rannabandeyri Kilegefaanu; Al Munthakhab Li arshi Dhaulathil Mahaldheebiyya
- Abdul Majeed Didi
- Reign: 1944 – 21 February 1952
- Predecessor: Hassan Nooraddeen Iskandar II
- Heir: Crown Prince Muhammad Fareed Didi
- Born: 29 August 1873; Malé
- Died: 21 February 1952 (aged 78); Navaloka Hospital, Colombo, Ceylon
- Burial: 22 February 1952; Kuppiyawatte Muslim Burial Grounds, Colombo.
- Spouse: Kaashidhooge Dhon Goma and Dhon Didi
- Issue: King Muhammad Fareed Didi; Prince Hassan Farid Didi; Prince Ibrahim Fareed Didi
Names
- Al Ameeru Abdul Majeed Rannabandeyri Kilegefaanu
- House: Huraa
- Father: Ibraahim Dhoshimeynaa Kilegefaan
- Mother: Dhon Didi

Abdul Majeed (Dhivehi: އަލްއަމީރު އަބްދުލްމަޖީދު ރައްނަބަނޑޭރި ކިލެގެފާނު) (or Al Ameeru Abdul Majeed Rannabandeyri Kilegefaanu) (29 August 1873 – 21 February 1952) served as Head of the Sultanate of the Maldives from 1944 to 1952. At the time, the Maldives were a British protectorate. Didi is recognized a reformer and has been described as "the father of the modern Maldives".

He was fluent in Dhivehi, Urdu, English, Arabic and Sinhalese. Didi spent most of his life in Egypt. He served as the Vice Prime Minister during his father's time. He served as the Prime Minister of Sultan Muhammad Shamsuddeen III from 1926 to 1932. During his own reign, his son Prince Hassan Fareed Didi exerted significant control over the government through the Executive Council. After his death, the Maldives proclaimed its first short lived republican government under the pro-socialist president Muhammad Amin Didi. He also designed the flag of Maldives.

Abdul Majeed Didi died on 21 February 1952 in Ceylon. The first Maldivian school, Majeediyya School, was named after him.

Abdul Majeed Didi House of Huraa Born: 1873 (?) Died: 21 February 1952
Regnal titles
Preceded by Hassan Nooraddeen II	Sultan of the Maldives; 1944 – 21 February 1952	Vacant Muhammad Fareed Didi
