= Muhammad Fareed Didi =

Sultan of the Maldives from 1954 to 1968

- King Mohamed Fareed I/ Lord of the Thousand-Two-Hundred islands
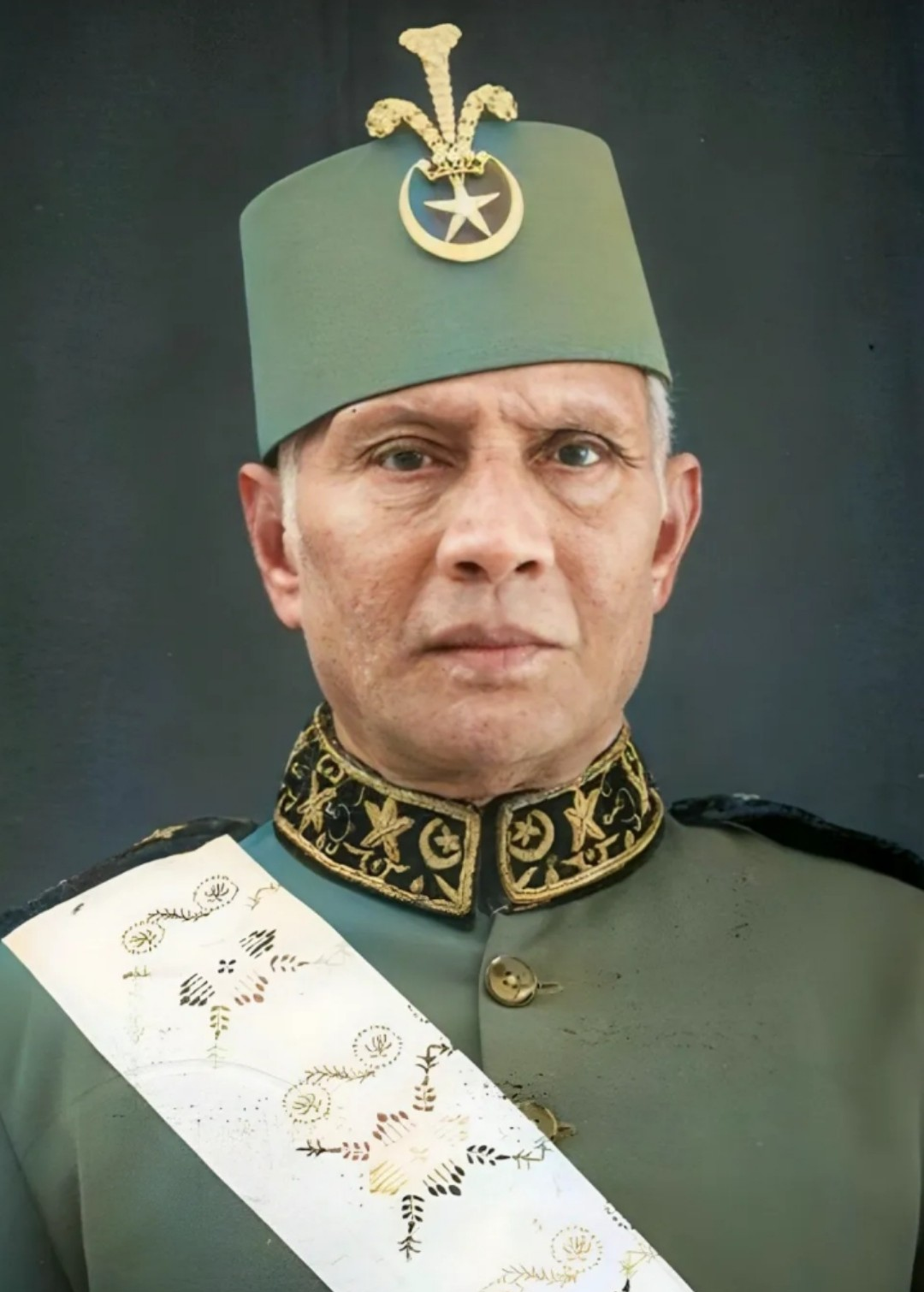
- Muhammad Fareed Didi in 1954

King of the Maldives
- Reign: March 7, 1954 – November 11, 1968
- Predecessor: Monarchy restored President of the Maldives (Mohamed Amin Didi)
- Successor: Monarchy abolished President of the Maldives (Ibrahim Nasir)
- Born: January 11, 1901; Malé, Sultanate of the Maldive Islands
- Died: March 27, 1969 (aged 68); Malé, Maldives
- Burial: Galolhu Cemetery
- Spouse: Mugurigey Waheeda, Buruneege Didi, Dhon Didi, Munaarudhoshugey thuthu goma
- Issue: Princess Fareedha Umar
Names
- Muhammad Fareed Didi
- House: Huraage
- Dynasty: House of Huraa
- Father: Abdul Majeed Didi
- Mother: Princess Veyogey Dhon Goma
- Religion: Islam

King Muhammad Fareed Didi އަލްއަމީރު މުޙަންމަދު ފަރީދު ދީދީ, Al'amīru Muḥanmadu Farīdu Dīdī) KCMG, (January 11 1901 – May 27 1969), the son of Abdul Majeed Didi Rannabandeyri Kilegefaan (Al Munthakhab Liarshi Dhaulathil Mahaldheebiyya), was the last Sultan of the Maldives and the first Maldivian monarch to assume the title of "King" with the style of "His Majesty". He was the Sultan of the Maldives from 1954, until 1965, and King of the Maldives from 1965, until 1968. He was deposed in 1968 from the throne when the Maldives became a republic, and died the following year in Maldives.

== Early years ==
He studied at Royal College Colombo in the British Colony of Ceylon. After spending 7 years in Ceylon (now Sri Lanka), he came back and became the prime minister of Sultan Hassan Nooraddine II on December 16, 1932. He served as the speaker of the People's Majlis from 1933 to 1942.

== Reign ==
After the fall of President Mohamed Amin Didi, a referendum was held and the country was again declared a Sultanate. A new People's Majilis was elected, as the former "People's Majilis" was dissolved after the end of the revolution. The members of the special majilis decided to take a secret vote to elect a Sultan, and Prince Mohammed Fareed Didi was elected as the 84th Sultan in 1954. His first Prime Minister was Ehgamugey Ibraahim Ali Didi (later Ibraahim Faamuladheyri Kilegefaan). On December 11, 1957, the Prime Minister was forced to resign and Velaanagey Ibrahim Nasir was elected as the new Prime Minister the following day.

On November 15, 1967, a vote was taken in parliament to decide whether the Maldives should continue as a constitutional monarchy or become a republic. Of the 44 parliamentarians, forty voted in favour of a republic. On March 15, 1968, a national referendum was held, in which 81.23% of the votes cast favoured establishing a republic. The republic was declared on November 11, 1968, thus ending the 853-year-old monarchy.

== Post-deposition and death ==
After his deposition from the throne, the King left the royal palace and retired to his own residence (Maabagychaage, now the parliament house) in Henveiru ward. He died on May 27, 1969, in Malé. He was given a state funeral and was buried in the Galolhu Cemetery.

Muhammad Fareed Didi House of Huraa Born: May 27 1901 Died: May 27 1969
Regnal titles
Preceded by Abdul Majeed Didi	Sultan of Maldives; March 7, 1954 – November 11, 1968	Monarchy abolished
Political offices
Preceded by Mohamed Amin Didi as President of the Maldives	Head of State of the Maldives as Sultan	Succeeded by Ibrahim Nasir as President of the Maldives
Titles in pretence
New creation Monarchy abolished	— TITULAR — Sultan of Maldives; November 11, 1968 – May 27, 1969; Reason for succession failure: Monarchy abolished in 1968	Succeeded by Prince Ibrahim Fareed
