= Hassan Nooraddeen II =

Sultan of the Maldives from 1935 to 1943

Hassan Nooraddeen Iskandar II
- Sultan of land and sea, Lord of twelve thousand isles, the Sultan of the Maldives
- Reign: Maldives: 1935–1943
- Coronation: 20 August 1938
- Predecessor: Muhammad Shamsuddeen III
- Successor: Abdul Majeed Didi
- Born: 21 April 1887; Malé
- Died: 15 April 1967; Maandhooge (old), Male
- Burial: 15 April 1967; Galolhu Royal Cemetery
- Spouse: Maabandeyrige Didi and Gaugey Didi
- Issue: Princess Sameemaa Nooraddeen; Prince Muhammad Nooraddeen; Prince Ali Nooraddeen; Princess Aneesa Nooraddeen; Princess Zareena Nooraddeen; Princess Fathimath Nooraddeen; Princess Haleema Nooraddeen
- Father: Sultan Muhammad Mueenuddeen II (Kuda Bandaarain)
- Mother: HRH Zulaikha Ranikilege Queen Consort (Dhandi kosheegey Didi)

Sultan Sir Hassan Nooraddeen Iskandar II, later on Al Ameer Hassan Nooraddeen Iskandar KCMG (Dhivehi: ސުލްޠާން ޙަސަން ނޫރައްދީން ދެވަނަ) was Sultan of the Maldives from 1935 to 1943, a son of Sultan Muhammad Mueenudheen Kuda Bandaarain.

He ascended the throne of Maldives on 22 February 1935; however his coronation ceremony was not held until 20 August 1938. After eight years of rule he abdicated on 8 April 1943, and lived thereafter at his own residence until his death on 15 April 1967, six days before his 80th birthday. The Prime Minister during his reign was Muhammad Fareed Didi.

Sultan Hassan Nooraddeen II was born on 21 April 1887 in Malé. He was the son of Sultan Mueenuddhin II. His mother is Dhan'dikosheegey Zuleikha Didi. He came to the throne on 23 February 1935, and was proclaimed Sultan on 20 August 1938.

The prime minister during his reign was Muhammad Fareed Didi. WWII began during this Sultan's reign and the British were given the use of some islands in Addu Atoll and a military facility for the British army, Navy, and Air Force were built on the atoll. Kelaa Island in Thiladhummathi Atoll was also used by the British. Maldives faced famine and great hardship during the period of war. Sultan Hassan Nooraddeen II was awarded the K.C.M.G. by the British in 1942 for services rendered by Maldives during the war.

The poll tax was abolished during Sultan Hassan Nooraddeen II's reign, instead duty was levied on certain trade items. The Maldivian Government Bodu Store started in 1942 to ensure that islanders received better prices than those they obtained from the foreign traders in Malé.

Sultan Hassan Nooraddeen II abdicated on 5 April 1943. He died on 15 April 1967 in Malé.

Preceded by Muhammad Shamsuddeen III	Sultan of the Maldives; 1935–1943	Succeeded by Abdul Majeed Didi
