= Attempted assassination of Mohamed Nasheed =

Terrorist incident in Malé, Maldives

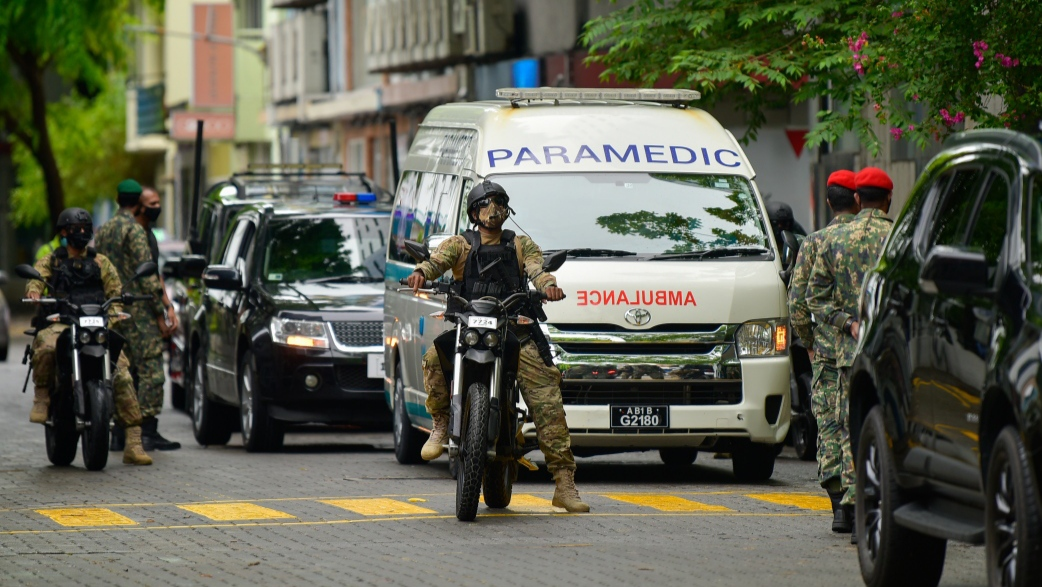
- Ambulance carrying President Nasheed after attempted assassination
- Location of the attack in Malé
- Location: 04°10′30.4″N 73°30′39.7″E; Malé, Maldives
- Date: 6 May 2021; 5 years ago 20:39 (MVT; UTC+5)
- Target: Mohamed Nasheed
- Weapon: Improvised explosive device
- Deaths: 0
- Injuries: 5 (including Nasheed)
- Perpetrators: Adhuham Ahmed Rasheed; Abdulla Ali Manik
- Motive: Religious extremism, Islamic extremism, Takfir Ideology, ISIS Inspiration
- Accused: 9
- Charges: Mujaz: Terrorism and aiding a fugitive; Thahmeen: Terrorism, conspiracy, support for a terrorist group, and transporting explosives; Haisham: Terrorism, conspiracy, and transporting explosives; Fahumy: Participation in an act of terrorism; Nazim: Conspiracy to commit terrorism; Ishaq: Transporting explosives, conspiracy, and participation in terrorism
- Verdict: Ahmed Adhuham – Guilty (23 years); Abdulla Ali Manik – Guilty (5 years); Mohamed Thasleem – Acquitted
- Convictions: Adhuham: Terrorism and Support for a terrorist group (Islamic State); Manik: Supporting a terrorist group (Islamic State)
- Convicted: 2

On 6 May 2021, an assassination attempt was made against Maldivian Speaker of the People's Majlis and former president Mohamed Nasheed near his home in Malé. At 20:39 MVT (UTC+5), a homemade explosive device planted on a parked motorcycle exploded, injuring Nasheed and four others. Maldivian authorities allege it to be a terrorist attack by religious 'extremists'. Three suspects have been arrested. The arrested suspects denied being involved; all three of them had prior criminal records.

Maldivian president Ibrahim Mohamed Solih described the explosion as "an attack on Maldives' democracy and economy" and has promised a "swift and thorough" investigation, warning that the perpetrators will "face the full force of the law".

== Background ==
Mohamed Nasheed was the first democratically elected president of the Maldives, serving from 2008 to 2012. At the time of the attack, he was the Speaker of the People's Majlis and the president of the Maldivian Democratic Party. Nasheed remained one of the most prominent and, at times, polarising political figures in the Maldives.

Media outlets described him as an outspoken critic of hate speech and extremism in the country. Religious leaders often accused him of pursuing an anti-Islamic agenda, while his supporters regarded him as a leading advocate for reform, democracy, and free expression.

The terror attack took place amid ongoing political debate and rising concerns over violent extremism and corruption in the Maldives. Notable previous incidents include a 2007 bombing by Islamist militants that injured foreign tourists; the killings of Afrasheem Ali in 2012, Ahmed Rilwan in 2014, and Yameen Rasheed in 2017; and a 2015 explosion on former president Abdulla Yameen’s speedboat.

Investigations into unresolved killings and disappearances were carried out by the Presidential Commission on Deaths and Disappearances (DDCom), while the Presidential Commission on Corruption and Asset Recovery investigated major corruption cases, including the Maldives Marketing and Public Relations Corporation corruption scandal. Nasheed had publicly criticised DDCom regarding the pace of investigations and the lack of charges. In April 2021, he requested additional information from the Asset Recovery Commission on behalf of a request by sitting member of parliament Hassan Latheef.

DDCom was later dissolved on 2 June 2024 by President Mohamed Muizzu, without publishing its findings, amid calls from civil society organisations including Human Rights Watch for the findings to be disclosed before its dissolution.

Human Rights Watch later noted the attack on Nasheed in the broader context of earlier violence and threats against politicians, journalists, bloggers, and activists who had criticised extremist groups. The organisation highlighted that Nasheed had been accused by political opponents of being an "enemy of Islam".

In the immediate aftermath of the bombing, the motive was not conclusively established. Al Jazeera reported that speculation centred on religious extremists and political opponents allegedly linked to corruption allegations, but no group claimed responsibility for the attack.

In response to various extremist threats and hateful rhetoric against Nasheed, the Defence Intelligence Service (DIS) branch of the Maldives National Defence Force compiled a threat history from 2018 onwards. Notably, during the People’s Majlis election campaign in 2019, the DIS raised the threat level to “substantial” on 25 April 2019 after receiving a specific threat to his life. Another instance observed by the DIS was a call by violent extremists on 9 September 2019 to kill Nasheed and members of parliament who voted to appoint the nation's first women judges to the Supreme Court of the Maldives. Some of these threats were posted on Twitter.

== Terror Attack ==
At approximately 20:27 UTC+5 on 6 May 2021, an explosion occurred as Nasheed was leaving his residence located in the capital city, Malé and approaching his designated car. The device, a homemade remote-controlled improvised explosive device (IED), had been placed hidden inside a motorcycle parked near Nasheed's residence, close to the intersection of Majeedhee Magu and Neelofaru Hingun.

Moments before the explosion, CCTV footage reviewed by investigators showed an individual later identified as Adhuham Ahmed Rasheed at Athama Palace restaurant located across the street on Majeedhee Magu. Police reported that Adhuham was seen speaking on the phone inside the restaurant shortly before the attack. According to police, Adhuham allegedly detonated the device remotely from within Athama Palace.

The parliamentary inquiry report by the Parliamentary Committee on Security Services noted that Adhuham was seen observing Nasheed from the vicinity of Athama Palace and moving briefly before the IED detonated. Following the explosion, several individuals were seen running toward the Athama Palace alleyway, while Adhuham quickly ran away from the scene. He was later captured on CCTV near Maldives National University, where he met another individual before the two departed in a taxi.

The device exploded just as Private Mohamed Rishwan, a member of Nasheed's security detail, was opening the car door for him. The blast caused Nasheed to lose his balance, but his fall was broken by his Personal Security Officer (PSO), Sergeant Ilham Adham. Nasheed sustained multiple shrapnel injuries and began bleeding profusely from various wounds. Three members of his security detail and two bystanders, including a British citizen, were also injured.

Nasheed was initially placed into his designated car at the scene, but when the vehicle failed to start, he was quickly transferred to a security vehicle and rushed to ADK Hospital. On arrival, members of his security detail, Private Mohamed Rishwan and Sergeant Ilham Adham, placed him on a stretcher and moved him to the Emergency Department.

== Medical Treatment & Recovery ==
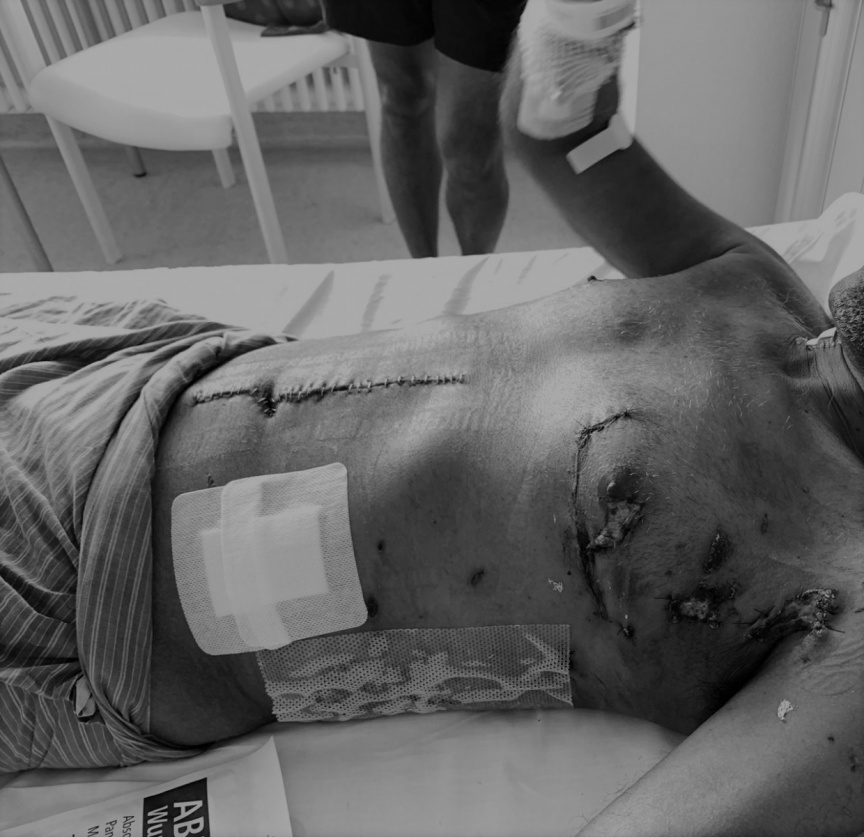
Image of injuries sustained by President Mohamed Nasheed following an IED attack on 6th may 2021.

Nasheed was treated at ADK Hospital in Malé, where he underwent emergency treatment and multiple surgeries. Hospital authorities stated that he underwent life-saving procedures for injuries to his head, chest, abdomen and limbs. Reuters reported that doctors removed shrapnel from his body and that he remained in intensive care following surgery.

The medical team was headed by Dr Abdulla Niyaf, the Chief Medical Officer of ADK Hospital. Dr Niyaf later testified that Nasheed arrived at the emergency department with extensive active bleeding, multiple injuries, with blood soaked clothes. He stated that the bleeding was severe and that Nasheed was transferred to the operating theatre after initial emergency treatment.

An initial assessment identified injuries to Nasheed's arms and legs, with significant bleeding. Doctors first worked to stop the bleeding and stabilise him before conducting a computed tomography scan (CT scan) to assess internal injuries. The scan showed that shrapnel had entered his chest, including areas near the heart and intestines.

Former President Nasheed flown to Germany by Air Ambulance. People's Majlis

According to Dr Niyaf's testimony, Nasheed's left lung had collapsed, and razor pellets had penetrated his ribs and entered his lungs. Razor pellets had also passed through his intestines, and additional pellets were removed from his thigh and other parts of his body. The surgery to remove razor pellets and other objects from Nasheed's body lasted approximately 16 hours.

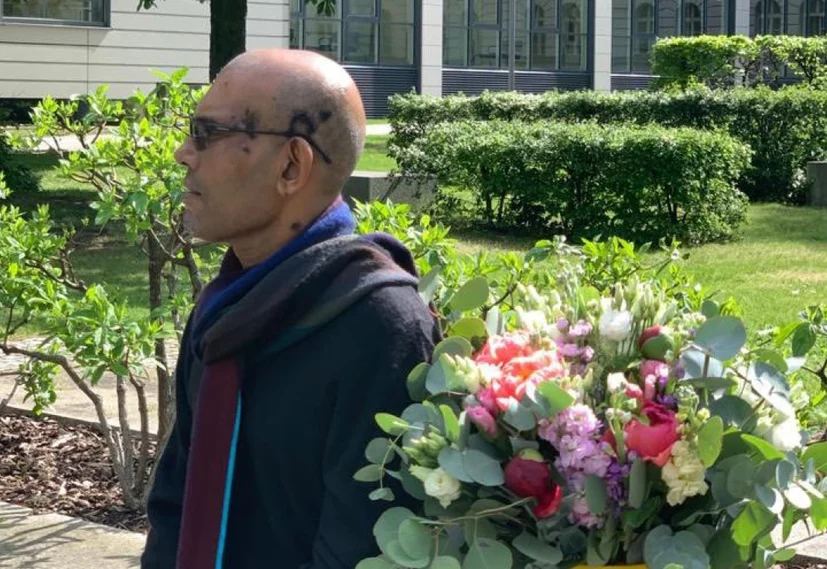
Nasheed recovering in Germany

Dr Niyaf also testified that one razor pellet had passed through Nasheed's liver and entered a major artery. He stated that this posed a serious risk to Nasheed's life and that doctors spent considerable time attempting to retrieve it. Nasheed was later transferred to the catheterisation laboratory, where doctors used a procedure normally used to remove stones to retrieve razor pellets from his groin area. During attempts to remove the pellet lodged in the artery, Nasheed's pulse briefly stopped, but he was revived after CPR and further medical intervention.

On 13 May 2021, Nasheed was discharged from ADK Hospital and flown to Germany for further treatment, rehabilitation and recovery. Associated Press reported that he was taken to the airport in an ambulance under heavy security and departed on a special flight. Cost of the air ambulance and his healthcare in Germany was covered by Christian Freiherr von Stetten, the Honorary Consul to the Maldives in Germany.

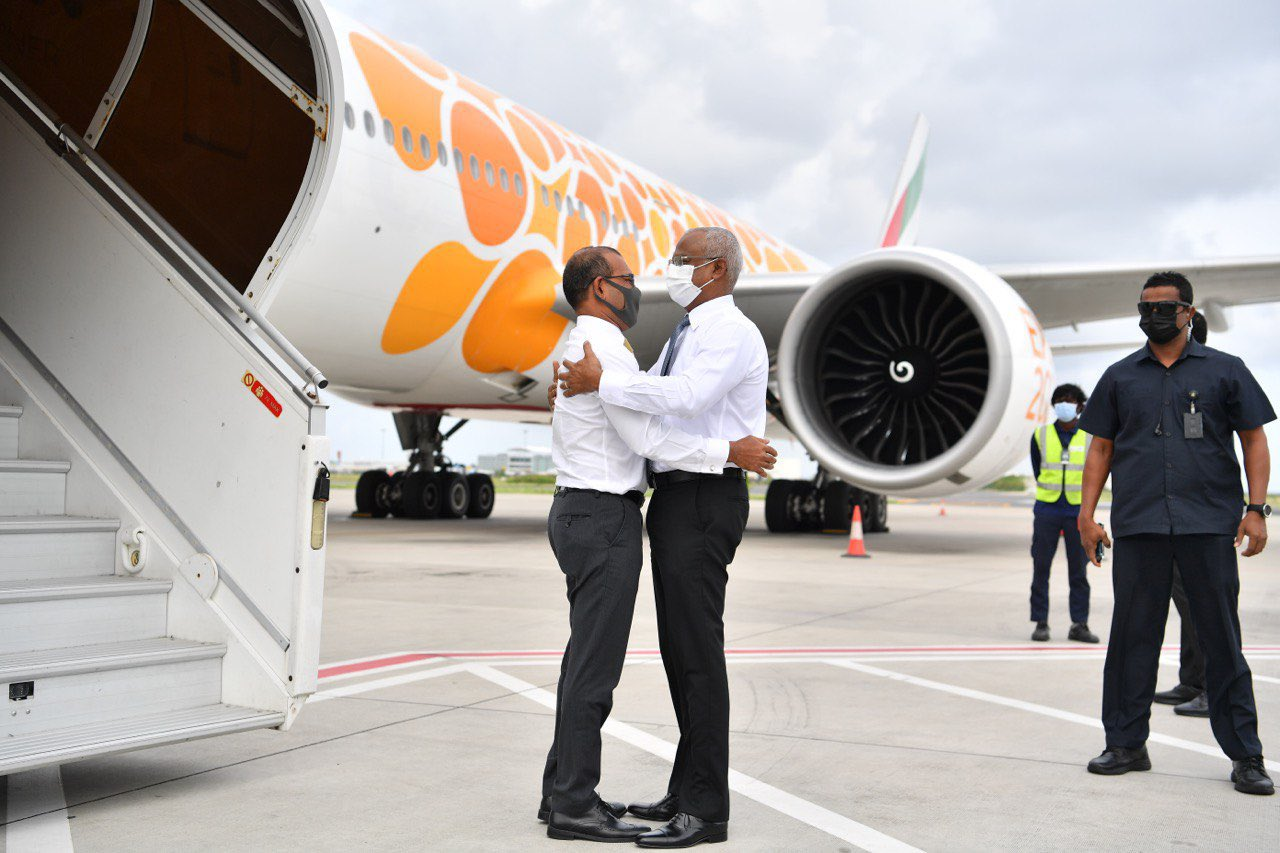
President Ibrahim Mohamed Solih welcoming Nasheed on his return to the Maldives on 11 October 2021.

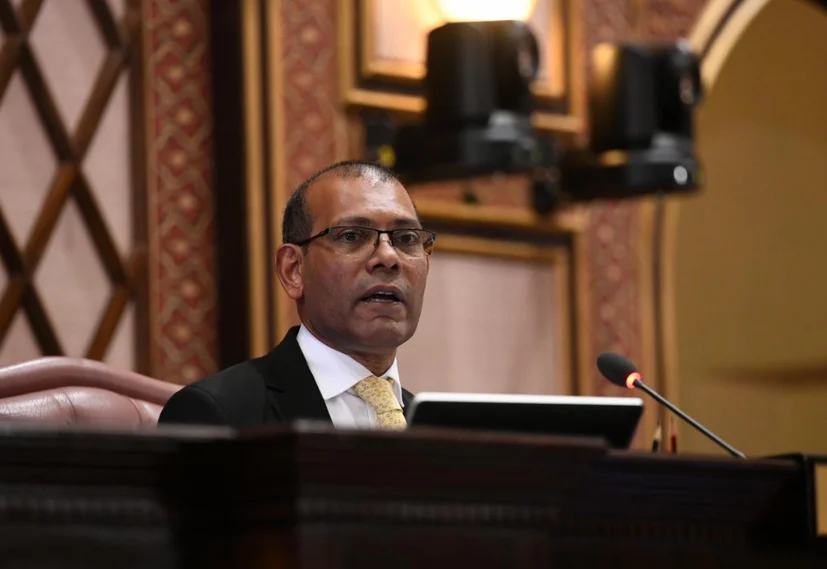
Nasheed rejoined a sitting of the People's Majlis as Speaker on 12 October 2021.

Nasheed returned to the Maldives after several months of treatment and rehabilitation abroad, and resumed parliamentary duties the following day.

Nasheed underwent an additional surgery on his leg in German military hospital and additional treatment and rehabiliatiton. Local outlets also reported he was required to attend follow-up reviews twice a week.

Nasheed would later return to the Maldives on 11 October 2021 after spending several months abroad for treatment and rehabilitation. He was welcomed at Velana International Airport by President Ibrahim Mohamed Solih and senior officials.

The following day, Nasheed rejoined a sitting of the People's Majlis as Speaker, returning to parliamentary duties after 150 days of absence.

== Investigation and Trial ==
Police Commissioner Mohamed Hameed said 450 officers had been deployed to investigate. Two experts from the Australian Federal Police were to be involved in the inquiry. This was the second time Australian authorities have helped the Maldives with an alleged assassination attempt, after a 2015 investigation into an explosion on then-President Abdulla Yameen's speedboat, while officials from the United Nations Office on Drugs and Crime and the United States Department of State had also offered support. Officials close to Nasheed's Maldivian Democratic Party (MDP) told Agence France-Presse (AFP) they believed he may have been targeted in retaliation for his anti-corruption campaign.

On 9 May 2021, Maldives police announced they had arrested their "prime suspect"—Adhuham Ahmed Rasheed—along with Mujaz Ahmed and Thahmeen Ahmed. The police attributed the attack to "religious extremists". The arrested suspects denied being involved; all three of them had prior criminal records. On the same day, the Parliamentary Committee on National Security Services began an inquiry into how Nasheed's security was breached. On 10 May, President Solih announced that a special team had been formed in the Prosecutor General's Office to handle the court case.

During 18–28 May, Police arrested Abdulla Ali Manik for spreading allegedly spreading extremist ideology, Ahmed Fathih for allegedly helping Adhuham escape the scene using his motorcycle, Mohamed Nazim, Hassan Yaseen, Mohamed Zumal Zareer, Ali Haisham, and three other suspected extremists.

On 6 July, Ishaq and Fahmy Ali were arrested.

On 11 July, the People's Majlis' Committee on National Security Services presented then–president Ibrahim Mohamed Solih with the inquiry report on the terror attack against Nasheed. The report which included recommendations was published on the People's Majlis website.

On 21 July, Police completed their investigation and submitted charges to the Prosecutor General's Office (PGO) against Adham, Mujaz, and Thahumeen.

On 24 July, Police arrested Mohamed Thasleem and was accused of manufacturing the IED and leading an extremist cell targeting Nasheed. On the same day, police revealed that Ali Haisham, Fahmy Ali, Ishaq, Abdulla Ali Manik, Mohamed Thasleem, and Mohamed Nazim were formally accused in relation to the case.

On 3 August, Adhuham was charged with terrorism, conspiracy, supporting a terrorist group, and attempted murder, which he pleaded guilty and signed a plea deal and the charges were reduced to terrorism and supporting a terrorist group; Mujaz was charged with terrorism and aiding a futigive; Thahumeen was charged with terrorism, conspiracy, support for a terrorist group, and transporting explosives; Haisham was charged with terrorism, conspiracy, and transporting explosives.

Yaseen and Zumal had been charged with supporting or being a part of a terrorist association.

The government has said that the suspects arrested are supporters of ISIS.

On 6 August, Ahmed Fathih was released due to lack of evidence.

On 16 August, a three-judge panel was formed to hear the case, consisting of Adam Mohamed, Sofwath Habeeb, and Mohamed Misbah.

On 25 August, Yaseen denied all charges against him.

On 13 September, Fahmy was charged with participation in an act of terrorism; Nazim was charged with conspiracy to commit terrorism; Ishaq was charged with transporting explosives, conspiracy, and participation in terrorism.

On 21 September, Adhuham plead guilty to all the charges. Mujaz, Thahumeen, and Haisham denied the charges and their trials were held separately from Adhuham since he accepted the plea deal.

On 21 October, Haisham, Fahmy and Nazim plead not guilty in their second preliminary hearing and the court denied their request for a closed-door trial. Thasleem and Manik were charged with for supporting a terrorist group.

On 14 December, Adhuham was sentenced to twenty three years, six months, and nine days in prison.

On 9 January 2022, Thasleem and Abdulla Ali Manik has denied their charges and claimed that they can't be supporters as ISIS was defunct, which on 26 January, the court disagreed.

On 16 March, Nazim, Yaseen, and Zumal denied charges of supporting extremism although having ISIS propaganda in possession.

On 28 March, first evidence was presented against Thasleem and Manik were presented. The court announced future hearing dates.

On 15 May, trial schedules for the remaining defendants were announced, the prosecution requested confidentiality for twenty two evidence pieces with the defence requesting the same for six.

On 12 June, Judge Adam Mohamed recused himself from the bench after announcing that Ishaq sent him a letter which stated that his son threatened the judge during the trial of Yameen Rasheed—a blogger who got murdered—which one of the defendants was his uncle.

On 15 June, Police alleged that Thasleem was identified as the IED expert and Manik attacked three tourists in 2020 as revenge for the state taking custody of his kids for not completing vaccinations and sending them to school.

On 21 June, Judge Dheebanaz Fahumy was appointed as the chair of the bench.

On 24 August, Judge Hussain Faiz replaced Judge Dheebanaz Fahumy as she was appointed to the High Court.

On 28 November, the judge panel was dissolved and the case was reassigned to Judge Sofwath Habeeb,

The Criminal Court has scheduled to give a verdict before 31 August 2023.

On 21 May 2023, the Criminal Court rejected two of Thahmeen's witnesses, which the High Court ordered the Criminal Court to accept the witnesses.

In September, Abdulla Ali Manik was found guilty of supporting a terrorist organization and Ahmed Thasleem was acquited of his charge.

In December, the PGO appealed against Thasleem's acquital.

=== Concerns ===
Concerns were raised by Abbas Faiz—special envoy to the Maldivian government to monitor the investigation, prosecution, and trial process of the terrorist attack against Nasheed—about the delays in the trials of the suspects involved in the case. He noted that "Only one case received a trail [sic]. Others only in pre-trial stage." In response, the Criminal Court has said that the case is being delayed as one of the judges is on leave.

Prosecutor General Hussain Shameem had also raised concerns over delays. Additionally, the People's Majlis (parliament) raised concerns and described 6 May as a "dark day in Maldivian history."

In May 2022, a hearing was cancelled due to bad weather delays in transporting the prisoners. Nasheed's lawyers condemned this and has said "using the bad weather as an excuse was unacceptable".

Abbas Faiz had additionally raised concerns again in 2023 after stating that the "judicial authorities have not offered him an acceptable reason for the delay in the trial."

== Casualties ==
Nasheed underwent 16 hours of surgery for injuries to his head, chest, abdomen, and limbs. Multiple pieces of shrapnel were removed during surgery, including one lodged a centimetre away from his heart. Agence France-Presse also reported that the bomb was filled with ball bearings to increase the damage caused. By 8 May, Nasheed's condition had improved so that he could be taken off life support, although he remained in intensive care. His condition remained stable, and he recovered after undergoing multiple emergency surgeries. The hospital treating the former president said he was in a critical condition in intensive care on 7 May after surgery to his head, chest, abdomen and limbs.

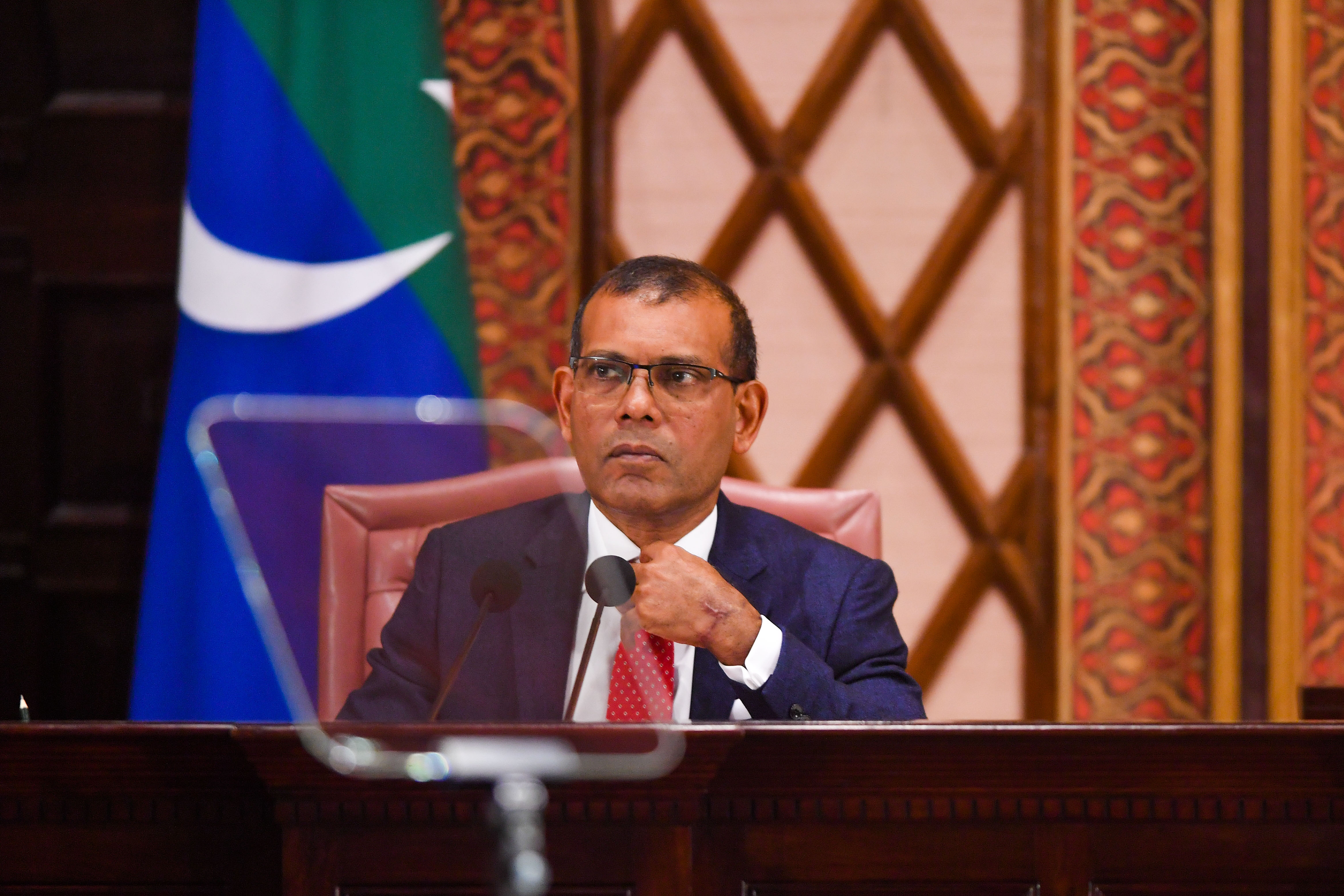
Nasheed after returning to parliament

On 13 May 2021, Nasheed was flown to Germany for further medical treatment after being seriously injured along with three other people. He returned to the country on 11 October 2021, and resumed his duties as speaker.
