= Shahindha Ismail =

Maldivian human rights activist

Founder of the MDN
- In office June 2005 – February 2023

President of the Maldives Police Integrity Commission
- In office July 2009 – October 2012

Member of Prison Audit Commission
- In office 75 days

Shahindha Ismail is a Maldivian human rights activist who is the founder and executive director of the Maldivian Democracy Network, the first and longest running human rights NGO in the Maldives. She has served as the President of the Police Integrity Commission and as a member of the Prison Audit Commission. She is one of a few advocates against religious fundamentalism in the Maldives.

== Work in the Maldives ==
Shahindha began her activism in 2004 during the mass arrest of over 300 people on the 12th and 13 August 2004, events that subsequently became known as Black Friday. She launched MDN as the Maldivian Detainee Network.

Following the subsequent turn to democracy in the Maldives, she had a leading role in a nationwide 'Go Vote' campaign for the first multi-party presidential election in 2008, the successful campaign to disqualify unfair amendments to the Civil Service Act in 2008, and worked on nationwide awareness programs on detainee rights and the Chapter of Rights of the Constitution.

The new President Mohamed Nasheed appointed her as President of the Police Integrity Commission. In October 2012, she resigned in protest of the policing crisis following the 2012 Maldives political crisis.

She has consistently opposed implementation of the death penalty, most notably in the case of Hussain Humaam, who was convicted for the 2012 murder of Afrasheem Ali MP for Ungoofaaru. MDN appealed the lower court decision at the High Court which issued a stay order. The Supreme Court reversed this decision in a controversial ruling. No executions have taken place so far.

In 2017, she was investigated by the Maldives Police Service for a tweet she posted in response to a speech by then President Abdulla Yameen Abdul Gayoom, in which she defended Maldivian's right to freedom of religion, following a series of articles written in the online tabloid Vaguthu. The Asian Forum for Human Rights (FORUM-ASIA), the Observatory for the Protection of Human Rights Defenders (an FIDH-OMCT partnership), Front Line Defenders and Amnesty International called on the Maldivian government "to immediately end the targeted harassment and intimidation" against her. She received death threats over the incident.

Within the context of the 2018 Maldives political crisis the European Parliament passed a resolution regarding the situation in the Maldives, noting that Shahindha faced intimidation from religious extremists and harassment from government authorities.

She authored the book "Gelluvaalee Mausoom Dhivehi Dharieh", loosely translating to '[They] Disappeared an Innocent Maldivian' a biography of the abducted and murdered journalist Ahmed Rilwan released by his family.

In 2018, she was appointed to the Prison Audit Commission, a seven-member commission created by the Ministry of Home Affairs to conduct an audit of all prisons in the Maldives which found that inmates had been kept against international frameworks, and local laws and regulations.

== Exile ==
She has been living in exile in Germany since 2019.
