= Hassan Ugail =

Maldivian mathematician (born 1970)

- ޙަސަން ޢުޤައިލް
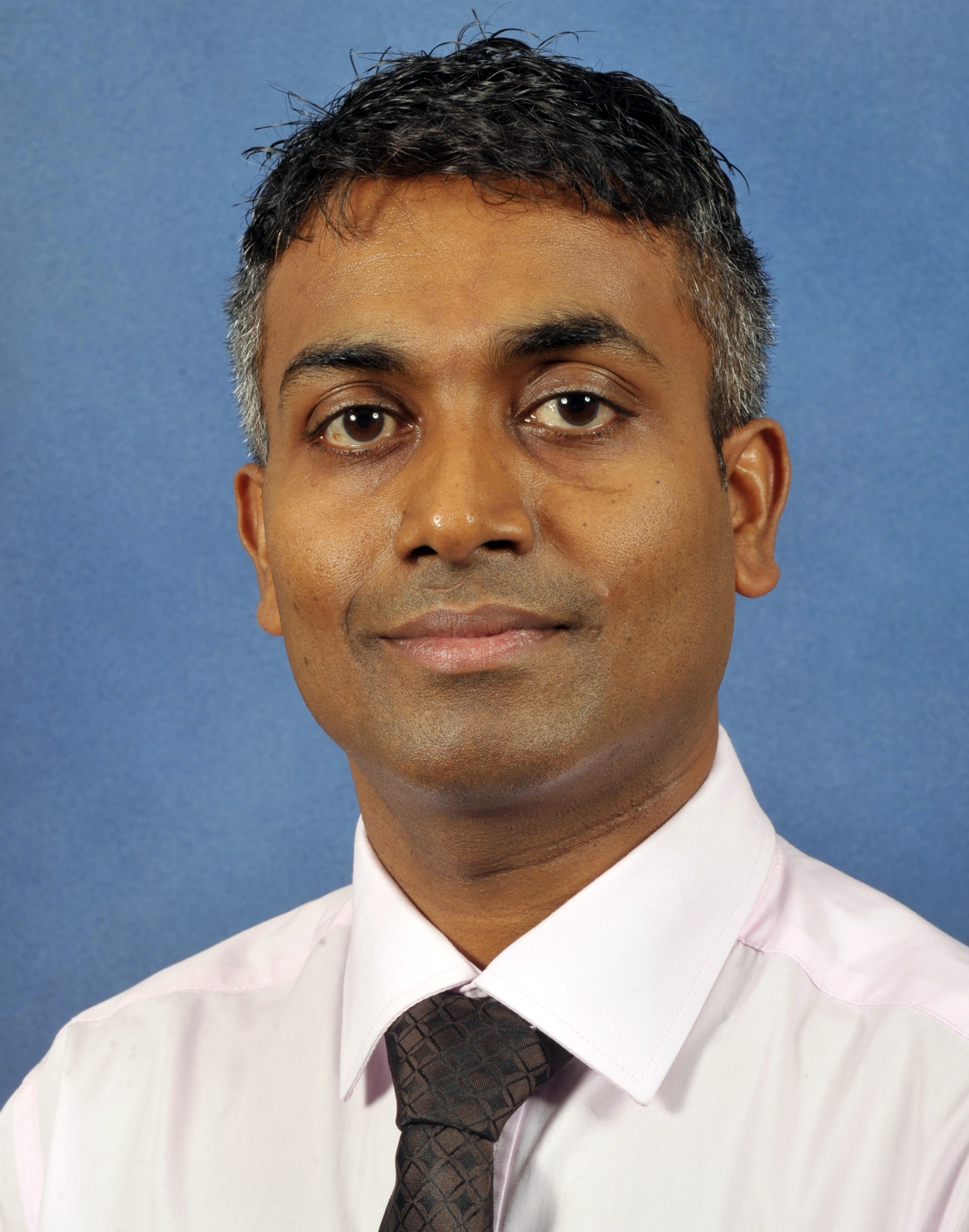
- Ugail in 2011
- Born: 24 September 1970 (age 55); Hithadhoo, Addu City, Seenu Atoll, Maldives
- Education: King's College London (BSc 1995, PGCE 1996); University of Leeds (PhD 1999)
- Scientific career
- Fields: Visual Computing
- Workplaces: University of Leeds Research Fellow (2000–2002), University of Bradford (2002–present)
- Thesis: Design, analysis and optimisation in an interactive environment (1999)

Hassan Ugail (Dhivehi: ޙަސަން ޢުޤައިލް; born 24 September 1970) is a Maldivian mathematician and computer scientist. He is a professor of visual computing at the Faculty of Engineering and Informatics at the University of Bradford.

== Early life and education ==
Hassan Ugail was born in Hithadhoo, Addu City, in Seenu Atoll, Maldives. In 1987, he moved to Malé to continue his education at the English Preparatory And Secondary School and at the Centre for Higher Secondary Education. In 1992, he received a British Council scholarship to continue his studies in the UK. Ugail received a BSc degree in Mathematics in 1995 and a postgraduate certificate in 1996, both from King's College London. He earned his PhD in Visual Computing at the University of Leeds in 1999. His doctoral research focused on the application of partial differential equations in interactive surface design.

== Career ==
After completing his PhD, Ugail worked as a post-doctoral research fellow at the Department of Applied Mathematics at University of Leeds until September 2002. He then became a lecturer at the School of Informatics at the University of Bradford. He was appointed as a senior lecturer in April 2005, and became a professor in 2009. In 2010, Ugail received the Vice-Chancellor's Excellence in Knowledge Transfer Award from the University of Bradford. In 2011, Ugail received the Maldives National Award for Innovation for his work in the field of visual computing. Ugail is the director of the Centre for Visual Computing at the University of Bradford.

Ugail is known for his work on computer-based human face analysis including facial recognition, face ageing, emotion analysis and lie detection. In 2018, Ugail worked with Bellingcat journalists to verify the identities of two suspected Russian spies involved in the Salisbury Novichok poisoning case. In 2019, he helped the Commission on Deaths and Disappearances to investigate cold cases such as Ahmed Rilwan, Yameen Rasheed and Afrasheem Ali via his lie detection services as well as his face-recognition system. In 2020, BBC News investigators consulted Ugail as an expert in facial mapping to identify an alleged Nazi war criminal. As of 2023, Ugail's team is working on image analysis as part of a project to assess the quality of human organs for transplant. The project is supported by NHS Blood and Transplant, Quality in Organ Donation biobank, and the National Institute for Health and Care Research.

== Bibliography ==
- Ugail, Hassan (2022). Deep Learning in Visual Computing, Explanations and Examples.
- Ugail, Hassan (2020). Multidisciplinary Data Visualization.
- Ugail, Hassan (2019). Computational Techniques for Human Smile Analysis.
- Ugail, Hassan (2011). Partial Differential Equations for Geometric Design.
