= Health in the Maldives =

The Human Rights Measurement Initiative finds that Maldives is fulfilling 72.0% of what it should be fulfilling for the right to health based on its level of income. When looking at the right to health with respect to children, Maldives achieves 98.0% of what is expected based on its current income. In regards to the right to health amongst the adult population, the country achieves 99.7% of what is expected based on the nation's level of income. Maldives falls into the "very bad" category when evaluating the right to reproductive health because the nation is fulfilling only 18.2% of what the nation is expected to achieve based on the resources (income) it has available.

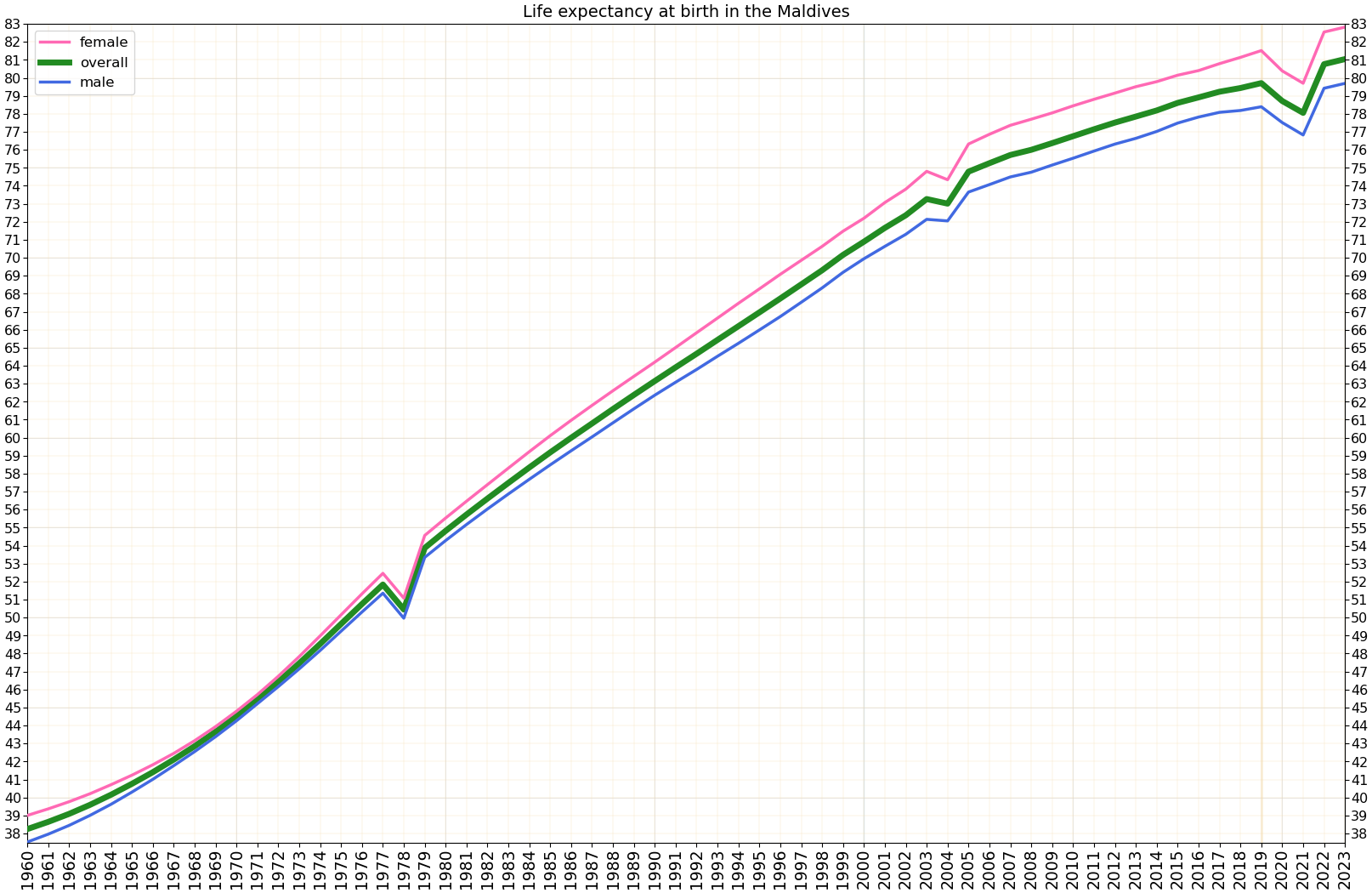
Life expectancy in the Maldives

Life expectancy at birth in Maldives was 77 years in 2011. Infant mortality fell from 34 per 1,000 in 1990 to 15 in 2004. There is increasing disparity between health in the capital and on the other islands. There is also a problem of malnutrition. Imported food is expensive.

On 24 May 2021, the Maldives experienced the world's fastest-growing COVID-19 outbreak, recording the highest number of infections per million people during the preceding seven- and fourteen-day periods, according to data compiled by Bloomberg. Medical professionals warned that the rising demand for COVID-19 care could affect their capacity to manage other health emergencies in the country.

Preventive and public health falls within the remit of the Health Protection Agency.

The Society for Health Education provides sexual and reproductive health information and services to young people and is supported by the United Nations Population Fund.

== Health indicators ==
The table shows some key health statistics and their trends over recent years.

Indicator	Recent Value Estimates	Trend/Comment
Life expectancy at birth	80.39 in 2025	Increase
Healthy life expectancy (HALE)	66.7 in 2021	Increase
Infant mortality rate	5 deaths per 1,000 live births in 2023	Reduction
Under-five mortality rate	5.7 deaths per 1,000 live births in 2023	Reduction
Neonatal mortality rate	3.9 deaths per 1,000 live births in 2023	Reduction
Maternal mortality rate (MMR)	32 per 100,000 live births in 2023	Reduction
Cause-of-death profile	Non-communicable diseases account for 78% of total deaths. Communicable conditions account for 18%. Injuries and other COVID-19 pandemic outcomes account for the rest.	

== Healthcare ==
The proportion of health expenditure in the national budget increased from 8.7% in 1998 to 10.9% in 2000. Total expenditure on health in 2001 was $98. Maldives has a universal health insurance scheme, Aasandha.

== Health system structure ==
The Maldives operates a four-tier health system.

There are two hospitals in Malé, the Indira Gandhi Memorial Hospital, which is public and the ADK Hospital which is commercial. On all the inhabited atolls there are primary care facilities, and secondary care with beds on the larger islands. The atoll-based hospitals have trouble getting supplies of medicine:

- Haa Alif Atoll Hospital
- Addu Equatorial Hospital
- Kulhudhuffushi Regional Hospital
- Shaviyani Atoll Hospital
- Noonu Atoll Hospital
- Ungoofaaru Regional Hospital
- Baa Atoll Hospital
- Lhaviyani Atoll Hospital
- Alif Alif Atoll Hospital
- Alif Dhaalu Atoll Hospital
- Vaavu Atoll Hospital
- Muli Regional Hospital
- Faafu Atoll Hospital
- Dhaalu Atoll Hospital
- Thaa Atoll Hospital
- Gan Regional Hospital
- Gaaf Alif Atoll Hospital
- Thinadhoo Regional Hospital
- Nyaviyani Atoll Hospital
- Hithadhoo Regional Hospital

In 2000 there was a total of 470 hospital beds, a ratio of one bed for each 577 inhabitants.

== Health system achievements ==
- Healthcare is free for all citizens and is funded by the "Aasandha," a universal health insurance scheme. Over 40% of the national budget is dedicated to the social sector, the highest in South Asia.
- The country has achieved all Millennium Development Goals and mortality-based Sustainable Development Goals ahead of schedule. Maternal mortality dropped from 552 per 100,000 live births in 2000 to 32 per 100,000 in 2023. Child mortality reduced from 39 per 1,000 live births in 2000 to 5.7 per 1,000 live births in 2023.
- The four-tier health system ensures high coverage of essential services. There's a public health facility on every inhabited island, with primary, secondary and tertiary care available. This is supported by private and NGO facilities.

== Health system challenges ==
Despite notable progress in health outcomes, the Maldives faces unique health system challenges that are mostly attributable to its geography, limited resources and population distribution. There are still persistent issues that affect equitable access to resources, workforce capacity, infrastructure and the ability to respond to emergent health needs.

- Geographic and Infrastructure barriers: The dispersed geography of so many islands creates logistical challenges for healthcare delivery. This causes inequitable access, especially for residents of remote and underpopulated islands. Transport limitations, high costs and diseconomies of scale hinder the sustainability of outreach and referral systems.
- Workforce and resource constraints: A chronic shortage of healthcare professionals, particularly in the atolls, limits service availability and quality. Organizational barriers, a lack of training, and high workloads further hinder the adoption of evidence-based practices.
- Mental health service gaps: These services remain underdeveloped despite the growing recognition of their importance. Specialized care is largely concentrated in the capital and is insufficient or even lacking in the atolls. There are significant gaps in preventive and community-based services.

== Burden of disease ==
The Maldives faces a double burden of disease with high incidence rates of non-communicable diseases (NCDs), persistent infectious diseases, alongside unique challenges as a result of its peculiar geography.

- It has a high prevalence of NCD risk factors like tobacco use (23% between 15 and 65 years), physical inactivity (1 in 2 people do not the WHO standard of ≥150 min of moderate activity a week), unhealthy diet, unhealthy body weight (1 in 2 are overweight and 1 in 5 are obese), hypercholesterolemia, and high blood pressure.
- Dengue and chikungunya are of significant public health concern. Dengue is endemic with an average of 1,543 symptomatic cases annually (2011-2016). Chikungunya had 1,736 reported cases in 2019.
- The Maldives has one of the highest burdens of beta-thalassemia, a care-intensive inherited blood disorder. About 16-18% of the population are carriers, an estimated 28 new cases are reported annually, and approximately 900 patients are registered annually.
