= Corruption in the Maldives =

Institutional corruption in the country

Corruption in the Maldives remains a persistent problem. The country was ranked 91st of 182 countries on Transparency International’s Corruption Perception Index in 2025. Key issues include high-level corruption and weak enforcement of anti-corruption measures. Incidences of corruption hinder political, social, and economic development and expose Maldives to peace, safety, and security risks.

== Government corruption ==
The country was under the regime of Maumoon Abdul Gayoom for three decades. His government began in 1978 and ended with his electoral defeat in 2008. While he was noted for developing the country’s tourism industry, his long tenure was marked by allegations of corruption and financial irregularities. Gayoom is credited for introducing and developing the luxury tourism industry in Maldives. This economic model became successful and emerged as one of the country’s main sources of revenue. However, it also became a source of corruption as demonstrated in the case of the allocation of resort leases and island sales. A report by Al Jazeera English in 2016 uncovered a $1.5 billion money laundering scheme, which involved Singaporean and Malaysian businessmen. State officials also participated in the scandal such as a judge, who accepted state funds, and a former vice president, who was convicted for benefitting in the sale of islands and lagoons in Maldives.

Gayoom was also accused of corrupt practices. The most significant of these was reported by Maldives’ national auditor, who cited Gayoom's “out of control” personal spending. This included the $17 million renovation of the national palace, the acquisition of 11 speedboats, 55 cars, and a $9.5 million luxury yacht using government funds.

Several modern corruption scandals and abuse of power involve high-level officials. One of the most notable was the Maldives Marketing and Public Relations Corporation scandal, which was first exposed in an Al Jazeera report, entailing the embezzlement of over $90 million by government officials. The case involved the diversion of MMPRC funds to fund the parliamentary election in 2014. It also included the lease of at least 50 islands of the archipelagic country to private companies without public tender to benefit government officials. High-level officials were involved, including the former Maldivian president Abdulla Yameen, who was Gayoom's half-brother. He was accused of pocketing kickbacks from a private company and for embezzling $1 million from state funds derived from resort development rights. In 2022, a criminal court found guilty and was sentenced to 11 years imprisonment.

In September 2025, a 2,973-page forensic report extracted in 2015 from a mobile phone of former vice president Ahmed Adeeb, a central figure in the MMPRC case, was leaked online by an anonymous X user operating under the name "Jubraan Shareef". Dubbed the Adeeb files, the leak renewed public scrutiny of the MMPRC scandal and of unresolved corruption allegations against figures across the political spectrum.

== Impact ==
Corruption has exacerbated existing inequalities in Maldives, particularly affecting vulnerable groups. It diminishes the capability of the state to provide essential services due to misappropriated government funds. This was demonstrated during the COVID-19 pandemic. The tourism industry, which is the country's main source of revenue, took a hit and the government scrambled to address the pandemic through emergency procurement. The weakened economy reduced Maldives' capacity to respond to the public health crisis. There was a failure to provide essential services, disproportionately affecting migrant workers, which constitutes a third of Maldives’ population. Also, around 91,000 children had no formal learning as schools were closed down. The problem was further aggravated by allegations of corruption due to the lack of transparency in healthcare procurement. For instance, it was reported in a government audit that the Ministry of Health's procurement of ventilators had significant irregularities.

Maldives is also unable to address security issues and is forced to capitulate to the demands of Islamist extremist groups. These include the state's crackdown on activists and civil society organizations, a move that the extremists had demanded since they allegedly insulted Islam.

== Anti-corruption measures ==
Maldives has attempted to institute reforms addressing corruption. During the administration of President Ibrahim Mohamed Solih, who took office in 2018, the government made significant commitments to reform. Key anti-corruption initiatives included the Whistleblower Protection Act, which entailed legislation aimed at enhancing transparency and accountability. Solih also created the so-called Grand Corruption Investigation led by a committee tasked to investigate cases of grand corruption and money laundering. However, these reforms have so far failed to address corruption, which became deeply entrenched in the government, police, and the courts.

In Transparency International's 2025 Corruption Perceptions Index, which scored 182 countries on a scale from 0 ("highly corrupt") to 100 ("very clean"), Maldives scored 39. When ranked by score, Maldives ranked 91st among the 182 countries in the Index, where the country ranked first is perceived to have the most honest public sector. For comparison with regional scores, the best score among those countries of the Asia Pacific region that appeared in the Index (Note: Afghanistan, Australia, Bangladesh, Bhutan, Brunei Darussalam, Cambodia, China, Fiji, Hong Kong, India, Indonesia, Japan, North Korea, South Korea, Laos, Malaysia, Maldives, Mongolia, Myanmar, Nepal, New Zealand, Pakistan, Papua New Guinea, Philippines, Singapore, Solomon Islands, Sri Lanka, Taiwan, Thailand, Timor-Leste, Vanuatu, Vietnam) was 84, the average score was 45 and the worst score was 15. For comparison with worldwide scores, the best score was 89 (ranked 1), the average score was 42, and the worst score was 9 (ranked 181, in a two-way tie).

== See also ==
- Maldives Marketing and Public Relations Corporation scandal
- Adeeb files
