= Presidential Commission on Deaths and Disappearances =

Maldivian commission (2018–2024)

- Native name: މަރާލާފައިވާ މީހުންނާއި ގެއްލުވާލާފައިވާ މީހުންގެ މައްސަލަތައް ތަޙުޤީޤުކުރާ ކޮމިޝަން
- Founded: 17 November 2018 in Malé, Maldives
- Founder: Ibrahim Mohamed Solih
- Defunct: 2 June 2024
- Key people: Husnu Al Suood (Chairperson); Ahmed Nashid (member); Adam Ibrahim (member); Fareesha Abdulla (member); Misbaah Abbas (member)
- Members: 4

The Presidential Commission on Deaths and Disappearances (Dhivehi: މަރާލާފައިވާ މީހުންނާއި ގެއްލުވާލާފައިވާ މީހުންގެ މައްސަލަތައް ތަޙުޤީޤުކުރާ ކޮމިޝަން; DDCom), officially known as Commission on Investigation of Murders and Enforced Disappearances is a Maldivian presidential commission formed by president Ibrahim Mohamed Solih on 17 November 2018, on the day of his inauguration.

Within 4 days after its creation, the commission officially commenced operations on 21 November 2018. The comomission was tasked to investigate unresolved cases of murders and enforced disappearances from 1 January 2012 to 17 November 2018. The commission investigated 27 cases such as the disappaearance and murder of Ahmed Rilwan Abdulla, murder of Yameen Rasheed, Afrasheem Ali, and Raudha Athif.

== Investigations and reports ==
In total, the commission investigated 27 cases, with some international help from the FBI and the Western Australia Police Force. Some of the cases DDCom investigated have lacked investigation and have alleged corruption in the investigation, which made the general public and the families of the victims believe that the real perpretrators are free.

DDCom later in November 2019 finished its report on the murder of Afrasheem Ali and Raudha Athif, they forwarded the report to president Solih, the Maldives Police Service, and more. Later on, they released the Afrasheem's report to the public.

Ahmed Rilwan's murder report was finished in 2022 and confirmed Rilwan was killed and the suspects fled to Syria to join the Syrian civil war.

An achievement made by this commission was the implementation of a witness protection program.

== Dissolution ==
Although DDCom was supposed to be dissolved in May 2024, it was extended at the request of the victim's families by president Mohamed Muizzu. DDCom was officially dissolved by Muizzu in June 2024.

== Controversies ==
DDCom has been under many controversies surrounding its lack of transparency and corruption within the investigations of cases.

DDCom has claimed that the President's office ordered the commission to only share the findings with the office and not to the general public, which caused public backlash. Many civil society organizations such as the Maldives Journalists Association, Human Rights Watch, Asian Forum for Human Rights and Development, International Federation of Journalists and more called on DDCom to publicly disclose the findings.

== Members ==
These are the members of DDCom:

- Husnu Al Suood - Chairperson
- Ahmed Nashid
- Adam Ibrahim
- Fareesha Abdulla
- Misbaah Abbas

=== Former members ===
- Abdulla Munaz
