= Stealing Paradise =

2016 documentary film

- Youtube thumbnail
- Created by: Al Jazeera Investigations
- Narrated by: Will Jordan
- Original language: English

Production
- Production locations: Maldives, United Kingdom, Singapore
- Editor: Adrian Billing
- Running time: 48:35
- Production company: Al Jazeera Media Network

Original release
- Network: Al Jazeera English
- Release: 7 September 2016

Stealing Paradise is a 2016 Qatari English-language investigative documentary which exposed high-level corruption which involved former President of the Maldives Abdulla Yameen and former Vice President of the Maldives Ahmed Adeeb, produced by Al Jazeera's Investigation Unit and released on Al Jazeera English.

== Description ==
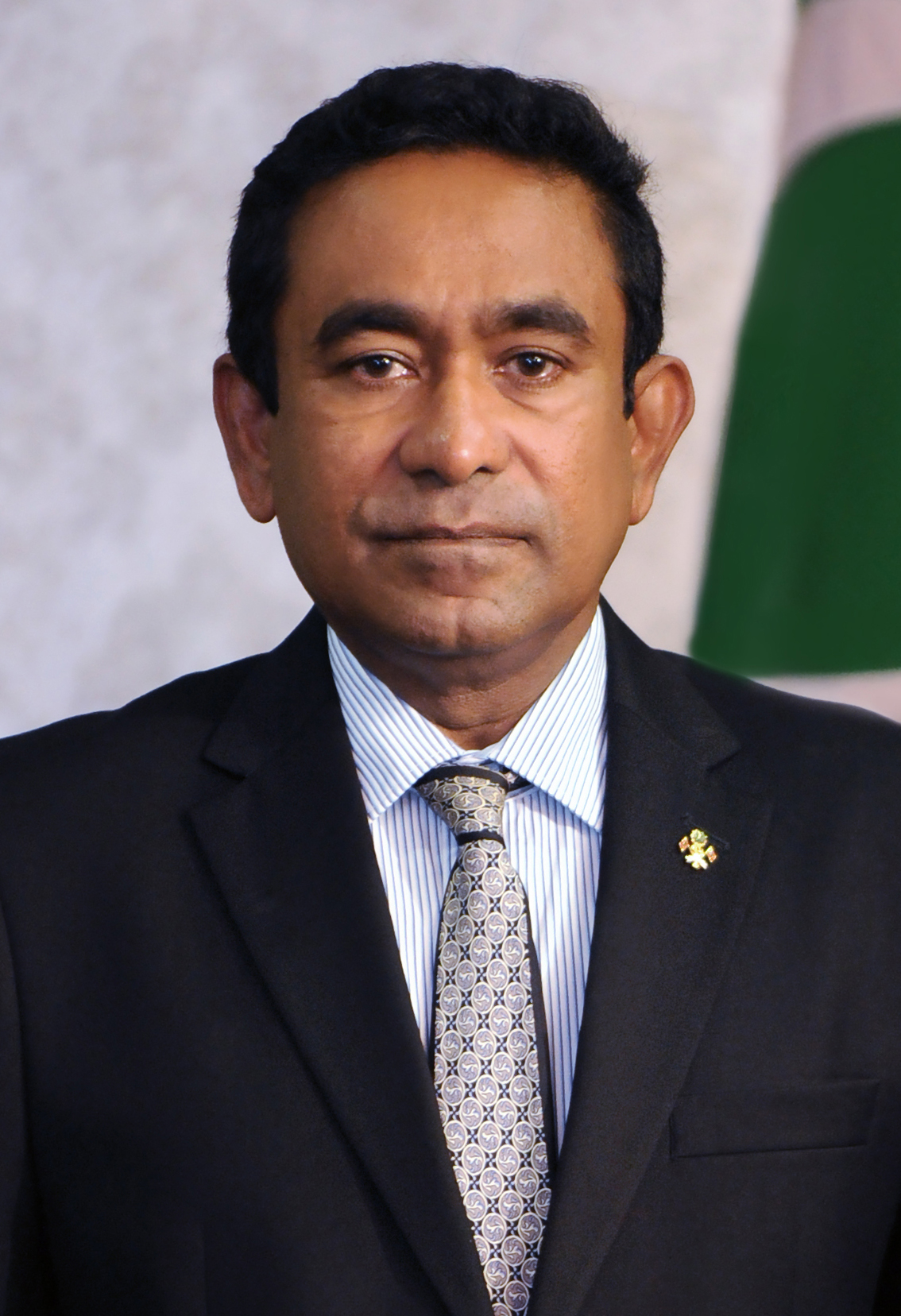
Abdulla Yameen

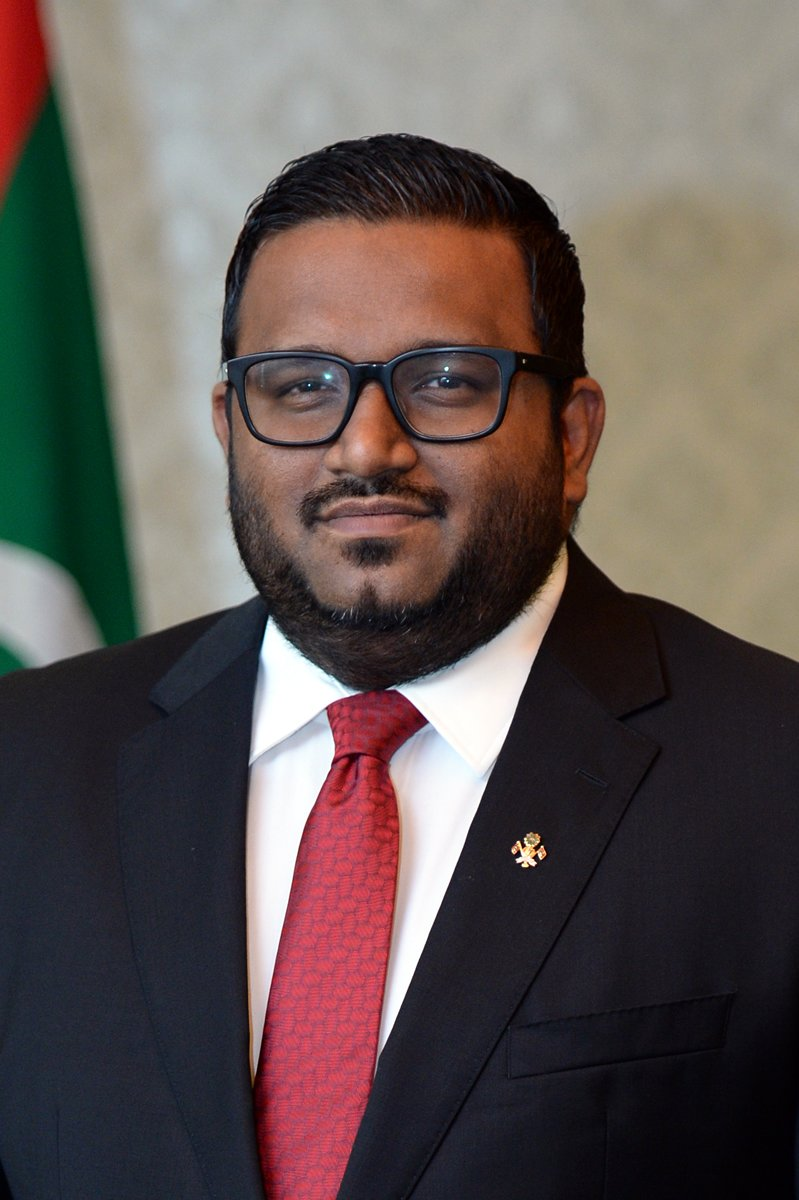
Ahmed Adeeb

The documentary revealed how millions of state funds were embezzled and laundered. This money was used to bribe judges, politicians, and police officials. It also revealed Yameen's alleged involvement in the torching of Raajje TV, and impeded the investigation into the disappearance of Ahmed Rilwan.

== Maldivian government response ==
The government dismissed the documentary as 'defamatory and biased', and how the documentary didn't substantiate the allegations against Yameen. The government also issued a warning over the documentary, and has introduced strict defamation laws. The Progressive Party of Maldives (PPM), which is the ruling party, had threatened to sue Al Jazeera over the expose.

Yameen later apologized to the people after an official audit report had revealed that $79m dollars was embezzled, which was criticized by his former deputy Mohamed Jameel Ahmed.

In 2017, president Yameen later admitted that unlawful money obtained by Adeeb entered his residence. PPM later backtracked and said that Yameen's speech was misinterpreted.

== Award ==
The documentary won the Corruption Reporting Award at the One World Media ceremony. Accepting the award, Will Jordan dedicated the award to Yameen Rasheed, who was murdered in front of his house.

== Reception ==
After the documentary was published, Transparency Maldives called for an independent investigation into President Yameen about the concerns raised by Al Jazeera.

The Anti-Corruption Commission launched an inquiry to verify the information in the corruption exposé.

Maldives Police Service raided Maldives Independent's headquarters over an 'alleged coup plot', hours after the documentary was released. Which ended empty handed.

== See also ==
- Maldives Marketing and Public Relations Corporation scandal
