= Adeeb files =

Leaked forensic report related to Ahmed Adeeb and his affiliates

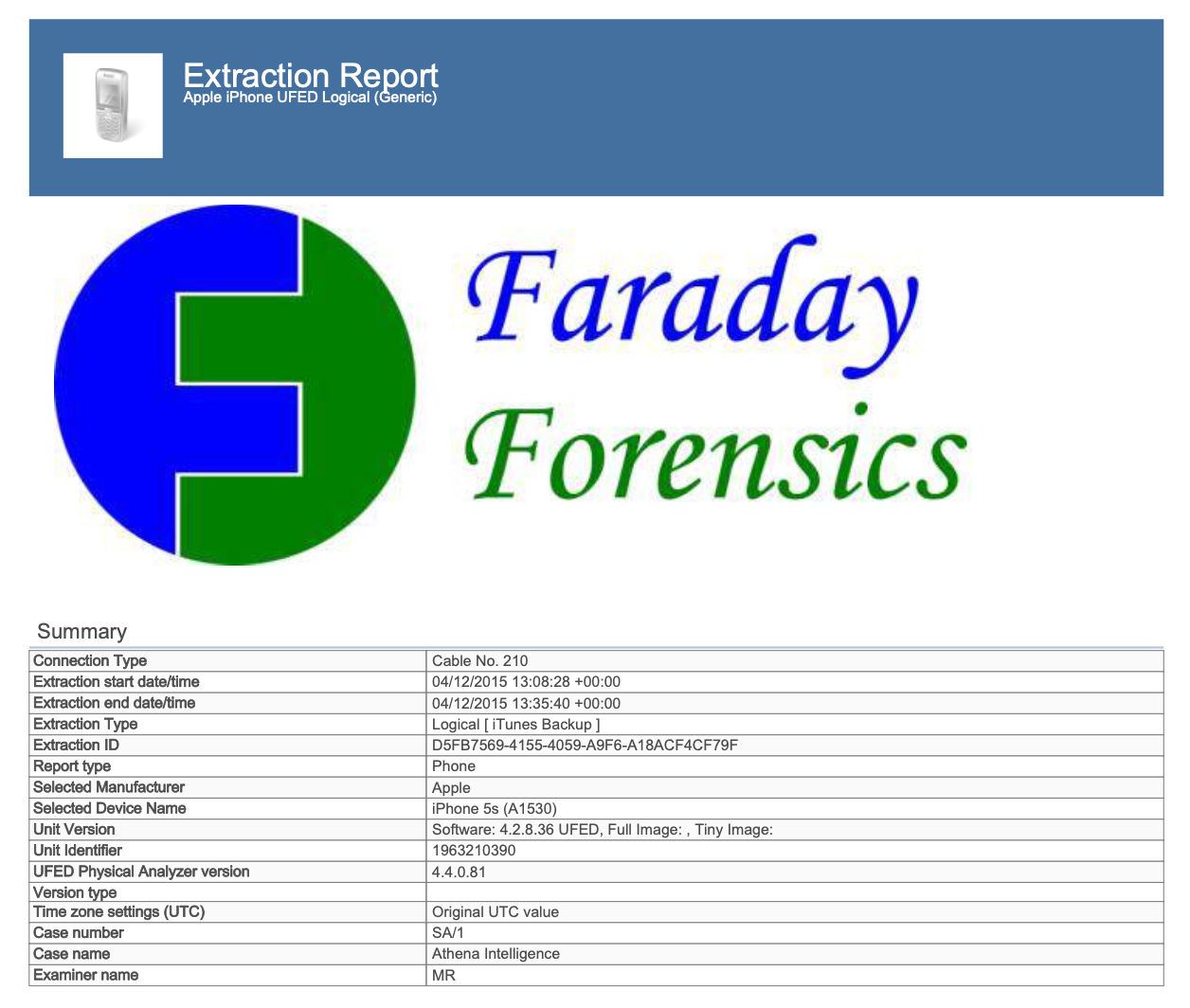
First page of the forensic extraction report associated with the Adeeb Files

Adeeb files refers to a leaked forensic report and associated digital records extracted from a mobile phone of former Maldivian vice president Ahmed Adeeb. The material was reportedly leaked online in September 2025 under the hashtag #AdeebFiles by an anonymous X user operating under the name "Jubraan Shareef". Media reports described the leak as a 2,973-page report compiled by the UK-based digital forensics firm Faraday Forensics in 2015, containing chat logs, contact lists, calendar entries and other records from Adeeb's phone.

The leak attracted attention in the Maldives because of Adeeb's central role in the Maldives Marketing and Public Relations Corporation scandal, one of the country's largest corruption cases, and because material from Adeeb's phones had previously been used in Al Jazeera's 2016 investigation Stealing Paradise.

== Background ==
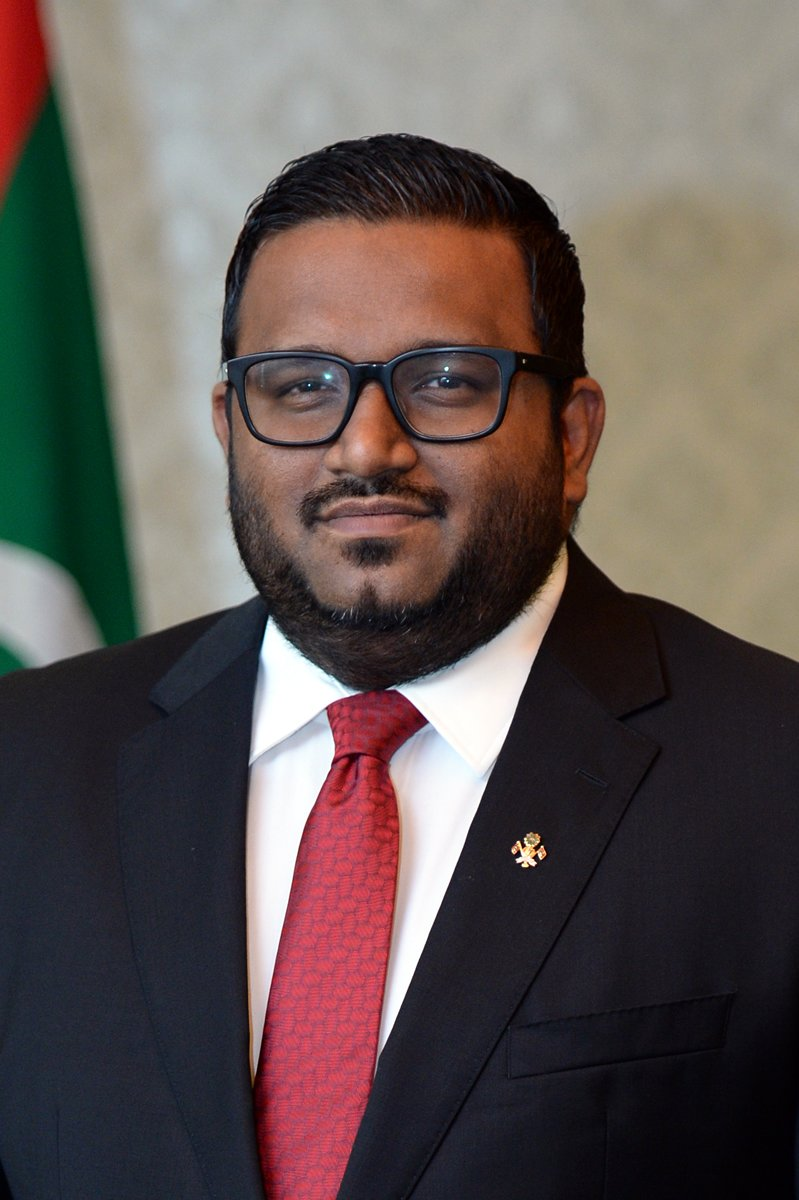
Ahmed Adeeb in 2015

Ahmed Adeeb served as tourism minister and later as vice president of the Maldives during the administration of president Abdulla Yameen. He became a central figure in investigations into the Maldives Marketing and Public Relations Corporation scandal, which involved the embezzlement of public money connected to the lease of islands and lagoons for tourism development.

In October 2020, Adeeb was sentenced to 20 years in prison after pleading guilty to charges related to corruption and money laundering in the MMPRC case. In November 2023, outgoing president Ibrahim Mohamed Solih granted clemency to Adeeb and former MMPRC managing director Abdulla Ziyath, a move criticised by Transparency Maldives and other anti-corruption advocates.

Before the 2025 leak, records from Adeeb's phones had already been used in Al Jazeera's 2016 documentary Stealing Paradise, which investigated allegations of corruption and abuse of power during the Yameen administration. Al Jazeera reported in 2016 that the material included photographs, emails and text messages from Adeeb's phones.

== Leak ==
In September 2025, a social media account using the name "Jubraan Shareef" published what media outlets described as a 2,973-page forensic report based on data extracted from one of Adeeb's iPhones. According to Atoll Times, the data had been extracted in 2015 by Faraday Forensics and included 81,167 messages involving Adeeb and other parties. Sun reported that the material contained chat logs, contacts, calendar entries and photos, and that it was circulated widely on X, formerly Twitter.

The anonymous leaker told Maldives Independent that the report was not the full raw dataset and that some images had been removed before publication. The leaker also called for wider disclosure of evidence connected to the MMPRC scandal, arguing that the public had a right to know about unresolved corruption allegations.

== Contents and reporting ==
News organisations described the Adeeb Files as containing communications between Adeeb and politicians, officials, judges, police officers, business figures and other public figures. Maldives Independent reported that the files included material that had not previously been made public and connected the leaked report to earlier reporting on the MMPRC scandal and the so-called "Bro Economy" surrounding Adeeb.

In October 2025, Maldives Independent began publishing a series based on the leaked material. The first article in the series focused on Adeeb's associates and alleged cash movements linked to the MMPRC scandal. A second article reported on alleged requests for money, jobs and favours by members of the 18th People's Majlis and other public figures.

Because the files contain private communications and allegations involving living persons, media coverage of the leak has raised issues of verification, privacy and defamation. The leaked material has not itself been treated as conclusive proof of wrongdoing unless supported by court findings, official investigations or independent reporting.

== Authenticity and redactions ==
Media reports described the leaked material as a forensic report prepared by Faraday Forensics in 2015. However, the completeness of the published leak was disputed soon after its release. Former home minister Umar Naseer claimed that the circulated version was heavily redacted and that additional chat logs existed. The anonymous leaker also told Maldives Independent that the public version was not the full raw document and that images had been removed.

As of May 2026, there had been no publicly reported comprehensive official authentication of the entire leaked dataset. News coverage has therefore generally attributed claims about the contents of the files to the leaked report, the anonymous leaker, or journalists who reviewed the material. No public statement from Faraday Forensics confirming the authenticity of the leaked version was cited in the available reporting, and questions regarding the provenance and completeness of the published material remained the subject of public discussion.

== Political reaction and impact ==
The leak renewed public discussion about the MMPRC scandal, political accountability and unresolved corruption allegations in the Maldives. Maldives Independent and other outlets linked the leak to longstanding criticism that successive governments had failed to fully investigate or prosecute all individuals implicated in the MMPRC case.

Sun reported that Umar Naseer argued the leaked version was incomplete and claimed that a fuller release would implicate senior figures in the opposition Maldivian Democratic Party. Commentary published by Maldives Independent argued that the leak placed pressure on both the governing People's National Congress and the opposition Maldivian Democratic Party because individuals from across the political class were allegedly mentioned in the files.

== Legal and privacy issues ==
The Adeeb Files contain material described as private communications from a mobile phone, including messages involving living persons. For that reason, coverage of the files has been subject to concerns about privacy, selective disclosure, political misuse and the risk of publishing unverified allegations. The anonymous leaker told Maldives Independent that some images were removed before publication because of their private nature.

== See also ==
- Ahmed Adeeb
- Maldives Marketing and Public Relations Corporation scandal
- Abdulla Yameen
- Stealing Paradise
