= Alau Ali =

Maldivian businessman

Maldives Stock Exchange

Personal details
- Profession: Chairman of Maldives Stock Exchange

Alau Ali (Dhivehi: އަލާއު އަލީ) is a Maldivian businessman, the current Chairman of the Maldives Stock Exchange, and Vice President and one of the founding members of Maldives Association of Construction Industries (MACI).

Mr. Alau Ali is the managing director of Alia Investments, and is credited for his scope on enhancing and sustaining one of the most respected brands in Maldives, "Alia" and for his philanthropy.
