= Raudha Athif =

Maldivian model (1996–2017)

- Born: 18 May 1996; Maldives
- Died: 29 March 2017 (aged 20); Rajshahi Islami Bank Medical College, Rajshahi, Bangladesh
- Cause of death: controversial suicide by hanging
- Education: Hiriya School
- Occupation: Medical student
- Known for: Vogue model
- Height: 1.65 m (5 ft 5 in)

Raudha Athif (18 May 1996 – 29 March 2017) was a Maldivian Vogue model and medical student, who died in Rajshahi, Bangladesh.

== Biography ==
Athif was educated at Hiriya School and Villa International High School in the Maldives. After her graduation she received a scholarship from the Maldivian Department of Higher Education, and subsequently moved to Rajshahi in Bangladesh, to study medicine at Islami Bank Medical College.

At the age of 14, she participated in an environmental awareness campaign broadcast on Maldivian National Television. She gained wider public attention following a photoshoot in 2014 with Maldivian photographer Sotti and artist Alexey Vladimir, which went viral on social media due to her "exotic" appearance, particularly her striking blue eyes. The image was popularly referred to as the “Maldivian Girl with Aqua Blue Eyes”. In October 2016, she was featured on the cover of Vogue India.

== Death and controversy ==
Athif was found dead by her best friend and roommate, Sirat Parvin, in her dormitory room at Islami Bank Medical College on 29 March 2017. A post-mortem examination was conducted at Rajshahi Medical College Hospital; the procedure reportedly began before consent was given by her father. An autopsy conducted by three doctors concluded that her death was a suicide by hanging. The case was investigated by the Rajshahi Metropolitan Police, with assistance from a team from the Maldives Police Service. Athif was buried at Hetemkha Graveyard in Rajshahi. Her funeral was attended by family members and the Maldivian Ambassador to Bangladesh, Aishath Shan Shakir.

Athif’s father, Mohamed Athif, also a medical doctor, disputed the conclusion that her death was a suicide. Her family alleged that she had been killed, suggesting she was possibly targeted by an Islamic extremist for "refusing to wear Islamic clothing". On 10 April 2017, her father filed a case against Sirat Parvin, the Kashmiri student who had found Athif's body. On 24 April 2017, her body was exhumed by the Criminal Investigation Department (CID), which carried out a second autopsy. The CID later stated that its investigation also concluded that Athif had died by suicide.

The case was subsequently investigated by the Australian television programme 60 Minutes, in which multiple criminal experts suggested the possibility of foul play. The journalists involved later reported that they were instructed to stop filming and leave the country.
