= List of hospitals in the Maldives =

List of hospitals

List of hospitals in the Maldives include the following:

- ADK Hospital
- Faafu Atoll Hospital
- Gan Regional Hospital
- Indira Gandhi Memorial Hospital
- Ihavandhoo Health Centre
- Addu Equatorial Hospital
- Dhaalu Atoll Hospital
- Faafu Atoll Hospital
