= Capital Market Development Authority =

Market regulatory authority

- ކެޕިޓަލް މާކެޓް ޑިވެލޮޕްމަންޓް އޮތޯރިޓީ
- Abbreviation: CMDA
- Formation: January 29, 2009; 17 years ago
- Founded at: Maldives
- Purpose: Regulating and supervising the MSE, MPAO and MRPS
- Headquarters: 5th Floor, Ma. Uthuruvehi, Kenery Magu,
- Location: Malé, Maldives
- Board of directors: Aishath Zahira, Mohamed Hussain Maniku, Mariyam Visam, Aishath Nadhiya, Mohamed Haleem Abdulla, Mariyam Shahida, Mohamed Fizan
- Key people: Mohamed Hussain Maniku (CEO); Aishath Zahira (Chairperson)
- Website: https://cmda.gov.mv/en/

The Capital Market Development Authority (CMDA) is the state entity responsible for the development and regulation of the securities market, and the capital market of Maldives. CMDA was established as an independent institution in 2006 with the passing of the Maldives Securities Act 2006. Prior to that, it was functioning as a separate Division of the Maldives Monetary Authority (MMA).

CMDA regulates and supervises the Maldives Stock Exchange (MSE), Maldives Pension Administration Office (MPAO), Maldives Retirement Pension Scheme (MRPS), and also grants licenses to Stock Brokers or Dealing Companies, Investment Advisors, Rating Agencies, and Investment or Mutual Funds. While CMDA is the equivalent of the Securities and Exchange Commission in other countries, it has a dual role of further developing the capital market of the country, and protecting the interests of the investors through its regulations.

CMDA is governed by a board of directors, and daily operations are managed by the chief executive officer (CEO). The current CEO, Mohamed Hussain Maniku was appointed in January 2021. The board members are appointed as per Securities Act, and are represented by MMA, Ministry of Finance, Registrar of Companies, and the private sector. The President appoints all board members and the chairman.

== See also ==
- List of financial supervisory authorities by country
