= Islami Bank Medical College =

Private medical college in Rajshahi, Bangladesh

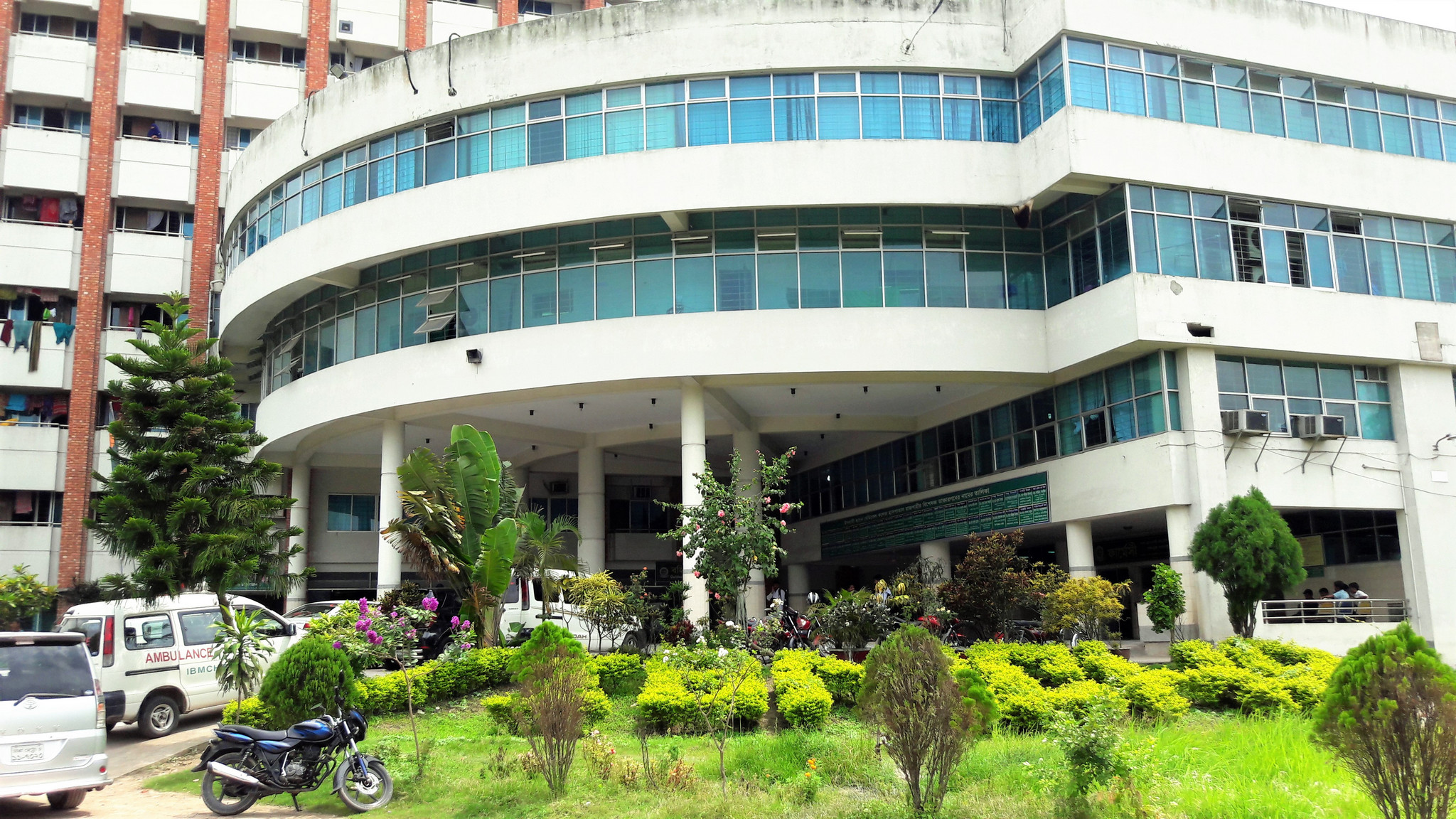
Islami Bank Medical College & Hospital

Islami Bank Medical College is a private Medical College located in Rajshahi, Bangladesh.

== History ==
Islami Bank Medical College was established on 2003 in Rajshahi by Islamic bank Bangladesh. Islamic Bank is connected with the Jamaat-e-Islami Bangladesh political party. The college has a hospital attached to it. Raudha Athif, a Maldivian model, was a student in the college was found dead inside the dormitory of the college on 29 March 2017.
