= Faafu Atoll Hospital =

Geography
- Location: Nilandhoo, Maldives
- Coordinates: 3.05604°N 72.8896°E

Organisation
- Care system: General
- Type: Atoll Hospital

History
- Founded: 16 December 2006

Links
- Website: https://www.fah.gov.mv/ Faafu Atoll Hospital
- Lists: Hospitals in Maldives

Faafu Atoll Hospital is located in the island of Nilandhoo in Faafu Atoll, Maldives. It is part of the Atoll Hospital health authority.

== History ==
Faafu Atoll Hospital was initially established as Faafu Nilandhoo Health Centre on 30 April 1996 and was upgraded to hospital on 16 December 2006 as the atoll hospital for Faafu Atoll. Laboratory services began at the hospital on 7 April 2002, and X-ray service on 26 March 2007.
