= Raajje TV =

Coordinates: 4.1716°N 73.5104°E

- Logo since 2013
- Country: Maldives
- Broadcast area: Maldives, South Asia
- Headquarters: Malé, Maldives

Programming
- Languages: Dhivehi; English
- Picture format: 480i SD; 720i HD; 1080i Full HD; 2160i 4K UHD

History
- Launched: 5 June 2008
- Former names: Malé TV

Links
- Website: raajje.mv

Availability

Terrestrial
- Medianet: 105
- SSNET: 6

Raajje TV is a television channel based in the Maldives, known for its news coverage, entertainment programs, and cultural content. The channel started broadcasting on 5 June 2008 as Future TV, adopting its current name in 2011.

== Arson Attack on Raajje TV ==
On 7 October 2013, the channel's television station in Queen of the Night building in Malé was targeted in an arson attack. The perpetrators reportedly used petrol bombs to set fire to the station's studios, causing significant damage to the building and equipment. There were no casualties reported.

The attack was widely condemned by local and international organisations as an assault on press freedom. Raajje TV, known for its critical coverage of the Maldivian government, had previously faced threats and intimidation due to its journalism. The attack sparked concerns about the safety of journalists and the state of media freedom in the Maldives. It was revealed in Al Jazeera's documentary Stealing Paradise that Ahmed Adeeb was involved in the attack.

== Raajje TV Ban ==
During the 2018 Maldives political crisis, the Maldivian government accused Raajje TV of violating broadcasting regulations and ordered the station to cease operations following the declaration of a state of emergency by then-President Abdulla Yameen. Despite facing government pressure, Raajje TV has continued to operate.

Following the 2018 Maldivian presidential election, the new administration under Ibrahim Mohamed Solih pledged to uphold media freedom and restore democratic institutions. As a result, Raajje TV was able to resume its operations and continue its role as an independent news outlet in the Maldives.
