= Rashida Yoosuf =

Maldivian politician and diplomat

- ރާޝިދާ ޔޫސުފް
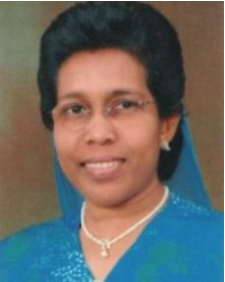
- Yoosuf in 1989

High Commissioner of the Maldives to Sri Lanka
- In office 9 October 2002 – 2004
- President: Maumoon Abdul Gayoom
- Preceded by: Abdul Azeez Yoosuf
- Succeeded by: Mohamed Asim

Minister of Women’s and Social Security
- In office 11 November 1998 – 9 October 2002
- President: Maumoon Abdul Gayoom
- Preceded by: Herself
- Succeeded by: Aneesa Ahmed

Minister of Women’s Affairs and Social Welfare
- In office 6 November 1996 – 11 November 1998
- President: Maumoon Abdul Gayoom
- Preceded by: Herself
- Succeeded by: Herself

Minister of Youth Women’s Affairs and Sports
- In office 11 November 1993 – 6 November 1996
- President: Maumoon Abdul Gayoom
- Succeeded by: Herself

Personal details
- Party: Progressive Party of Maldives
- Spouse: Umar (deceased)
- Children: 1
- Education: University of Manchester

Rashida Yoosuf (Dhivehi: ރާޝިދާ ޔޫސުފް) is a Maldivian politician and diplomat.

== Early life and education ==
Yoosuf moved to Malé when she was 6 years old and studied in Madhrasathul Saniyya, till grade 10. She got a government scholarship to study in India for teacher training. She received an opportunity to go to the Philippines for a teacher education course. She also got an opportunity to do a school management course in Australia, as well a scholarship from the Maldivian government as to do her master's degree at University of Manchester in the United Kingdom, where she completed the latter in 1988. She received an award by then–president Maumoon Abdul Gayoom in 1989.

== Early career ==
Yoosuf started working as a teacher in Majeediyya School. After completing the teacher education course, she worked at the Educational Development Centre for 4 years before becoming a Supervisor at Majeediyya School. She was also the principal of Thaajuddeen School.

== Career ==
Yoosuf first served as the Minister of Youth Women’s Affairs and Sports from 11 November 1993 to 6 November 1996, before the ministry underwent changes and was thus renamed to the Ministry of Women’s Affairs and Social Welfare, where she was the minister from 6 November 1996 to 11 November 1998, the ministry again was renamed to the Ministry of Women’s and Social Security, where she was the minister from 11 November 1998 to 9 October 2002.

During her time as Minister, she attempted to open up discussion in the Maldives on the subject of domestic violence, but was unsuccessful. She also brought up to the Committee on Rights of the Child on how Maldives' resources on welfare and resources to the development of children were stretched.

In 2002, she was appointed High Commissioner of the Maldives to Sri Lanka, becoming the first woman to reach such a high rank in the Maldivian diplomatic corps. She was the High Commissioner for 2 years.

Yoosuf was reappointed to the Cabinet in 2008 by Maumoon Abdul Gayoom, which caused controversy which some described as nepotism. In 2008, she received an award from the Maldivian government for her work in the field of women's issues over the previous quarter-century.

In 2010, Yoosuf and Aneesa Ahmed founded "Hope for Women", a non-governmental organization that aims to eliminate violence against women.

She was a member of the Progressive Party of Maldives.

== Personal life ==
Yoosuf married Lucas Onyango, a Kenyan national. After Lucas converted to Islam, he changed his name to Umar. Umar worked as a teacher in Aminiya School, before his death. Yoosuf and Umar had one child named Amani.
