= Hiriya School =

Primary and secondary school in Malé

Location
- Hiriya School, Kan'baa Aisarani Hin'gun, Malé, Maldives
- Coordinates: 4.174517°N 73.502370°E

Information
- Type: Primary School and Secondary School
- Motto: Excel and Exemplify
- Religious affiliation(s): Islam
- Established: 15 September 2009
- Founder: Mohamed Nasheed
- Status: Active
- Administrator: Ibrahim Shiyam
- Principal: Aminath Naeema
- Deputy Principals: Dhiyana Ahmed Didi
- Employees: 164
- Gender: Male and Female
- Hours in school day: 6
- Houses: Han'dhuvaree, Husnuheena, Karanka, Malikuruva
- Website: hiriya.edu.mv
- Last updated: 24 April 2025

Hiriya School is a school located in Malé, Maldives, next to Thaajuddeen School. It was officially opened on 15 September 2009 by former president, Mohamed Nasheed. The school teaches for the Cambridge IGCSE Examinations. It participates in inter-school competitions and has had students in the Top 10 Students of the country.

== History ==
Hiriya School was built under the Japanese government assistance. It was opened as a secondary girls' school, but now is currently co-educational catering students from grades 1-10 in 2 sessions.

In 2018, Kazumi Endo, Ambassador of Japan to the Republic of Maldives gave 92 books to Hiriya School's principal, Ms. Rinzy Ibrahim Waheed, at a ceremony at the school. The books were donated by the Nippon Foundation as part of the "Read Japan" initiative.

The school was also used as a temporary shelter due to the COVID-19 pandemic for those who were stranded during COVID-19 lockdowns, it was the first of many schools to be used as temporary shelters. The then Male' City Council Shifa Mohamed announced that it was being done with the cooperation with the Education Ministry and the Gender Ministry reported that over 100 individuals were saved.

=== Previous Principals ===
- Ali Nazim (2009–2011) (Note: Drowned while trying to save students in field trip in Huraa in 2011.)
- Ismail Masroof (2012–2016)
- Rinzy Ibrahim Waheed (2016–2025)
- Aminath Naeema (2025–present)

== Uniform Bodies ==
There's 5 uniform bodies in Hiriya such as, Girl Guides, Cadet, Cub Scout, Scouts, Band.

== Facilities ==
- School Compound
- Library
- Meeting Room
- Computer Laboratory
- Audio Visual Room
- Science Laboratory
- Staff Room

== Clubs ==
- Rainbow Club
- HUM Club
- Adhabee Hiyaa
- SECHO Club
- Coding Club
- Siraath Club
- Environment Club
- Home Science Club
- Art Club
