= Aneesa Ahmed =

Maldivian politician and women's rights activist

- އަނީސާ އަހްމަދު
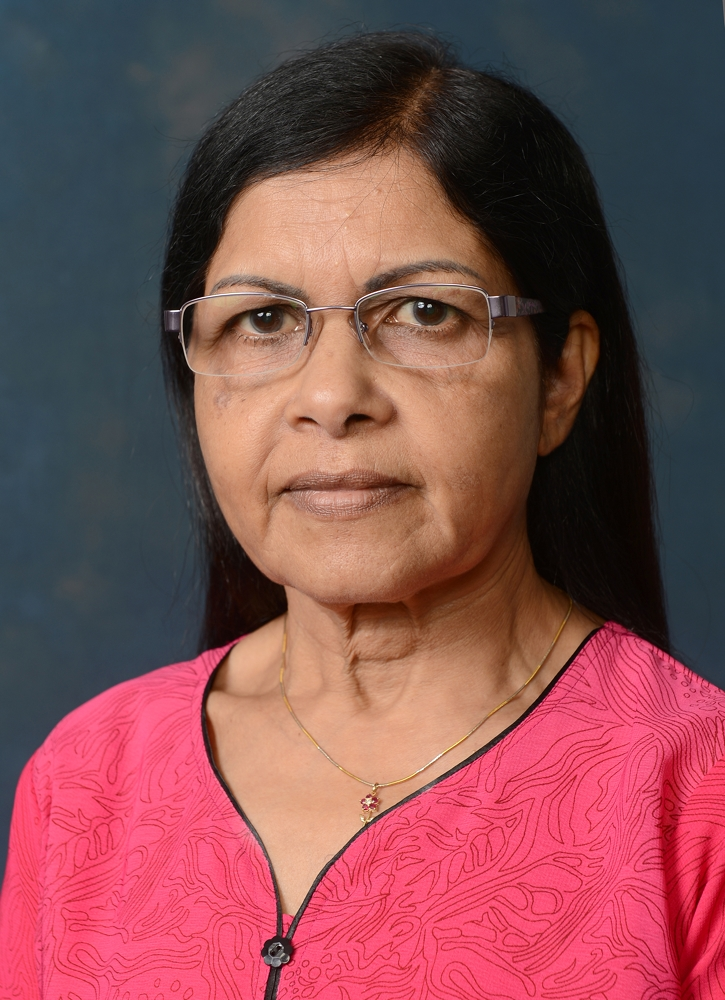
- Ahmed in 2013

Deputy Speaker of the People's Majlis
- In office 2008–2009
- President: Maumoon Abdul Gayoom; Mohamed Nasheed

Minister of Gender, Family Development and Social Security
- In office 11 November 2003 – 13 September 2004
- President: Maumoon Abdul Gayoom
- Preceded by: Herself
- Succeeded by: Aishath Mohamed Didi

Minister of Women’s and Social Security
- In office 9 October 2002 – 11 November 2003
- President: Maumoon Abdul Gayoom
- Preceded by: Rashida Yoosuf
- Succeeded by: Herself

Personal details
- Party: Dhivehi Rayyithunge Party (until 2011); Progressive Party of Maldives
- Education: Pennsylvania State University

Aneesa Ahmed, NIIV (Dhivehi: އަނީސާ އަހްމަދު) is a Maldivian politician and women's rights activist who served as the Deputy Speaker of People's Majlis from 2004 to 2009.

== Education ==
Ahmed was one of the first people to do the Cambridge O-Level's in the Maldives. She studied as a Humphrey Fellow at Pennsylvania State University from 1985 to 1986.

== Career ==
=== Early career ===
Ahmed started working as a sister at the government hospital on 7 June 1973. She later started to work in the foreign industry as a lawyer for the Ministry of External Affairs. She then worked at the President's Office for seventeen years in the foreign relations section, becoming the first Maldivian woman to participate in the United Nations General Assembly.

=== Political career ===
She was also appointed as the Minister of Women’s and Social Security from 2002 until 2003 where she was appointed as the Minister of Gender, Family Development and Social Security. She also served as the Minister of Health and a Minister at the President's Office.

In 1997, she was appointed as the President's Member of the People's Majlis. Later in 1999, she was appointed as the Member of the People's Majlis for Mulaku Atoll. In 2005, she was appointed as the Chief Whip for the Dhivehi Rayyithunge Party's parliamentary group. In 2008, she was elected as the Deputy Speaker of the People's Majlis. During her time as a member of the People's Majlis, she introduced bills and advocated for women's development and needs.

In 2011, she joined the Progressive Party of Maldives.

=== Activism ===
While serving as the Deputy Minister of Women's Affairs in Maldives, where she brought up the subject of domestic violence although it was taboo to do so. After her service in government, she founded the non-governmental organization "Hope for Women" and led sessions about gender-based violence with police, students, and others. When the national radio of the Maldives began to feature religious scholars who claimed female genital mutilation was supported by Islam, she asked the government to intervene, and talked publicly about the harm caused by female genital mutilation.

She received a 2012 International Women of Courage Award. She was the second Maldivian woman to receive an International Women of Courage Award.

She also served as the President of the Family Protection Authority's board.

On 26 July 2013, Aneesa received the Order of Izzuddin by President Mohamed Waheed Hassan.
