= Gan Regional Hospital =

- Atoll Hospital Authority

Geography
- Location: Gan in Laamu Atoll, Maldives
- Coordinates: 1.921598°N 73.544551°E

Links
- Website: www.grh.gov.mv
- Lists: Hospitals in Maldives

Gan Regional Hospital is located on the island of Gan in Laamu Atoll, Maldives. It is part of the Atoll Hospital health authority.
