= Thaajuddeen School =

Government School in Male', Maldives

Thaajuddeen School ތާޖުއްދީން ސްކޫލް
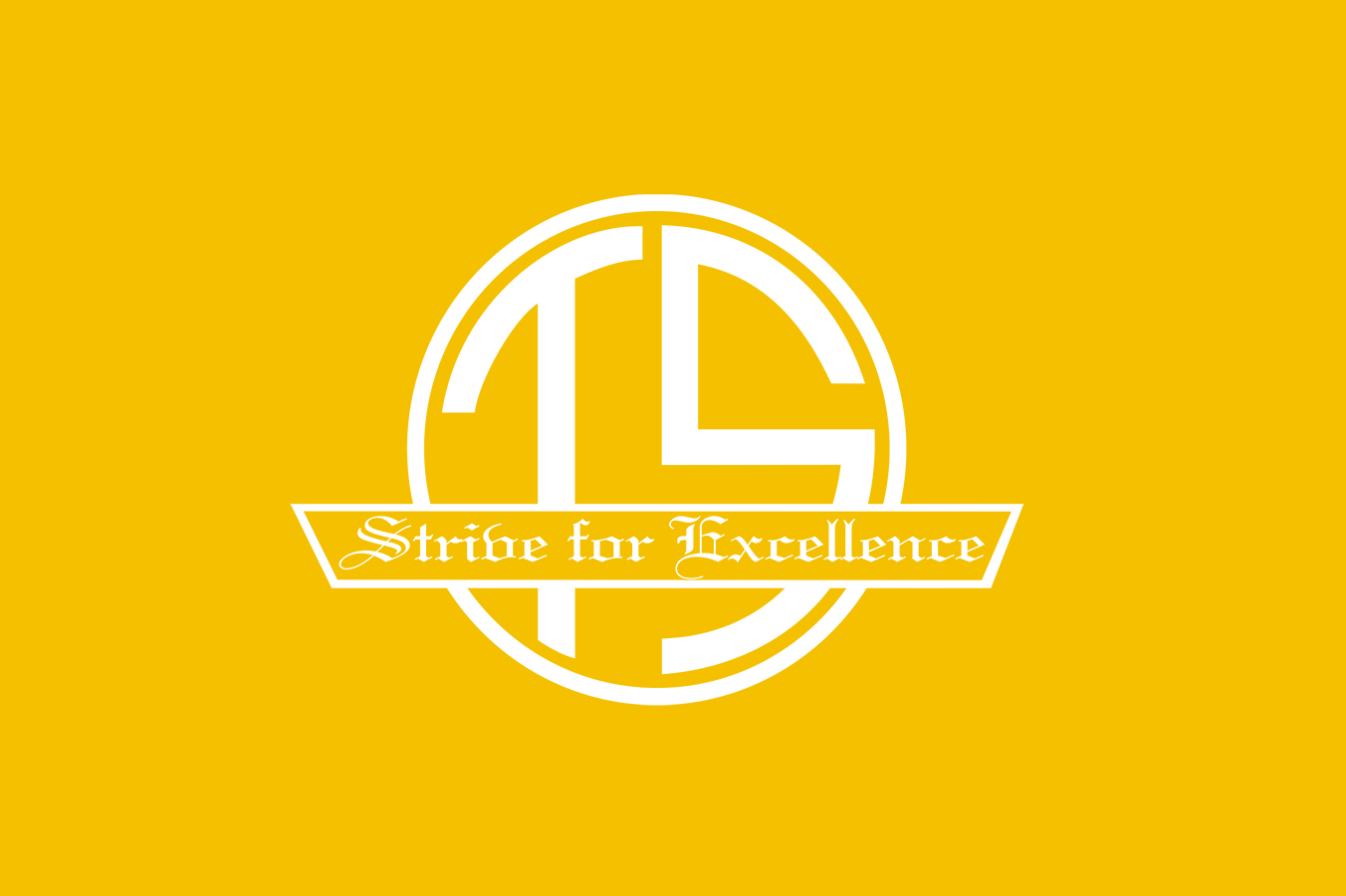

Address
- Thaajuddeen Hingun; Malé, Kaafu Atoll 20398; Maldives
- Coordinates: 4.17403°N 73.50189°E

Information
- Former name: Thaajuddeen Primary School
- School type: Government
- Motto: ފުރިހަމަކަން ލިބިގަތުމަށް ހިންމަތްކުރާށެވެ. (Strive for Excellence)
- Religious affiliation(s): Islam
- Established: 7 February 1989
- Status: Active
- Administrator: Ibrahim Saeed
- Principal: Fathimath Mohamed
- Deputy Principal (Grades 1-6): Mausooma Kamaal
- Deputy Principal (Grades 7-10): Mohamed Najeeb
- Teaching staff: 118
- Grades: 1-10
- Gender: Boys and Girls
- Color(s): Yellow and Black
- Website: thaajuddeenschool.edu.mv
- Last updated: 3 August 2024

Thaajuddeen School is one of the oldest schools in Malé, Maldives. It was officially inaugurated by former president, Maumoon Abdul Gayoom on 7 February 1989. The school has received many awards in various competitions since its inception.

== History ==
It opened as Thaajuddeen Primary School, before it was changed in 1990 to its current name. The school was named after the famous Maldivian historian, Hassan Thaajuddeen. The school first started with 19 teachers, 435 students and 29 classrooms, with 2 sessions. The school currently teaches grades 1-10 to 1492 students with 118 teachers and 33 classrooms.

The school was reconstructed and reopened on 7 June 2004, with the new building being granted aid by the people and the Government of Japan as a token of friendship in the bilateral relations between the two countries. The school was also turned into a 19-bed treatment facility by the Maldivian government during the COVID-19 pandemic.

=== Previous Principals ===
- Rashida Yoosuf (1989-1993)
- Maanaa Rafiu (1993-1998)
- Abdulla Ismail (2003-2008)
- Faznaa Ahmed (2004-2006)
- Aanifaa Ismail (2006-2009)
- Aishath Mohamed Solih (2009-2016)
- Basheera Mohamed (2016-2022)

== Facilities ==
There are various facilities around the school such as:

- Health Room
- Computer Lab
- Science Lab
- Band Room
- Art Room
- Multipurpose Audio-Visual Room
- Hall Room
- Turf

== Assault ==
On 16 January 2018, a group of people had forced themselves into the school and attacked a grade 10 student around 12:30 p.m. The injured student was rushed to Indira Gandhi Memorial Hospital. The victim suffered a laceration to the side of the head and was released. Similarly, another student from Dharumavantha School was stabbed while walking home from school at 12:55 p.m. and was treated at ADK Hospital. After the attacks on students, the then mayor of Malé city, Shifa Mohamed, had called on the police to look into the increase of attacks on students in the capital.

== Houses ==
There are 4 houses in Thaajuddeen such as:

- Dhoshimeyna
- Faamudheyri
- Faashana
- Rannabandeyri
