= Yameen Rasheed =

Maldivian blogger (1988–2017)

- ޔާމީން ރަޝީދު
- Picture of Yameen Rasheed
- Born: 10 April 1988; Feydhoo, Addu City, Maldives
- Died: 23 April 2017 (aged 29); Malé, Maldives
- Cause of death: Murdered
- Education: Bangalore Presidency College (BCA)
- Partner: Celine Peroni
- Parents: Hussain Rasheed (father); Mariyam Shafeega (mother)
- Website: thedailypanic.com

Yameen Rasheed (Dhivehi: ޔާމީން ރަޝީދު; 10 April 1988 – 23 April 2017) was a Maldivian liberal blogger and IT professional who was stabbed 16 times in his staircase. His death received international news coverage and condemnation among world leaders and had sparked protests.

== Early life and education ==
Yameen Rasheed was born on 10 April 1988 to Hussain Rasheed and Mariyam Shafeega. He was born in Feydhoo, Addu City. He moved to Trivandrum, India before he was 2 years old and studied in Sarvodaya Vidyalaya School. He studied in Bangalore Presidency College and received a Best Outgoing Student Award and did his Bachelor of Computer Applications (BCA) there as well.

== Career ==
He started blogging in India and over time befriended Maldivian bloggers. After he studied BCA, he returned to the Maldives and applied to Dhiraagu and Ooredoo Maldives, where he worked as a software developer for Dhiraagu. While he was a software developer, he wrote for magazines such as Minivan News, Himal Southasian, and The Indian Express. While he was working at the Maldives Stock Exchange, he started The Daily Panic, a blog through which he accrued a large following for his "droll reporting and biting satire" of Maldivian politics.

He was arrested during the 2015 May Day protests in the Maldives and held as a political prisoner in Dhoonidhoo Prison for 21 days.

Rasheed was one of many people who led the 'Find Moyameeha' campaign to find Ahmed Rilwan Abdulla, his friend and journalist who was abducted and murdered. Rasheed was one of two co-creators of an award-winning app to drive blood donations for Thalassemia patients. He had also been targeted and received death threats from radical groups because he spoke out against extremists and reported them to the Maldives Police Service; he posted screenshots of the threats on social media.

== Death ==
On 23 April 2017, Yameen Rasheed was found dead in his apartment staircase with multiple stab wounds on his neck, and chest. His throat was slit and parts of his skull were missing. He was later rushed to IGMH, where he was pronounced dead around 3 am.

=== Condemnation ===
The government, including then-President of the Maldives Abdulla Yameen, condemned his death and had called upon independent state institutions to bring the perpetrators to justice. Former president Mohamed Nasheed along with then-Ambassador of America to the Maldives and Sri Lanka Atul Keshap called for an investigation. The then-Director General of UNESCO Irina Bokova condemned the attack and called on the Maldivian government to investigate. Sandya Eknelygoda, a human rights activist, protested along with others at the Embassy of the Maldives in Colombo where she held a red balloon and a placard.

== Investigation ==
Rasheed's parents called upon the police to include international investigators in their investigation, and Rasheed's father, Hussain Rasheed went to Sri Lanka to meet foreign diplomats to put pressure onto the Maldivian government. It was later found out that the police refused foreign forensic help. Jared Genser, an international human rights lawyer, sent an urgent appeal to the United Nations to demand the Maldivian government for an independent international investigation by the Office of the UN High Commissioner for Human Rights into his murder. Rasheed's family also accused the police for destroying forensic evidence. Police later released three names of the suspects involved in his murder: Ismail Rasheed, Ismail Haisham Rasheed, and Ahmed Zihan Ismail, who were later named as the prime suspects. Police blocked a march held for Rasheed which was organized by Rasheed's friends and family; they signed a petition urging for an independent investigation to which the People's Majlis (parliament) rejected the emergency motion.

Police established that the motive behind Rasheed's killing was due to the perpetrators thinking he was "mocking Islam".

In August 2017, police confirmed that religious extremists had killed Rasheed. In September 2017, Rasheed's murder trial began with a secret hearing. In October 2018, the preliminary hearings were concluded and all the evidences were sealed.

In April 2018, Rasheed's family and friends held a march to call on the authorities to open trials and not a secret trial. Police tried to disperse the crowd and detained two activists. Rasheed's family have tried multiple times to meet Prosecutor General (PG) as well as police but have been turned away. In November 2018, then-President Ibrahim Mohamed Solih established the Commission on Investigation of Murder and Enforced Disappearances (DDCom) to investigate cold cases such as Rasheed's murder.

On 10 April 2019, Ahmed Rilwan and Yameen Rasheed's family established the "Rilwan and Yameen Foundation", it will work to advocating for human rights, democracy, freedom of speech, tolerance, justice and the right to a dignified life. It was established on Yameen's birthday.

A secret witness has said that Rasheed's murder was funded by people in Maldives and nobody has been investigated, arrested or charged for financing his death. In 2022, Ahmed Ismail, Ahmed Muaz, Ismail Abdul Raheem were arrested for Yameen's disappearance and later the Criminal Court released Ahmed Ismail into house arrest.

In 2023, the Criminal Court released the three suspects due to lack of evidence.

In 2024, the High Court officially found Ismail Haisham Rasheed and Ahmed Zihan Ismail guilty for the murder.

In 2025, the High Court overturned the life sentences of Haisham and Zihan with the case to be re-reviewed by the Criminal Court, the Criminal Court also ordered them to be remanded.

== Red balloon ==
The red balloon emoji 🎈 was Rasheed's last tweet before he was stabbed. It has since been used as a tribute for Rasheed's fight for freedom of expression and to spread joy among his friends and family, as well as awareness.

== See also ==
- Ahmed Rilwan
- Afrasheem Ali
