= Maldives Marketing and Public Relations Corporation scandal =

The Maldives Marketing and Public Relations Corporation (MMPRC) scandal was a major corruption scandal in the Maldives. In the scheme, more than $90 million was embezzled from Maldives Marketing and Public Relations Corporation. The scandal was made public by a 2016 investigation in Al Jazeera. It culminated in the conviction and imprisonment of former president Abdulla Yameen.

== Details ==
The embezzlement began ahead of the 2014 Maldivian parliamentary election, where funds from MMPRC were used to cover election costs and broker deals for votes in parliament. A second deal involved the leases of at least 50 islands being obtained by private companies for tourism development without public tender, for the benefit of several Maldivian government officials.

It implicated former president Abdulla Yameen, who was charged with corruption and money laundering in 2019 in relation to the deals. He was convicted in 2022, and sentenced to 11 years in prison. A number of other lawmakers were also implicated. As of 2023, Maldivian Police and the Anti-Corruption Commission have investigated 338 people in connection with the scandal. On April 18, 2024, Abdulla Yameen's 11-year prison sentence for money laundering and corruption was overturned by the Maldives High Court, which ordered a retrial on the grounds that the 2022 hearings were "unfair".

== See also ==
- Stealing Paradise
