= Addu Equatorial Hospital =

Hospital in Addu city, Maldives

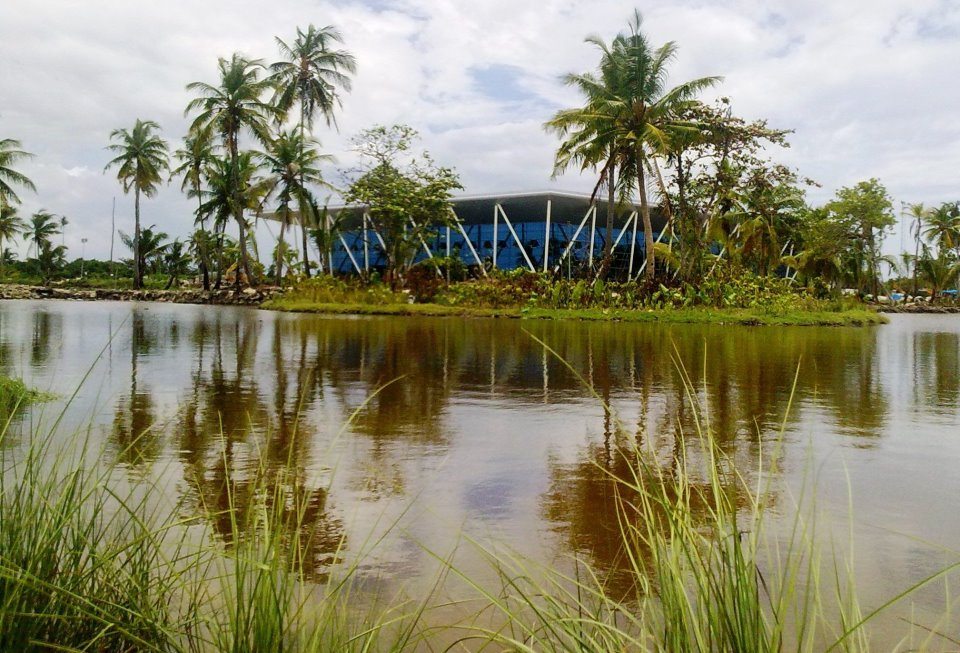

Geography
- Location: Addu City, Maldives
- Coordinates: 0.621164°S 73.095898°E

Organisation
- Care system: Governmental
- Type: General Hospital

Services
- Beds: 100

History
- Founded: 2011

Addu Equatorial Hospital (formerly known as Equatorial Convention Centre) is a 100-bed tertiary hospital located in Hithadhoo, Addu City of Maldives, and operated by the Government of Maldives.

== History ==
Before getting converted into a hospital, the Equatorial Convention Centre (ECC) was specially built for the seventeenth SAARC summit which was held in November 2011 in Addu City and nearby Fuvahmulah island. ECC was formally opened by the President of the Maldives Mohamed Nasheed on November 10, 2011.

== Halls and Rooms ==
The names of the halls and rooms in the convention centre have been named after historical and cultural places and aspects of Addu and the atolls of the Maldives with the main convention hall called 'Bodu Kiba'.

The public lobby has been named ‘Addu Thalhanmathi’ with ‘Velaanaa Fendaa’, ‘Eggamu Fendaa’, ‘Kakaa Fendaa’ and ‘Athiree Fendaa’ declared as names for the rooms of the convention centre. ‘Rasruku Kibaa’ is the name of the main banquet hall.

The two-story convention centre, which has been built for the SAARC Summit with an Rf150 million budget, has an administrative office named ‘Mulee Kotari’, a Business Centre called ‘Badikoshee Kotari’ and a Meeting Room named ‘Dhandikoshee’.

The delegation offices have been named after the atolls of the Maldives; ‘Thiladhunmathi Kotari’, Faadhippolhu Kotari’, ‘Ihavandhippolhu Kotari’, ‘Hadhunmathi Kotari’, ‘Huvadhoo Kotari’, ‘Kolhumadulu Kotari’, ‘Nilandhe Kotari’ and ‘Maalhosmadulu Kotari’.

Rooms located on the first floor include the ‘Dhondhanbu Kibaa’ and ‘Jaafaanu Kibaa’ Function Rooms. The Seminar Rooms located on the first floor have been named as ‘Mas’udi Kotari’, ‘Pyrad Kotari’, ‘Abu’l Barakat Kotari’, ‘Batuta Kotari’, ‘Kalhuoh Fummi Kotari’, ‘Thirnaa Kotari, ‘Jaliyaa Kotari’ and ‘Kalhihaara Kotari’.
