= Ahmed Rilwan =

Maldivian journalist (1986–2014)

Ahmed Rilwan Abdulla
- އަހުމަދު ރިލްވާން ޢަބްދުﷲ
- Picture of Rilwan
- Born: Ahmed Rilwan Abdulla; 18 January 1986; Maafannu, Malé, Maldives
- Disappeared: 8 August 2014; Hulhumalé ferry terminal, Malé, Maldives
- Status: Dead
- Cause of death: Decapitated and drowned
- Other name: Moyameehaa
- Occupation: Journalist
- Known for: Blogging, reporting, journalist
- Height: 5 ft 10 in (178 cm)
- Parents: Abdulla Moosa (father); Aminath Easa (mother)
- Relatives: 9 siblings

Ahmed Rilwan Abdulla (Dhivehi: އަހުމަދު ރިލްވާން ޢަބްދުﷲ; 18 January 1986 – 8 August 2014) was a Maldivian journalist, reporter and blogger who was abducted and killed in 2014. His disappearance received international recognition and sparked protests.

== Early life and education ==
Ahmed Rilwan Abdulla was born in Maafannu, Malé on 18 January 1986 to Aminath Easa and Abdulla Moosa. He started his Preschool in Maafannu Madharsa and later studied at Thaajuddeen School. He started his higher education in the Maldives College for Higher Education (now known as Maldives National University) in Foundation courses, different Information and Technology courses. He later studied Communications and journalism and received his English literature degree at the University of Mysore.

== Career ==
Rilwan was a journalist working for Minivan News. Prior to his disappearance, Rilwan had frequently received death threats from gangs and religious extremists for advocating religious tolerance and for being an open critic of government policy and radical Islam.

== Disappearance ==
On 8 August 2014, Rilwan was last seen at the Hulhumale' Ferry Terminal in Malé at 12:44 am and an eyewitness later said that he never boarded the bus when he arrived to Hulhumalé. Around 1:30–2:30 am, Rilwan's neighbours reported to the police after seeing a man being forced into a car with a knife in front of his apartment building. Maldivian journalists expressed concern for Rilwan's disappearance and has said that its a threat for freedom of press.

A protest took place in September 2014 titled the '#suvaalumarch' (Question March) to protest, after the police not being able to answer key questions. Rilwan's family submitted a petition with more than 5000 signatures to the People's Majlis' national security committee which was later thrown out on a technicality and stalled. In October 2014, his family accused the police of negligence and filed a complaint with the Police Integrity Commission (PIC).

In August 2015, a march was held to mark one year of Rilwan going missing where police pepper sprayed Rilwan's family. A complaint was later filed by his mother, Aminath Easa, to the Human Rights Commission of the Maldives (HRCM) over the use of pepper spray. On 28 August 2015, Reporters Without Borders (RSF) sent a letter to the UN Working Group on Enforced or Involuntary Disappearances (WGEID) and the Working Group on Arbitrary Detention which urged the UN to "initiate the relevant procedures with the countries that are breaking international law in this area."

In January 2016, Rilwan's family sent letters to the National Integrity Commission and the HRCM requesting their help for an independent inquiry, later President Abdulla Yameen ordered the Ministry of Home Affairs to investigate Rilwan's disappearance. In April 2016, Alif Rauf and Mohamed Nooradeen were arrested by police and were named suspects, later they were moved to house arrest. The Prosecutor General's Office (PGO) appealed that decision to the High Court and won, leading Alif and Nooradeen back to a remand facility. In May 2016, Rilwan's family later accused the government of being involved in his disappearance, which the WGEID later summoned the Maldivian government in its 109th session for a response about the disappearance of Rilwan. The Maldivian government later denied that it was responsible or that it had involvement in his disappearance. In June 2016, suspects of Rilwan's abduction was transferred to home arrest.

In 2017, to mark 3 years of Rilwan's abduction a march was held and was met by pepper spray and arrests made by police officers. Police arrested politicians as well as staff members of Transparency Maldives, an NGO. In September 2017, PGO charged the three suspects with terrorism. After hearing ended, suspects charged with terrorism was acquitted by the Criminal Court, however, the PGO has said that they will appeal the Criminal Court's verdict.

In November 2018, President Ibrahim Mohamed Solih formed the Commission on Investigation of Murders and Enforced Disappearances (DDCom) to solve cold cases like Rilwan.

In September 2019, Husnu Al Suood, the then-President of DDCom said that evidence states that Rilwan was murdered, and 14 people are under a travel ban as well as that Rilwan was killed by local affiliates to Al-Qaeda. It was found out in the investigative report by DDCom that Rilwan was decapitated and drowned by local Al-Qaeda affiliates. The Maldives Police Services' Professional Standard Command (PSC) has also stated that they would take action against officers affiliated with Rilwan's abduction, which they sacked two officers. In December 2019, DDCom presented charges against the perpetrators to the PGO which they denied, citing inadequate investigations.

In 2022, DDCom presented its final report on Rilwan's case confirming that he was killed and that the suspects joined the Syrian civil war.

In 2025, the Association for Democracy in the Maldives published a press release calling for the Muizzu administration to release DDCom's investigation report into his disappearance.

== Moyameeha Campaign ==
Find Moyameeha is a campaign led by Rilwan's family, friends and supporters. 'Moyameeha' is Rilwan's Twitter account handle. This campaign held organized protests, lobbied politicians, held marches and placed missing person posters in the streets of Malé. It's also revealed that people working in the campaign received death threats, including his employer, Minivan News. The question mark (❓) is affiliated to Rilwan due to the question march where people had placards showing question marks.

== See also ==
- Yameen Rasheed
- Afrasheem Ali
