= Maldives Stock Exchange =

Stock exchange in the Maldives

- Dhivehi Raajjeyge Hissaage Baazaaru

- Type: Stock Exchange
- Location: Malé, Maldives
- Coordinates: 4°10′44.17″N 73°30′36.98″E
- Founded: 2008
- Currency: MVR
- No. of listings: 10
- Market cap: MVR 13.2 billion (20 August 2018)
- Volume: MVR 59.2 million (2008)
- Indices: MASIX
- Website: stockexchange.mv

The Maldives Stock Exchange (MSE) is a private sector Stock Exchange located at 3rd Floor, H. Gadhamoo Building in Malé, Maldives.

A Securities Trading Floor (STF) was first established on 14 April 2002. It was operated by the Capital Market Development Authority (CMDA), the regulator. However, the Securities Act 2006 requires that CMDA invite offers from a private company to establish and operate a stock exchange. The Maldives Stock Exchange Pvt Ltd has been licensed to operate as a Stock Exchange since the 23 January 2008. As such the MSE started its operations effective from 24 January 2008.

The primary function of MSE is to facilitate companies raise capital through the issue of new securities. The MSE provides a regulated market for the trading of securities between investors. The MSE is also the centre for trade reporting and pricing of the stocks. It also provides clearing, settlement and depository services through a subsidiary, the Maldives Securities Depository (MSD)

There are ten listed companies on Maldives Stock Exchange as of 20 August 2024.

The Maldives Stock Exchange Index (MASIX) was published on 28 October 2004. Like other stock market indices, MASIX captures the overall movement in prices & changing expectations of the Maldives Stock Market. MASIX – represents the Maldives Stock Exchange.

== See also ==
- Economy of the Maldives
- Stock exchanges of small economies
