= Afrasheem Ali =

Maldivian politician (died 2012)

Afraasheem Ali
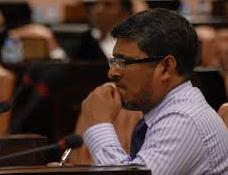

Member of the People's Majlis
- In office 28 May 2009 – 2 October 2012
- Constituency: Ungoofaaru

Personal details
- Born: Ungoofaru, Raa Atoll, Maldives
- Died: 2 October 2012 Henveiru, Malé, Maldives
- Party: Progressive Party of Maldives
- Other political affiliations: Dhivehi Rayyithunge Party (2007–2011)
- Education: International Islamic University Malaysia (PhD)

Afrasheem Ali (died 2 October 2012) was a Maldivian politician who was a member of the People's Majlis for the Progressive Party of Maldives representing Raa Atoll Ungoofaru Constituency, in the 17th sitting of the People's Majlis from 2009 until his assassination in 2012.

== Education ==
Ali went to the International Islamic University Malaysia and did his Doctor of Philosophy.

== Career ==
After completing his PhD, he returned to the Maldives in 2007 and joined the Dhivehi Rayyithunge Party (DRP). He also held the position of Director General of the Ministry of Home Affairs as well as the advisor to the Minister. He was elected as the People's Majlis member for the Ungoofaru constituency in the 2009 parliamentary election. He was also one of the members of the council of the DRP and the president of the religious affairs council. In October 2011, he switched to the Progressive Party of Maldives (PPM) and became a council member and the president of the religious affairs council. He held the position of Vice President of the Judicial Service Commission.

== Death ==
Afrasheem was murdered near his residence on 2 October 2012. He was already pronounced dead when brought to ADK Hospital that day.

The investigation into the death of Afrasheem was one of the largest scale operations carried out by the Maldives Police Service with regular press briefings. On 23 May 2013 Hussain Humam, a suspect apprehended related to the stabbing of Afrasheem, confessed to the murder, which he later retracted as he alleged he was coerced into doing so by then State Minister for Home Affairs Mohamed Fayaz. Humam was convicted, and sentenced to death. If it is carried out, his execution would be the first in over sixty years in the Maldives. Amnesty International reports that it has serious concerns about the trial and conviction. His execution was halted by a request of the United Nations Human Rights Committee.

== See also ==
- Ahmed Rilwan
- Yameen Rasheed
