= ADK Hospital =

Coordinates: 4.1750°N 73.5153°E

ADK Hospital އޭޑީކޭ ހޮސްޕިޓަލް

Geography
- Location: Sosun Magu, Malé, Maldives

Organisation
- Care system: Tertiary
- Type: Private

Services
- Emergency department: Yes
- Beds: 245

History
- Founded: 1987

Links
- Website: adkhospital.mv
- Lists: Hospitals in Maldives

ADK Hospital (Dhivehi: އޭޑީކޭ ހޮސްޕިޓަލް) is the first and the largest private tertiary hospital in Maldives. The hospital is one of the two major private hospitals located in Greater Malé region. The acronym ‘ADK’ is derived from the name late Abdul Rahman Dhon Kaleyfaanu, who is the father of Ahmed Nashid, one of the founding members of ADK Group.

== Logo ==
The logo of ADK Hospital was rebranded in late 2008. The new logo depicts a snake wrapped around a wand representing the rod of Asclepius, which is used as an international medical symbol depicting healing through medicine. The apple denotes health and well-being as well as prevention.

== History ==
The origins of ADK Hospital go back to the small clinic founded in 1987 by Mr. Ahmed Nashid and Late Mr. Hassan Ibrahim under the name of "Mediclinic". This marked the beginning of the ADK Group of companies. The facilities of the clinic were extended and strengthened over the five years that followed to satisfy the need of the clients of the clinics. The service was named ADK Medical Center in 1992. The group realized its most notable single development in 1996: the establishment of ADK Hospital in Malé, the first private hospital in the Maldives, which brought about a monumental shift in the group's future direction.

== Services ==
ADK Hospital has been awarded the Facilities Improvement Initiative of the Year 2020 - Maldives by the Healthcare Asia Awards. There are over 200 beds in the hospital, with an extra 6 beds in the Intensive Care Unit (ICU), 12 in the High Dependency unit (HDU), 5 in the Cardiac Care Unit (CCU) and 10 in the Neonatal Intensive Care Unit (NICU).

29 specialties and over 90 physicians covering nearly all medical specialties and sub-specialties. There are advanced diagnostics and therapeutics, dental, general and specialty medicine, surgical services, intensive care, and rehabilitation. There are currently 5 operation theatres in the Hospital, including Sunrise, Beach, Underwater, Seed and Nest, the latter two dedicated to obstetrics and gynecological surgeries. It also has biplane Cardiac Catheterization Laboratory providing high-end cardiac and neurological interventions.

== Departments ==
- Anesthesiology
- Cardiology
- Cardiothoracic and Vascular Surgery
- Dentistry
- Dermatology and Venereology
- ENT
- Emergency Medicine
- Endocrinology
- Gastroenterology
- Internal Medicine
- Laboratory
- Microbiology
- Neurology
- Nephrology
- Neurosurgery
- Nutrition & Dietetics
- Obstetrics & Gynecology
- Oncology
- Orthopedics
- Ophthalmology
- Pediatrics
- Physiotherapy & Rehabilitation
- Psychiatry
- Pulmonary and Respiratory Medicine
- Radiology
- Reconstructive, Regenerative and Aesthetic Surgery (Plastic Surgery)
- Speech Therapy
- Surgery
- Urology
- Pathology
- Rheumatology
