= Maldives Police Service =

Civilian police force of the Republic of Maldives

Maldives Police Service ދިވެހި ފުލުހުންގެ ޚިދުމަތް
- Logo
- Motto: To Protect and Serve

Agency overview
- Formed: 1 September 2004
- Preceding agency: National Security Service
- Employees: 10000+

Jurisdictional structure
- Population: 517,887 (January 2023 est.)
- Legal jurisdiction: Republic of Maldives
- Constituting instrument: The Police Act, 34/2020
- General nature: Civilian police

Operational structure
- Headquarters: Shaheed Hussain Adam Building, Boduthakurufaanu Magu, Malé, Maldives
- Elected officer responsible: Ali Ihusan, Minister of Homeland Security, Labour and Technology
- Agency executives: Ahmed Mohamed, Commissioner of Police; Farhad Fikry, Deputy Commissioner of Police
- Parent agency: Ministry of Homeland Security, Labour and Technology

Facilities
- Police Stations: 170+ including Police Posts and Police Desks

Website
- police.gov.mv

The Maldives Police Service (Dhivehi: ދިވެހި ފުލުހުންގެ ޚިދުމަތް, romanized: dhivehi fuluhunge khidhumaiy) is the civilian national police force of the Republic of Maldives. It is responsible for enforcing criminal and traffic law, enhancing public safety, maintaining order, and keeping the peace throughout the Maldives. The organisation comes under the control of the Ministry of Homeland Security, Labour and Technology.

== History ==
The police service was established during the reign of Al-Sultan Muhammad Shamsuddeen III on 29 March 1933 with 120 police officers. Members of the force were issued the traditional Maldivian mundu and libaas as well as a cap, belt, and straps.

During the early days of the organisation, there was violence between the foreign merchants belonging to Bohra groups (followers of Tayyibi Isma'ilism) and the Maldivians. The foreigners ceased to do business with the Maldivians and closed their shops. The Police's inability to resolve the situation led to full-strength military intervention, which brought the situation under control by 15 May 1933.

The initial investigation office was small, with only three investigation tables, each representing a section of the service: Theft, Political and Serious Crimes. In 1970, the police office moved to the building that has since become the site of the Bandara Koshi library. Traffic Control and Accidents formed as a fourth section of the Police. The police force was temporarily disbanded and then re-established on 13 March 1972 as a branch of the security force, then known as the National Guards, functioning under the Ministry of Public Safety.

The service's operating procedures, established in 1933, were maintained until the election of Maumoon Abdul Gayoom on 11 November 1978. When the force was restructured under the Ministry of Defence and National Security on 10 January 1979, National Guards were renamed as the National Security Service. In 1985, the headquarters were relocated to the building of the current Ministry of Defence and National Security. Apart from an administrative section, five investigation sections were formed.

In 1992, David Price from the West Yorkshire Police introduced the service's modern working structure, including the police beats and mobile patrols. They then shifted to the Shaheedh Hussain Adam Building in 1999. On 1 September 2004, the Maldives Police Service was formed under the Ministry of Home Affairs, signalling a major functional shift of the present administration. The National Security Service was later renamed the Maldives National Defence Force.

On 1 July 2013, a police reserve force known as the Special Constabulary was inaugurated. On 23 July 2013, the first official ceremony to commemorate Police Memorial Day was held, and the Police Memorial Wall was inaugurated to honour the members of the Maldives Police Service who died in the line of duty. The day is now an annual nationwide event that aims to remember, honour and pay respects to every police officer who died in the line of duty.

== Organizational structure ==
The MPS is divided into various departments and units including:

- Office Of The Commissioner (OC)
  - Police Cooperative Society (POLCO)
  - Grievance Unit (GR)
  - Commissioners Bureau (CB)
    - Entry Management Unit (ENM)
    - Executive Administration Unit (EXA)
      - Protocol and Staff Officers Unit (PASOU)
      - Government Affairs Unit (GVA)
  - Legal Counsel Wing (LGC)
  - Public Trust and Confidence Management Wing (PTCM)
    - Crime Prevention Department (CPD)
      - Community Outreach Programs Unit (COP)
      - Research And Development Unit (RDU)
    - Public Affairs Department (PA)
      - Police Museum Unit (PM)
      - Event Management Unit (EMU)
      - Graphics And Production Unit (GPR)
  - Strategic Communication Management Wing (SCM)
    - Police Media Department (PM)
      - Multimedia and Broadcasting Unit (MMBU)
      - Public Relations and Content Team (PRCT)
      - Social Media and Digital Engagement Unit (SMDE)
    - International Relations Department (IR)
      - Consular Liaison Unit (CLU)
        - Consular Liaison Section (CL)
        - Project Monitoring Section (PM)
      - Foreign Relations Unit (FRU)
        - Americas And Multilateral Organizations Section (AMO)
        - Central South And East Asia Section (CSEA)
        - Europe Oceania And Africa Section (EOA)
  - Strategic Planning and Legal services Wing (SPLS)
    - Strategic Planning And Development Department (SPD)
    - Policies and Standardization Department (PS)
    - Legal Services Department (LSD)
- Professional Standards Command (PSC)
  - Administration And Liaison Unit (ALU)
  - Internal Investigation Department (IID)
    - Internal Investigation Unit (IIU)
    - Board Secretariat (BSC)
  - Standards And Compliance Audit Department (SCA)
    - Internal Audit Unit (IAU)
    - Ethics And Awareness Unit (EAU)
      - Inspection Unit (IPU)
      - Awareness Unit (AWU)
      - Audit Unit (AU)
- Directorate Of Intelligence
- Central Investigations Command
  - Drug Enforcement Wing (DE)
    - Admin And Exhibit Unit (AEU)
    - Legal And Technical Analysis Unit (LTAU)
    - Drugs & Substance Abuse Control Department (DSAC)
      - Drugs And Substance Abuse Investigation Unit (DSAIU)
      - Multi-Agency Engagements Unit (MAEU)
    - Drug Trafficking Investigations Department (DTI)
      - Drug Trafficking Investigation Unit (DTIU)
      - Drug Financing Investigation Unit (DFIU)
    - Counter-Narcotics Operations Department (CNO)
      - Operations Unit (Alcohol And Narcotics) (OAN)
      - Special Operations Unit (SOU)
  - Economic Crime Investigations Wing (ECI)
    - Financial Analysis Unit (FAU)
    - Complex Financial Investigations Department (CFI)
      - Corporate Corruption Investigations Unit (CCI)
      - Anti-Money Laundering Investigations Unit (AMLI)
      - Asset Recovery Unit (ASR)
    - Fraud and Financial Investigations Department (FAFI)
      - Counterfeit Investigations Unit (CI)
      - Embezzlement Investigations Unit (EMBI)
      - Forgery Investigations Unit (FGI)
      - Anti-Deception Investigations Unit (ADI)
    - Anti-Scam Centre (ASC)
      - Prevention and Education Unit (PAE)
      - Scam Investigations Unit (SCI)
      - Anti-Scam Rapid Response Unit (ASRR)
      - Anti-Scam Data Analytics Unit (ASDA)
  - Family And Child Protection Wing (FCP)
    - Advocacy And Project Implementation Unit (API)
    - Family and Child Protection Administration Unit (AU)
    - Crimes Against Children Department (CACD)
      - Child Abuse and Missing Children Investigations Unit (CAMCU)
      - Child Exploitation Investigations Unit (CEIU)
      - Crime Against Children Monitoring Unit (CACMU)
    - Juvenile Offences Department (JOD)
      - Juvenile Offences Investigation Unit (JOIU)
      - Juvenile Offences Monitoring Unit (JOMU)
    - Family And Gender Affairs Department (FGAD)
      - Gender-Based Violence Investigations Unit (GBVIU)
      - Domestic Violence Investigations Unit (DVIU)
      - Family and Gender Affairs Monitoring Unit (FGMU)
  - Gang Crime Enforcement Wing (GCE)
    - Administration & Operational Support Unit (AOSU)
    - Gang Crime Suppression Department (GCS)
    - Gang Crime Investigations Department (GCI)
  - Investigation Quality Control and Compliance Wing (IQCAC)
  - Major Crime Investigations Wing (MCI)
    - Death And Homicide Investigations Department (DAHI)
      - Death Investigations Unit (DTI)
      - Homicide Investigations Unit (HMI)
      - Death And Homicide Investigation Support Unit (DAHIS)
    - Terrorism And Violent Extremism Investigations Department (TVEI)
      - Anti-Terrorism Operations Unit (ATO)
      - Terrorism Investigations Unit (TRI)
      - Terrorism Investigation Support Unit (TRIS)
    - Serious And Organized Crime Investigations Department (SOCI)
      - Robbery and Theft Investigations Unit (RATI)
      - Serious Crime investigations Unit (SCI)
      - Serious and Organized Crime Investigation Support Unit (SOCIS)
    - Anti-Human Trafficking Department (AHTD)
      - Illegal Expats Operations Unit (IEO)
      - Anti-Human Trafficking Investigations Unit (AHTI)
  - Specialist Investigation Support Wing (SIS)
    - Witness Protection Unit (WPU)
    - Regional Support Unit (RGS)
    - Victim Support Department (VSD)
    - Bureau Of Crime Records (BCR)
      - Filing Archiving And Disposal Unit (FAD)
      - Data Entry And Validation Unit (DEVU)
      - Crime Records Unit (CRU)
    - Evidence Management Service (EVMS)
  - Joint Intelligence and Investigation Taskforce (JIIT)
- Forensic Services Directorate (FS)
  - Administration And Stock Control Unit (ASCU)
  - Quality Assurance Department (QA)
  - Crime Scene Investigation Department (CSID)
    - Central Crime Scene Investigation Unit (CCSI)
    - Regional Crime Scene Investigation (DCSI)
  - Evidence Control Department (EC)
  - Digital Evidence Laboratory (DEL)
  - Dna Laboratory (DNAL)
  - Drug And Chemical Laboratory (DCL)
  - Finger Print Laboratory (FPL)
  - Physical Evidence Laboratory (PEL)
- Operational Support Command (OSC)
  - Marine Police Wing (MP)
    - Administration Development And Awareness Unit (ADAU)
    - Marine Enforcement and Operations Department (MEOD)
      - Marine Operations and Transport Unit (MOPT)
      - Police Diving Unit (PDU)
    - Marine Investigation Department (MID)
      - Marine Investigation Unit (MIU)
    - Maintenance and Vessels Management Department (MVM)
    - Regional Vessel Management Department (RVM)
    - Marine Engineering Department (ME)
  - Police Custodial Wing (PC)
    - Administration Unit (AU)
    - Medical Support Unit (MSU)
    - Custodial Standards and Development Unit (CSD)
    - Male Custody Department (MC)
      - Male Custodial Security and Response Unit (MCSR)
      - Arrestee Management Unit - Male (AMUM)
    - Dhoonidhoo Custody Department (DC)
      - Custodial Security and Response - Dhoonidhoo Unit (CSRD)
      - Arrestee Management Unit - Dhoonidhoo (AMUD)
      - Logistics And Maintenance Unit (LM)
    - Fugitive Recovery and Custodial Support Services Department (FRCSS)
      - Liaison Unit (AL)
      - Recovery And Support Unit (RSU)
      - Escorting Unit (EU)
  - Protective Security Wing (PS)
    - Administration Unit (AD)
    - Diplomatic And Critical Infrastructure Security Department (DCISD)
      - Male Operation Unit (MOU)
      - Hulhumale Operation Unit (HOU)
    - Special Protection Department (SPD)
      - Special Protection Unit (SPU)
      - Motorcade and Escort Unit (MEU)
      - Executive Security Unit (ESU)
    - Special Constabulary Management Department (SCMD)
      - Male Operation Unit (MO)
      - Hulhumale Operation Unit (HOU)
      - Villimale Operation Unit (VMO)
      - Money Security Unit (MS)
  - Specialist Tactical Response Wing (STR)
    - Contingency Planning and Operational Support Unit
    - Specialist Operations Department (SOD)
      - Operational Response Development and Support Unit (ORDS)
      - Public Safety and Response Unit
      - Special Response and Deployment Unit (SRDU)
      - Special Weapons and Tactics (SWAT)
  - Canine Department (CN)
    - Canine Operations Unit (COP)
    - Administration Unit (ADMIN)
- National College Of Policing And Law Enforcement (NCPLE)
  - Executive Directors Office (GPA)
    - Quality Assurance Audit and Policy Review Unit (QAAPR)
    - Research Hub (RH)
    - Corporate Communications and External Engagement Unit (CCEE)
  - Administration Wing (AU)
    - Corporate Affairs Department (CA)
      - Central Administration Unit (CA)
      - Financial Services Unit (FA)
    - Facilities Management Department (FM)
      - Infrastructure Maintenance Unit (IM)
      - Utility and Motor Transport Unit (UMTU)
      - Campus Security and Training Equipment Unit (CSTE)
    - Male Campus (MC)
      - Refresher and Retraining Coordination Unit (RRC)
    - Police Training Centre Dh.Vaanee (PTCDV)
      - Vaanee Development and Maintenance Unit (VDM)
  - Training And Education Wing (TE)
    - Registration and Student Services Department (RSS)
      - Registration and Records Unit (RR)
      - Student Services Unit (SS)
      - Field Training Support Unit (FTS)
    - Teaching and Learning Management Department (TLM)
      - Curriculum Development and Teaching Support Unit (CDTS)
      - Examination and Assessment Unit (EA)
      - Library and E-learning Unit (LEL)
    - Centre for Law Enforcement Initial Trainings (CLEIT)
    - Initial Training Course (Course Officer) (CO)
      - Student Officer Management Unit (SOM)
      - In-Door Classes Unit (IDC)
      - Out-Door Classes Unit (ODC)
    - Centre for Investigation Crime and Justice Studies (CICJS)
      - Investigation Trainings Unit (IT)
      - Intelligence and Forensics Studies Unit (IFS)
      - Crime and Justice Studies Unit (CJS)
    - Centre for Public Safety and Security Studies (CPSSS)
      - Physical and Fitness Trainings Unit (PFT)
      - Security and Maritime-Enforcement Trainings Unit (SMET)
      - Operational Safety and Tactical Trainings Unit (OSTT)
      - Police Gym Unit (PG)
    - Centre for Leadership and Management Studies (CLMS)
      - Professional Development Programs Unit (PDP)
      - Leadership Hub (LH)
- Digital Data and Technology Command (DDT)
  - Administration and Training Unit (ATU)
  - Information Systems Department (IS)
    - System Development Unit (DEV)
    - System Operation Unit (OPS)
    - System Support Unit (SST)
  - ICT Projects And Services Department (ICTPS)
    - Helpdesk Unit (HD)
    - Electronic Service Centre (ESC)
    - Sound And Multimedia Unit (SM)
    - Project Management Unit (PM)
    - ICT Asset Management Unit (FSS)
  - ICT Infrastructure Department (ICTI)
    - Network Operations Center (NOC)
    - Datacenter Unit (DC)
    - Core Networks Unit (CNTW)
    - Communications Unit (CI)
    - Video Surveillance and IOT Unit (VSAIOT)
  - Data and Innovation Centre (DAIC)
    - Data Analytics Unit (DTA)
    - Data Governance and Compliance Unit (DGAC)
    - AI and Annotation Unit (AIAA)
    - Centre of Excellence (COE)
    - Research and Development Unit (RAD)
  - Cyber Crime Centre (CCC)
    - Cyber Security Operations Centre (CSOC)
    - Cyber Analysis Unit (CBA)
    - Cyber Governance Risk and Compliance Unit (CGRAC)
    - Cyber Outreach and Awareness Unit (COAA)
    - Cyber Crime Investigation Unit (CCI)
- Services Development Directorate (SDD)
  - Police Family Association (PFA)
  - Police Club (PC)
  - Finance And Budget Management Wing (FBM)
    - Administration Unit (AU)
    - Quality Assurance and Compliance Unit (QAC)
    - Budget Management and Control Department (BMC)
      - Reporting Unit (RP)
      - Budget Management and Reporting Unit (BMR)
      - Accounting Unit (ACU)
      - Welfare And Cash Management Unit (WCM)
    - Procurement Department (PROC)
      - Requisition Management Unit (RM)
      - Tender Management Unit (TM)
      - Order Management Unit (OM)
    - Stock And Asset Management Department (SAM)
      - Stock and Distribution Unit (SDB)
      - Asset Management Unit (AMG)
  - Financial Executives Wing (FE)
  - Human Resources Wing (HR)
    - Ceremonies Officer Department (CO)
    - Workforce Planning and Management Department (WPM)
      - Admin and Planning Unit (AP)
      - Recruitment And Deployment Management Unit (RDMU)
      - Promotion And Career Support Unit (PCSU)
      - Compensation And Benefits Administration Unit (CBA)
      - Personnel Management Unit (PM)
      - Retirement and Post Career Management Unit (RPCM)
    - Workforce Health and Wellbeing Department (WHW)
      - Health Facilities Management Unit (HFM)
      - Medical Operations Unit (MO)
      - Health Safety and Mental Awareness Unit (HSMA)
      - Administration and Invoice Verification Unit (AIV)
  - Infrastructure Planning and Development Wing (IPD)
    - Infrastructure And Building Development Department (IBD)
      - Designing and Development Unit (DD)
      - Project Management Unit (PM)
    - Infrastructure Facility Management Department (IFM)
      - Maintenance Unit (MT)
      - House Keeping Unit (HSK)
- Service Support Directorate (SSD)
  - Engineering And Mechanical Services Wing (EMS)
    - Mechanical Engineering Department (MED)
      - Automotive Engineering Unit (AEU)
      - Painting And Tinkering Section (PTS)
    - Electrical Engineering Department (EEU)
      - Engine And Generator Repair Section (EGP)
      - Air-Condition And Refrigeration Section (ACRS)
      - Electrical Equipment Management and Service Section (EQMSS)
      - Electrical Unit (ELU)
      - Aircondition And Refrigeration Unit (ARU)
      - Power Generation and Desalination Unit (PGDU)
    - Regional Engineering Department (RED)
      - Upper North Police Workshop (UNPWS)
      - North Police Workshop (NPWS)
      - North Central Police Workshop (NCPWS)
      - South Central Police Workshop (SCPWS)
      - Hulhumale Police Workshop (HPWS)
    - Engineering Management Department (EMD)
      - Transport Management Unit (TMU)
        - Vehicle Operation Section (VOS)
        - Vehicle Management Section (VMS)
        - Auto Detailing Section (ADS)
      - Administrative Unit (EMUAU)
      - Stock Management Unit (SMU)
  - Logistic Support and Police Equipment Management Wing (LSPEM)
    - Logistics Department (LG)
      - Catering Unit (CU)
      - Police Armory Unit (PAR)
    - Uniform And Accessories Department (UA)
      - Uniform Services Unit (UAU)
      - Uniform Stock Management Unit (USMU)

== Rank structure before 2020 ==
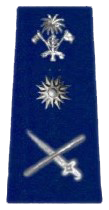
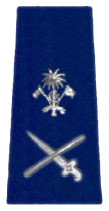
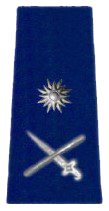
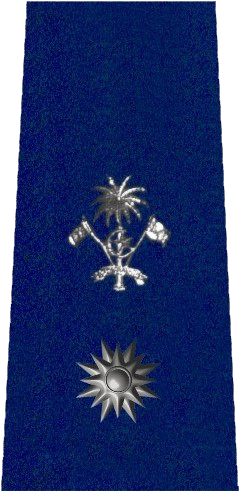
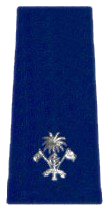
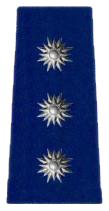
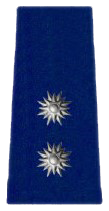
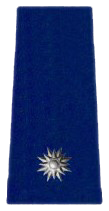
	Commissioner			Superintendent		Inspector
Maldives Police Service
Maldives Police Service	Commissioner of police	Deputy commissioner	Assistant commissioner	Chief superintendent	Superintendent of police	Chief inspector of police	Inspector of police	Sub inspector of Police

	Station inspector		Sergeant		Other
Maldives Police Service							No insignia
Maldives Police Service	Police chief station inspector	Police station inspector	Police staff sergeant	Sergeant	Police corporal	Police lance corporal	Police constable

== Equipment ==
On December 26, 2025, the National Disaster Management Authority (NDMA), in partnership with the United Nations Development Programme (UNDP) in the Maldives, donated 23 items and 2,064 individual units of specialized rescue equipment to the Maldives Police Service (MPS), which included firefighting gear, pumps, and power equipment, marine and water rescue gear, emergency medical and first-aid equipment, field operations and technical rescue support, and personal protective equipment (PPE), as part of the Risk Informed Development in Small Island Developing States (RIDS in SIDS) project. This was done using donations from Denmark, Luxembourg, and the Republic of Korea.
