= List of vice presidents of the Maldives =

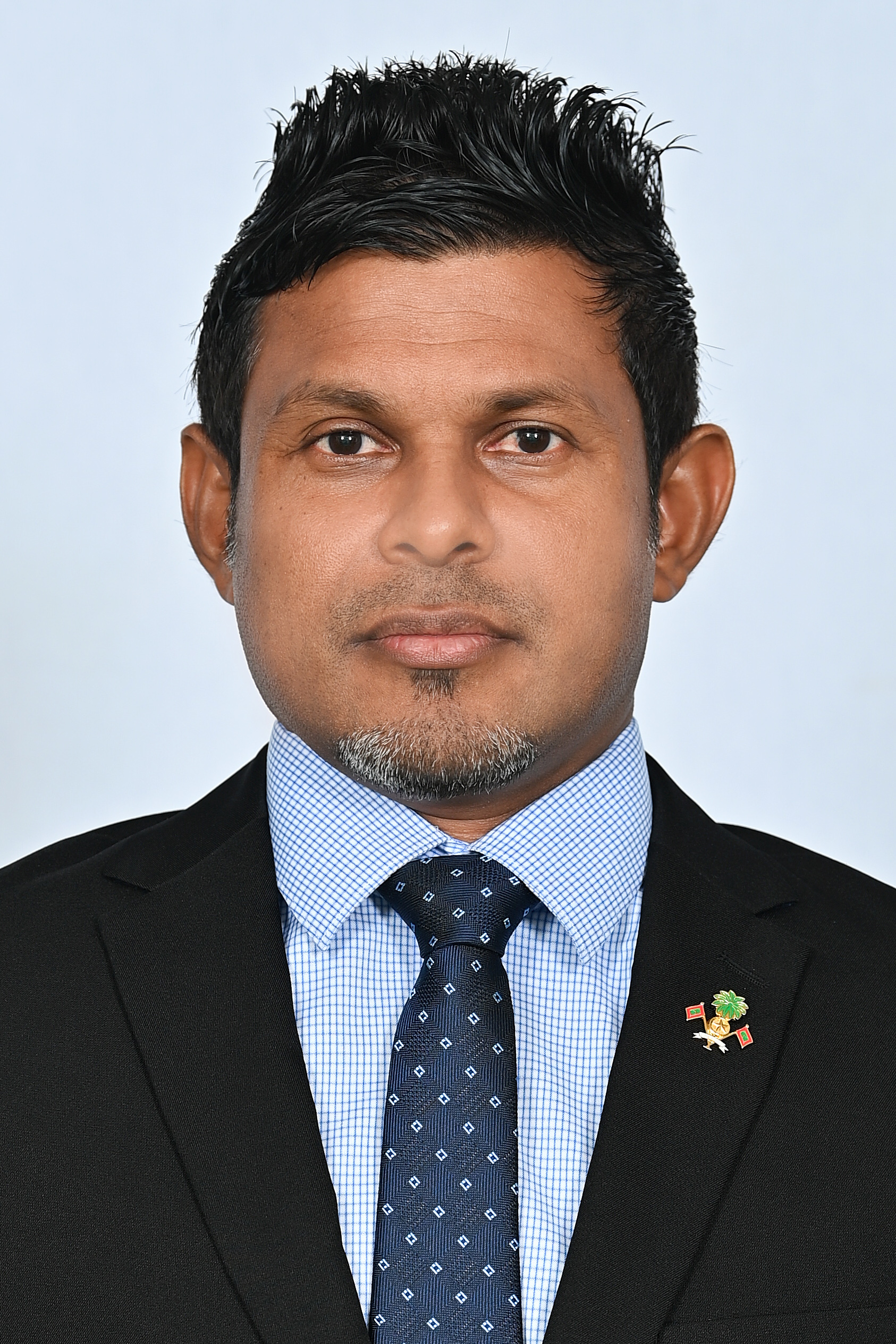
Hussain Mohamed Latheef, Vice President of the Maldives since 2023

The Vice President of the Maldives is the second highest official in the executive branch of the government of the Maldives, after the president, and is first in the presidential line of succession. As outlined in Article 112 of the Constitution of the Maldives, the Vice President is tasked with supporting the president in carrying out their duties and responsibilities. If the office of the President becomes vacant due to any reason, the Vice President succeeds to the presidency.

In accordance with Article 107(b) of the Constitution, if the Vice President assumes the presidency due to a vacancy, this will only count as a full presidential term if there are at least two years remaining in the original term. If the President is temporarily unable to perform the duties of office, he must inform the Speaker of the People's Majlis in writing and transfer responsibilities to the Vice President. The President can resume office after informing the Speaker in writing. If the President cannot provide this notification due to incapacity, the Vice President, with the approval of a Cabinet majority, will take over the responsibilities. The Vice President will assume duties until the president is able to return and inform the Speaker in writing.

Following the establishment of the First Republic, Ibrahim Muhammad Didi was appointed Vice President through the 1952 referendum. However, the Republic did not last long, with the regime of Mohamed Amin Didi being overthrown by the people of Malé. Following the overthrow of the president, Vice President Ibrahim Muhammad Didi succeeded to the presidency. After six months, the Republic was abolished and restored to a monarchy, following the 1953 referendum. In 1968, a referendum was held to restore the country as a Republic. As stated in Article 45 of the Second Republic's 1968 Constitution, the President had the authority to appoint multiple Vice Presidents. President Ibrahim Nasir appointed five Vice Presidents: Abdul Sattar Moosa Didi, Ahmed Hilmy Didi, Ibrahim Shihab, Ali Maniku, and Hassan Zareer. However, when Nasir resigned and left the Maldives in 1978, none of them were in the post, as all of them had been given other positions. In the 2008 presidential election, held under the 2008 Constitution, the Maldives elected its first democratically and directly-elected President and Vice President, with Mohamed Waheed Hassan assuming the role of vice president. On 7 February 2012, following the resignation of President Mohamed Nasheed, Vice President Mohamed Waheed assumed the presidency, and appointed Mohamed Waheed Deen as his Vice President.

In 2015, Mohamed Jameel Ahmed, then Vice President of the Maldives, was impeached following a no-confidence vote submitted by the ruling party, the Progressive Party of Maldives. The motion accused him of incompetence, dereliction of duty, links with the opposition, failure to defend the government, and excessive expenditure from the state budget. As a result, Ahmed Adeeb was appointed as Vice President. However, Adeeb was also removed from office by a no-confidence vote from the People's Majlis, which alleged his involvement in a plot to assassinate President Abdulla Yameen in order to assume the presidency. Abdulla Jihad was then appointed as Vice President and served until the end of Yameen's presidential term. Faisal Naseem, serving under President Ibrahim Mohamed Solih from 2018 to 2023, became the only Vice President to complete a full term, and holds the record as the longest-serving Vice President.

The current Vice President is Hussain Mohamed Latheef, who assumed office on 17 November 2023.

== Vice Presidents ==
List of Vice Presidents of the Maldives
No.	Portrait	Name (Birth–Death)	Party	Term of office		President	Ref.
No.	Portrait	Name (Birth–Death)	Party	Took office	Left office	President	Ref.
1	Ibrahim Muhammad Didi, the first vice president of the Republic of Maldives.	Ibrahim Muhammad Didi (1902–1981)	Muthagaddim	1 January 1953	21 August 1953 (Note: Acting President after the death of Mohamed Amin Didi)	Mohamed Amin Didi	
2	Abdul Sattar Moosa Didi, the second vice president of the Maldives.	Abdul Sattar Moosa Didi (1936–2015)	Independent	10 March 1975 (Note: Ibrahim Nasir had five Vice Presidents.)	5 January 1977	Ibrahim Nasir	
3	Ibrahim Shihab, the fourth vice president of the Maldives.	Ibrahim Shihab (1922–1988)	Independent	12 March 1975	6 January 1977	Ibrahim Nasir	
4	Ahmed Hilmy Didi, the third vice president of the Maldives.	Ahmed Hilmy Didi (1917–1983)	Independent	27 March 1975	6 January 1977	Ibrahim Nasir	
5	Ali Maniku, the fifth vice president of the Maldives.	Ali Maniku (1935–2015)	Independent	16 July 1975	14 January 1977	Ibrahim Nasir	
6	Hassan Zareer, the sixth vice president of the Maldives.	Hassan Zareer (1935–2001)	Independent	7 June 1976	6 January 1977	Ibrahim Nasir	
7	Mohamed Waheed, the seventh vice president of the Maldives.	Mohamed Waheed Hassan (b. 1953)	Itthihad	11 November 2008	7 February 2012 (Note: Waheed became President after the mass protests which caused Mohamed Nasheed to resign.)	Mohamed Nasheed	
8	Mohamed Waheed Deen, the eighth vice president of the Maldives.	Mohamed Waheed Deen (b. 1947)	Independent	25 April 2012	10 November 2013	Mohamed Waheed Hassan	
9	Mohamed Jameel Ahmed, the ninth vice president of the Maldives.	Mohamed Jameel Ahmed (b. 1969)	Progressive	17 November 2013	21 July 2015 (Note: Impeached by the People's Majlis after a no confidence motion was filed against him)	Abdulla Yameen	
10	Ahmed Adeeb, the tenth vice president of the Maldives.	Ahmed Adeeb (b. 1982)	Progressive	22 July 2015	5 November 2015 (Note: Impeached by the People's Majlis after a no confidence motion was filed against him)	Abdulla Yameen	
11	Ahmed Jihad, the eleventh vice president of the Maldives.	Abdulla Jihad (b. 1964)	Progressive	22 June 2016	17 November 2018	Abdulla Yameen	
12	Faisal Naseem, the twelveth vice president of the Maldives.	Faisal Naseem (b. 1973)	Jumhooree	17 November 2018	17 November 2023	Ibrahim Mohamed Solih	
13	Hussain Mohamed Latheef, the thirteenth vice president of the Maldives.	Hussain Mohamed Latheef	Congress	17 November 2023	Incumbent	Mohamed Muizzu	

== See also ==
- History of the Maldives
- Politics of the Maldives
- List of Maldivian monarchs
- President of the Maldives
  - List of presidents of the Maldives
- Vice President of the Maldives
