= Second Lady of the Maldives =

Spouse of the vice president of the Maldives

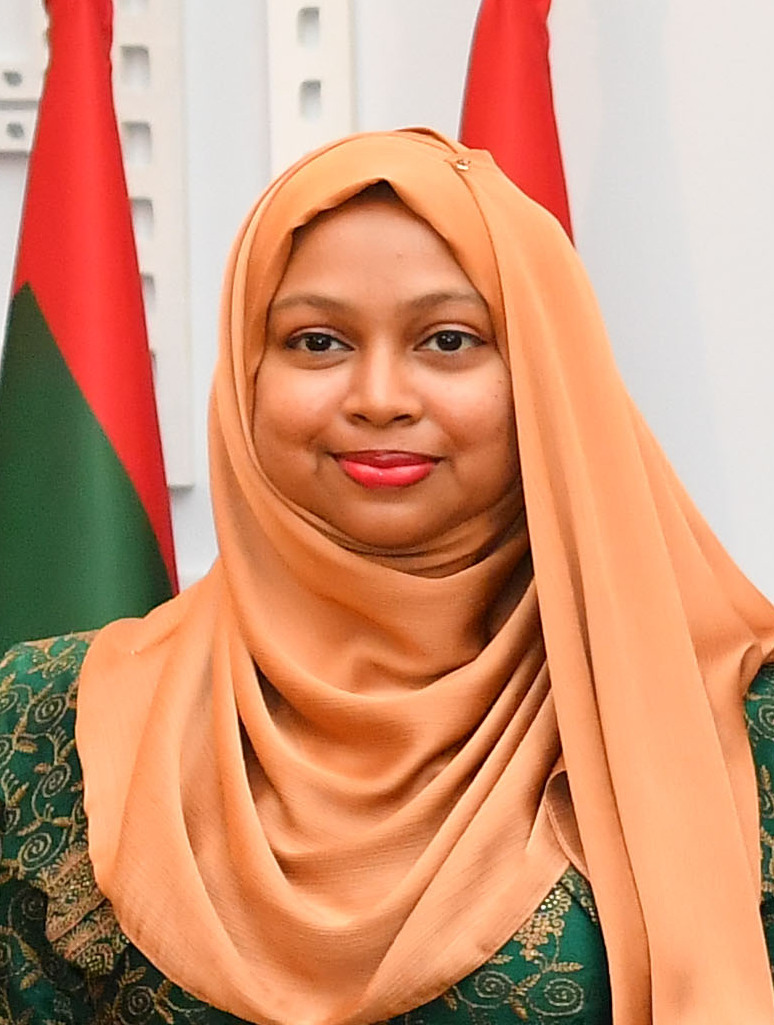
- Incumbent; Aishath Afreen since 17 November 2023
- Residence: Hilaaleege
- Term length: 5 years
- Formation: 11 November 1968; 57 years ago
- Website: presidency.gov.mv

Second Lady of the Maldives (Dhivehi: ދިވެހިރާއްޖޭގެ ރައީސުލްޖުމްހޫރިއްޔާގެ ނައިބުގެ އަނބިކަނބަލުން) is the title attributed to the wife of the vice president of the Maldives. The title of second lady is utilized by the government and official publications.

The country's current second lady is Aishath Afreen.

The Maldives was a sultanate from 1965 until 1968. The second republic of the Maldives was established in 1968 with the president as head of state. The position of second lady was established in 1968 with the establishment of the post-independence vice presidency.

== Second ladies of the Maldives ==
No.	Second Lady	Portrait	Tenure began	Tenure ended	Vice President	Notes
1	Unknown	–	1 January 1953	2 September 1953	Ibrahim Muhammad Didi	–
	Vacant; No Vice president during Velanagey Ibrahim's presidency					
2	Unknown	–	October 1975	May 1977	Abdul Sattar Moosa Didi	–
3	Mariyam Amin Didi	–	October 1975	May 1977	Ahmad Hilmy Didi	–
4	Aminath Didi	–	October 1975	May 1977	Ibrahim Shihab	–
5	Hafsa Hilmy	–	October 1975	May 1977	Ali Maniku	–
6	Fathimath Jameel	–	October 1975	May 1977	Hassan Zareer	–
	Vacant; No Vice president during Maumoon's presidency					
7	Ilham Hussain		11 November 2008	7 February 2012	Mohamed Waheed Hassan	Ilham is the first person in the Maldives to serve as both first and second lady, she became the first lady after President Nasheed resigned as she was the wife of his vice president.
8	Unknown	–	25 April 2012	10 November 2013	Mohamed Waheed Deen	–
9	Haulath Faheem	–	17 November 2013	22 July 2015	Mohamed Jameel Ahmed	–
10	Maryam Nashwa		22 July 2015	5 November 2015	Ahmed Adeeb	–
11	Asima Hussain		22 June 2016	17 November 2018	Abdulla Jihad	–
12	Aishath Shamsaadha		17 November 2018	17 November 2023	Faisal Naseem	–
13	Aishath Afreen		17 November 2023	Incumbent	Hussain Mohamed Latheef	–
