= Presidency of Abdulla Yameen =

Maldivian presidential administration from 2013–2018

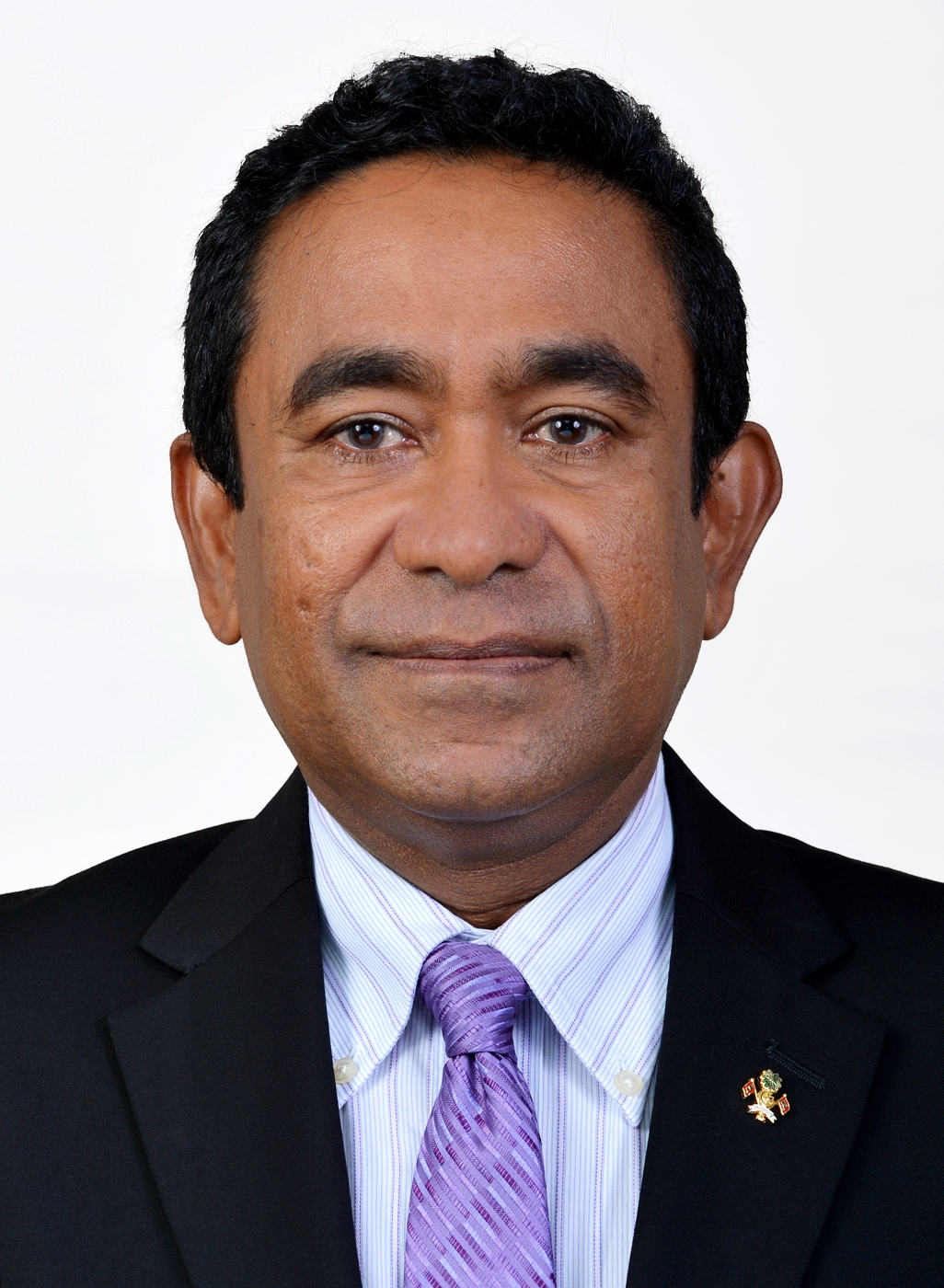
- Presidency of Abdulla Yameen; 17 November 2013 – 17 November 2018
- President: Abdulla Yameen
- Vice President: Mohamed Jameel Ahmed (2013–2015); Ahmed Adeeb (2015); Abdulla Jihad (2016–2018)
- Cabinet: Cabinet of Abdulla Yameen
- Party: Progressive Party of Maldives
- Election: 2013
- Seat: The President's Office
- Seal of the President of the Maldives

Abdulla Yameen Abdul Gayoom's tenure as the 6th President of the Maldives began on 17 November 2013 after he won the 2013 Maldivian presidential election against then-President Mohamed Waheed Hassan and ended on 17 November 2018 after he lost to Ibrahim Mohamed Solih in the 2018 Maldivian presidential election.

During Yameen's presidency, there have been major infrastructure projects as well as alleged human rights infringements.

== 2013 elections ==
Progressive Party of Maldives (PPM) elected Abdulla Yameen as their candidate for the 2013 election, which had gone through many delays. He received 61,278 votes in the first round and 111,203 in the second round, becoming the new president.

== Presidency ==
Abdulla Yameen's presidency started off strong as in 2015, the China-Maldives Friendship Bridge (Sinamalé Bridge) started being built and was inaugurated in August 2018.

The Hulhumalé district was also being renovated by Yameen and land reclamation started for the new Phase II section. Yameen also started a new housing flat scheme called "Hiyaa" to provide sheltering for 100,000 people.

Yameen along with then-Housing Minister Mohamed Muizzu constructed a tertiary hospital in Addu City to ensure better healthcare.

Yameen also built a skyscraper hospital, named Dharumavantha Hospital, having 25 story's.

It was revealed in an investigation titled "Stealing Paradise" by Al Jazeera, it was revealed that senior government officials including Yameen's then-VP Ahmed Adeeb Abdul Ghafoor was stealing funds from MMPRC. It also led to the conviction of Yameen after his presidency ended in 2018.

=== Assassination attempt ===
In September 2015, an explosion took place on Yameen's presidential yacht 'Finifenmaa' which was carrying Yameen, Fathimath Ibrahim, top government officials from Hulhulé. The explosion injured his wife, a presidential aide, and a bodyguard.

=== Allegations of violating Human Rights ===
In 2014, Ahmed Rilwan, a journalist and reporter, was kidnapped by a group of religious extremists and was beheaded and dropped off a boat into the water. It's believed that people working in the government were involved including then-VP Adeeb.

In 2016, the Maldives left the Commonwealth of Nations after alleged human rights abuses where the government said that they were treated "unjustly and unfairly."

In 2017, Yameen Rasheed, a blogger known for his satirical commentaries on Maldivian politicians and religious extremists was found dead with 34 stab wounds, he previously received death threats but the police did nothing.

=== State of emergency ===
Abdulla Yameen declared a State of emergency where Police forces detained and arrested high-profile politicians and judges such as, Maumoon Abdul Gayoom, Chief Justice Abdulla Saeed, Ali Hameed Mohamed. Police forces also broke into the Supreme Court.
