= Hilaaleege =

Official residence of the vice president of the Maldives

- ހިލާލީގެ
- Interactive map of the Hilaaleege area

General information
- Type: Official Residence
- Location: Fiyaathoshi Magu, Malé, Maldives
- Coordinates: 4°10′42″N 73°30′29″E
- Current tenants: Vice President of the Maldives, Second Lady of the Maldives and the Second family
- Inaugurated: 1968
- Owner: Government of the Maldives.

Hilaaleege is the official residence of the Vice President of the Maldives.

== History ==
Hilaaleege was formerly the Presidential Palace of Ibrahim Nasir but it was seized by the state in 1981 under the presidency of Maumoon Abdul Gayoom after Nasir was sentenced for corruption. During the presidency of Mohamed Nasheed, Hilaaleege was established as the official residence of the Vice President.

== Usage of building ==
Title	Duration	President	Tenant	Notes
Presidential Palace	1968–1978	Ibrahim Nasir	Ibrahim Nasir	
Hilaaleege	1978–2008	Maumoon Abdul Gayoom	Maumoon Abdul Gayoom	Used to accommodate foreign dignitaries that came to visit Maldives.
Official residence of the Vice President	2008–2013	Mohamed Nasheed	Mohamed Waheed Hassan	Changed to accommodate Vice President.
Official Residence of VP	2013–2015	Abdulla Yameen	Mohamed Jameel Ahmed	Yameen's VP, Jameel lived in Hilaaleege before being impeached.
Presidential Palace	2015–2018	Abdulla Yameen	Abdulla Yameen	After Yameen's VP, Jameel, got impeached, Yameen moved to Hilaaleege and used Muliaage for political work.
Official Residence of Vice President	2018–Present	Ibrahim Mohamed Solih Mohamed Muizzu	Faisal Naseem (2018–2023) Hussain Mohamed Latheef (2024–Present)	There were extensive repairs being done to Hilaaleege and VP Hussain Mohamed Latheef moved in after they were completed.
