= Aishath Afreen =

Second Lady of the Maldives since 2023

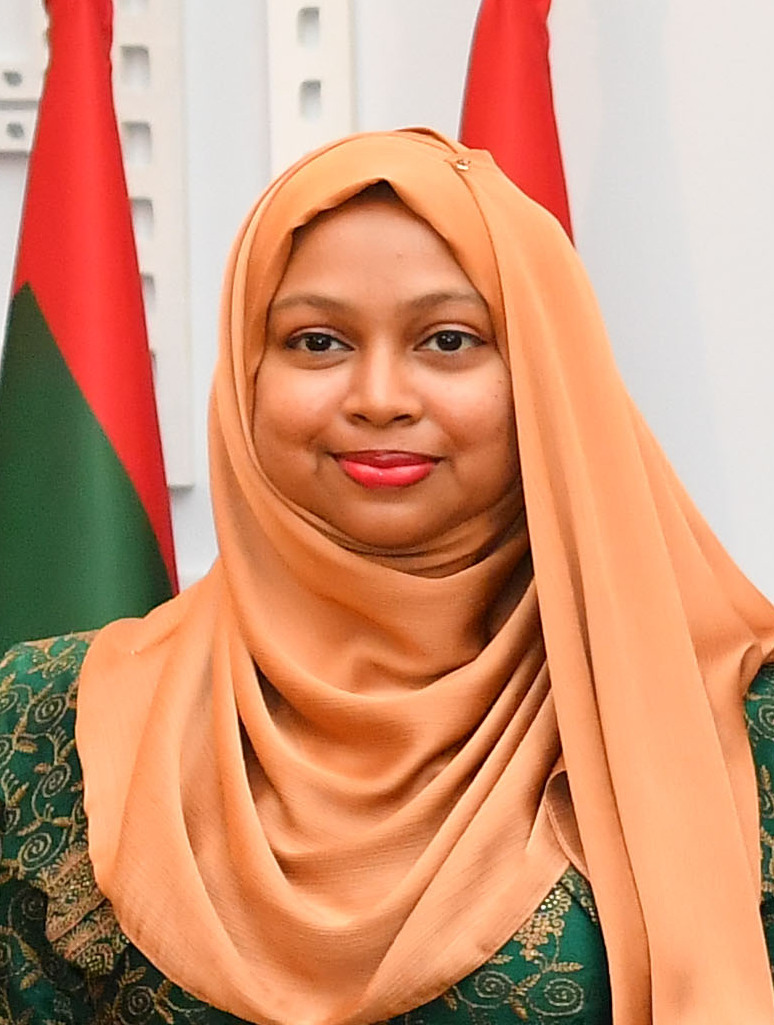
- Afreen in 2023
- Born: Aishath Afreen Mohamed; 1984 or 1985 (age 40–41); Malé, Maldives
- Occupation: Human rights commissioner
- Years active: 2015–2020
- Known for: Spouse of the vice president of the Maldives (2023–present)
- Spouse: Hussain Mohamed Latheef
- Children: 2

Aishath Afreen Mohamed (born 1984 or 1985) is a Maldivian public figure and former human rights worker, who is the spouse of the vice president of the Maldives since November 2024, as the wife of vice president Hussain Mohamed Latheef.

== Career ==
On 11 August 2015, Afreen was approved by the People's Majlis to serve as a commissioner of Human Rights Commission of the Maldives for a 5–year term. She was then appointed to serve the post, by then–president Abdulla Yameen and was sworn in on 17 August. Along with other members, her oath of office were administered by chief justice Abdulla Saeed. Following the end of her term as commissioner, she resigned on 12 July 2020.

== Second Lady ==
Afreen became the second lady of the Maldives on 17 November 2023. As second lady, Afreen has been a prominent figure, participating in various activities including officiating ceremonies and delivering speeches.

== Personal life ==
Aishath Afreen is married to Hussain Mohamed Latheef, vice president of the Maldives. They have a daughter.
