= Gaumee Itthihaad =

2008–2013 political party in the Maldives

Gaumee Itthihaad National Unity Party ޤައުމީ އިއްތިހާދު
- Abbreviation: GIP
- Leader: Mohamed Waheed Hassan
- Secretary-General: Topy – Ahmed Thaufeeq
- Founded: August 2008
- Dissolved: 2013
- Merged into: Progressive Party of Maldives
- Headquarters: 1st Floor; Ma. Eureka; Raiydhibay Hingun; Male', Maldives
- Ideology: Social democracy Environmentalism
- Political position: Centre-left
- Colours: Green, white

Website
- www.gip.org.mv

Gaumee Itthihaad (English: National Unity Party, GIP) was a political party in the Maldives headed by Dr. Mohamed Waheed Hassan Manik, former President of Maldives, and the first Vice-President of Maldives. The party was generally pragmatic, and was part of the coalition including the former ruling party for the Republic of Maldives. Under the coalition agreement with the Maldivian Democratic Party, the GIP were awarded three seats in the cabinet; the Fisheries Ministry, the Education Ministry, and the Ministry for Economic Development and Trade, although these positions were revoked by the then-President in contravention of the coalition agreement.

The party was dissolved in 2013.

After the dissolution, the leaders of the party, Dr. Waheed, Ahmed Thaufeeq, Abdulla Nazeer, Masood Imad, Hussain Shihab, Dr. Mohamed Ali, and Ilyas Hussain Ibrahim, Adnaan Ali and Jaufar Easa Adam signed for the Progressive Party of Maldives.

== See also ==
- The Republic of Maldives
- Mohamed Nasheed
