= Ilham Hussain =

First Lady of the Maldives from 2012 to 2013

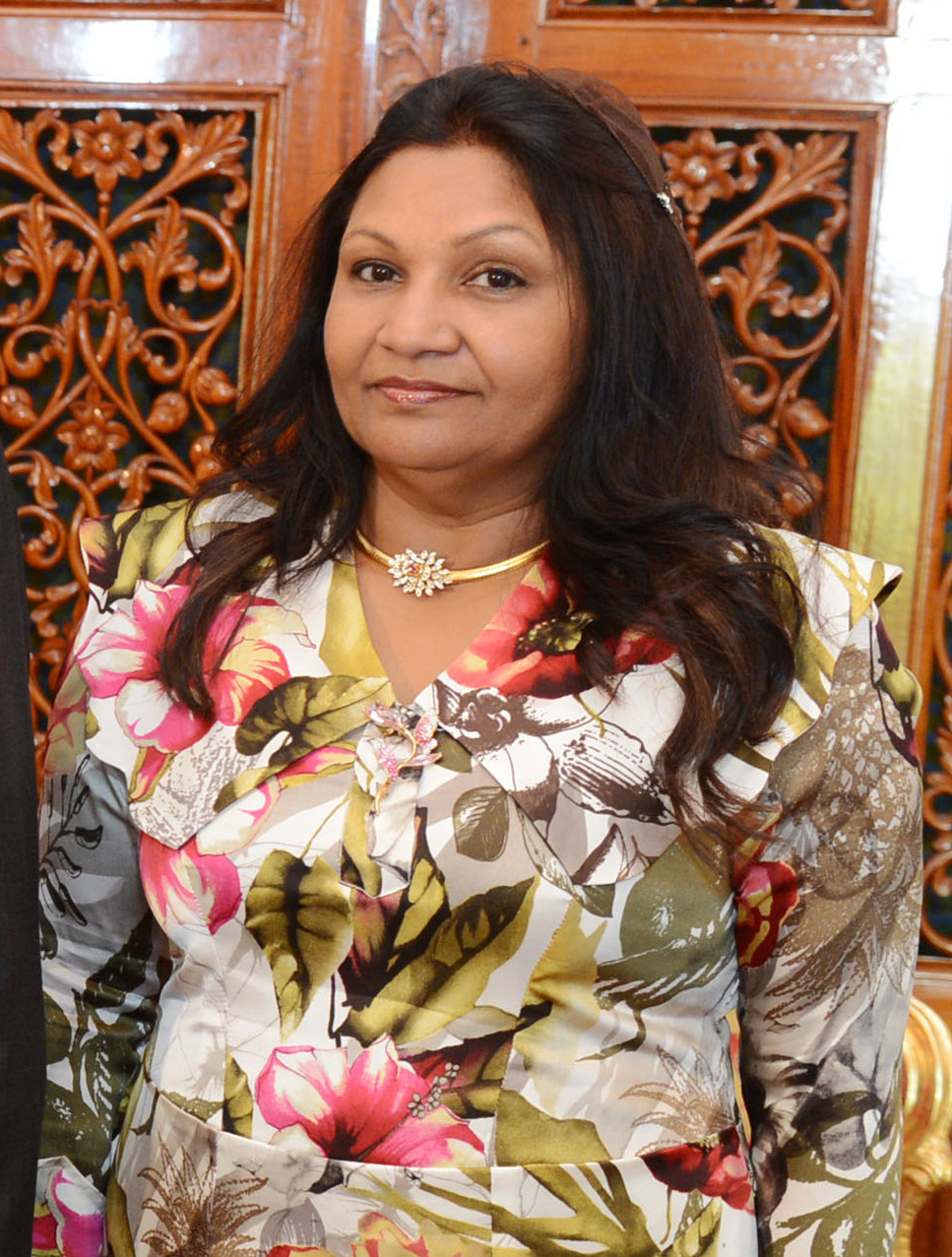

6th First Lady of the Maldives
- In role February 7, 2012 – November 17, 2013
- President: Mohamed Waheed Hassan
- Preceded by: Laila Ali Abdulla
- Succeeded by: Fathimath Ibrahim

7th Second Lady of the Maldives
- In role November 11, 2008 – February 7, 2012
- President: Mohamed Nasheed

Personal details
- Born: May 23, 1955 (age 70) Malé, Maldives
- Spouse: Mohamed Waheed Hassan
- Children: Widhadh Waheed; Fidha Waheed; Salim Waheed

Ilham Hussain (born May 23, 1955) is a Maldivian health advocate, public figure, and politician who served as the First Lady of the Maldives from 2012 until 2013 during the tenure of President Mohamed Waheed Hassan. She also served as the Second Lady of the Maldives from 2008 to 2012. She is now the head of the Maldives Autism Association.
