= 2015 Finifenmaa boat explosion =

Explosion of presidential speedboat in Maldives

- Location of the attack in Malé
- Location: 4°10′46.6352″N 73°30′40.7844″E; Izzudheen Faalan, Henveiru, Malé, Maldives
- Date: 28 September 2015
- Target: Abdulla Yameen
- Attack type: Bombing
- Weapon: Improvised explosive device
- Deaths: 0
- Injuries: 3
- Accused: 7
- Charges: Ahmed Adeeb: Treason, terrorism, and abuse of authority; Hassan Rikaz: Terrorism; Ahmed Amir: Terrorism; Ahmed Fayaz: Obstructing justice and law enforcement officers; Ahmed Thiham: Obstructing justice; Moosa Zameer: Obstructing justice
- Verdict: Ahmed Fayaz: Nulled; Moosa Zameer: Guilty (4 months and 24 days); Ahmed Thiham: Guilty (4 months and 24 days); Ahmed Adeeb: Overturned
- Convictions: Thiham: Obstructing justice; Zameer: Obstructing justice
- Convicted: 2

On 28 September 2015, an explosion occurred on the Maldivian presidential speedboat 'Finifenmaa', which was carrying President Abdulla Yameen, First Lady Fathimath Ibrahim, and other government officials from his administration. The boat was carrying them from Hulhulé to the Izzuddeen Faalan (presidential jetty) in Malé. Yameen escaped unhurt but first lady Fathimath Ibrahim, a presidential aide, and a bodyguard was injured. This explosion was labelled as an assassination attempt on Yameen but has been widely disputed.

== Explosion and casualties ==
As the boat was nearing to dock at the Izzuddeen Faalan, a loud explosion occurred on the boat. The explosion caused the speedboat's housing to fall in, and the door to break off. First Lady Fathimath Ibrahim, a presidential aide, and Yameen's bodyguard were injured during the explosion and underwent treatment at Indira Gandhi Memorial Hospital. Ibrahim suffered minor bone fractures and remained hospitalized. She was released from the hospital a month after the incident along with the presidential aide and bodyguard.

== Investigation ==
On 28 September 2016, Mohamed Hussain Shareef told reporters in Colombo that the probable cause of the blast was a mechanical issue. On the same day, Yameen called for the Federal Bureau of Investigation (FBI) and the Australian Federal Police for assistance regarding the case.

A day after, an FBI agent and a team of Saudi Arabian forensic experts arrived in the Maldives. A team of forensic experts from the Western Australia Police Force and from India and Sri Lanka also came to investigate. They all left a week later, their findings not being made public. An "advisory committee" was formed by Yameen, later turning into an inquiry committee into the explosion. The committee was being led by Yameen and Home Minister Umar Naseer.

Raajje TV cited an anonymous source which said that the explosion was caused due to the pressure accumulating in the boat's air conditioning.

In October, Ahmed Thiham, Moosa Zameer, and Mohamed Jawaz from the Maldives National Defence Force (MNDF) were arrested in connection to the incident.

Shareef told Reuters that the blast was an assassination attempt and a press conference was called by the President's Office where the president’s spokesman also called it an assassination attempt.

Colonel Ahmed Fayaz was transferred from the head of the Special Protection Group to Malé Area Command and was being held at Bandaara Koshi (MNDF headquarters).

Vice President Ahmed Adeeb Abdul Ghafoor was arrested at Ibrahim Nasir International Airport in connection to the explosion and was placed under police custody. Ghafoor was later taken to Dhoonidhoo's detention center. Yameen called Ghafoor a threat to national security and accused him of using his influence within the Maldives Police Service to destroy evidence of the boat explosion. Ghafoor was later charged with treason.

Forensic experts from Saudi Arabia found traces of RDX on the Finifenmaa boat. Meanwhile a day later, the FBI said that there is no evidence that the explosion was a bomb.

In December, Fayaz's lawyer challenged his administrative detention at the military headquarters and sought an order declaring his detention illegal and arbitrary.

Ghafoor's lawyers claimed that he was no longer being held in custody due to the boat explosion, which the police later denied.

In January 2016, Ghafoor's bodyguard was arrested in connection to the boat explosion.

In March, Ghafoor and his bodyguards, Hassan Rikaz and Ahmed Amir, were charged with terrorism and Ghafoor was additionally charged with abuse of authority. Fayaz was charged obstructing justice and law enforcement officers, Thiham and Zameer were charged with obstructing justice.

Rikaz and Amir pleaded not guilty along with three other soldiers during the first trial.

In May, evidence was submitted to the Criminal Court to prove Ghafoor planned to flee after the boat blast.

In June, Fayaz was sentenced two years along with additional three months and eighteen days on a charge of obstructing law enforcement officers, Zameer and Thiham were sentenced to four months and twenty four days. Zameer and Thiham were later released. Jawaz was given immunity and witness protection by the Prosecutor General's Office after he testified saying he made two bombs for Ghafoor.

In May 2019, the High Court overturned the Criminal Court's 15 year sentence against Ghafoor and ordered retrial.

In July, the High Court nullified the charges against Fayaz.

== See also ==
- Maldivian presidential assassination attempts
