= President of the Maldives =

Head of state and government

- ދިވެހިރާއްޖޭގެ ރައީސުލްޖުމްހޫރިއްޔާ
- Presidential seal

- Presidential flag

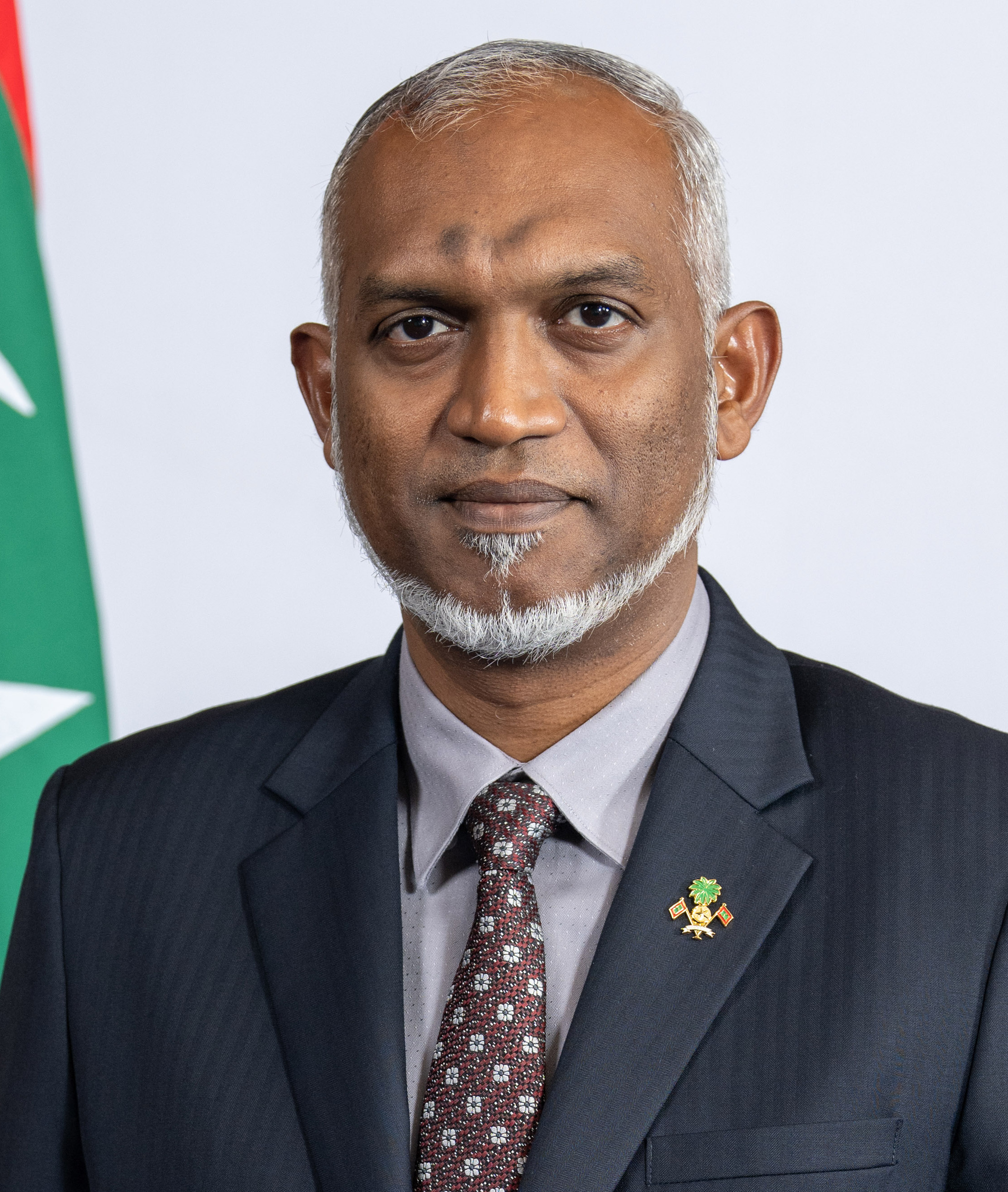
- Incumbent; Mohamed Muizzu since 17 November 2023
- Executive branch of the Maldivian Government
- Style: His Excellency
- Type: Head of state; Head of government; Commander-in-chief
- Member of: Cabinet
- Residence: Muliaage
- Seat: The President's Office
- Appointer: Direct Popular vote (2008-present)
- Term length: Five years, renewable once
- Constituting instrument: Constitution of the Maldives (1932)
- Formation: 1 January 1953; 73 years ago (First Republic); 11 November 1968; 58 years ago (Second Republic)
- First holder: Mohamed Amin Didi (Note: Amin is the First president of the First republic. When the second republic was established, prime minister Ibrahim Nasir became the president, and is considered the 2nd president.)
- Deputy: Vice-President
- Salary: MVR 120,000/US$7,818 monthly ($93,816 yearly)
- Website: presidency.gov.mv

The president of the Republic of Maldives (Dhivehi: ދިވެހިރާއްޖޭގެ ރައީސުލްޖުމްހޫރިއްޔާ, romanized: Dhivehi Raajjeyge Raeesuljumhooriyyaa) is the head of state and head of government of the Maldives, and the commander-in-chief of the country's armed forces, the Maldives National Defence Force. Under the Constitution of the Maldives, the president is vested with executive power and must exercise it in accordance with the Constitution.

The president is directly elected by universal and secret suffrage for a five-year term. The voting system used for presidential elections is a two-round majority system. Consequently, a candidate must receive more than 50 percent of the vote to be elected; if no candidate obtains the required majority, a run-off election is held. No person elected to the office of the president may serve more than two terms, consecutive or otherwise. Each presidential candidate contests the election with a vice-presidential running mate.

The office of the presidency was first instituted in 1953, following a constitutional referendum in which the Maldives briefly transitioned from a monarchy to a republic, with Mohamed Amin Didi serving as the nation's first elected president. The monarchy was subsequently restored in 1954, before again being abolished following a second constitutional referendum in 1968. The present republican system dates from 11 November 1968, when Ibrahim Nasir became the first president of the Second Republic.

The current president is Mohamed Muizzu, who assumed office on 17 November 2023 after defeating the incumbent president Ibrahim Mohamed Solih in the 2023 Maldivian presidential election. Muizzu received 54.04 per cent of the valid votes in the second round of the election.

== History ==
=== Sultanate and First Republic ===
The first written constitution of the Maldives was brought into effect in 1932 by Sultan Muhammad Shamsuddeen III. This constitution was written on the advice on the then-acting governor of Ceylon, Bernard H. Bourdill in 1930.

Soon afterwards in 1934, a second constitution was written and brought into effect.

A third constitution was written and brought into effect under the rule of Sultan Hassan Nooraddeen II. On 30 January 1940, the constitutional system was deemed unnecessary and was abolished, only to be reinstated in 1942 (5th constitution). After another constitutional change in 1951, the Maldives was declared a republic in 1953.

Under the rule of President Mohamed Ameen Didi, a new constitution (7th) was brought into effect. This constitution lasted only 8 months, when the republic was abolished and the country went back to a sultanate, under the rule of Sultan Muhammad Fareed Didi. This change introduced yet another constitution brought to effect on 7 March 1954. This was followed by a 9th constitution in 1964 and another in 1967.

=== Second Republic ===
After the second republic was declared, new president Ibrahim Nasir ratified a new constitution on 11 November 1968. This constitution was amended thrice; in 1970, 1972 and 1975 respectively.

President Maumoon Abdul Gayyoom introduced a 12th constitution in 1998. The government proclaimed that this change was to encourage the people of the country to live in friendship, amity and co-operation; to encourage good deeds and respect among one another; to be just; and to live in equality and fraternity.

=== 2008 Constitutional Reforms ===
Political and constitutional reforms during the 2000s culminated in the ceremonial ratification of a new constitution on 7 August 2008.

Calls for political reform intensified in the early 2000s, particularly following civil unrest in Malé in September 2003 after the death of a detainee in prison. In 2004, President Maumoon announced a programme of political and constitutional reform that included the preparation of a new constitution, the expansion of democratic freedoms, the introduction of a directly elected presidency and a clearer separation of powers between the executive, legislature and judiciary.

A People's Special Majlis, functioning as a constitutional assembly, was convened in 2004 to draft the new constitution. Its membership included members of the existing People's Majlis, members appointed by the president, together with additional representatives elected for the constitutional process. The drafting process proved lengthy and politically contentious, with disagreements between government supporters and the emerging opposition over the distribution of state power, the independence of institutions and the form of government to be adopted. Political parties were formally permitted to register in 2005, allowing the constitutional negotiations increasingly to take place within a multiparty political environment.

One of the principal disagreements concerned whether the Maldives should retain a presidential system or adopt a parliamentary system. The question was submitted to a constitutional referendum on 18 August 2007, in which more than 60 per cent of voters supported retaining a presidential system. The result provided the Special Majlis with the basis on which to continue drafting the new Constitution.

The constitutional process nevertheless continued to experience delays and political disputes. The Special Majlis ultimately finalised the proposed Constitution at the end of June 2008 and submitted it to the president for ceremonial ratification. After seeking clarification from the assembly on several provisions, Maumoon ratified the new Constitution on 7 August 2008, replacing the Constitution of 1998. The current constitution is known by its short title, "Constitution of the Maldives, 2008".

The new Constitution substantially altered the institutional framework of the state. It provided for a clearer separation of powers, strengthened the legislative authority of the People's Majlis, established an expanded constitutional bill of rights and provided for an independent judiciary and a number of independent state institutions. It also introduced direct, multiparty presidential elections, reduced the voting age from 21 to 18, and limited a president elected under the new Constitution to two five-year terms.

The Constitution also required the first presidential election under the new system to be held in 2008. Six candidates contested the first round on 8 October, marking the country's first competitive multiparty presidential election. As no candidate obtained an absolute majority, a run-off was held later that month between Maumoon and Mohamed Nasheed, which Nasheed won.

== Elections ==
The Maldives elects a head of state, the president, and a legislature. The president is elected directly for a five-year term by the Maldivian people.

The Assembly (Majlis) has 93 members. All members are elected directly for a term of five years from 93 single-member constituencies.

=== British military presence and Suvadive secession ===
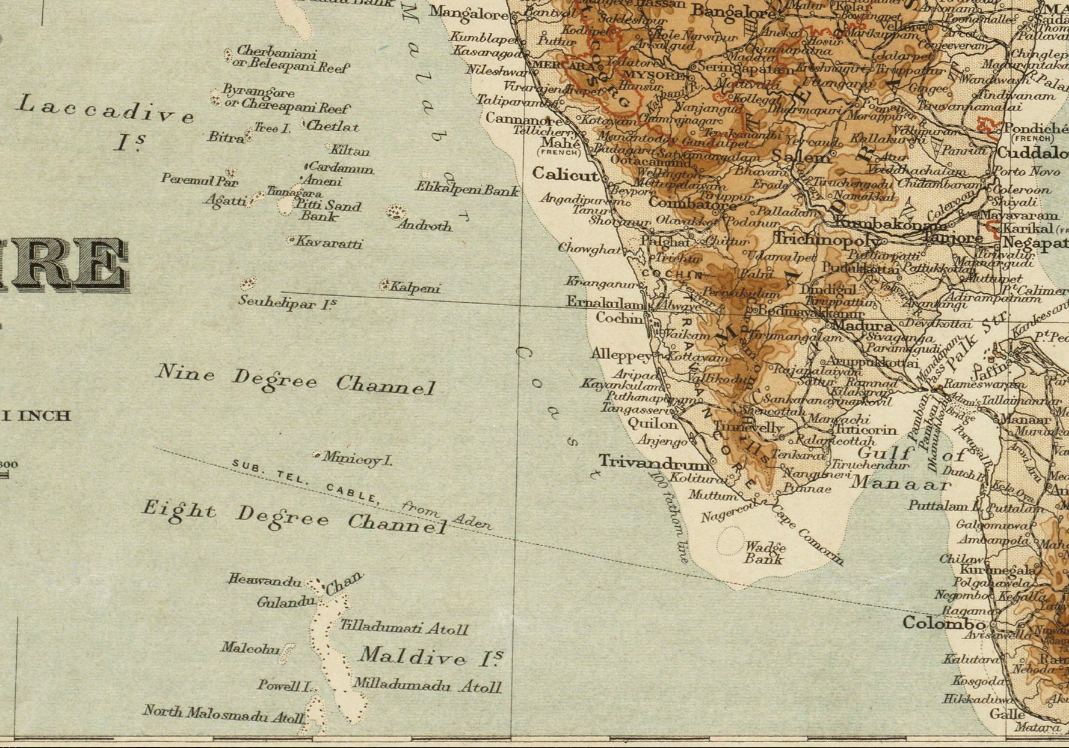
1920 British map of the Maldives

Beginning in the 1950s, The United Kingdom obtained permission to reestablish its wartime RAF Gan airfield in the southernmost Addu Atoll, employing hundreds of locals. Maldives granted the British a 100-year lease on Gan that required them to pay £2,000 a year, as well as some 440,000 square metres on Hithadhoo for radio installations. This served as a staging post for British military flights to the Far East and Australia, replacing RAF Mauripur in Pakistan which had been relinquished in 1956.

However, in 1957 the new prime minister, Ibrahim Nasir, called for a review of the agreement in the interest of shortening the lease and increasing the annual payment, and announced a new tax on boats. Nasir was challenged in 1959 by a local secessionist movement in the three southernmost atolls that benefited economically from the British presence on Gan. This group cut ties with the Maldives government and formed an independent state, the United Suvadive Republic with Abdullah Afeef as president and Hithadhoo as capital. The short-lived state (1959–63) had a combined population of 20,000 inhabitants scattered over Huvadu, Addu and Fua Mulaku. Afeef pleaded for support and recognition from Britain.

While the British initially showed lukewarm support for the small breakaway nation, they withdrew it in 1961, when they signed a treaty with the Maldive Islands without involving Afeef. Following that treaty, the Suvadives had to endure an economic embargo. In 1962, Nasir sent gunboats from Malé with government police on board to eliminate elements opposed to his rule. One year later the Suvadive republic was scrapped and Abdullah Afeef went into exile to the Seychelles, where he died in 1993.

Meanwhile, in 1960 the Maldives had allowed the United Kingdom to continue to use both the Gan and the Hitaddu facilities for a thirty-year period, with the payment of £750,000 over the period of 1960 to 1965 for the purpose of Maldives' economic development.

Coat of arms of the secessionist United Suvadive Republic

The base was closed in 1976 as part of the larger British withdrawal of permanently stationed forces 'East of Suez' initiated by the Labour government of Harold Wilson.

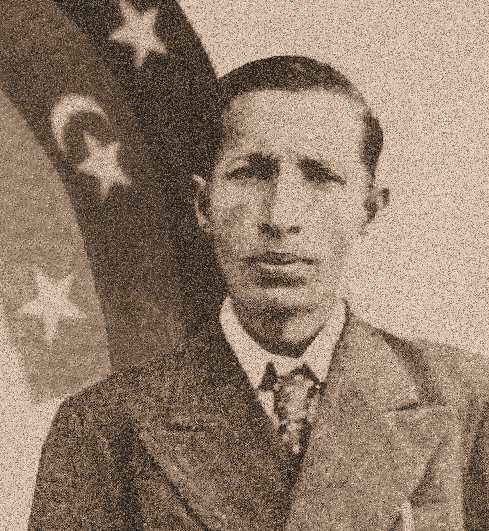
Abdullah Afeef, leader of the secessionist United Suvadive Republic (1959–1963)

== Independence ==
On 26 July 1965, the Maldives gained independence under an agreement signed with the United Kingdom. The independent monarchy of the Maldives declined to join the Commonwealth.

The British government retained the use of the Gan and Hitaddu facilities. In a national referendum in March 1968, Maldivians abolished the sultanate and established a republic, which was declared on 11 November 1968.

In line with the broader British policy of decolonisation on 26 July 1965 an agreement was signed on behalf of His Majesty the Sultan by prime minister Ibrahim Nasir Rannabandeyri Kilegefan, and on behalf of Queen Elizabeth II by Sir Michael Walker, British Ambassador designate to the Maldive Islands. The agreement ended British responsibility for the defence and external affairs of the Maldives, thus granting the islands full political independence. The ceremony took place at the British High Commissioner's Residence in Colombo. After this, the sultanate continued for another three years under Muhammad Fareed Didi, who declared himself King rather than Sultan.

On 15 November 1967, a vote was taken in parliament to decide whether the Maldives should continue as a constitutional monarchy or become a republic. Forty of 44 members of parliament voted in favour of becoming a republic. On 15 March 1968, the question was put to a national referendum, with 81.23% voting in favour of establishing a republic. The declaration of the republic on 11 November 1968 ended the 853-year-old monarchy, which was replaced by the presidency of former prime minister Ibrahim Nasir. As the King had held little real power, this was seen as a cosmetic change and required few alterations in the structures of government.

=== Nasir presidency ===
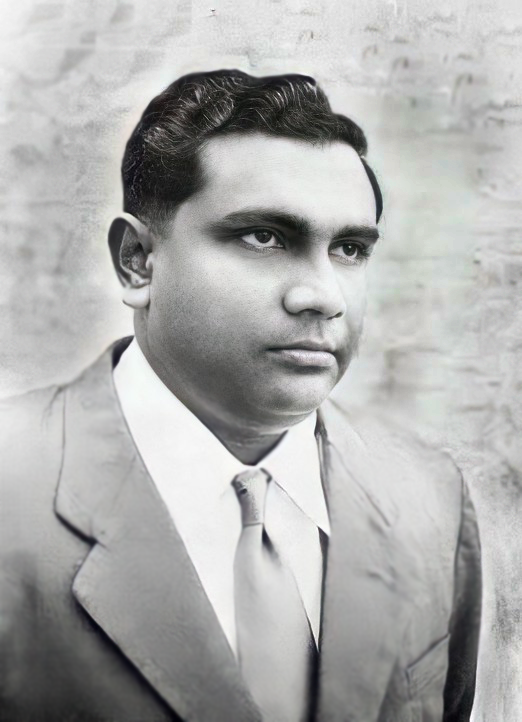
Ibrahim Nasir, President of the Maldives (1968–1978)

The Second Republic was proclaimed in November 1968 under the presidency of Ibrahim Nasir, who had increasingly dominated the political scene. Under the new constitution, Nasir was elected indirectly to a four-year presidential term by the Majlis (legislature), and his candidacy later ratified by referendum. He appointed Ahmed Zaki as the new prime minister.

In 1973, Nasir was elected to a second term under the constitution as amended in 1972, which extended the presidential term to five years and which also provided for the election of the prime minister by the Majlis. In March 1975, newly elected prime minister Zaki was arrested in a bloodless coup and was banished to a remote atoll. Observers suggested that Zaki was becoming too popular and hence posed a threat to the Nasir faction.

During the 1970s, the economic situation in the Maldives suffered a setback when the Sri Lankan market for Maldives' main export of dried fish collapsed. Adding to the problems was the British decision in 1975 to close its airfield on Gan. A steep commercial decline followed the evacuation of Gan in March 1976. As a result, the popularity of Nasir's government suffered. Maldives' 20-year period of authoritarian rule under Nasir abruptly ended in 1978 when he fled to Singapore. A subsequent investigation claimed that he had absconded with millions of dollars from the state treasury. However, the investigation produced no concrete evidence of this, resulting in the belief that the claim was fabricated by the new government to gain support from the citizens.

Nasir was widely credited with modernising the long-isolated and nearly unknown nation and opening it up to the rest of the world, including by building the first international airport in the Maldives (Malé International Airport, 1966) and gaining United Nations membership. He laid the foundations of the nation by modernising the fisheries industry with mechanised vessels and starting the tourism industry – the two prime drivers of today's Maldivian economy.

He was credited with many other improvements such as introducing an English-based modern curriculum to government-run schools and granting women the right to vote in 1964. He brought television and radio to the country with formation of Television Maldives and Radio Maldives. He also abolished Vaaru, a tax on the people living on islands outside Malé.

Tourism in the Maldives began to be developed by the beginning of the 1970s. The first resort in the Maldives was Kurumba Maldives which welcomed the first guests on 3 October 1972. The first accurate census was held in December 1977 and showed 142,832 persons residing in the country.

Nasir was criticised for his authoritarian methods against opponents, including for his severe handling of an insurrection by the Addu islanders who formed a short-lived breakaway government – United Suvadives Republic – with closer ties to the British.

Nasir's hasty introduction of the Latin alphabet (Malé Latin) in 1976 instead of local Thaana script – reportedly to allow for the use of telex machines in the local administration – was widely criticised. Clarence Maloney, a Maldives-based US anthropologist, lamented the inconsistencies of the "Dhivehi Latin" which ignored all previous linguistic research on the Maldivian language and did not follow the modern Standard Indic transliteration. At the time of the romanisation every island's officials were required to use only the Latin script, and they became illiterate overnight.

Officials were relieved when the Tāna script was reinstated by President Gayoom shortly after he took power in 1978. However, Malé Latin continues to be widely used.

=== Maumoon presidency ===
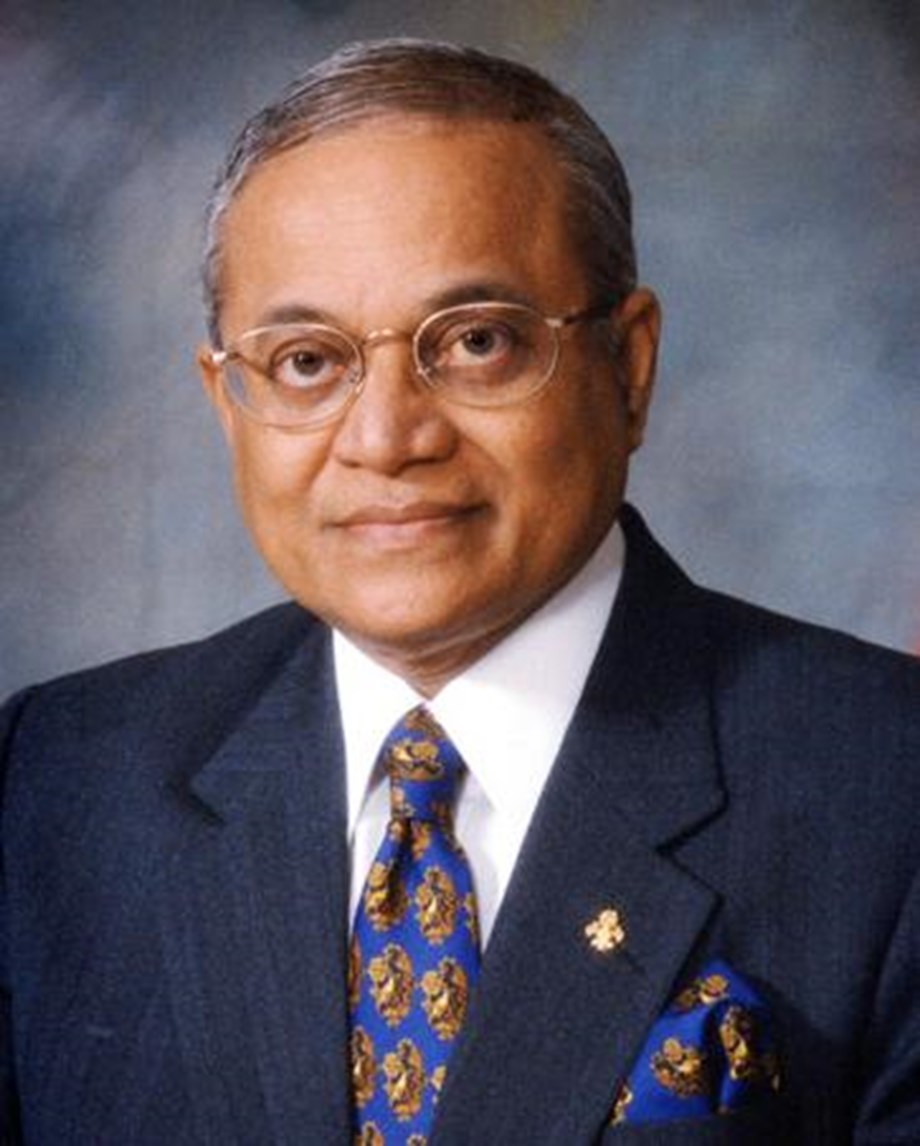
Maumoon Abdul Gayoom, President of the Maldives (1978–2008)

As Ibrahim Nasir's second term was coming to an end, he decided not to seek re-election and, in June 1978, the Majlis was called upon to nominate a presidential candidate. Nasir received 45 votes (despite his stated intention not to seek re-election), with the remaining 3 votes for Maumoon Abdul Gayoom, a former university lecturer and Maldivian ambassador to the United Nations. Another ballot was called on 16 June. Maumoon received 27 votes, allowing his name to be put forward as the sole candidate. Five months later, he was elected the new President of the Maldives, with 92.96% of the votes (he would be later re-elected five times as the sole candidate). The peaceful election was seen as ushering in a period of political stability and economic development in view of Maumoon's priority to develop the poorer islands. In 1978, Maldives joined the International Monetary Fund and the World Bank. Tourism also gained in importance to the local economy, reaching more than 120,000 visitors in 1985. The local populace appeared to benefit from increased tourism and the corresponding increase in foreign contacts involving various development projects.

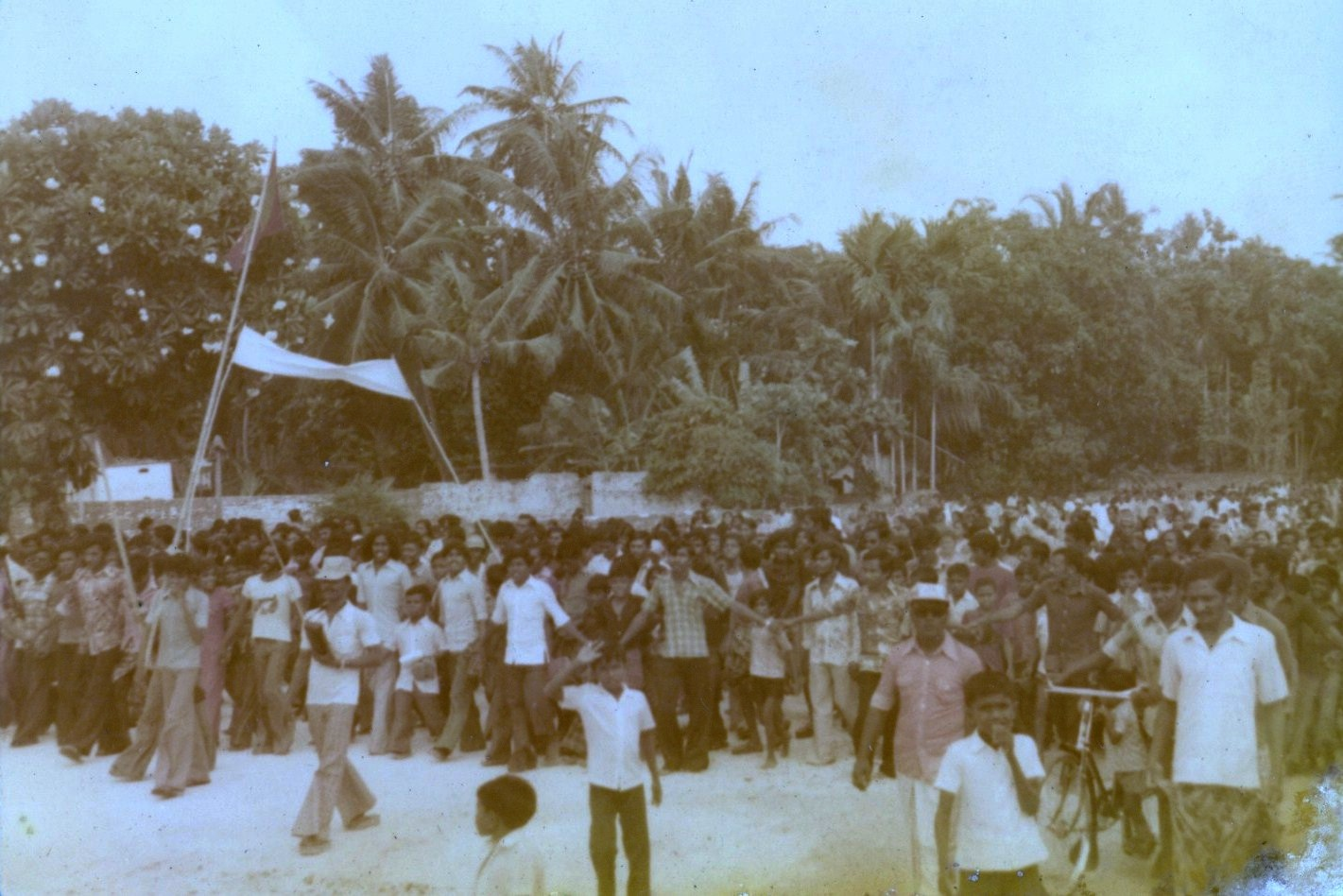
A demonstration (Muzhaahira) in Fua Mulaku in support of the government, 1981.

In July 1982, the Maldives joined the Commonwealth of Nations as a special member, then as a full member in 1985.

There were three attempts by Nasir supporters and business interests to overthrow Maumoon's government during the 1980s: in 1980, 1983 and 1988.

Whereas the 1980 and 1983 coup attempts against Maumoon's presidency were not considered serious, the third coup attempt in November 1988 alarmed the international community. About 80 armed mercenaries of the PLOTE Tamil militant group landed in the capital city of Malé before dawn aboard used cargo vessels. However, they took almost 2 days to arrive in Malé and failed to capture it. The plan was ill-prepared and by noon the PLOTE militants and the Maldivian allies fled the country realising they had already lost. Soon after the militants had left, the Indian Military arrived on the request of President Gayoom, and their gunships gave chase to the PLOTE militants' getaway vessels. Nineteen people died in the fighting, and several taken hostage also died when the Indian Gunships fired on the Vessel carrying the hostages. Mercenaries, and later also the mastermind of the attempted coup, were tried and sentenced to death, later commuted to life in prison. Some were later pardoned.

Despite the coup attempts, Maumoon served three more presidential terms. In the 1983, 1988, and 1993 elections, Maumoon received more than 90% of the vote. Although the government did not allow any legal opposition, Maumoon was opposed in the early 1990s by the growth of Islamist radicalisation and by some powerful local business leaders.

Maumoon's tenure was marked by several allegations of corruption as well as allegations of autocratic rule, human rights abuses and corruption.

Maumoon's opponents and international human rights groups had accused him of employing terror tactics against dissidents, such as arbitrary arrests, detention without trial, employing torture, forced confessions, and politically motivated killings.

=== Nasheed presidency ===
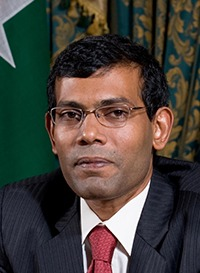
Mohamed Nasheed, President of the Maldives (2008–2012)

In the country's first democratic elections, Maumoon Abdul Gayoom sought reelection. He lost to Mohamed Nasheed, an activist and politician who had been criticising Maumoon's government, who won with 54% of votes to Gayoom's 45%. Nasheed famously held the world's first underwater cabinet meeting to push a stronger climate change agreement for the 2009 United Nations Climate Change Conference. His presidency was marked with political turmoil. On 29 June 2010, Nasheed's entire cabinet resigned and alleged that the opposition parliament members were attempting a power grab, making it impossible for the ministers to execute their responsibility. In January 2012, Nasheed ordered the arrest of Judge Abdulla Mohamed against court orders. Nasheed's presidency faced a major political crisis which led to his resignation. He later stated that former president Maumoon and vice-president Mohamed Waheed Hassan Manik plotted a coup against him.

=== Waheed presidency ===
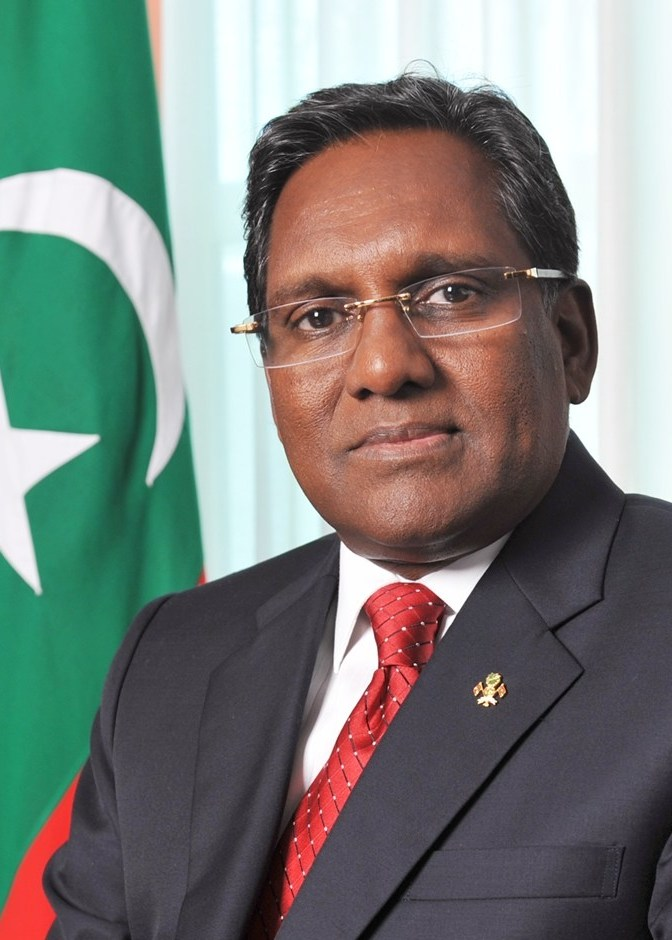
Mohamed Waheed Hassan Manik, President of the Maldives (2012–2013)

Nasheed's vice-president, Mohamed Waheed Hassan Manik, ascended to the presidency after Nasheed resigned on 7 February 2012. The Commission of National Inquiry (CoNi) was established by President Waheed to investigate the events of 7 February 2012. The CoNI report revealed that the transfer of power was legal and Nasheed's resignation was voluntary, with no evidence to support Nasheed's version of events. The CoNI report was endorsed by the Commonwealth of Nations, US Department of State, United Nations and the Foreign & Commonwealth Office.

=== Yameen presidency ===
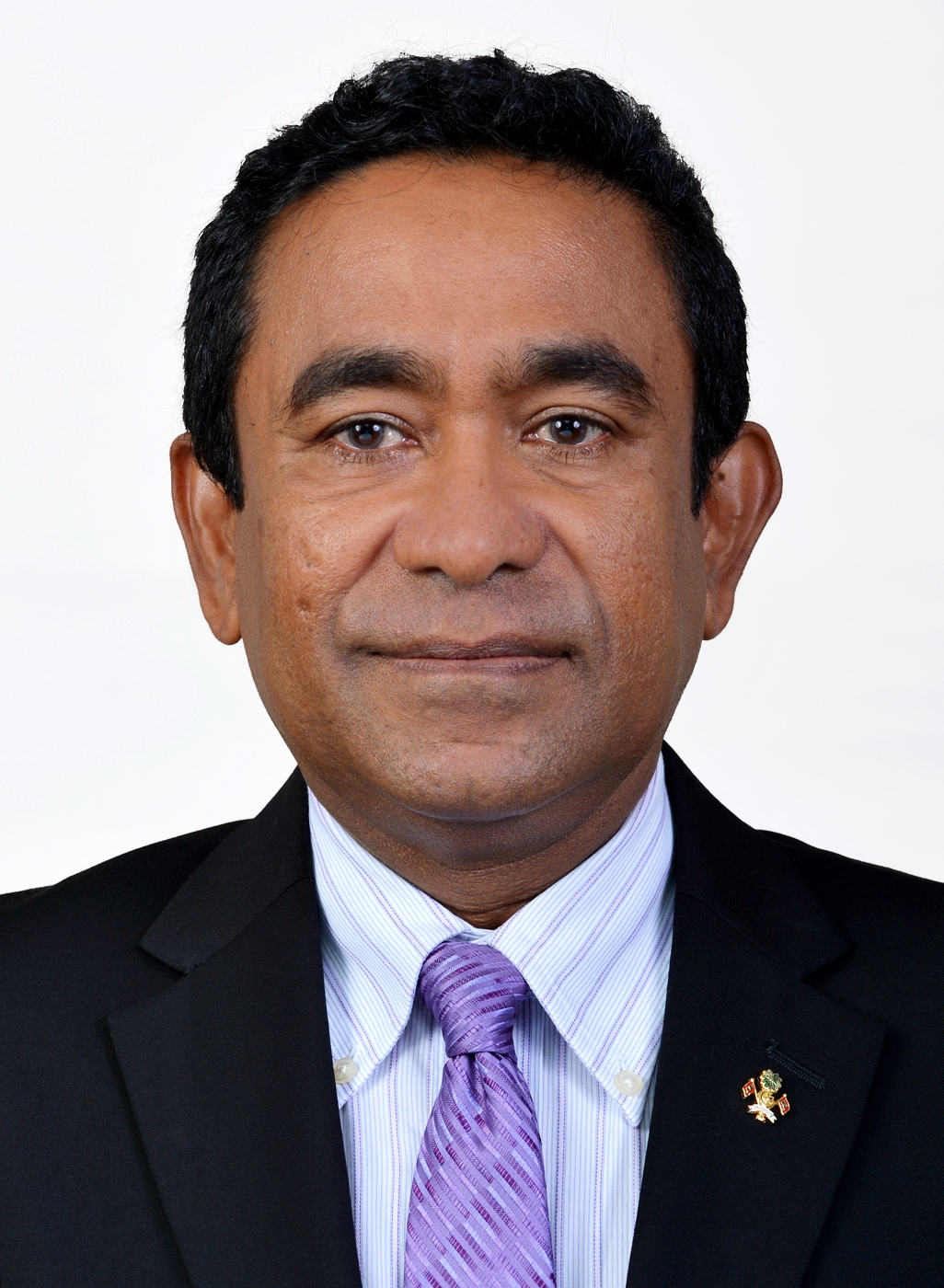
Abdulla Yameen Abdul Gayoom, President of the Maldives (2013–2018)

As Waheed's presidency came to an end after the 2013 Maldivian presidential election, Abdulla Yameen Abdul Gayoom was sworn in as the new president. Yameen obtained 53,099 votes to Waheed's obtained 10,750. In 2015, former president Mohamed Nasheed was found guilty on terrorism charges and was sentenced to 13 years in prison which many calls politically motivated. He later fled to the UK in May 2016 and gained asylum.

In July 2015, Yameen's first vice-president, Mohamed Jameel Ahmed was removed by parliament through a no confidence motion against him. The tourism minister at the time, Ahmed Adeeb Abdul Ghafoor, was then sworn in as the Vice-President. However, Ahmed Adeeb was removed in November 2015 following a no confidence motion against him by the parliament. He was charged with treason in connection with an explosion on President Yameen's speedboat. On 22 June 2016, Abdulla Jihad was appointed as the third vice-president.

In June 2016, in an investigation titled Stealing Paradise by Al Jazeera which uncovered corruption and islands being leased at discount prices without public tender. In 2018, Yameen unveiled Sinamalé Bridge, which connects Malé, Velana International Airport & Hulhumalé with the help of the Chinese government. The Maldives also left The Commonwealth after human rights abuse allegations were made.

Similarly to Nasheed's presidency, Yameen's presidency also faced a political crisis, which led to Yameen declaring a state of emergency. During the state of emergency, Yameen ordered the arrest of Maumoon Abdul Gayoom (his half brother), Chief Justice Abdulla Saeed and Justice Ali Hameed. He also ordered the arrest of many of his political rivals such as Qasim Ibrahim.

=== Solih presidency ===
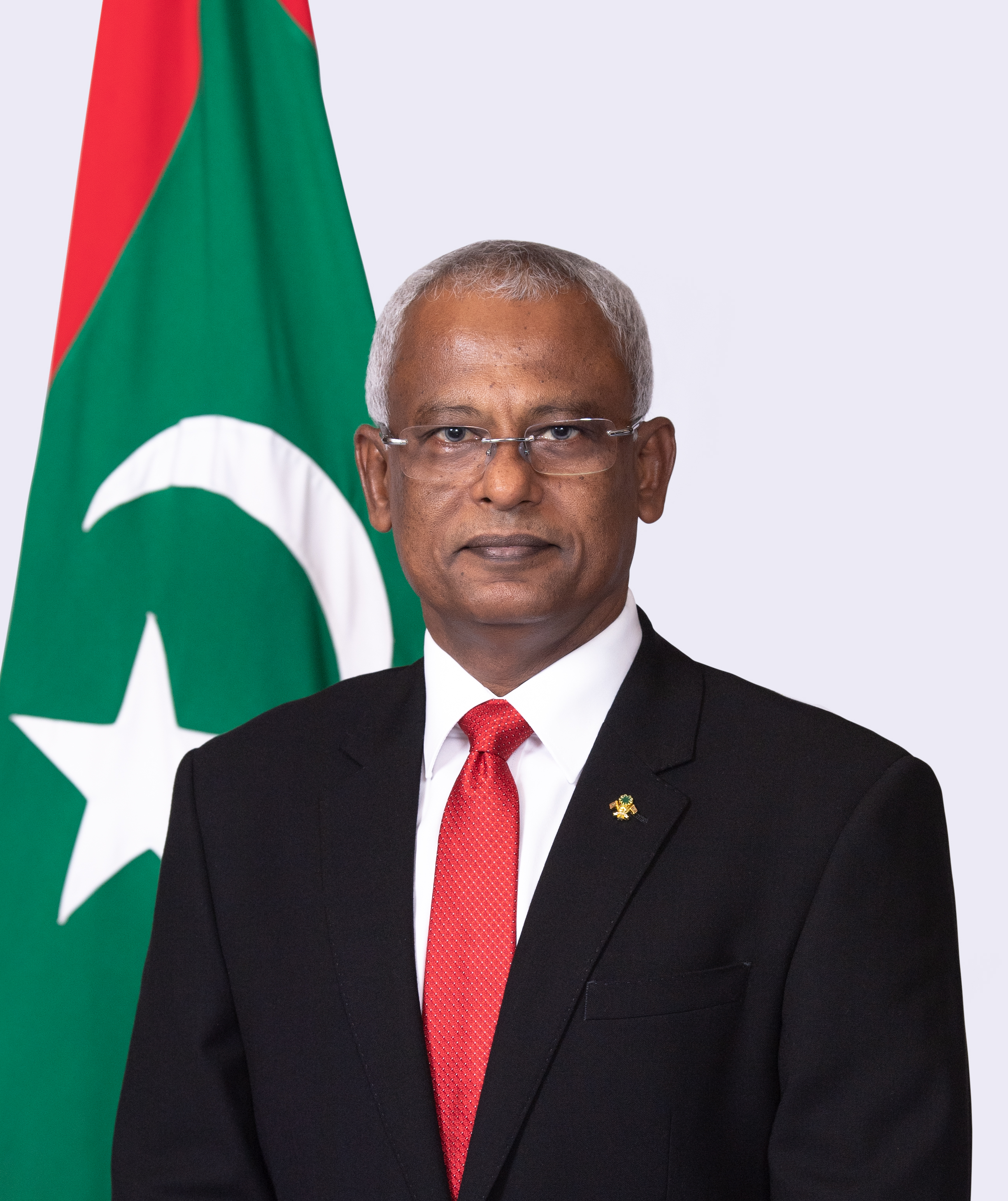
Ibrahim Mohamed Solih, President of the Maldives (2018–2023)

Yameen's presidency ended after he was defeated in the 2018 Maldivian presidential election. Yameen received 96,052 votes while his successor, Ibrahim Mohamed Solih (Ibu), the MP for the Hinnavaru Constituency received 134,705. In 2020, the Maldives re-joined the Commonwealth.

Solih's government increased the use of Renewable Energy Sources such as solar power to reduce the country's reliance on imported fossil fuels. New hospitals were constructed on the islands and some were upgraded. Solih's failure to crack down on corruption in the government upset many Maldivians, and some accuse him of normalising corruption. Solih announced the construction of Thilamalé Bridge, which aims to connect Malé, Villingili, Gulhifalhu, and Thilafushi. There have been many concerns with the development of the bridge, including environmental impact and quality assurance.

=== Muizzu presidency ===
Solih's term ended after he was defeated in the 2023 Maldivian presidential election. He received 86,161 voted in the first round and 109,868 votes in the second round. His successor, Mohamed Muizzu, a politician and engineer with previous service in senior government positions, obtained 101,635 votes in the first round and 129,159 votes in the second. Muizzu's government was faced challenges early on: at the beginning of 2024, relations with India became strained after three Deputy Ministers of the Ministry of Youth, Empowerment, Information and Arts tweeted against Indian Prime Minister Narendra Modi. It led to Indians refusing to visit the Maldives and the suspension of the deputy ministers. Two of them resigned after an 8-month suspension with pay, and soon they were hired in MACL and HDC at high-salary positions. Three ministers from Muizzu's cabinet, Mohamed Shaheem Ali Saeed, Ali Haidar Ahmed and Ahmed Usham, were rejected by the parliament, which led to Muizzu re-appointing the three ministers.

== See also ==
- List of Maldivian presidents by age
- Politics of the Maldives
- History of the Maldives
- List of sultans of the Maldives
- List of head of state of the Maldives
- First family of the Maldives
- Prime Minister of the Maldives
- Vice-President of the Maldives
- First Lady of the Maldives
- Second Lady of the Maldives
