= Ahmed Adeeb =

Vice President of the Maldives from 2015 to 2015

- އަޙްމަދު އަދީބު
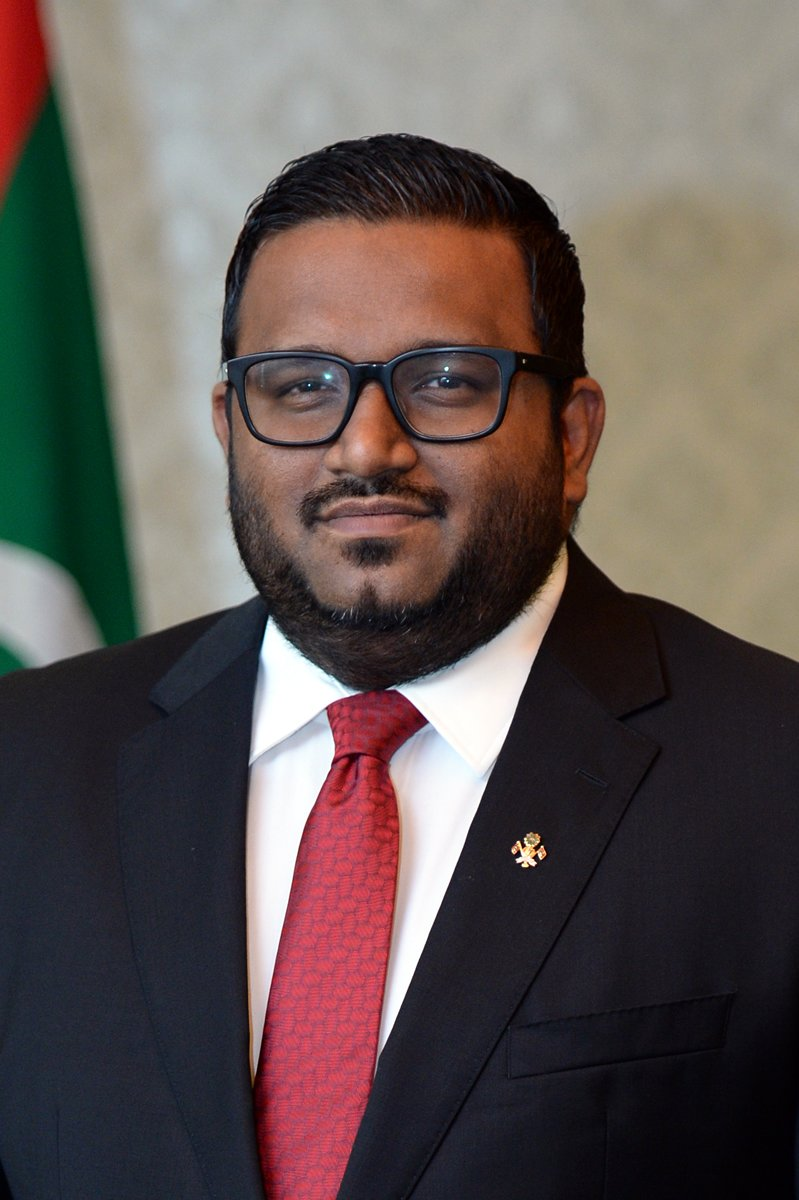
- Official portrait, 2015

10th Vice President of the Maldives
- In office 22 July 2015 – 5 November 2015
- President: Abdulla Yameen
- Preceded by: Mohamed Jameel Ahmed
- Succeeded by: Abdulla Jihad

Minister of Tourism, Arts & Culture
- In office 12 February 2012 – 22 July 2015
- President: Mohamed Waheed Hassan; Abdulla Yameen
- Preceded by: Dr. Mariyam Zulfa
- Succeeded by: Moosa Zameer

Vice President of the Progressive Party of Maldives
- In office 18 January 2013 – 27 October 2015

Personal details
- Born: Ahmed Adeeb Abdul Ghafoor; 11 April 1982 (age 44) Henveiru, Malé, Maldives
- Other political affiliations: Progressive Party of Maldives (until 2018); Maldives Third Way Democrats (2018–2025)
- Spouse: Aminath Liusha (m. 2006; div. 2018) Maryam Nashwa (m. 2015)
- Children: 2
- Education: Staffordshire University; Edith Cowan University
- Website: presidency.gov.mv/PO/FormerVP/2

Ahmed Adeeb Abdul Ghafoor (Dhivehi: އަޙްމަދު އަދީބު ޢަބްދުލްޣަފޫރު; born 11 April 1982) is a Maldivian politician who served as the 10th vice president of the Maldives in 2015. Prior to his appointment on 22 July 2015, he served as the Minister of Tourism, Arts and Culture.

== Early life and education ==
Ahmed Adeeb was born and raised in Malé. His father served in the military and his mother worked as an executive at the Maldives Customs Service. He attended the Majeediyya School for his primary education before receiving his degree from Staffordshire University in 2007. He received his Master of Business Administration degree from Edith Cowan University in 2008.

== Career ==
Adeeb began his career in 2001 at Maldives Customs Services. After graduating in 2008, he started work as the chief operating officer at Millennium Capital Holdings Pvt Ltd, before he got elected as the Treasurer of Maldives National Chamber of Commerce and Industries (MNCCI) the same year.

He was later elected as president of the Maldives National Chamber of Commerce and Industries (MNCCI) in 2011. On 12 February 2012 Ahmed Adeeb was sworn in as the Minister of Tourism and continued to serve until 22 July 2015 when he was appointed as the fifth Vice President of Maldives.

On 24 October 2015, it was announced that Adeeb had been arrested by Maldives police in connection with a 28 September 2015 bomb attack which targeted President Abdulla Yameen. On 5 November, Adeeb was removed from office as vice president by a no confidence vote from the People's Majlis.

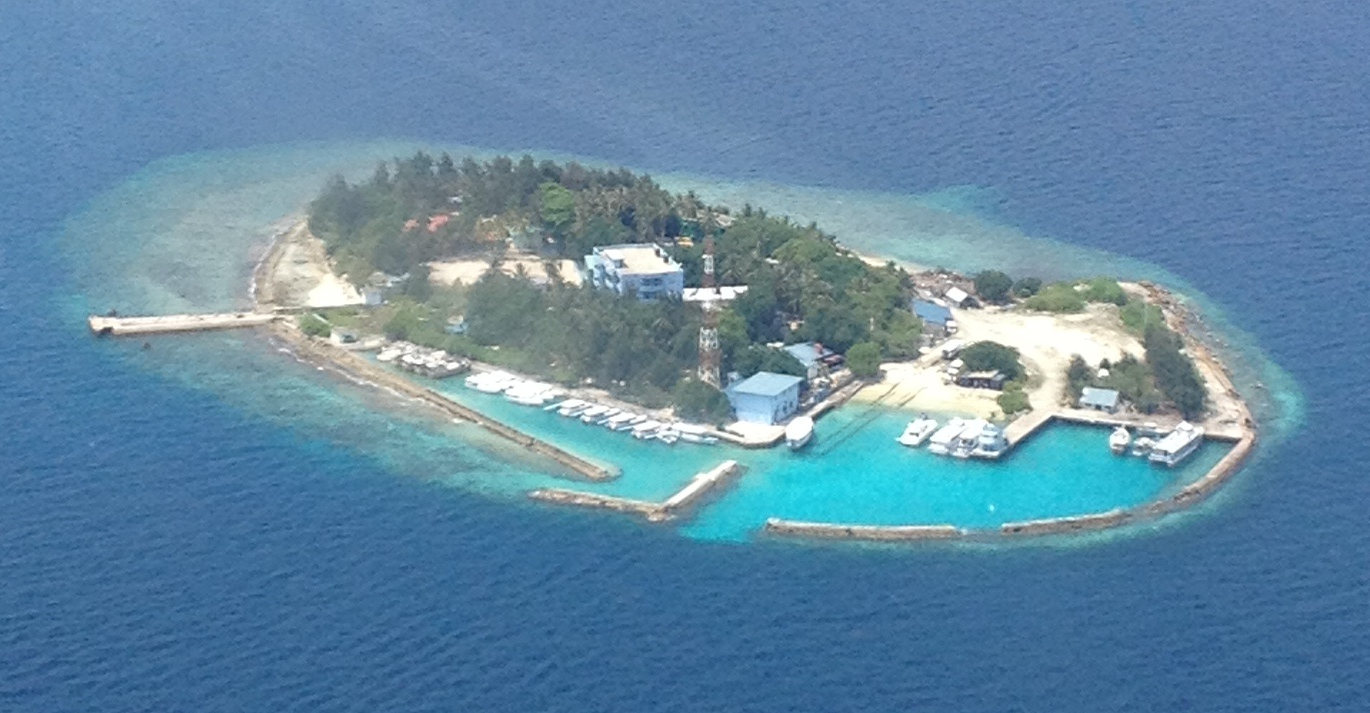
Dhoonidhoo Prison Island

== Political career ==
After the controversial resignation of President Mohamed Nasheed on 7 February 2012, President Waheed appointed Adeeb as Tourism Minister. After Abdulla Yameen was sworn in as President of Maldives, on 17 November 2013, Adeeb was appointed as Minister of Tourism, Arts and Culture. Apart from being the Tourism Minister, Adeeb was also the co-chair of the Economic Council until October 2015.

Following the historic decision by the Maldives’ People's Majlis to bring first amendment to the 2007 Constitution by capping the eligibility age for presidency between 30 and 65 years and thereby paving the way for a “youth” Vice President and the impeachment of Dr. Mohamed Jameel Ahmed from his vice presidency portfolio, Adeeb was appointed as vice president on 23 July 2015. His appointment was endorsed by the People's Majlis by a record majority of 78 out of 85 votes in favor.

On 24 October 2015, Adeeb was arrested following the Finifenmaa boat explosion and was charged with high treason with the Criminal Court of Maldives passing a 15-year prison sentence against him. However, the sentence was overruled on 20 May 2019 by the High Court of Maldives.

== Controversies ==
Adeeb was detained by Indian authorities on 1 August 2019 after he arrived illegally by tugboat in the city of Thoothukudi, Tamil Nadu. Indian officials stated that Adeeb was detained because he did not have valid travel documents and did not arrive at a legal port of entry. Adeeb was transferred to the Maldives escorted by the Indian Coast Guard, where he was arrested by Maldivian police.

On 6 October 2020, Adeeb was sentenced to 20 years in prison, after he pleaded guilty to money laundering and embezzlement from the Maldives Marketing and Public Relations Corporation along with its managing director, Abdulla Ziyath, who received a prison sentence of 11 years.

In November 2023, president Ibrahim Mohamed Solih pardoned Adeeb, which drew criticism from many local NGOs. After being pardoned, Adeeb moved to Singapore.

=== Adeeb files ===
In September 2025, a forensic report extracted from one of Adeeb's mobile phones was leaked on X, under the hashtag #AdeebFiles, by an anonymous account operating under the name "Jubraan Shareef". The material included chat logs, contact lists, and calendar entries, which media reports described as showing politicians, judges, and high-ranking officials seeking financial assistance from Adeeb.

== Personal life ==
Adeeb is an avid footballer. He represented club and country in youth age groups. His love for music led to his sponsorship and event sourcing of one of the biggest major concert gigs in the Maldives, which included international artist Akon, as well as Bollywood stars and bands.

Adeeb is married to Mariyam Nashwa and has a daughter and son from his previous marriage.
