= Mohamed Waheed Deen =

Vice President of the Maldives from 2012 to 2013

- މުޙަންމަދު ވަޙީދުއްދީން
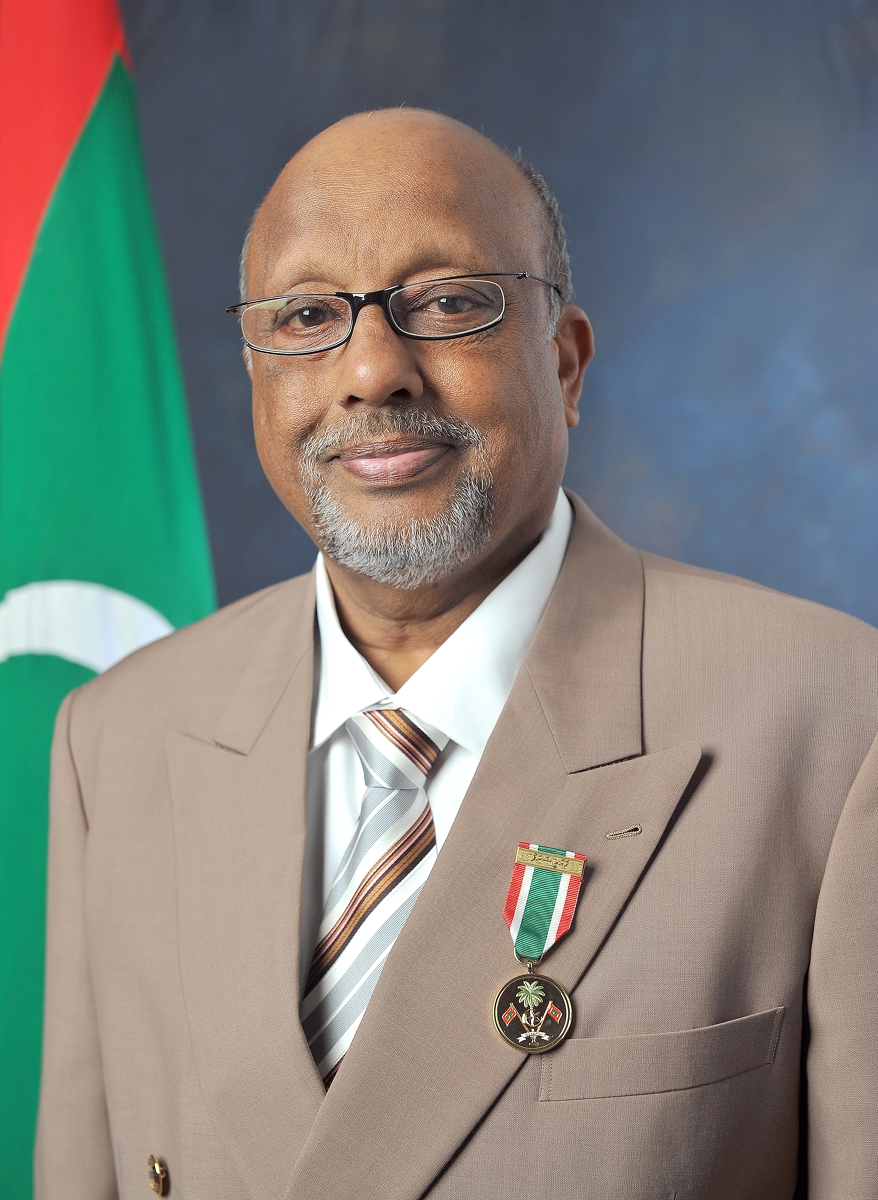
- Official portrait, 2012

Vice President of the Maldives
- In office 25 April 2012 – 10 November 2013
- President: Mohamed Waheed Hassan
- Preceded by: Mohamed Waheed Hassan
- Succeeded by: Mohamed Jameel Ahmed

Minister of Youth and Sports
- In office June 2007 – 8 August 2008
- President: Maumoon Abdul Gayoom

Minister of Atolls Development
- In office 14 July 2005 – June 2007
- President: Maumoon Abdul Gayoom

Personal details
- Born: 3 March 1947 (age 79) Malé, Maldive Islands
- Awards: Full list

Mohamed Waheed Deen (Dhivehi: މުޙަންމަދު ވަޙީދުއްދީން; born 3 March 1947; also known as Mohamed Waheeduddeen) is a Maldivian politician and businessman who served as the 8th vice president of the Maldives from 25 April 2012 to 10 November 2013. He was appointed to the position by President Mohamed Waheed Hassan on 15 February 2012, following the disputed resignation of the previous president, Mohamed Nasheed. He is also the Chairman of Bandos Maldives.

== Career ==
Ever since the start of the tourism industry in the Maldives, Deen had been very interested in that. He quickly began his career as a public relations officer.

Deen had later become the chairman of Bandos Maldives. He's later been appointed in many government posts during the presidency of Maumoon Abdul Gayoom.

He supported many non governmental organisations, cofounding and becoming a member of a few including the Diabetes Society of Maldives, Maldives National Chamber of Commerce and Industry, Maldives Association of Tourism Industry, and more.

Deen was one of the members of the Human Rights Commission of the Maldives from 2003 to 2005. He served as the Minister of Atolls Development from 2005 before resigning in June 2007. During this time, he was hailed as "the founding father of local government in the Maldives" for leading the efforts to introduce local governing through local councils. During that same month, he was appointed as the Minister of Youth and Sports, which he served until August 2008.

He was later nominated as the Vice President of the Maldives in February 2012 by President Mohamed Waheed Hassan. The People's Majlis later approved his nomination in April, where he was later appointed. During his time as the vice president, he represented the Maldives in international meetings.

Deen resigned as the vice president hours before his vice presidential term was supposed to end, at midnight on 11 November 2012.

== Awards ==
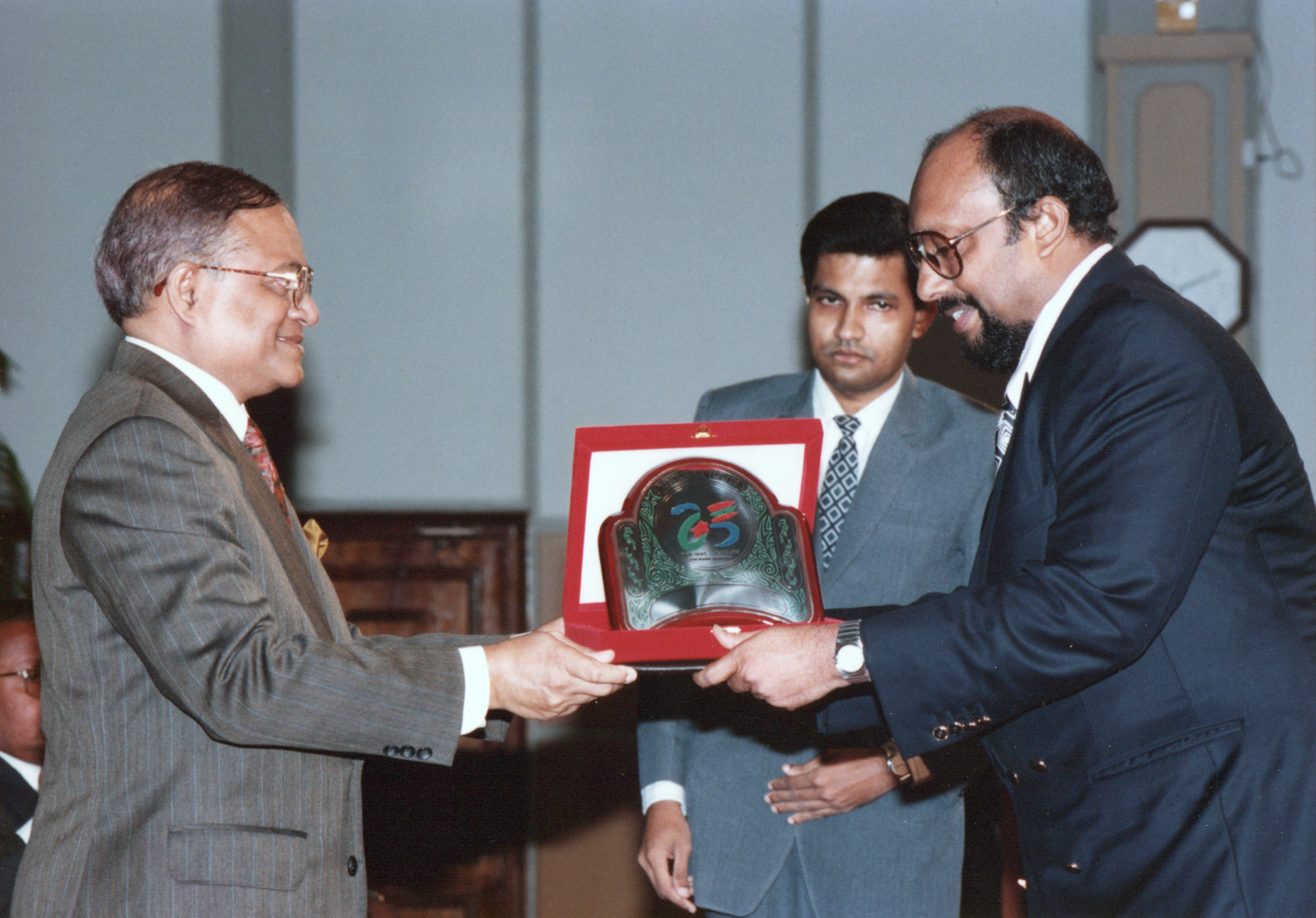
Deen (R) being awarded the National Award for his contributions to the tourism industry in 1993 by President Maumoon Abdul Gayoom (L)

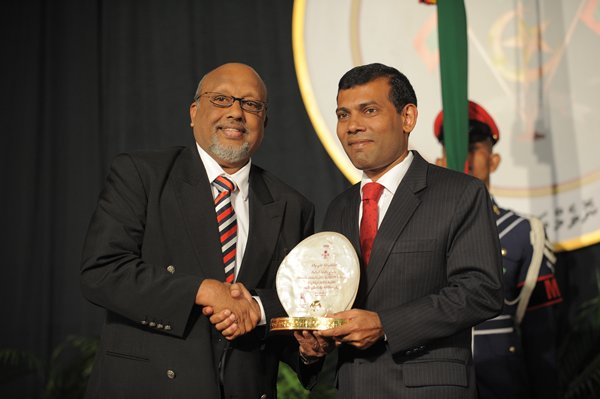
Deen (L) being awarded the National Award of Honour in 2010 by President Mohamed Nasheed (R)

Deen had received many awards and certificates from the Maldivian government.

In 1988, following the terrorist attack on the Maldives, he was given a Certificate of Commemoration for his services following the coup attempt.

In 1993 and 1996, Deen was presented the National Award in recognition for his services in the tourism industry and community development respectively by President Maumoon Abdul Gayoom.

In 2010, Deen was awarded the National Award of Honour for his contributions to the society by President Mohamed Nasheed.

== Personal life ==
Deen is the son of Prince Abdullah Imaaduddeen and Koli Dhon Didi. He is also a member of the Maldivian Royal Family as his grandfather was Sultan Muhammad Imaaduddeen VI.
