= Mohamed Jameel Ahmed =

Vice President of the Maldives from 2013 to 2015

- މުޙައްމަދު ޖަމީލް އަޙުމަދު
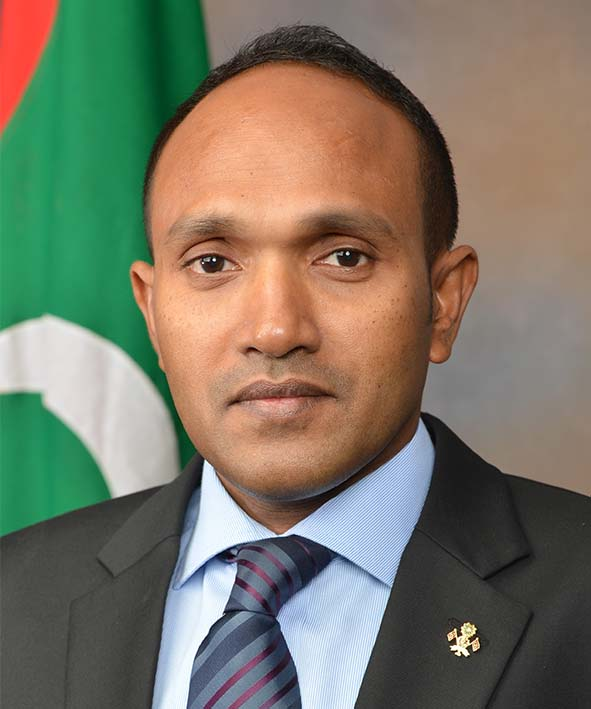
- Official portrait, 2015

9th Vice President of the Maldives
- In office 17 November 2013 – 21 July 2015
- President: Abdulla Yameen
- Preceded by: Mohamed Waheed Deen
- Succeeded by: Ahmed Adeeb

Minister of Home Affairs
- In office 8 February 2012 – 11 May 2013
- President: Mohamed Waheed Hassan
- Preceded by: Hassan Afeef
- Succeeded by: Ahmed Shafeeu

Minister of Civil Aviation and Communication
- In office 12 November 2008 – 30 May 2009
- President: Mohamed Nasheed
- Succeeded by: Mahmood Razee

Minister of Justice
- In office July 2005 – August 2007
- President: Maumoon Abdul Gayoom

Personal details
- Born: Mohamed Jameel Ahmed; 13 October 1969 (age 56) Dhoondigan, Fuvahmulah, Maldives
- Party: People's National Front (2023–)
- Other political affiliations: Progressive Party of Maldives (2011–2023); Dhivehi Rayyithunge Party (2003–2011)
- Education: Jamia Salafia, Faisalabad; SOAS, University of London; International Islamic University Malaysia

Mohamed Jameel Ahmed (Dhivehi: މުޙައްމަދު ޖަމީލް އަޙުމަދު; born 13 October 1969) is a Maldivian lawyer and politician who was the 9th vice president of the Maldives from 2013 to 2015. He previously served as Minister of Justice from July 2005 to August 2007, as Minister of Civil Aviation and Communication from November 2008 to May 2009 and as Minister of Home Affairs from February 2012 to May 2013. He was once a member of the New Maldives group. In 2015, he was impeached by the parliament and removed from office.

== Political career ==
In July 2007, Jameel made history when he defied conservative Islamists and nominated three women judges, the first time the Maldives had admitted women to the judicial bench.

He resigned as Minister of Justice after accusing President Maumoon Abdul Gayoom of failing to take action against rising Islamic militancy and blocking progress of reforms. One month after Jameel resigned, the Maldives experienced its first ever homegrown terrorism incident when young Islamic radicals blew up a homemade bomb in a public park, injuring a dozen foreign tourists.

Jameel is renowned for his public speaking talents and passion for the reform of the criminal justice system, Jameel secured the highest number of votes in the elections to the Party Executive Council, polling even more votes than President Gayoom.

After leaving government, Jameel became a co-founder of the New Maldives which lead the Opposition against the incumbent 30-year-old regime. After the election of President Mohamed Nasheed, Jameel served as Minister of Civil Aviation and Telecommunications from November 12, 2008 to May 30, 2009.

Jameel was impeached following a no confidence motion submitted by the ruling party, backed by the opposition and independent parliament members. According to sources, the main reason for impeachment was for the illegal attempt of a coup to take over presidency. These dealings were leaked by the parliamentarians, primarily for the reason that all political stakeholders in the country strongly opposed the coup. Jameel has won a constitutional case against his grounds for his removal at Supreme Court of Maldives in 2022 case.
