= Hussain Mohamed Latheef =

Vice President of the Maldives since 2023

- ހުސައިން މުހައްމަދު ލަތީފް
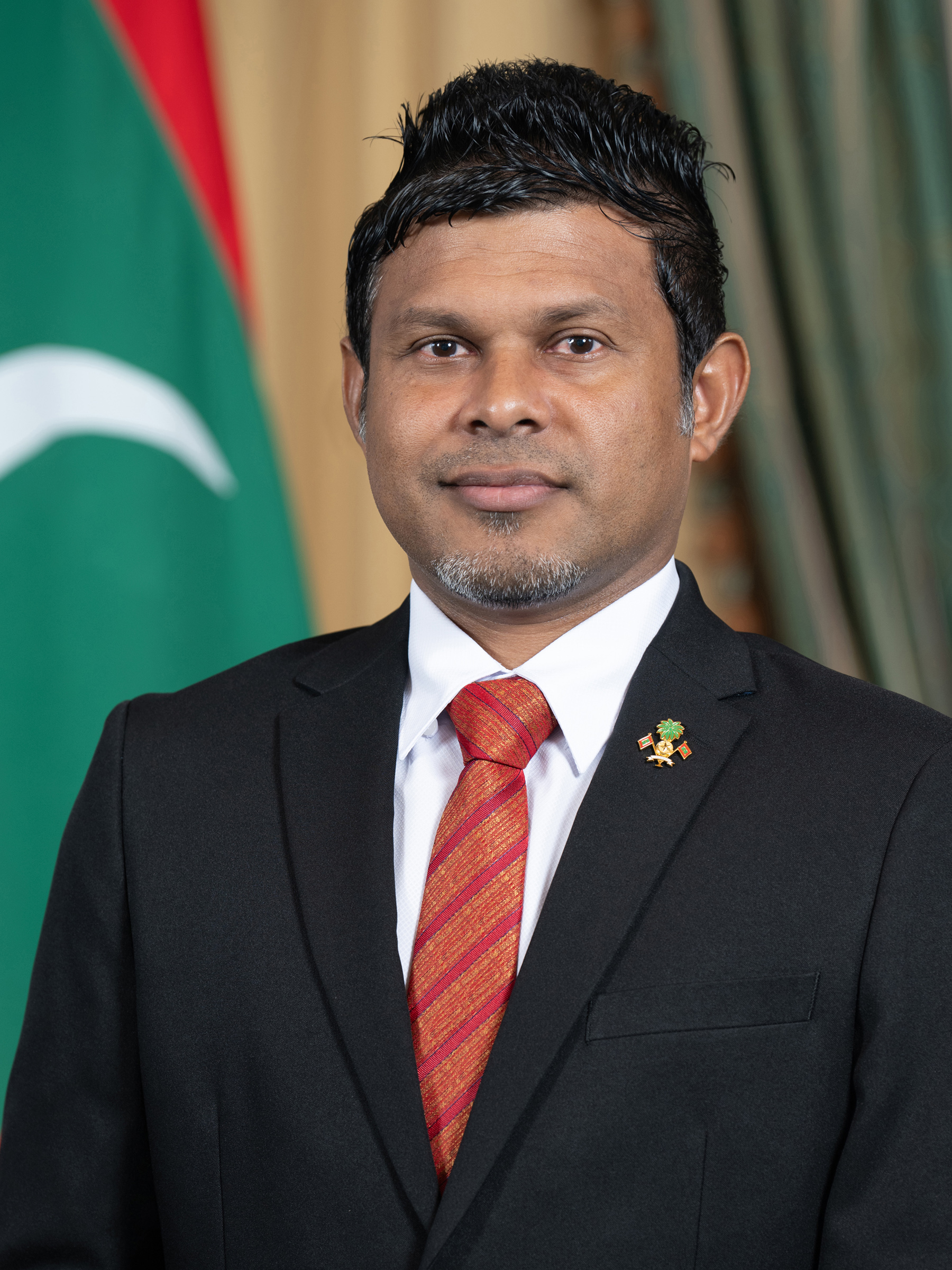
- Official portrait, 2024

13th Vice President of the Maldives
- Incumbent
- Assumed office 17 November 2023
- President: Mohamed Muizzu
- Preceded by: Faisal Naseem

Member of the People's Majlis
- In office 28 May 2014 – 16 November 2023
- Preceded by: Ibrahim Muthalib
- Succeeded by: Ashraf Rasheed
- Constituency: Faresmaathodaa

Personal details
- Party: Congress (2023–present)
- Other political affiliations: Progressive (2014–2018); Jumhooree (2019–2023)
- Spouse: Aishath Afreen
- Children: 2
- Education: Al-Azhar University; Anglia Ruskin University
- Hussain Mohamed Latheef's voice Latheef at the closing of the Traffic Monitors Training Programme; Recorded 10 August 2024

Hussain Mohamed Latheef (Dhivehi: ހުސައިން މުހައްމަދު ލަތީފް), commonly known as Sembe (Dhivehi: ސެމްބެ), is a Maldivian politician who has been the 13th Vice President of the Maldives since 2023. He previously served as the Member of the People's Majlis for the Faresmaathodaa constituency from 2014 until his resignation in 2023.

== Early life ==
Hussain Mohamed Latheef was born to Aminath Hussain and Latheef. He graduated from Al-Azhar University with an undergraduate degree in social services and community development in 2009, and from Anglia Ruskin University with a Master of Business Administration in 2018.

== Career ==
In 2004, Latheef became secretary of the Hulhumale' Hospital. He was Senior Vice President of the Football Association of Maldives. He was an assistant investigation officer for the Human Rights Commission of the Maldives.

Latheef joined the Progressive Party of Maldives in 2014, and was a member of its youth-wing. He became a member of the Jumhooree Party in 2018. He later joined the People's National Congress (PNC) and was elected deputy leader in 2023.

In the 2014 election Latheef was elected to the People's Majlis for the Fares-Maathodaa constituency. During his tenure in the People's Majlis he was a member of the Social Affairs, Whole House, Budget, and Public Accounts committees.

Mohamed Muizzu, the presidential nominee of the PNC, selected Latheef as his vice-presidential running mate for the 2023 election. The pair later won the election with 46.06% of the vote in the first round and 54.04% in the second round. Latheef was sworn in as the vice president of the Maldives on 17 November 2023 and resigned as a member of the People's Majlis.

== Personal life ==
Latheef speaks Arabic and English. He is married to Aishath Afreen.

== Works cited ==
=== News ===
- "More lawmakers join Jumhooree Party". Maldives Independent. 27 November 2018. Archived from the original on 15 July 2025.
- Hafeez, Mohammed (17 November 2023). "ހުސައިންގެ މައިންބަފައިންނަށް މިއީ އެންމެ ފަޚުރުވެރި އެންމެ އުފާވެރި ދުވަސް!". Sun. Archived from the original on 7 December 2023.
- Mohamed, Naizak (4 October 2023). "Muizzu and Sembe elected leader and deputy leader of PNC". Sun. Archived from the original on 15 July 2025.
- Rehan, Mohamed (5 August 2023). "Dr. Muizzu selects Hussain Mohamed Latheef as running mate". The Edition. Archived from the original on 17 November 2023.

=== Web ===
- "Honolulu International Forum Featuring His Excellency Hussain Mohamed Latheef, Vice President of the Republic of Maldives". Pacific Forum International. 20 May 2025. Archived from the original on 15 July 2025.
- "Members - People's Majlis of Maldives". People's Majlis. Archived from the original on 17 November 2023.
- "The President and First Lady host the inaugural reception for visiting dignitaries". The President's Office. 17 November 2023. Archived from the original on 7 December 2023.
- "Vice President Uz Hussain Mohamed Latheef". The President's Office. Archived from the original on 15 July 2025.
