= Mohamed Waheed Hassan =

Maldivian politician; president 2012–2013

- މުޙައްމަދު ވަޙީދު ޙަސަން
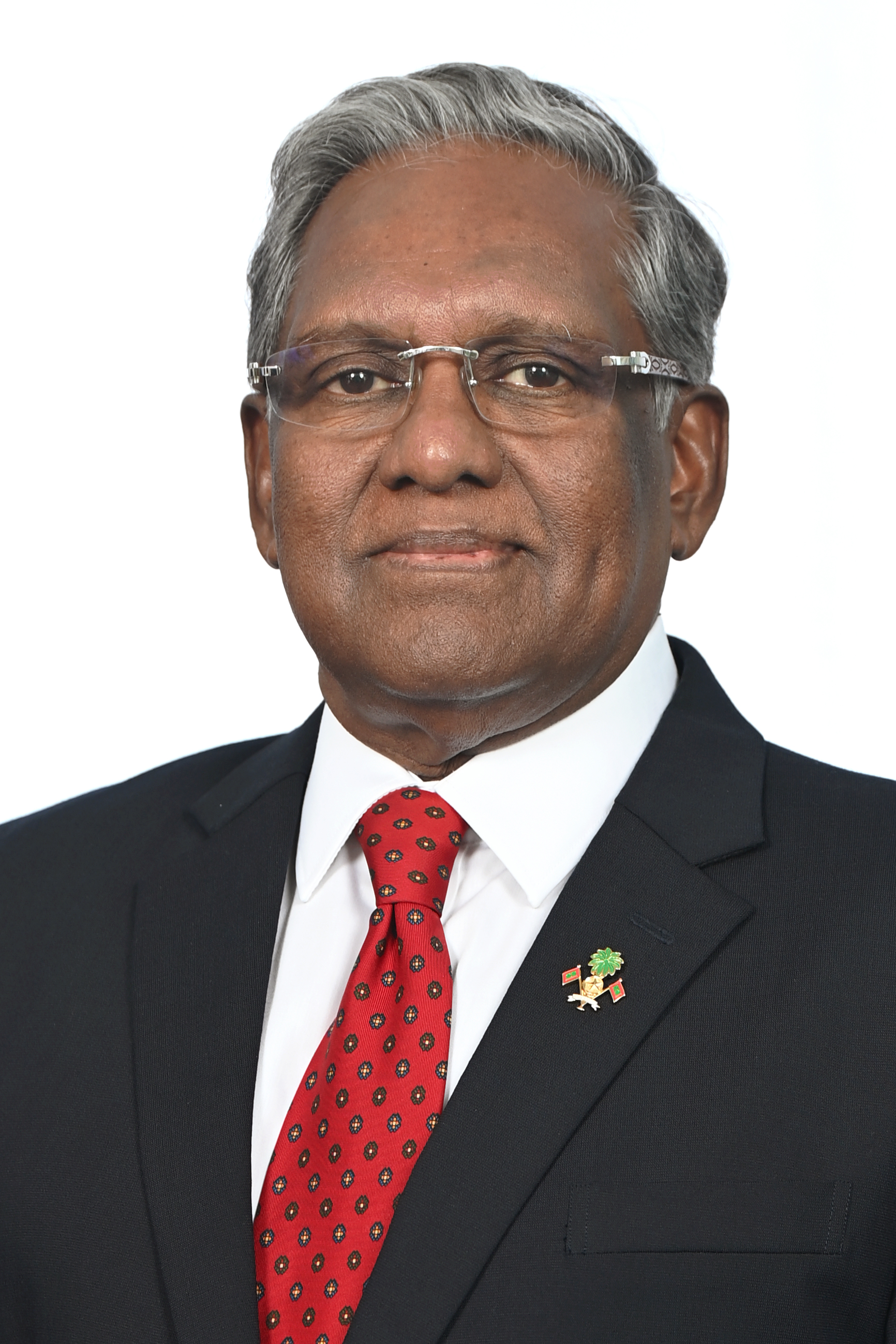
- Official portrait, 2025

Special Envoy of the President
- In office 26 May 2025 – 3 February 2026
- President: Mohamed Muizzu
- Preceded by: Abdul Raheem Abdulla

5th President of the Maldives
- In office 7 February 2012 – 17 November 2013
- Vice President: Mohamed Waheed Deen
- Preceded by: Mohamed Nasheed
- Succeeded by: Abdulla Yameen

7th Vice President of the Maldives
- In office 11 November 2008 – 7 February 2012
- President: Mohamed Nasheed
- Preceded by: Hassan Zareer (1977)
- Succeeded by: Mohamed Waheed Deen

Personal details
- Born: 3 January 1953 (age 73) Machchangolhi, Malé, Maldive Islands
- Party: Jumhooree Party (2023–present)
- Other political affiliations: National Unity Party (2008–2013); Progressive Party of Maldives (2013–2023)
- Spouse: Ilham Hussain (m. 1976)
- Children: 3
- Education: American University of Beirut; Stanford University
- Website: drwaheed.com

Mohamed Waheed Hassan (Dhivehi: މުޙައްމަދު ވަޙީދު ޙަސަން; born 3 January 1953) is a Maldivian politician who served as the fifth President of the Maldives from 7 February 2012 to 17 November 2013, having previously served as Vice President from 2008 to 2012. He assumed the presidency following the resignation of President Mohamed Nasheed. Waheed is also the first Maldivian to receive a doctorate (PhD).

During 2013, he ran for president but received about five percent of the vote in the first round. Following court‑ordered reruns and delays, he remained in office until the inauguration of Abdulla Yameen on 17 November 2013. In May 2025, President Mohamed Muizzu appointed Waheed as Special Envoy of the President until his resignation in February 2026 due to his links with Jeffrey Epstein.

He was the first Maldivian to receive a doctorate (PhD).

== Early life and education ==
Mohamed Waheed Hassan was born on 3 January 1953, being the oldest of ten children. Waheed attended the American University of Beirut, receiving a bachelor's degree in English language and a diploma in teaching.

He later came back to the Maldives in 1976, working as a teacher in Majeediyya School.

Waheed worked part time at Television Maldives (TVM), becoming the first Maldivian to appear in live television when he introduced Ibrahim Shihab who inaugurated TVM.

He received a UNESCO scholarship to study at Stanford University, where he got a master's degree in political science in 1985 and a doctorate of philosophy in International Education Development, marking Waheed as the first Maldivian to receive a doctorate.

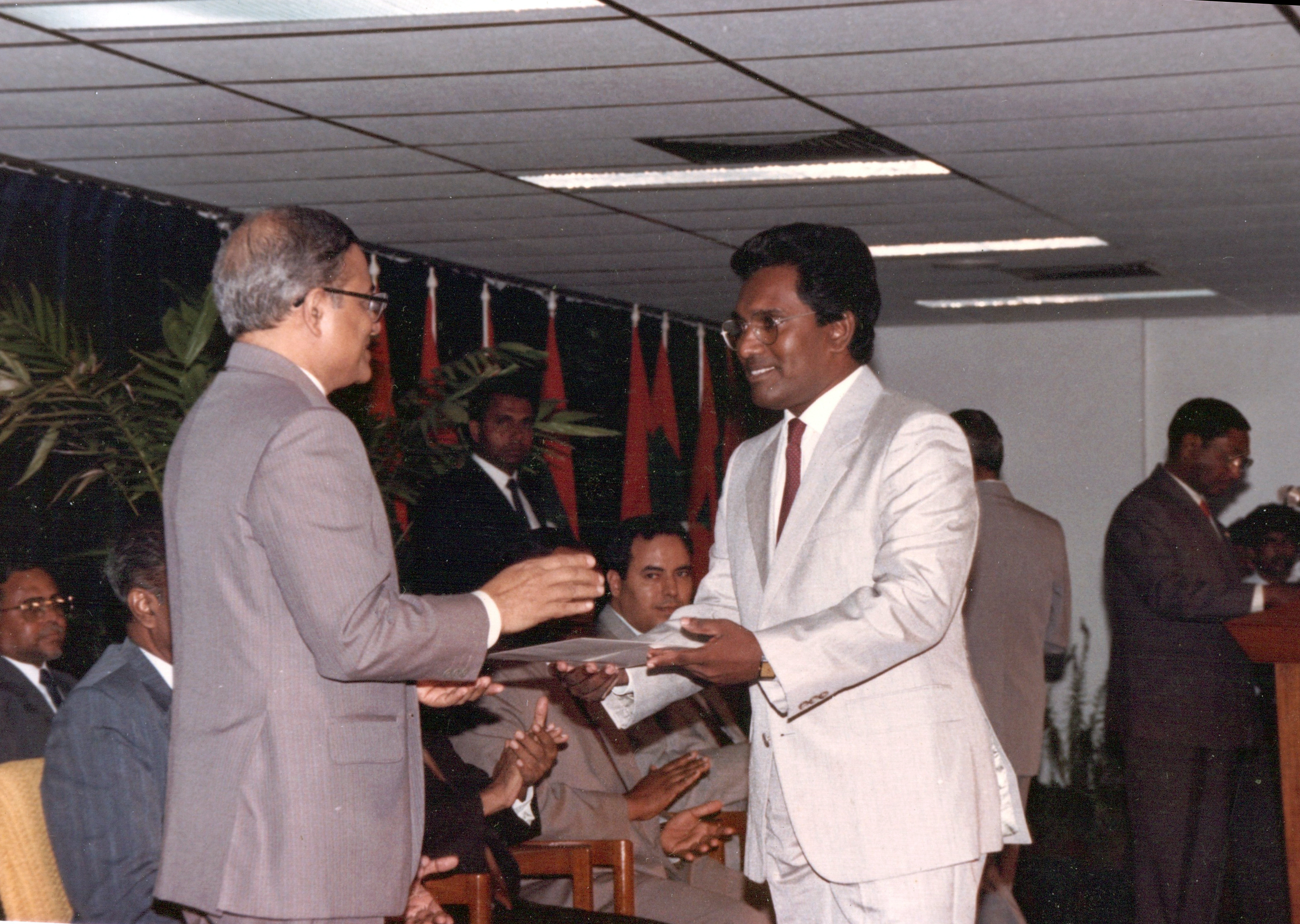
Maumoon Abdul Gayoom awarding Waheed in 1989 for receiving his PhD

== United Nations career ==
After resigning his from his seat in Parliament, Waheed took up consultancies with UNDP and UNESCO in Swaziland, Lesotho, Mozambique, Bangladesh, Fiji, and Western Samoa. Waheed then joined UNICEF in 1992 and served in education and senior management roles in country, regional, and headquarters postings, including as Chief of Education (Tanzania) and as Deputy and Acting Regional Director for South Asia. Following this he was appointed as the United Nations' Special Representative on Education in Afghanistan. He later served as UNICEF's Representative and Head of Mission in many nations including as the Interim Representative of Afghanistan, Yemen, Montenegro, and in FYR Macedonia. He later served as UNICEF representative in Turkmenistan before returning to the Maldives to enter politics.

== Political career ==
During the 1989 parliamentary election, Waheed ran against then–President Maumoon Abdul Gayoom's brother-in-law, Ilyas Ibrahim, and later won.

=== 2008 presidential election ===
After his career in the United Nations, Waheed returned to the Maldives once again to stand for the leadership of the newly formed Maldivian Democratic Party (MDP). Waheed lost the leadership election by a narrow margin. Waheed had given up his position in UNICEF. In 2006, after his work with MDP, he took up a consultancy position. In June 2008, Waheed returned to the Maldives and formed his own political party. Later on, most of his party members, including all the senior figures, reverted to MDP: Gaumee Itthihaad.

Waheed was chosen as the presidential candidate of Gaumee Itthihaad Party (GIP) in the beginning of September. However, when the election date was announced in early October, GIP formed a coalition with the Maldivian Democratic Party, after being approached by the two other main opposition groups: the New Maldives Movement and the Jumhooree Party. Though Waheed was asked to become the vice presidential candidate for both the other parties, Gaumee Itthihaad chose to form an alliance with the largest opposition party, Maldivian Democratic Party, only days before the deadline for the submission of the candidates names. Mohamed Nasheed who was elected as the presidential candidate of MDP chose Waheed as his running mate in the October 2008 presidential election. This was the first democratic election in the history of the country and ended Gayoom's 30-year reign.

After they won the election, Nasheed and Waheed, were sworn in on 11 November 2008, in a special session of the People's Majlis at Dharubaaruge. Waheed was inaugurated as the nation's first democratically elected vice president, the first to serve in the post when it was reinstated after over 50 years.

=== Coup allegations, the CoNI Report and the Presidency (2012–2013) ===
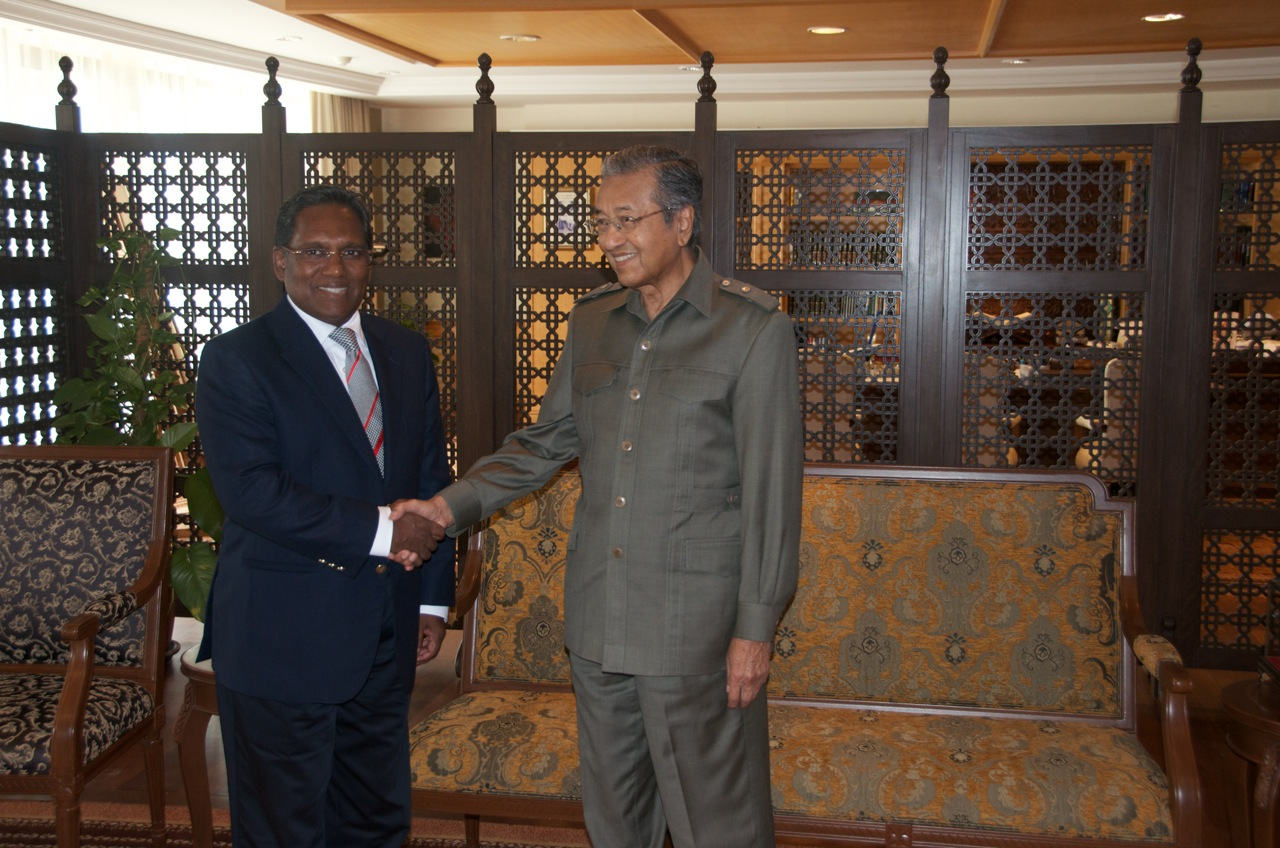
On 1 January 2013, Waheed met with former Malaysian Prime Minister Mahathir Mohamad in Kuala Lumpur

On 7 February 2012, Waheed assumed the presidency following the disputed resignation of President Nasheed, who asserted that he was forced to resign at gunpoint in a coup d'état. A week later, a number of individuals, including Waheed's own brother, Naushad Waheed, accused Waheed of complicity in the alleged coup. Waheed was also criticised both by Nasheed's party and several Human Rights organizations and by the international community for several human rights violations that occurred on the 8th of February following clashes between Nasheed's supporters and the Maldives Police. Waheed and his supporters, however, state that the transfer of power was voluntary and constitutional, and have agreed to launch an independent review of the events surrounding Nasheed's resignation.

BBC News reported that Waheed's subsequent appointment of several ministers associated with the former president Gayoom "raised eyebrows", and that "most believe other forces were at play" behind the protests that chased Nasheed from office. On 11 February, Waheed offered a unity cabinet, but this offer was rejected by Nasheed's supporters. On 19 February, Waheed appointed Gayoom's daughter Dhunya Maumoon a State Minister, prompting a new round of criticism, but also appointed Shaheem Ali Saeed, who is "considered progressive".

In the weeks following the alleged coup, Nasheed requested that the Commonwealth of Nations threaten the Maldives with expulsion unless new elections are held. The Commonwealth has supported Nasheed's call for early elections, calling on both Nasheed and Waheed to enter talks to arrange new polls before the year's end. Waheed said that early elections could be possible, but that "the conditions have to be right to ensure there will be free and fair elections".

On 1 March 2012, Waheed was blocked from opening the Maldivian Parliament by Nasheed, who accused him of breaking a promise to set a date for a new election. On 19 March, he attempted to open parliament again and was once more blocked by Nasheed pro parliamentarians. Four opposition MPs were removed from the building when they tried to physically assault Waheed during his speech. Waheed responded with a speech calling for national unity.

Mohamed Nasheed initially claimed that a coup d'état had occurred, however these claims were proven false by an independent report from the Commission of National Inquiry (CoNI). Nasheed initially accepted this report "with reservations", but later refuted it in its entirety. The Commission of National Inquiry was constituted on 21 February 2012 and published its report on 30 August 2012. The CoNI was composed of 5 members and two advisors, including representatives of the United Nations and Commonwealth. Former Supreme Court Justice of Singapore G.P. Selvam was nominated by the Commonwealth to head the commission. The CoNI's 5 Members also included a representative of Nasheed who was actively involved in the entire process of the report from investigation to drafting, but resigned on 29 August 2012, the day before the CoNI Report was published. Speaking on his resignation, the two advisors - representatives of the United Nations and Commonwealth stated that "Four of the five members [of CoNI] acted with independence and integrity in carrying out the important task for the future of the nation. The other member [nominated by Nasheed] was not at all times willing or able to act independently and resigned the evening before this report was submitted and published... Without any justification, [he] created discord and mistrust in a community which desperately needs reconciliation."

The CoNI Report concluded that "in sum, the Commission concludes that there was no illegal coercion or intimidation nor any coup d'état. The Commission has received no evidence supporting or to substantiate these allegations." "In summary, the commission's findings are as follows:

- The change of President in the Republic of Maldives on 7 February 2012 was legal and constitutional.
- The events that occurred on 6 and 7 February 2012 were, in large measure, reactions to the actions of President Nasheed.
- The resignation of President Nasheed was voluntary and of his own free will. It was not caused by any illegal coercion or intimidation.
- There were acts of police brutality on 6, 7 and 8 February 2012 that must be investigated and pursued further by the relevant authorities.

=== 2013 Presidential candidacy ===
Waheed stood as an independent candidate in the 2013 election but polled about five percent in the first round. The Supreme Court annulled the initial first round citing irregularities and ordered a new vote, leading to a series of postponements. Waheed left office upon Abdulla Yameen's inauguration on 17 November 2013.

=== Post-presidency ===
After Waheed withdrew his nomination in the 2013 presidential elections, he switched parties to the Progressive Party of Maldives (PPM) in the same year. During his time in the PPM, he was appointed to a special position within the party.

In 2022, he gave a video speech at the China-Indian Ocean Region Forum on Development Cooperation discussing about the effects of climate change in the Maldives.

He expressed interest in running for president in the 2023 Maldivian presidential election if president Abdulla Yameen was unable to.

He later left the PPM in 2023 citing that he feels that he should be using his skills to benefit Maldivian citizens. In the same year, he joined the Jumhooree Party (JP).

In 2025, Waheed was appointed by president Mohamed Muizzu as a Special Envoy of the President without remuneration.

== Criticism and controversies ==
=== Coup allegations ===
Waheed was the first Vice President to succeed to presidency, when President Mohamed Nasheed resigned after a mutiny until November 2013. Nasheed alleged that a coup was staged against him which led to Waheed becoming the President, which he denied the allegations. Critics of Waheed called him a "Baghee", an Arabic word for traitor. Many accused Waheed of being a traitor and a puppet being controlled by a higher power.

Soon after taking office during his first press conference, he asked, "Do I look like a man who would stage a coup d'état?". Although he vehemently denies being part of a coup, during a press conference he said, "I have proud political parties in this country who are backing me. And then I have all the law enforcement agencies fully backing me."

=== Relationship with Jeffrey Epstein ===
In August 2025, the release of U.S. court documents showed that in 2012, Waheed had emailed Jeffrey Epstein to inquire about a US$500 million loan for the Maldivian government. Epstein's emails also showed that in 2014, he had emailed the former prime minister of Israel Ehud Barak to meet with Peter Thiel in New York City noting that the 'former President of the Maldives' would be in attendance. Many assume it's Waheed as public records show Nasheed and Gayoom in the Maldives. There was significant public backlash following the revelations.

In November 2025, documents released by the U.S. House Oversight Committee revealed that Waheed and Epstein had a very extensive relationship. Waheed went to Epstein to advice regarding a suspicious financial proposal that came from his finance minister, Abdulla Jihad. Waheed had met Epstein in the U.S. in various occasions such as during the 67th session of the United Nations General Assembly where they met for a private dinner and at one of Epstein's residences where he met Thorbjørn Jagland and Sultan Ahmed bin Sulayem. Email correspondence between Waheed and Epstein showed Waheed asking Epstein for advice as Waheed was creating his campaign team for the 2013 elections. He had also asked Epstein for help regarding managing negative international press about the Maldives during his presidency. It's been alleged that after the passing of the Epstein Files Transparency Act, more information between the two would be revealed.

In January 2026, the United States Department of Justice released another batch of the Epstein files. These files included Waheed's plan during his presidency to build a private island in the Maldives along with Epstein, Waheed meeting with Epstein along with his wife Ilham Hussain and his son Jeffery Waheed, and help for financing his memoir. During his email correspondence with Epstein, he alleged that the 2013 presidential election was being influenced by India and that he would "deliver a good lesson" to former President Maumoon Abdul Gayoom. The public urged President Mohamed Muizzu to dismiss Waheed from his role as Special Envoy to the President and to revoke his benefits under the Former Presidents' Protection and Benefit Act. Adhadhu alleged that Muizzu's government was hesitant to dismiss Waheed. Waheed later resigned as the Special Envoy to the President on 3 February. In a public statement, Waheed's office admitted there were failures of due diligence prior to his meetings with Epstein and stated he was unaware of the Epstein's 2008 conviction.

== Family ==
He is married to Ilham Hussain, founder of Maldives Autism Association. They have three children: Widhadh, Fidha and Jeffrey Salim Waheed.

Jeffery Salim Waheed was posted as Additional Secretary Deputy Minister during Abdulla Yameen's tenure.

== Awards ==
In 2013, Waheed was awarded the Star of Palestine honour by the president of Palestine Mahmoud Abbas. In 2024, he was awarded the Global Islamic Finance Leadership Award by Global Islamic Finance Awards for creating the Islamic Bank of Maldives, Hajj Corporation, and Sukuk in the Maldives during his presidency.

Waheed was also presented an award by President Maumoon Abdul Gayoom for receiving his doctorate (PhD) from Stanford University, becoming the first Maldivian upon whom a Doctor of Philosophy was conferred.

Political offices
Preceded by Ibrahim Muhammad Didi	Vice President of the Maldives; 2008–2012	Succeeded by Mohamed Waheed Deen
Preceded by Mohamed Nasheed	President of the Maldives; 2012–2013	Succeeded by Abdulla Yameen
