= Vice President of the Maldives =

Second-highest constitutional office in the Maldives

Vice President of the Republic of Maldives
- ދިވެހިރާއްޖޭގެ ރައީސުލްޖުމްހޫރިއްޔާގެ ނާއިބު
- State Emblem of Maldives

- Flag of the Maldives

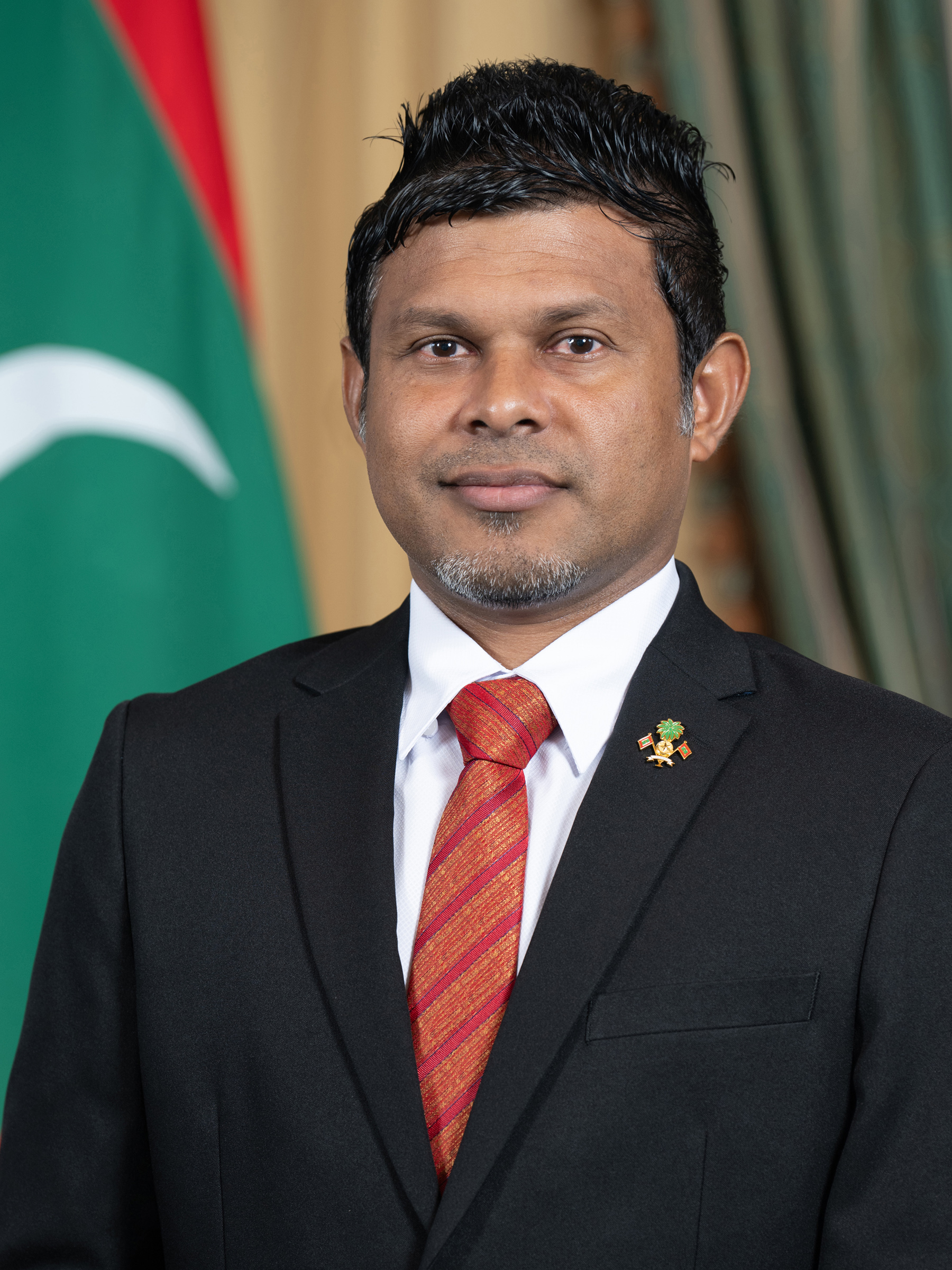
- Incumbent; Hussain Mohamed Latheef since 17 November 2023
- Residence: Hilaaleege
- Appointer: President of the Maldives
- Term length: Five years, renewable
- Inaugural holder: Ibrahim Muhammad Didi
- Salary: MVR 93,000/US$6059 monthly

The vice president of the Republic of Maldives (Dhivehi: ދިވެހިރާއްޖޭގެ ރައީސުލްޖުމްހޫރިއްޔާގެ ނާއިބު, romanized: dhivehiraajjeyge raeesuljumhooriyyaage naaibu) is the second-highest official in the executive branch of the government of the Maldives, after the president of the Maldives, and ranks first in the presidential line of succession. The vice president is directly elected together with the president to a five-year term of office.

Ibrahim Muhammad Didi was the first vice president and was an appointee, while Mohamed Waheed Hassan was the first elected vice president.

The vice president is the first in the line of succession to the presidency in the event of the president's death, resignation, or removal from office.

The current office-holder is Hussain Mohamed Latheef, who was sworn in on 17 November 2023.

== The Office of the Vice President ==
The post of the Vice President are described in article 112 of the Constitution of Maldives as follows:

- There shall be a Vice President of the Maldives who shall assist the President in the discharge of his duties and responsibilities
- Every candidate for President shall publicly declare the name of the Vice President who will serve with him.
- The qualifications of office for the Vice President shall be the same as those for the President.
- If the office of the President becomes vacant for any reason, the Vice President shall succeed to the office of the President.

Articles 117 and 122 then go on to describe the Responsibilities of the Vice President.

- The Vice President shall exercise such responsibilities and powers of the President as are delegated to him by the President.
- The Vice President shall perform the responsibilities of the President if the President is absent or temporarily unable to perform the responsibilities of office.
- If the office of Vice President becomes vacant because of death, resignation, removal from office, permanent incapacity, or succession to the office of the President, the President shall appoint a new Vice President to serve the remainder of the term. The appointment shall be approved by the People’s Majlis.

As a result of these responsibilities, the Office of the Vice President and its duties are determined by the President. Under the current government, President Nasheed has charged the Vice President's office with implementing a plan to become Carbon Neutral by 2020, as well as to tackle a drug problem which affects more than half of the youth population.

== The First Vice President ==
The first Vice President of the Maldives was Ibrahim Muhammad Didi of Rayyithunge Muthagaddim Party, who was appointed to the position by President Mohamed Amin Didi (1 January 1953 to 2 September 1953). On the terms that the vacancy of the office of the President leads to the succession of the Vice President to the presidency, Ibrahim Didi also served as acting president from 2 September 1953 to 7 March 1954 after the banishment of Mohamed Amin Didi.

Ibrahim Nasir appointed several of his cabinet ministers as Vice Presidents following the dismissal of Prime Minister Ahmed Zaki.

The Maldives did not have Vice Presidents during the reign of Sultan Muhammad Fareed Didi (1954-68) and the Presidency of Maumoon Abdul Gayoom (1978-2008).

== The First Elected Vice President ==
Under the new constitution created the constitutional assembly and ratified by President Gayoom on 7 August 2008, the post of Vice President was once again created with the duties described above.

Under the new constitution, Dr. Mohamed Waheed Hassan of the Gaumee Itthihaad Party became the first elected Vice President of the Maldives and was sworn into office on November 11, 2008. Mohamed Nasheed was elected into office as the President of the Maldives and together they effectively ended the 30 year rule of then Asia's longest serving ruler President Gayoom.

Dr. Waheed was the senior-most Maldivian in the United Nations when he retired from it in June 2008, to return to the Maldives and become politically active. While in the UN, Dr. Waheed was the head of UNICEF for South Asia, Afghanistan, Yemen, Macedonia, Montenegro, and Turkmenistan. Dr. Waheed was the first Maldivian to receive a PhD having done so from the prestigious Stanford University, having specialized in International Development.

He has been involved in politics in the Maldives since 1989, when he won a Parliamentary seat with the highest number of votes recorded up to that point. However, he was forced out of the country after having pursued a bill on human rights that was not looked favored upon by the administration at the time. Dr. Waheed then spent 16 years working for UNICEF.

== Oath of Office of the Vice President ==
The oath of office of the Vice President is described verbatim in the Maldives' Constitution.

I, …(name of person)…, do swear in the name of Almighty Allah that I will respect the religion of Islam, that I will uphold the Constitution of the Republic of Maldives and the fundamental rights of the Maldivian citizens, that I will bear true faith and allegiance to the Republic of Maldives, and will discharge the duties and responsibilities of the office of Vice President honestly and faithfully under the Constitution and laws of the Republic of Maldives.
