= Elections in the Maldives =

Maldives elects on national level a head of state, the president, and a legislature. The president is elected directly for a five-year term by the people.

Its parliament, the Majlis, has 93 members. All members are elected directly for a term of five years from 93 single-member constituencies. In the 2023 presidential elections, Muizzu emerged victorious over his opponent, Ibrahim Mohamed Solih.

== Latest elections ==
=== 2023 presidential election ===
Candidate	Running mate	Party	First round		Second round	
Candidate	Running mate	Party	Votes	%	Votes	%
Mohamed Muizzu	Hussain Mohamed Latheef	People's National Congress	101,635	46.06	129,159	54.04
Ibrahim Mohamed Solih	Mohamed Aslam	Maldivian Democratic Party	86,161	39.05	109,868	45.96
Ilyas Labeeb	Hussain Amr	The Democrats	15,839	7.18		
Umar Naseer	Maaz Saleem	Independent	6,343	2.87		
Qasim Ibrahim	Ameen Ibrahim	Jumhooree Party	5,460	2.47		
Ahmed Faris Maumoon	Abdul Sattar Yoosuf	Independent	2,979	1.35		
Mohamed Nazim	Ahmed Adheel Naseer	Maldives National Party	1,907	0.86		
Hassan Zameel	Mariyam Aleem	Independent	327	0.15		
Total			220,651	100.00	239,027	100.00
Valid votes			220,651	97.86	239,027	96.81
Invalid/blank votes			4,835	2.14	7,888	3.19
Total votes			225,486	100.00	246,915	100.00
Registered voters/turnout			282,395	79.85	282,804	87.31
Source: Elections Commission, Elections Commission

=== 2024 parliamentary election ===
Party	Votes	%	Seats	+/–
People's National Congress	101,128	47.48	66	+63
Maldivian Democratic Party	65,476	30.74	12	–53
The Democrats	4,634	2.18	0	New
Maldives Development Alliance	4,071	1.91	2	0
Jumhooree Party	3,141	1.47	1	–4
Adhaalath Party	2,538	1.19	0	0
Maldives National Party	1,060	0.50	1	New
Independents	30,931	14.52	11	+4
Total	212,979	100.00	93	+6
Valid votes	212,979	98.10		
Invalid/blank votes	4,120	1.90		
Total votes	217,099	100.00		
Registered voters/turnout	284,663	76.27		
Source: ECM, ORF

== See also ==
- Electoral calendar
- Electoral system
