= Eva Abdulla =

Maldivian politician (born 1978)

- އީވާ ޢަބްދުﷲ
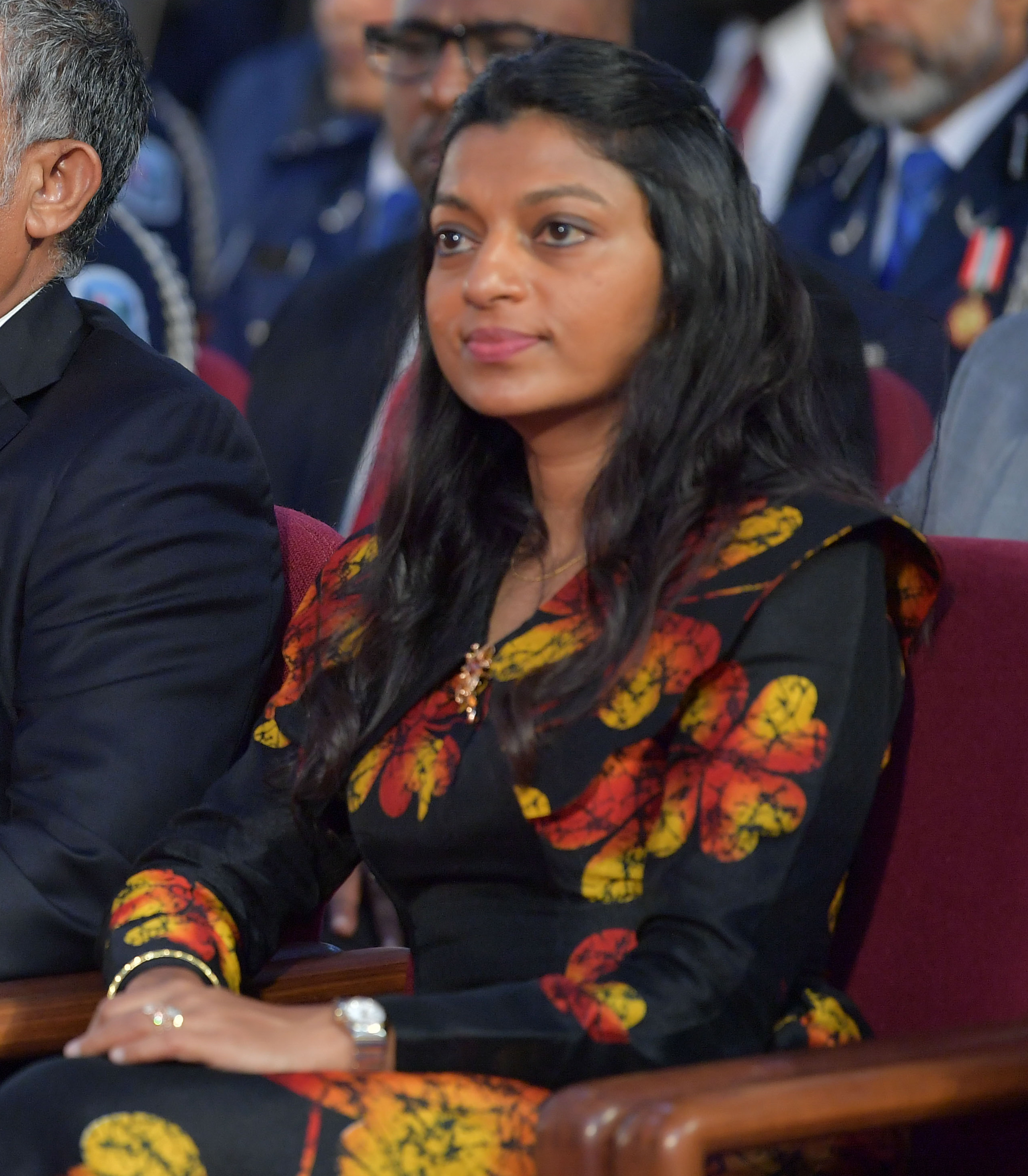
- Eva in 2019

Deputy Speaker of the People's Majlis
- In office 28 May 2019 – 3 December 2023
- Speaker: Mohamed Aslam
- Preceded by: Moosa Manik
- Succeeded by: Ahmed Saleem

Member of the People's Majlis
- In office 9 May 2009 – 28 May 2024
- Preceded by: Constituency established
- Succeeded by: Mohamed Ibrahim
- Constituency: Galolhu Uthuru

Personal details
- Party: Maldivian Democratic Party (2008–2023; 2025–present)
- Other political affiliations: The Democrats (2023–2025)
- Relations: Mohamed Nasheed (cousin)
- Education: University of Kent (BA); University of Warwick (MA)

Eva Abdulla (Dhivehi: އީވާ ޢަބްދުﷲ) is a Maldivian politician who served as the Deputy Speaker of the People's Majlis until her resignation on 3 December 2023. She also served as the member of the People's Majlis for Galolhu Uthuru (Galolhu North) from 2009 to 2026.

== Education ==
Eva graduated from the University of Kent, holding a BA in Politics and Government and a MA in Politics and International Relations from the University of Warwick, England, United Kingdom.

== Career ==
Abdulla previously worked at the World Health Organization, the UNFPA, and was the Manager for the now-defunct local newspaper Minivan Daily. In 2009, Abdulla ran in the parliamentary election for Galolhu Uthuru (Galolhu North) constituency and won with 1243 votes.

During the controversial resignation of President Mohamed Nasheed, Abdulla was beaten by plain clothes officers.

She was later reelected as the MP for Galolhu Uthuru in the 2014 parliamentary election with 1183 votes and in 2019 with 1387 votes.

She was elected as the Deputy Speaker of the People's Majlis along with her cousin Mohamed Nasheed as the Speaker with 76 parliamentarians voting for her. She was the second woman to have presided over a parliament meeting as speaker, with the first being former Deputy Speaker Aneesa Ahmed in 2008.

In 2023, she left the Maldivian Democratic Party to join The Democrats, a newly formed party. A motion of no confidence was brought against Abdulla and signed by fifty MPs after she failed to proceed with the proceedings of the motion against her cousin, Speaker Mohamed Nasheed. The Majlis accepted the motion and Abdulla resigned before proceedings took place.

Abdulla ran in the 2024 parliamentary election but lost to Mohamed Ibrahim (Kudu). She rejoined the Maldivian Democratic Party in 2025.
