= Ahmed Easa (politician) =

Maldivian politician

- އަޙްމަދު އީސާ
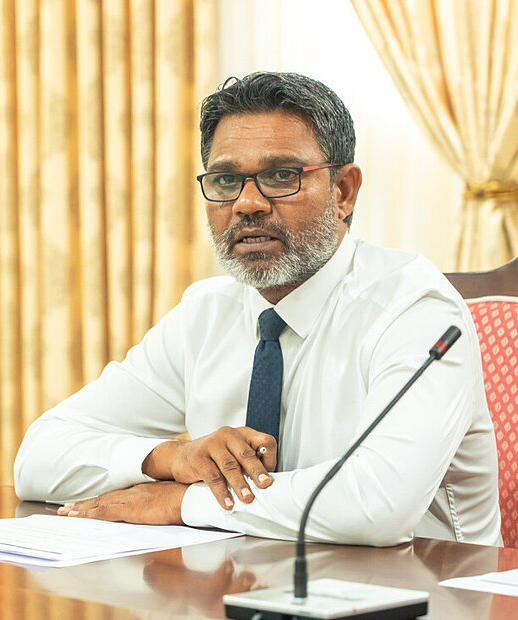
- Easa in 2021

Member of the People's Majlis
- In office 28 May 2019 – 27 May 2024
- President: Ibrahim Mohamed Solih; Mohamed Muizzu
- Preceded by: Ali Mauroof
- Succeeded by: Mohamed Afoo Hamid
- Constituency: Kendhikulhudhoo
- In office 28 May 2009 – 27 May 2014
- President: Mohamed Nasheed; Mohamed Waheed Hassan; Abdulla Yameen
- Succeeded by: Mohamed Ismail
- Constituency: Hoarafushi

Personal details
- Party: Maldivian Democratic Party

Ahmed Easa (/ˈɑːməd ˈiːsə/ AH-med-EE-sah; Dhivehi: އަޙްމަދު އީސާ) is a Maldivian politician and activist who served as the Member of the People's Majlis from 2009 to 2014 and 2019 to 2023. He had also founded the Tourism Employees Association of Maldives (TEAM) in 2008.

== Career ==
=== Early career ===
Before venturing into politics, Easa worked in the tourist resort industry. During his time, he's met famous personalities, including politicians, leaders of various nations.

He's campaigned to amend the Employee Act, which at the time tourist sector employees were completely removed from having labour rights. He met with parliamentarians, the cabinet and other government authorities, and had submitted a local petition which had over 10,000 signatures. After tourism sector employees began strike, President Maumoon Abdul Gayoom asked then–Minister of Legal Reform Mohamed ‘Kutti’ Nasheed to submit amendments to the People's Majlis. He also founded the Tourism Employees Association of Maldives (TEAM) in 2008, serving as the head of the trade union before serving as an advisor.

He had also campaigned in the 2007 referendum for a parliamentary system.

=== Political career ===
Easa had been elected to the People's Majlis following the 2009 parliamentary election where he ran for the Hoarafushi constitutency as part of a Maldivian Democratic Party nominee.

During his time in the 17th Majlis (2009–2014), Easa had been part of the National Development Committee, the Government Oversight Committee, the Disciplinary Committee and a temporary committee.

In 2011, he had presented the Fiscal Responsibility Bill to the Majlis since the expenditure in the Maldives' state budget is out of proportion and the country had a lot of debt. He had also submitted an amendment to the Employment Act that allows employees to get a Ramadan allowance. In 2013, he submitted an amendment to the Drug Act to reduce the prison sentence for refusal to comply with a police officer’s request to provide a urine sample from one year to fifteen days. He received significant backlash over the bill and withdrew it.

He ran in the 2014 parliamentary election for the Kendhikulhudhoo constituency where he lost to Ali Mauroof.

During the 2015 May Day protests in the Maldives, Easa was arrested along with other opposition figures during clashes with police. Easa was allegedly kicked and beaten on the head with batons after he was hauled on to the police vehicle, with Minivan News hearing Easa scream in a van filled with Special Operations officers. He was seen limping during his remand hearing.

He later ran in the 2019 parliamentary election for the same constituency and won.

During his time, he chaired the Committee on State Owned Enterprises, Joint Committee of Committee on Social Affairs and Committee on Economic Affairs, Joint Committee of Committee on National Development And Heritage and Committee on Social Affairs, Foreign Relations Sub-Committee (To scrutinize Annual Reports), and served as the deputy chairperson of the Foreign Relations Committee.

In 2020, he raised concerns about the MMPRC scandal and alleged that implicated individuals are being protected. He alleged that he and his eldest son, Mohamed Jihad Ahmed, were getting threats from people.

He submitted an amendment to the Pension Act allowing pension fund to cover 80 percent of costs for Hajj pilgrimage, which was passed.

Easa alleged that the ongoing Rasmalé project is an MVR 70 billion corruption.

== Controveries ==
=== Domestic violence accusation ===
In 2021, Easa's ex-wife, Asra Naseem, accused Easa of domestic violence and threatened to throw their youngest child out the balcony. He had also allegedly hit Naseem and witnesses reported her running out of her apartment crying. Calls were risen by the public and parliamentarians to arrest Easa for domestic violence. Madaveli MP Hussain Firshan said that the Parliament had initiated proceedings to remove Easa as the chair of Social Affairs Committee. However, the Social Affairs Committee lacked the quorum needed to dismiss Easa as the chair. Easa had voluntarily resigned as the chair and denied all the allegations. The Maldivian Democratic Party had also suspended him from the party's parliamentary group and as the spokesperson for the party’s internal committees. The Prosecutor General's Office had filed an arrest warrant for Easa, which the Criminal Court denied to issue.

A meeting of the Human Rights and Gender Committee of the Parliament was held to oversee the case, which was held behind closed doors by request of the Gender Ministry.

Easa was later charged with assault, with Naseem requesting the police to discontinue the case, which they continued despite the request. In 2025, he was acquitted.

=== Parliament brawl ===
In 2023, Easa was accused of assault in a parliamentary brawl between him and MP Ilyas Labeeb. In 2024, during a chaotic vote on President Mohamed Muizzu's cabinet, Easa was knocked down by MP Abdulla Shaheem Abdul Hakeem after sustaining an injury by Easa. MDP defended Easa saying MP Shaheem was injured because of Easa acting in self defence.
