= Ahmed Saleem (Hoarafushi politician) =

Deputy Speaker of the People's Majlis from 2023 to 2024

- އަހުމަދު ސަލީމް
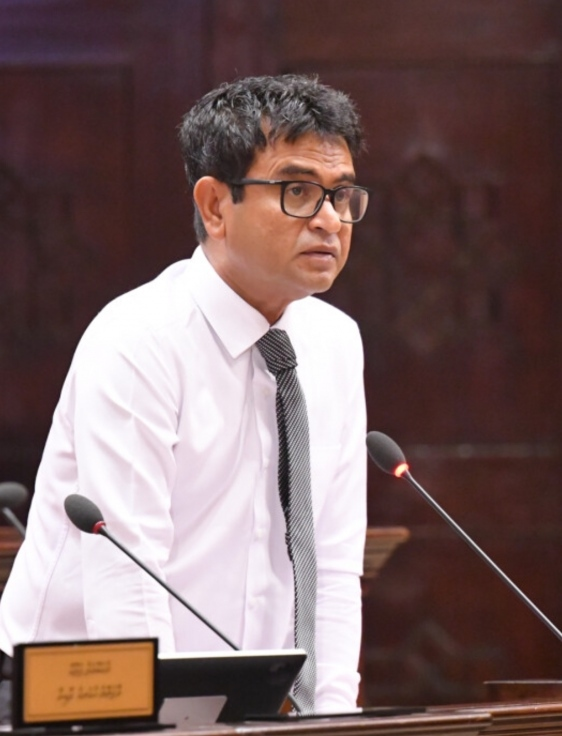
- Saleem in 2023

Deputy Speaker of the People's Majlis
- In office 3 December 2023 – 28 May 2024
- Speaker: Mohamed Aslam
- Preceded by: Eva Abdulla
- Succeeded by: Ahmed Nazim

Member of the People's Majlis
- In office 28 May 2019 – 28 May 2024
- President: Ibrahim Mohamed Solih; Mohamed Muizzu
- Preceded by: Mohamed Ismail
- Succeeded by: Ali Moosa
- Constituency: Hoarafushi

Personal details
- Party: Maldivian Democratic Party

Ahmed Saleem (Dhivehi: އަހުމަދު ސަލީމް) is a Maldivian politician who served as the Deputy Speaker of the People's Majlis from 2023 to 2024. A member of the Maldivian Democratic Party, he served as the member of the People's Majlis from 2019 to 2024.

== Parliament work ==
Saleem submitted many bills to the parliament during his legislative tenure. Some include the resolution to ban foreign vessels fishing in Maldivian waters to ease the difficulties of local fishermen, a resolution calling for the urgency of climate change around the world including low-lying countries like the Maldives.

== Controversies ==
Saleem was embroiled in a controversy when he said that civil servants should not have freedom when signed a contract. Other MPs like Mohamed Ghassan Maumoon and associations such as the Teachers Association of Maldives condemned Saleem and labelled his words as mockery.
