= 2015 May Day protests in the Maldives =

2015 May Day protest in the Maldives
- Date: 1 May 2015
- Location: Malé, Maldives
- Caused by: Presidency of Abdulla Yameen: Sentencing of former President Mohamed Nasheed; Jailing of Mohamed Nazim; Alleged government injustice of the disappearance case of Ahmed Rilwan; Authoritarianism of the government
- Goals: Release of Mohamed Nasheed; Release of Mohamed Nazim; Justice for Ahmed Rilwan

Parties
Maldivian Democratic Party; Jumhooree Party; Adhaalath Party	Government of the Maldives; Maldives Police Service; Maldives National Defence Force

Lead figures
Imran Abdulla; Ali Waheed; Ameen Ibrahim	Abdulla Yameen; Ahmed Adeeb

Number
20,000+	100+

Casualties
- Injuries: ~100
- Arrested: 193
- Detained: 175
- Charged: 30

The 2015 May Day protests in the Maldives were anti-government demonstrations over alleged brutality and governemnt injustice on 1 May 2015.

== Background ==
In March 2015, former President Mohamed Nasheed was sentenced to thirteen years in Maafushi Prison for terrorism. Condemnations followed by Amnesty International and called the trial flawed, which echoed calls from the International Commission of Jurists. The United States Department of State expressed concern over the apparent "lack of appropriate criminal procedure".

Following this, Specialist Operations (SO) police officers started to conduct training exercises ahead of May Day, with the opposition alliance—Maldivian Democratic Party (MDP), Jumhooree Party (JP), and the Adhaalath Party (AP)—calling for President Abdulla Yameen to end brutality for Maldivians and to negotiate with the opposition. Yameen dismissed the call and refused to negotiate. The opposition and the Maldives Police Service has raised fears of violence at the mass government protest, with AP alleging that government ministers are releasing convicts on Friday to incite violence as a pretext to crack down on protesters. In response, President Yameen called on armed forces to protect the administration amid weakening rule of law.

Thousands arrived from the rural atolls of the Maldives, to the capital, Malé, where the protest will be held. Ilyas Labeeb, a former MDP MP claimed that 2000 people have arrived in Malé on 29 April, with an additional 3000 expected to arrive by boat on 1 May. The opposition began a media campaign with the hashtags #EkehFaheh15 (OneFive15) and #AniyaaverikanNinmman (To end tyranny), and began to circulate leaflets on reducing effects of pepper spray and gas. The police have also released several photos and videos of protest control trainings this week.

== Protest ==
An estimate of 20,000 protestors set off on a march throughout Majeedhee Magu in Malé. They stopped at the western edge where opposition leaders spoke to the crowd of Maldivians. MDP Chairperson Ali Waheed stated he would not leave until Nasheed was released and AP President Imran Abdulla led a prayer for courage to remain steadfast and for mercy from the security forces. The protesters demanded the release of Mohamed Nasheed, Mohamed Nazim, justice for missing journalist Ahmed Rilwan, and against the government's authoritarianism.

An announcement came to attend Maghrib (Dusk) prayers at the Islamic Centre. As crowds broke up, police officers blocked off all the roads to the mosque, leading to clashes between protesters and police officers. Armed forces used pepper spray and beat protesters with batons. Waheed and Abdulla turned away from the protesters marching through police lines, which protesters subsequently followed. The protest later became disorganised as many left home and sought refuge at nearby mosques.

== Arrests ==
Police forcefully entered private homes and pepper sprayed residents. They also started to indiscriminately arrest protesters at random, packing them into lorries and driving at high speed. Abdulla, Waheed, and JP's deputy leader Ameen Ibrahim were arrested. Police say that 193 people were arrested in the protest, the largest in the country's history at a single protest. Transparency Maldives noted that many of the people arrested had been innocent by-standers.

== Reception ==
=== Government's response ===
On 2 May, the Maldivian governmnet held a fireworks display and declaring that the protest was a faliure. MPs of the ruling Progressive Party of Maldives branded the protest as an attempted coup, while the government labelled it as an islamic radicalism campaign.

=== Condemnations ===
The Government of Canada condemned the government crackdown of the protest and urged the Maldivian governemnt to "reaffirm its commitment to democracy, human rights and the rule of law". The European Union called on all political parties to open dialogue and condemend the violence on 1 May. Opposition MDP accused the police of disrupting demonstrations by asking for prior notice for protests and banning the use of four-wheeled vehicles. The United Kingdom expressed concern over the arrests of opposition leaders and called for dialogue between the Maldivian government and the opposition parties.

== Aftermath ==
=== Charges and dismissals ===
State-owned enterprises dismissed twelve employees who participated in the protest. The Local Government Authority had also suspeneded seven employees over the protest.

The police released 50 out of the 175 people held in custody, with them arrested on suspicion of obstructing police duty and disobedience to order. 19 people were also released after police failed to present them at court. MDP claims that 90% of the detainees do not have criminal records. Prosecutor General Muhthaz Muhsin stated that he would charge 30 of the 193 people arrested and that around 98 cases were forwarded to the committee on reviewing first time offenders.

Police were also accused of providing false testimony against the protesters. MDP has also accused them of torturing and threatening to kill suspects arrested for assaulting a police officer. MDP MP Ahmed Easa was also allegedly kicked and beaten to the head. The Human Rights Commmission of Maldives investigated claims of police brutality but did not publish findings and Prosecutor General's Office could not find sufficient evidence to pursue cases.

A protester was found guilty of assaulting a policeman and was sentenced to seven years. Two people were also charged with assaulting a police officer and sentences to seven years. Six others were also found guilty assaulting a police officer and was sentenced to five years. AP President Abdulla, JP’s deputy leader Ameen Ibrahim, and JP council member Sobah Rasheed were charged with terrorism, with the latter two leaving the country. Abdulla was sentenced to twelve years before being acquited in 2018. Three detainees sued the state over trial delays, which got rejected by the Civil Court for being out of its jurisdiction.
