= Ahmed Nihan =

Maldivian politician (born 1972)

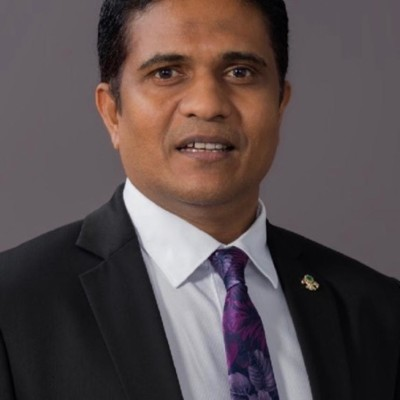
- Official portrait, 2014

Member of the People's Majlis
- In office 28 May 2014 – 28 May 2019
- President: Abdulla Yameen
- Succeeded by: Ahmed Usham
- Constituency: Vilimalé
- In office 28 May 2009 – 28 May 2014
- President: Mohamed Nasheed; Mohamed Waheed Hassan
- Constituency: Villimaafannu

Personal details
- Born: Ahmed Nihan Hussain Manik; 1972 (age 53–54) Malé, Maldives
- Party: Jumhooree Party (2019–present)
- Other political affiliations: People's National Congress (2019); Progressive Party of Maldives (2009–2019)

Ahmed Nihan Hussain Manik (Dhivehi: އަހުމަދު ނިޙާން ހުސައިން މަނިކް) is a Maldivian politician and the former parliament member for the Villimaafannu constituency (2009–2014), Vilimalé constituency (2014–2019). He was the majority Leader of the 18th People's Majlis sitting and the deputy leader of the Progressive Party of Maldives.

He is currently a member of the Jumhooree Party.

== Career ==
Nihan first ran for Progressive Party of Maldives (PPM) for Villimaafannu constituency in 2009, which he later won. During his time as the parliament member for Villimaafannu, he was part of the Social Affairs committee, Economic Affairs Committee, Petition Committee, and the Executive Oversight Committee. After his constituency was dissolved and broken up into new constituencies in the 2014 Maldivian parliamentary election, he ran for the Vilimalé constituency and won. During his time as the parliament member for Vilimalé, he was a member of the Public Accounts Committee. After completing his term as the parliament member for Vilimalé, he left PPM and joined its sister party, People's National Congress (PNC) upon the request of former president Abdulla Yameen on 22 April 2019. He also served as one of PNC's vice presidents. He later left PNC in August 2019 to join the Jumhooree Party (JP).
