= Imran Abdulla =

Maldivian politician

- އިމްރާން ޢަބްދުالله
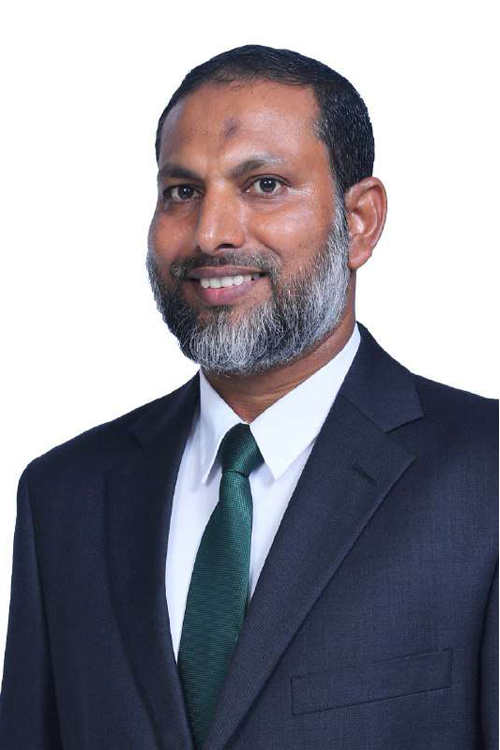
- Official portrait, 2018

Minister of Home Affairs
- In office 2 December 2018 – 17 November 2023
- President: Ibrahim Mohamed Solih
- Preceded by: Azleen Ahmed
- Succeeded by: Ali Ihusaan

Personal details
- Party: Adhaalath Party

Imran Abdulla (Dhivehi: އިމްރާން ޢަބްދުالله) is a Maldivian politician who served as the minister of home affairs of the Maldives from 2018 to 2023. A member of the Adhaalath Party, he currently serves as the party's president since 2011.

== Career ==
Abdulla was appointed as the second president of the Adhaalath Party (AP) in June 2011.

During the 2015 May Day protests in the Maldives, Abdulla was one of the opposition leaders that were arrested. Maldives Police Service said that Abdulla was arrested for "inciting violence amongst protesters with the aim of toppling the government and called for clashes with the police if necessary". Abdulla was later released on 27 May under a travel ban. A few days later, Abdulla was charged with terrorism for allegedly "inciting violence during the May Day anti-government demonstration", which Abdulla denied. The Criminal Court ruled to keep Abdulla in police custody until a verdict is reached. The Maldivian Democratic Party (MDP) condemned Abdulla's charges. Concerns were raised over Abdulla's health as he was suffering from body aches and forced to sleep in a mosquito infested cell with electricity being cut off periodically. This was echoed by the AP as the High Court rejected an appeal to challenge the Criminal Court's decision. A month later, he was transferred to house arrest. A day later, he was transferred back to police custody. After a four-month hiatus, Abdulla's trial resumed in October. He was later transferred back to house arrest, citing the state's violation of an order to provide access to medical care.

Abdulla's trial later resumed in January 2016 after a five-month hiatus. The prosecutors blamed Abdulla for not preventing the clashes between the police and protestors during the 2015 May Day protests. Abdulla wrote to the Supreme Court to ask for a change in judge due to his judge, Judge Abdul Bari Yousuf, being prejudiced against him. NGO Maldivian Democracy Network described Bari's behaviour as "prejudiced" against Abdulla and violating code of conduct for judges, which the NGO filed a complaint to the watchdog Judicial Service Commission. Judge Bari had also barred all of Abdulla's defence witnesses, which the court claimed that they couldn't accept defence witnesses as the lawyer's didn't declare intent to summon witnesses at the trial's outset. In February, Abdulla was transferred back to prison. He was later found guilty and was sentenced to 12 years in prison.

The UK Minister for Asia Hugo Swire called for the release of Abdulla and that it represents a "step backward" for the Maldives, Deputy Spokesperson of the US Department of State Mark Toner called for the country to end politically motivated trials and that Abdulla's trial was deeply flawed, High Commissioner of Canada to the Maldives Shelley Whiting said that Abdulla's sentencing didn't align with the Maldivian government's invitation to multiparty talks, Mohamed Nasheed had said in a tweet that there's no doubt that President Abdulla Yameen didn't influence the outcome of the trial, MDP called it an "absolute injustice" that was committed in violation of the Sharia, Constitution of the Maldives, and international law. The Maldivian government defended Abdulla's imprisonment saying that Abdulla acted "outside of the law, and this cannot be tolerated else chaos will reign".

The Maldivian Democracy Network petitioned the Working Group on Arbitrary Detention on behalf of Abdulla, requesting a judgement declaring Abdulla's terror conviction illegal. Abdulla was transferred back to house arrest for the duration of Ramadan. Abdulla was later transferred back to jail after Ramadan. The Supreme Court rejected an appeal saying that there's no grounds to challenge the High Court's decision to uphold the sentence.

In June 2018, Abdulla was transferred to house arrest due to repair work being done to his cell. After Mohamed Shaheem was chosen by President Abdulla Yameen as his running mate for the 2018 presidential election, Shaheem urged Abdulla to defect to the Progressive Party of Maldives. Abdulla later rejected a presidential pardon saying that he'd "rather be in jail than get into a deal with the government". A request had been made for Abdulla's case to be reviewed by the Supreme Court. In November, the Supreme Court suspended Abdulla's sentence pending a review of his conviction. Following the victory of Ibrahim Mohamed Solih during the 2018 presidential election, Abdulla was appointed by him as the Minister of Home Affairs. The Supreme Court later concluded its review of Abdulla's conviction, overturning it. On 2 December, he resigned as the Home minister following criticism that he carried a sentence. He was later reappointed the same day.

The Elections Commission nulled him as the President of the Adhaalath Party in 2015 but later recognized him as the president in 2018.

In 2019, Abdulla's asset disclosure was marked as "incomplete" by anti-corruption NGO Transparency Maldives. Abdulla declared an MVR2.5 million apartment in a luxury real-estate development in Hulhumalé, which critics argued about where he sourced the finance. Abdulla's colleague, Mohamed Iyaz, said that it was bought by his father-in-law.

Abdulla was reelected as the President of the Adhaalath Party in 2021.

Abdulla announced his candidacy for the Makunudhoo constituency during the 2024 parliamentary election, which he was defeated.
