= Ahmed Usham =

Atterney General of the Maldives since 2023

- އަހުމަދު އުޝާމް
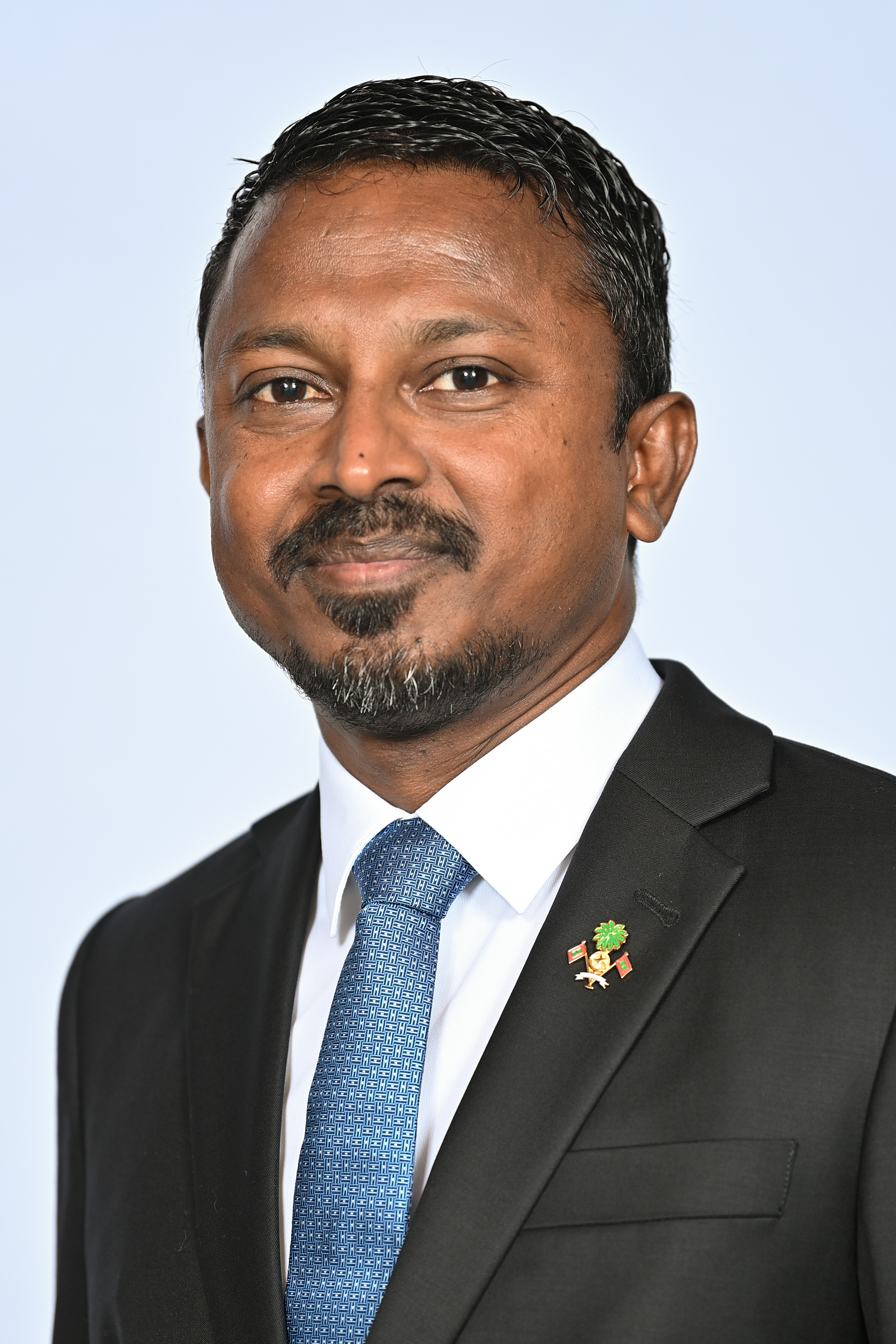

Attorney General
- Incumbent
- Assumed office 17 November 2023
- President: Mohamed Muizzu
- Preceding: Ibrahim Riffath

Member of the People's Majlis
- In office 28 May 2019 – 17 November 2023
- President: Ibrahim Mohamed Solih
- Preceded by: Ahmed Nihan
- Succeeded by: Mohamed Ismail
- Constituency: Vilimalé

Deputy Attorney General
- In office 15 August 2013 – 3 January 2019
- President: Mohamed Waheed Hassan; Abdulla Yameen; Ibrahim Mohamed Solih
- Preceded by: Aishath Bisam
- Succeeded by: Khadeeja Shabeen

Deputy Solicitor General
- In office 15 November 2011 – 15 August 2013
- President: Mohamed Nasheed
- Preceded by: Aishath Bisham

Personal details
- Party: Maldives National Party
- Education: University of the West of England (LLB)

Ahmed Usham (Dhivehi: އަހުމަދު އުޝާމް) is a Maldivian politician and lawyer who is serving as the Attorney General of the Maldives since 2023. Earlier, he served as Deputy Solicitor General at the Attorney General's Office, and as Deputy Attorney General. He currently serving as the Maldives National Party's (MNP) Vice President.

== Education ==
Usham graduated the University of the West of England with a Bachelor of Law.

== Career ==
Usham became a Deputy Solicitor General on 15 November 2011 during the Nasheed administration. He was later appointed to Deputy Attorney General by President Mohamed Waheed where he stayed for 6 years before resigning on 3 January 2019.

He joined the Maldives National Party in 2019 and became the Vice President of the party, he also became the MP for Villimalé constituency, where he later resigned to become the incumbent Attorney General being appointed by President Muizzu. He was later rejected by the People's Majlis but was later re-appointed by President Muizzu.
