= 2005 Maldivian parliamentary election =

- 22 January 2005
- 42 of the 50 seats in the People's Majlis
Party	Vote %	Seats
Pro-government	32.29	20
MDP-endorsed	31.10	18
Independents	36.61	4
This lists parties that won seats. See the complete results below.

Parliamentary elections were held in the Maldives on 22 January 2005. At the time of the elections political parties were banned, so all candidates ran as independents. Supporters of President Maumoon Abdul Gayoom emerged as the largest group in the People's Majlis.

== Background ==
The elections were originally planned for 31 December 2004, but were postponed following the Indian Ocean earthquake and tsunami on 25 December which severely affected the islands.

== Campaign ==
Whilst all 149 candidates ran as independents, their political affiliation were well known.

== Conduct ==
Twenty opposition supporters were arrested on election day after recording election officials attempting to close a polling station whilst there were still voters waiting to cast their vote.

== Results ==
Supporters of the Government emerged as the largest group in the People's Majlis, although the exact numbers were unclear; the opposition Maldivian Democratic Party claimed government supporters had won only 22 seats to their 18, whilst the government claimed to have 30 MPs and the MDP only eight.

The International Foundation for Electoral Systems and the Minivan Daily reported that pro-Government candidates won 20 seats.

Party	Votes	%	Seats
Supporters of the Government	71,558	32.29	20
Endorsed by the Maldivian Democratic Party	68,931	31.10	18
Independents	81,125	36.61	4
Presidential appointees			8
Total	221,614	100.00	50
Registered voters/turnout	156,267	–	
Source: IFES

== Aftermath ==
Following the elections, political parties were legalised on 2 July 2005.
