= Umar Naseer =

Maldivian politician (born 1967)

- ޢުމަރު ނަޞީރު
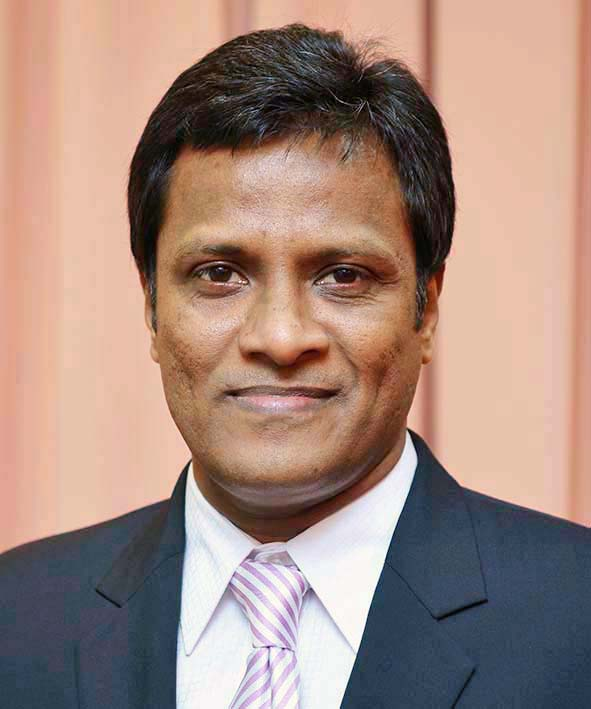
- Naseer in 2016

Minister of Home Affairs
- In office 19 November 2013 – 21 June 2016
- President: Abdulla Yameen
- Preceded by: Ahmed Shafeeu (acting); Mohamed Jameel Ahmed
- Succeeded by: Ahmed Zuhoor

Personal details
- Born: 27 April 1967 (age 59) Henveiru, Malé, Sultanate of the Maldive Islands
- Party: Independent (2018–present)
- Other political affiliations: Islamic Democratic Party (2008–2010); Dhivehi Rayyithunge Party (2010–2010); Progressive Party of Maldives (2010–2013; 2015–2017) Jumhooree Party (2013–2015; 2017–2018)
- Children: 4
- Education: University of Hull

Umar Naseer (born 27 April 1967) is a Maldivian politician who served as the Minister of Home Affairs from 2013 to 2016. Naseer ran as an independent candidate in both the 2008 and 2023 presidential elections.

== Early life and education ==
Naseer was born on 27 April 1967 in Henveiru, Malé, Sultanate of the Maldive Islands (present Maldives). He did his Master of Business Administration at the University of Hull. He did military training and police training in Japan and the Maldives as well as leadership training at Harvard University.

== Political career ==
In 2008, Naseer ran in the 2008 Maldivian presidential election representing the Islamic Democratic Party (IDP). He received 2,472 votes and was unable to go into the second round.

In 2010, Naseer left the IDP stating that it had no future and joined the Dhivehi Rayyithunge Party (DRP) in a ceremony and was welcomed by then-leader of DRP Maumoon Abdul Gayoom.

In September, during when Naseer was serving as the Deputy Leader of the party, the DRP's council filed a case against Naseer to the Disciplinary Committee for forging a press release and for causing division in the party. This resulted in Naseer being dismissed from the party and being removed from the party's membership list.

In 2011, Naseer joined the Progressive Party of Maldives (PPM).

In 2013, Naseer declared war within the party after his defeat in the party's presidential primaries for the 2013 presidential election. He called the primaries rigged by purposefully invalidating the ballots by ticking Abdulla Yameen's name. PPM's Council launched a case to its disciplinary committee after Naseer refused to apologize for calling the primaries rigged. In April, he was dismissed from the party. Naseer contested this decision and submitted a case to the Civil Court to seek a ruling. A case was filed by another PPM member to the Civil Court to invalidate the primary but was dismissed on a technicality. Naseer later personally resubmitted the case which the court later ruled in the favour of PPM.

Following this, Naseer joined the Jumhooree Party (JP) in the same year.

In November, Naseer was appointed as a member of Yameen's cabinet as the Minister of Home Affairs. Naseer was appointed on a JP ticket but switched back to PPM in September 2015. In 2016, Naseer resigned as minister. In 2017, Naseer rejoined the JP but later left in 2018 to run in the presidential election that year.

He ran as an independent candidate in the 2023 Maldivian presidential election, finishing fourth out of eight candidates.

== Controversies ==
Naseer's career in the Maldives Police Service ended under contentious circumstances. As a Sergeant, he was allegedly expelled for torturing a detainee during an interrogation. In an exclusive interview with Minivan News in London, Abdulla Mahir, a torture victim who gained notoriety in July 2007 after throwing an egg at Maumoon Abdul Gayoom, claimed that while in police custody, he was tortured by Naseer and his team. Mahir stated that the torture left him permanently disabled.

Naseer had advocated for arming police officers with pistols and guns. At a ceremony marking the 82nd anniversary of the Maldives Police Service, he suggested “narrowing constitutional rights” for those arrested by the police and eliminating the requirement to present an arrested suspect before a judge within 24 hours.

In his 2023 presidential bid announcement, Naseer assured that his administration would implement the death penalty, which he claimed would establish peace and order across the nation. He further stated that all drug traffickers would be sentenced to death, and prisoners currently serving life sentences would be executed.

In addition to his other policies, Naseer has been a vocal advocate for the implementation of Shariah law in the Maldives. He believes that incorporating Shariah principles into the legal system will help establish a more just and moral society. His vision includes strict adherence to Islamic laws, which he argues will bring about peace and order.

=== Arrest and charges ===
During the 2011–2013 Maldives political crisis, Naseer was arrested while protesting against the government.

In 2014, Naseer was charged with disobedience to an order after he was accused of calling for volunteers to breach the Maldives National Defence Force's headquarters during the detention of judge Abdulla Mohamed. Naseer failed to attend court three times to answer his charges and an arrest warrant was issued. The Home Ministry said that he isn't evading as he was in the Netherlands. The High Court rejected Naseer's appeal to overturn his arrest warrant claiming that warrants can't be appealed. The case was concluded in July 2014.
