= 2023 Maldivian presidential election =

- 9 September 2023 (first round); 30 September 2023 (second round)
- Turnout: 79.85% (first round); 87.31% (second round)
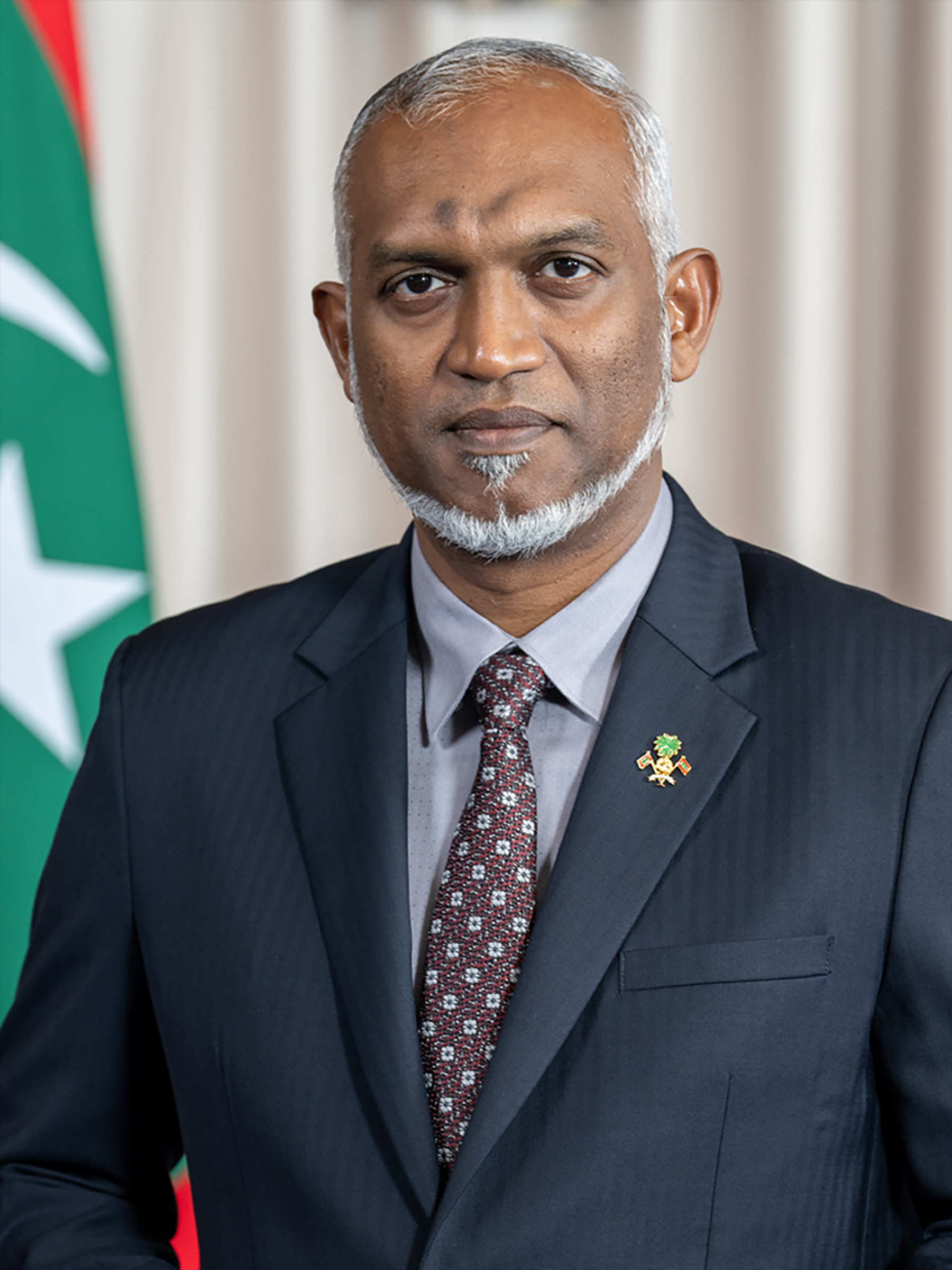

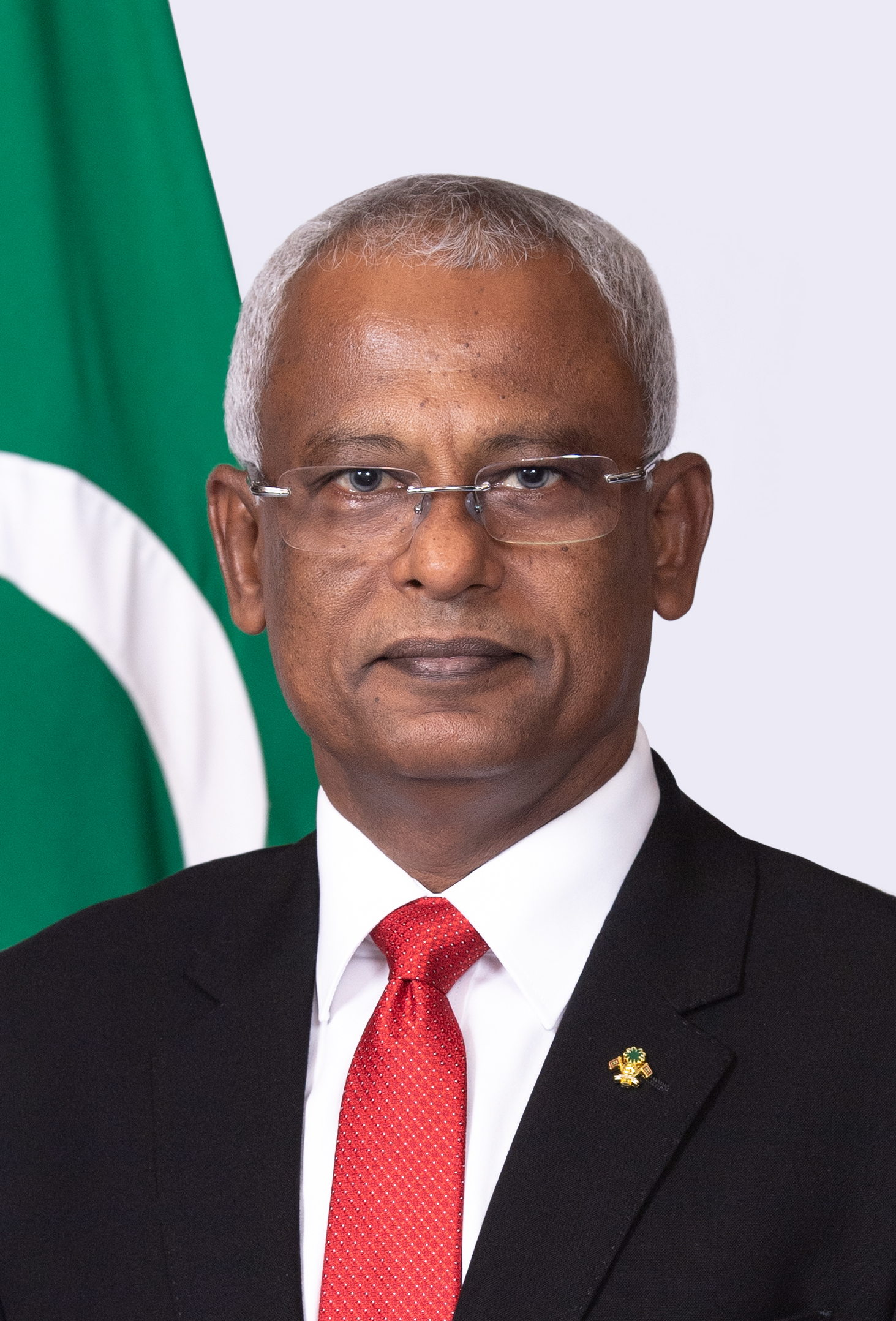
Nominee	Mohamed Muizzu	Ibrahim Mohamed Solih
Party	PNC	MDP
Running mate	Hussain Mohamed Latheef	Mohamed Aslam
Popular vote	129,159	109,868
Percentage	54.04%	45.96%
- Second round results by atoll
President before election
Ibrahim Mohamed Solih
MDP
Elected President
Mohamed Muizzu
PNC

Presidential elections were held in the Maldives on Saturday, 9 September 2023, with a second round held on 30 September. Incumbent president Ibrahim Mohamed Solih was seeking re-election, after defeating the-then Speaker of the People's Majlis Mohamed Nasheed in the Maldivian Democratic Party primaries. People's National Congress candidate and Malé mayor Mohamed Muizzu won the election with 54% of the votes, defeating Ibrahim Mohamed Solih and becoming President-elect of the Maldives. It was the fourth consecutive election in which a Maldivian president failed to win reelection, the last to do so having been Maumoon Abdul Gayoom, who ran unopposed, in 2003.

== Background ==
Former president Abdulla Yameen of the Progressive Party of Maldives (PPM) had announced his candidacy for president, but due to his sentencing in 2018 to 11 years in prison for corruption and money laundering due to his connection to the Maldives Marketing and Public Relations Corporation scandal he is ineligible to appear on the ballot. PPM's vice president Mohamed Muizzu purportedly ran on his behalf as a nominee of the PNC, which he also joined before the election. Abdulla Yameen opted to support Muizzu's candidacy after previously calling for a boycott of the election.

Former Minister of Defence and National Security, Mohamed Nazim of the Maldives National Party announced his candidacy for president. The Jumhooree Party announced that they will put forth candidates as well. Ilyas Labeeb of the newly formed The Democrats nominated himself as a candidate for president. Independents Ahmed Faris Maumoon, son of Maumoon Abdul Gayoom, Umar Naseer and Hassan Zameel also announced their candidacies for president. This presidential election had the most recorded candidates since the first direct contested election in 2008, where six candidates participated.

As no candidate received over 50% of the vote in the first round, the top two finishers, Muizzu and incumbent Solih, moved on to a runoff.

== Electoral system ==
The Maldives has a presidential system of government where the president is both the head of state and government. The president is elected via direct-vote every five years and can only be elected for a maximum of two terms, which is the limit allowed by the constitution. The law and constitution of the Maldives grants its citizens the right to vote and run for public office at the age of 18.

In the elections, the candidate who receives a majority (more than 50%) of the valid votes cast is elected president. If no candidate receives an outright majority, the election then proceeds to a runoff (or second round), which are mandated to be held no less than 21 days following the initial election day between the two front runners. The candidate who receives the majority of the vote is then elected president. The official results are announced by the Elections Commission and published in the government gazette within seven days of the voting day of the presidential elections.

== Candidates ==
=== Maldivian Democratic Party ===
The Maldivian Democratic Party held primary elections to choose its presidential candidate on 28 January 2023. Nasheed accused Solih of trying to rig the presidential primary. The Chairperson of Maldivian Democratic Party, Fayyaz Ismail, defended the primaries, reiterating that they will be held in accordance with the party constitution.

- Ibrahim Mohamed Solih, incumbent president and leader of Maldivian Democratic Party.
- Mohamed Nasheed, the-then Speaker of the People's Majlis, former Maldivian president, former president of Maldivian Democratic Party and leader of Democrats.

Candidate	Votes	%
Ibrahim Mohamed Solih	19,096	61.40
Mohamed Nasheed	12,005	38.60
Total	31,101	100.00
Source: ThePrint

==== Progressive Congress Coalition ====
Nominated by the Progressive Party of Maldives and People's National Congress.

- Abdulla Yameen, former president and leader of Progressive Party of Maldives.

However, since the Maldivian Criminal Court sentenced former president Yameen to 11 years in prison, Yameen was disqualified from running the presidential election.

Nominated by People's National Congress's as a 'Backup' candidacy.

- Mohamed Muizzu, the-then Mayor of Malé and former Minister of Housing and Infrastructure.

PNC's president Abdul Raheem said that he would withdraw the candidacy if the Maldivian Supreme Court allowed Yameen to compete in the upcoming elections, which ended up not happening.

==== The Democrats ====
Nominated by The Democrats, a newly formed political party from the rapidly unfolding power struggle between two pivotal figures in the Maldivian Democratic Party — incumbent president Ibrahim Mohamed Solih and former president Mohamed Nasheed.

- Ilyas Labeeb, Hulhudhoo 19th Parliament Member (MP) of the People's Majlis.

==== Jumhooree Party ====
Finalized by Jumhooree Party's council meeting.

- Qasim Ibrahim, former Speaker of the People's Majlis and leader of Jumhooree Party.

==== Maldives National Party ====
Nominated by Maldives National Party.

- Mohamed Nazim, former Minister of Defence and National Security and leader of Maldives National Party.

==== Ahmed Faris Maumoon (independent candidate) ====
Nominated by himself as an independent candidate.

- Ahmed Faris Maumoon, MP for Dhiggaru constituency and the son of former president Maumoon Abdul Gayoom.

==== Umar Naseer (independent candidate) ====
Nominated himself as an independent candidate.

- Umar Naseer, former Minister of Home Affairs.

==== Hassan Zameel (independent candidate) ====
Nominated himself as an independent candidate.

- Hassan Zameel, former Deputy Minister of Defense.

== Campaign ==
A key campaign topic was the Maldives' position with respect to China and India. The incumbent Ibrahim Mohamed Solih campaigned on an "India-first" policy, aiming to strengthen ties with the Maldives' geographical and cultural neighbour. On the opposite side, Mohamed Muizzu, adopting the slogan "India out", called for Indian military personnel stationed on the archipelago to leave, while campaigning for closer relations with China. This kept in line with the policies of former president Abdulla Yameen, founder of the People's National Congress, under whom the Maldives joined China's Belt and Road Initiative.

Muizzu also campaigned on freeing Yameen, at the time serving an 11-year prison sentence for bribery and money laundering, pushing for the former president to be transferred to house arrest. Jailed on the same island where he arrested several of his political opponents, Yameen had requested to be moved home for health reasons two weeks prior to the election's second round.

== Second round ==
Muizzu won 46% of the votes in the first round, compared to 39% for Solih. Media sources attributed this result to rivalry between President Solih and former President Mohamed Nasheed, whose chosen candidate Ilyas Labeeb won 7%. As neither Muizzu nor Solih received an absolute majority of the votes cast, a second round was scheduled for 30 September.

Umar Naseer and Ahmed Faris Maumoon did not endorse either candidate for the runoff. Mohamed Nazim endorsed Muizzu. While Qasim Ibrahim asked his supporters to vote as they pleased, his running mate Ameen Ibrahim and his party secretariat endorsed Solih.

=== Results by Atoll ===
Results by atoll and geographical area (2023 presidential election, second round)
Atoll / area	Ibrahim Mohamed Solih (MDP)		Mohamed Muizzu (PNC)		Total valid votes
Atoll / area	Votes	%	Votes	%	Total valid votes
HA	5,673	44.79%	6,992	55.21%	12,665
HDh	6,634	47.81%	7,241	52.19%	13,875
Sh	4,793	46.73%	5,463	53.27%	10,256
N	4,484	46.78%	5,101	53.22%	9,585
R	5,927	43.42%	7,722	56.58%	13,649
B	4,046	45.44%	4,858	54.56%	8,904
Lh	3,834	48.78%	4,025	51.22%	7,859
K	3,818	42.24%	5,220	57.76%	9,038
AA	2,781	51.00%	2,672	49.00%	5,453
ADh	3,268	48.85%	3,422	51.15%	6,690
V	801	49.14%	829	50.86%	1,630
M	1,937	45.30%	2,339	54.70%	4,276
F	1,559	42.83%	2,081	57.17%	3,640
Dh	2,081	40.51%	3,056	59.49%	5,137
Th	3,981	45.40%	4,787	54.60%	8,768
L	4,516	42.27%	6,168	57.73%	10,684
GA	3,731	43.91%	4,766	56.09%	8,497
GDh	5,061	44.66%	6,271	55.34%	11,332
Fuvahmulah City (Gn)	3,066	43.76%	3,941	56.24%	7,007
Addu City (S)	9,909	54.81%	8,171	45.19%	18,080
Malé City	22,312	44.32%	28,033	55.68%	50,345
Industrial areas	78	42.39%	106	57.61%	184
Jails	476	32.74%	978	67.26%	1,454
Overseas	2,464	52.46%	2,233	47.54%	4,697
Resorts	2,638	49.57%	2,684	50.43%	5,322
National total	109,868	45.96%	129,159	54.04%	239,027

== Results ==
Candidate	Running mate	Party	First round		Second round	
Candidate	Running mate	Party	Votes	%	Votes	%
Mohamed Muizzu	Hussain Mohamed Latheef	People's National Congress	101,635	46.06	129,159	54.04
Ibrahim Mohamed Solih	Mohamed Aslam	Maldivian Democratic Party	86,161	39.05	109,868	45.96
Ilyas Labeeb	Hussain Amr	The Democrats	15,839	7.18		
Umar Naseer	Maaz Saleem	Independent	6,343	2.87		
Qasim Ibrahim	Ameen Ibrahim	Jumhooree Party	5,460	2.47		
Ahmed Faris Maumoon	Abdul Sattar Yoosuf	Independent	2,979	1.35		
Mohamed Nazim	Ahmed Adheel Naseer	Maldives National Party	1,907	0.86		
Hassan Zameel	Mariyam Aleem	Independent	327	0.15		
Total			220,651	100.00	239,027	100.00
Valid votes			220,651	97.86	239,027	96.81
Invalid/blank votes			4,835	2.14	7,888	3.19
Total votes			225,486	100.00	246,915	100.00
Registered voters/turnout			282,395	79.85	282,804	87.31
Source: Elections Commission, Elections Commission

== Reactions ==
- Maldives – Incumbent president Ibrahim Mohamed Solih conceded defeat, congratulating his opponent for his victory, as well as the Maldivian people for participating in a peaceful and democratic process.
- USA – US. Ambassador to the Maldives Hugo Yon congratulated Muizzu, looking forward to working with the President-Elect to further strengthen U.S.-Maldives relations that began in 1966.
- Japan – The Japanese Embassy of the Maldives congratulated Muizzu and Hussain, Japan expresses sincere wish for the peace and prosperity of the people of Maldives and reiterates their determination to working closely together to take Japan-Maldives relations to greater heights.
- China – President Xi Jinping has extended a congratulatory message to Dr. Mohamed Muizzu, the newly elected President of the Maldives, emphasizing the deep-rooted ties between China-Maldives relations.
- India – Prime Minister Narendra Modi congratulated Muizzu and conveyed his "good wishes for the strengthening of democracy, peace and prosperity in the country."
- Pakistan – The Caretaker Prime Minister Anwar ul Haq Kakar congratulated Dr. Mohamed Muizzu on his victory in the presidential elections of Maldives. He further added that he was looking forward to working with him for further strengthening Pak-Maldives relations and regional cooperation.
- Saudi Arabia – King Salman bin Abdulaziz and Crown Prince Mohamed bin Salman, has sent a cable of congratulations to His Excellency Dr. Mohamed Muizzu on the occasion of winning the presidential elections in the Republic of the Maldives.
- Morocco – The Moroccan Embassy of Maldives congratulated President-Elect Muizzu and Vice President-Elect Hussain, looking forward to the bilateral ties to new heights increasing people and people connection between the two nations.
- Georgia – The Consulate of Georgia in Maldives sent a warm congratulations to newly elected president Dr. Mohamed Muizzu
- Sri Lanka – President Ranil Wickremesinghe extended his warm congratulations to Dr. Mohamed Muizzu, the newly elected President of the Maldives, solidifying the bonds of friendship and cooperation between the two countries.

== Aftermath ==
On the day following the election, Mohamed Muizzu's demands for the liberation of Abdulla Yameen were successful, with the former president being transferred to house arrest.
