= The Democrats (Maldives) =

Political party in the Maldives

The Democrats ދަ ޑިމޮކްރެޓްސް
- Abbreviation: DEMS
- Founded: May 21, 2023
- Dissolved: 3 June 2026
- Split from: Maldivian Democratic Party
- Youth wing: The Young Democrats
- Ideology: Liberal conservatism Pro-parliamentarism; Environmentalism
- Political position: Centre-right
- Colors: Baby Blue, Black, White
- People's Majlis: 0 / 93

Website
- thedemocrats.mv

The Democrats (Dhivehi: ދަ ޑިމޮކްރެޓްސް, romanized: dha dimokrets) was a political party in the Maldives, formed by a faction within the Maldivian Democratic Party amid a rift between members who supported Mohamed Nasheed. Some of their members were pending expulsion from the party after voting against the party-line and voting to oust sitting cabinet ministers of President Solih's cabinet.

The party nominated Ilyas Labeeb and Hussain Amr for its presidential ticket in the 2023 Maldivian presidential election.

== History ==
=== Founding ===
The party was founded in 2023 by 12 members who were originally members of a faction in Maldivian Democratic Party (MDP) loyal to Mohamed Nasheed.

The members of the party favour a parliamentary system of government, which was what initially caused the rift between the group, originally within the Maldivian Democratic Party. The rift then became more apparent after the members of the group started openly criticizing the MDP government and several cabinet ministers.

The group was originally a sizable minority within the party, but were unable to secure the party's Chairperson post and were later unable to secure the MDP's ticket for the 2023 election after running Mohamed Nasheed against the president Ibrahim Mohamed Solih in the party primaries.

After party leadership threatened to oust key members of their group from the MDP, a group of members formed The Democrats. During the initial party formation, Mohamed Nasheed was still a part of the MDP, a party he played a key role in founding. Despite this, Nasheed was actively involved in The Democrats’ political activities and campaign.

He left the Maldivian Democratic Party soon after on July 17, 2023, noting that “it was not the right thing to do.” He also later established that he wishes to “tear down the party.”

=== Leadership resignation ===
In 2025, Hussain Amru, Mohamed Shifaz, Ali Azim and then-president of The Democrats Hassan Latheef, who were all founding members of the party, resigned from the party and re-joined MDP.

=== Dissolution ===
On 17 June 2025, The Democrats passed a resolution in a meeting to dissolve the party, after Mohamed Nasheed,Eva Abdulla, and other Democrat leadership decided to rejoin the Maldivian Democratic Party (MDP). The MDP's chairperson Fayyaz Ismail said the Maldivian Democratic Party is ready to "sincerely and wholeheartedly" welcome Mohamed Nasheed and members of The Democrats as they prepare to return to the party. The Maldivian Democratic Party held the welcoming ceremony for Nasheed and other Democrats in Sultan Park on 23 June 2025.

Other Democrats didn't want to join the MDP because they didn't share Nasheed's vision of reunification.

On 3 June 2026, the Elections Commission had dissolved the party after the party didn't meet the 3000 member requirement.

== Election results ==
=== President elections ===
Election	Party candidate	Running mate	Votes	%	Votes	%	Result
Election	Party candidate	Running mate	First Round		Second Round		Result
2023	Ilyas Labeeb	Hussain Amru	15,539	7.07%	—N/a		Lost ✗

=== People's Majlis elections ===
Year	Party Leader	Votes	Vote %	Position	Seats	+/–
2024	Mohamed Nasheed	4635	2.20	▲3rd	0 / 93	New
