= Maldives National Party =

Political party in the Maldives

Maldives National Party މޯލްޑިވްސް ނޭޝަނަލް ޕާޓީ
- Abbreviation: MNP
- Leader: Mohamed Nazim
- Secretary General: Ahmed Shinaz
- Parliamentary Leader: Abdulla Riyaz
- Founded: July 2021
- Registered: 25 October 2021
- Headquarters: 1st Floor; Majeedhee Magu, Ma.Kelaavee, Male’ 20241, Maldives
- Youth wing: MNP Youth Wing
- Women's wing: MNP Women's Wing
- Membership (June 2026): 4,183
- Ideology: Islamic democracy Nationalism
- Political position: Centre-right
- People's Majlis: 1 / 93

Website
- www.mnp.mv

The Maldives National Party (Dhivehi: މޯލްޑިވްސް ނޭޝަނަލް ޕާޓީ, MNP), is a political party in Maldives with a total membership of 7,519 as of 19 September 2024.

MNP was invited by the ruling Maldivian Democratic Party in October 2021 to join them in government.

The Maldives National Party declared itself an opposition party to the ruling MDP coalition and has announced that they will be contesting in the 2023 Maldivian presidential election.

== History ==
3 parliament members (Col. Rtd. Mohamed Nazim, MP Abdulla Riyaz and MP Ahmed Usham) created MNP.

On 26 December 2021 MNP presented its member Abdul Hannan Idrees with the primary ticket to contest for the vacant Komandoo constituency by-election.

== Platform ==
During his 2023 presidential candidacy, Nazim pledged to build more guest homes in Ihavandhoo, to establish a modern ice plant there, and to abolish clemency and commutating sentences for sex crimes.

== Election results ==
=== President elections ===
Election	Party candidate	Running mate	Votes	%	Votes	%	Result
Election	Party candidate	Running mate	First Round		Second Round		Result
2023	Mohamed Nazim	Ahmed Adheel Naseer	1,896	0.86%	—N/a		Lost ✗

=== People's Majlis elections ===
Year	Party Leader	Votes	Vote %	Position	Seats	+/–
2024	Mohamed Nazim	1,060	0.50	▲7th	1 / 93	New
