= Hassan Zameel =

Maldivian politician

- ހަސަން ޒަމީލް
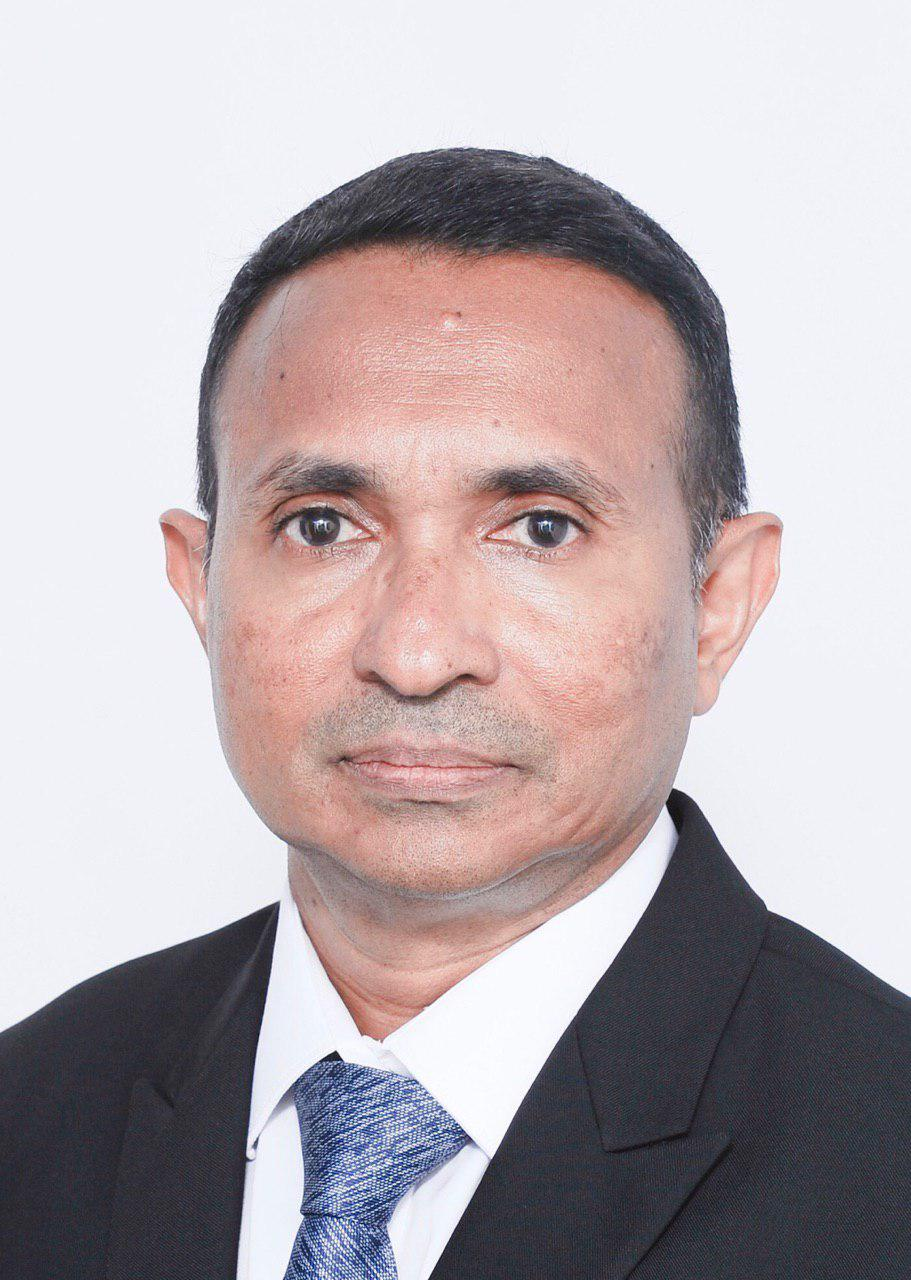
- Official portrait, 2019

Deputy Minister of the Ministry of Defence
- In office 20 February 2019 – August 2023
- President: Ibrahim Mohamed Solih
- Preceded by: Fathimath Thasneem
- Succeeded by: Fathimath Mizna Ali

Deputy Director General at the Ministry of Tourism
- In office 2013–2018
- President: Abdulla Yameen

Deputy Director at the Ministry of Tourism, Arts and Culture
- In office 2012–2013
- President: Mohamed Waheed

Personal details
- Spouse: Mariyam Aleem
- Children: Ahmed Mahran Zameel and Aishath Maleehaa Zameel
- Education: Maldives National University (LL.M.)

Hassan Zameel (Dhivehi: ހަސަން ޒަމީލް) is a Maldivian politician. He is a former Deputy Defence Minister and was an independent candidate in the 2023 Maldivian presidential election, with his wife Mariyam Aleem as his running mate. His policy positions included promoting voluntary migration, allowances for stay-at-home parents, implementing congestion control measures in Malé.

== Education ==
He has a Master of Laws from the Maldives National University.

== Career ==
He started his career as the deputy director at the Ministry of Tourism, Arts and Culture during the presidency of Mohamed Waheed Hassan Manik. Later, he was the Deputy Director General at the Ministry of Tourism during the presidency of Abdulla Yameen Abdul Gayoom. Later, he ran as an independent candidate during the 2023 Maldivian presidential election. The Elections Commission had imposed fines for their financial statements not meeting standards, later the Commission recalled their decision to fine him after the Civil Court ruling.

== Family ==
Zameel is married to Mariyam Aleem and has a son named Ahmed Mahran Zameel. And a daughter named Aishath Maleehaa Zameel.
