= 2007 Maldivian constitutional referendum =

Fifth Maldivian constitutional referendum

- 18 August 2007

Results
Choice	Votes	%
Presidential system	95,619	62.04%
Parliamentary system	58,504	37.96%
Valid votes	154,123	98.87%
Invalid or blank votes	1,767	1.13%
Total votes	155,890	100.00%
Registered voters/turnout	199,841	78.01%

A constitutional referendum was held in the Maldives on 18 August 2007 to decide on whether the country should have a presidential system or a parliamentary system. President of the Maldives Maumoon Abdul Gayoom supported a presidential system while the opposition Maldivian Democratic Party favoured a parliamentary system.

Official results showed the presidential system winning over 60% support. Gayoom called the result a "massive endorsement" and confirmed that he would be a candidate in the 2008 presidential election. The opposition alleged that the referendum was rigged.

== Results ==
Choice	Votes	%
Presidential system	95,619	62.04
Parliamentary system	58,504	37.96
Total	154,123	100.00
Valid votes	154,123	98.87
Invalid/blank votes	1,767	1.13
Total votes	155,890	100.00
Registered voters/turnout	199,841	78.01
Source: Haveeru Daily
