= Ilyas Labeeb =

Maldivian politician

- އިލްޔާސް ލަބީބް
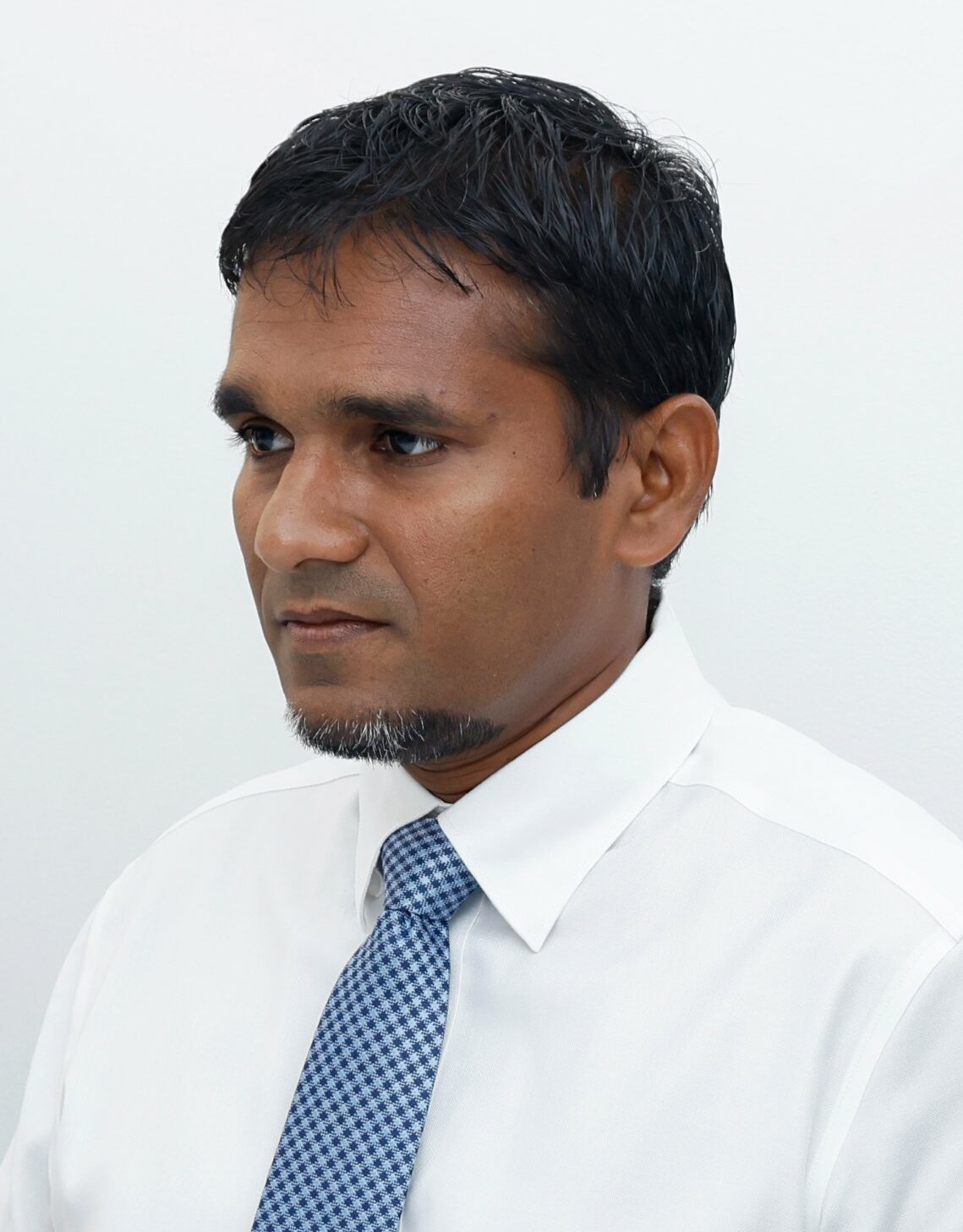
- Labeeb in 2023

Member of Parliament
- In office 28 May 2019 – 28 May 2024
- Preceded by: Mohamed Shahid
- Succeeded by: Mohamed Shahid
- Constituency: Hulhudhoo
- In office 28 May 2009 – 28 May 2014
- Succeeded by: Mohamed Shahid
- Constituency: Hulhudhoo

Personal details
- Born: 29 June 1979 (age 46) Hulhudhoo, Addu City, Maldives
- Party: The Democrats
- Other political affiliations: Maldivian Democratic Party

Ilyas Labeeb (Dhivehi: އިލްޔާސް ލަބީބް; born 29 June 1979) is a Maldivian politician and former member of parliament.

== Early life ==
Ilyas Labeeb was born in Hulhudhoo on the 29 June 1979.

== Political career ==
Ilyas was nominated as The Democrats' candidate for the 2023 Maldivian presidential election, along with Hussain Amru as his running mate, and came third in the first round.

== Electoral Performance ==
2014 Maldivian parliamentary election - Hulhudhoo
Party	Candidate	Votes	%	±%
PPM	Mohamed Shahid	1,044	49.4	
MDP	Ilyas Labeeb	960	45.4	
Independent	Ibrahim Shukree	54	2.5	
Independent	Dr. Ibrahim Didi	41	1.9	
Majority		84	4	
Turnout		2114	78.8	
Registered electors		2,681		
PPM gain from MDP		Swing		

== Business Ventures ==
He developed the family owned computer repair business MegaChip Computers into one of the largest information technology companies in the Maldives, and currently serves as Director.
