= Islamic Democratic Party (Maldives) =

Political party in the Maldives from 2005 to 2013

Islamic Democratic Party އިސްލާމިކް ޑިމޮކްރެޓިކް ޕާޓީ
- Abbreviation: IDP
- Leader: Hassan Zareer
- Founded: July 2, 2005
- Dissolved: 2013
- Ideology: Islamism; Islamic democracy

The Islamic Democratic Party (IDP) was an Islamic political party from the Maldives. On 2 June 2005, the country's 50 member parliament voted unanimously to allow and operate political parties in Maldives. IDP subsequently submitted its registration and was registered. IDP was officially granted registration on 12 December 2005. The founding members are Umar Naseer, Mohamed Haneef, Ahmed Inaz, Mohamed Ibrahim Didi, Abdulla Waheed and Mahamed Hassan Manik.

Umar Naseer was a Police officer respected by his superiors and subordinates alike. He was trained in UK in other countries. He operates a security firm called Alarms Pvt Ltd. and also Whale Submarine, which is a tourist submarine for enthusiasts who wants to look into the underwater world of Maldives.

Mohamed Haneef was a police officer, who resigned from the military and began his political career. He is well known among Maldivians as the person who organised two strikes against then President Ibrahim Nasir in 1975.

The party was dissolved in 2013.

== See also ==
- List of Islamic political parties
