= 2008 Maldivian presidential election =

- 8 October 2008 (first round); 28 October 2008 (second round)
- Turnout: 85.38% (first round); 86.58% (second round)
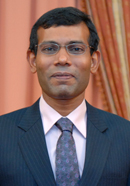

| Nominee | Mohamed Nasheed | Maumoon Abdul Gayoom |
| Party | MDP | DRP |
| Running mate | Mohamed Waheed Hassan | Ahmed Thasmeen Ali |
| Popular vote | 97,222 | 82,121 |
| Percentage | 54.21% | 45.79% |
- Second round results by atoll
President before election
Maumoon Abdul Gayoom
DRP
Elected President
Mohamed Nasheed
MDP

Presidential elections were held in the Maldives on 8 and 23 October 2008, the first democratic elections in the country. As no candidate won a majority in the first round, a runoff was held on 28 October between the two candidates among the contestants who received the most votes, incumbent president Maumoon Abdul Gayoom and Mohamed Nasheed, who received the second most votes after Gayoom in the first round. Nasheed was elected to the office after winning a majority in the runoff, unseating incumbent president Gayoom who held the office for six terms, lasting three decades.

== Background ==
The election was initially planned to be held on 4 October, but had to be delayed after the Majlis (national assembly) did not pass necessary reforms on time.

The incumbent, President Gayoom, in power since 1978, ran for another five-year term. According to the new Constitution, which came into effect on 7 August 2008, Gayoom had served the maximum number of terms allowed (two). He argued that since the election was held under a new constitution, the previous terms did not count toward the limit. The Supreme Court agreed that the limited terms were to be served "under this Constitution" and that Gayoom was therefore eligible to run in the election.

On 25 August 2008 the Maldives National Congress and the Adhaalath Party announced that they would support Jumhooree Party (Republican Party) candidate Qasim Ibrahim. On September 3, 2008, the six candidates participated in a televised debate.

== Electoral system ==
The Maldives has a presidential system of government where the president is both head of state and government. Once in office, they could be re-elected to a second 5-year term, which is the limit allowed by the Constitution.

In the Maldives, the president is elected by a majority or more than fifty (50%) percent of the votes cast. When a candidate does not receive a majority of the votes, the election then proceeds to a runoff (or second round), which are mandated to be held no less than 21 days following the election. In a runoff round, the candidates among the two who receives fifty (50%) percent of the valid votes cast, are elected to the office of the president.

The official results of the voting are announced by the Elections Commission and published in the government gazette within seven days of the voting day of the presidential elections.

== Conduct ==
=== First round ===
There were 208,252 eligible voters in the first round, roughly 60% of the population. There were a total 396 polling stations throughout the country. Additionally, registered Maldivians living in Colombo, Thiruvananthapuram, Kuala Lumpur and Singapore were permitted to vote in Maldivian embassies and consulates.

Voters went to the polls on 8 October starting at 09:00 and expecting to end at 20:00. The elections were peaceful, though voting irregularities prevented some voters from voting. Lines to polling stations were long on some islands, with waits sometimes exceeding six hours. A number of citizens, especially of the opposition Maldivian Democratic Party (MDP), were found to be not on the voter lists, even though they had registered, and some islands did not even receive voter lists. Later, the election committee said that anyone could vote, as long as he or she showed an ID card that was valid. A handful of riot police were deployed after 300 protesters gathered around the central vote-counting location, Nasandhura Palace.

Ahmed Shaheed, the independent vice-presidential nominee said, "It's a disaster... I think there is deliberate tampering." MDP chairwoman Mariya Ahmed Didi, who incidentally registered but was not on a voter list, echoed similar concerns: "We hoped that once in our lifetime we could vote freely, but today we are being denied our right to vote."

Election observers from the Commonwealth of Nations issued an interim report stating that the first round of the election was "reasonably credible" but that there were some problems with the voter list and training of officials and educating voters.

=== Second round ===
In the second round, 209,294 people were eligible to vote. There was a total of 403 polling stations across the Maldives. Registered voters were also able to cast ballots at Maldivian embassies and diplomatic missions in India, Malaysia, Singapore, Sri Lanka, and the United Kingdom.

Voting progressed fairly peacefully although there were some problems, such as people not being registered which prevented them from voting.

== Results ==
=== First round ===
Six candidates competed in the first multi party election ever held in the Maldives. Early results indicated that there would be a runoff between Maumoon Abdul Gayoom and Mohamed Nasheed and his running mate, Dr. Waheed; on the morning of 9 October the results showed Gayoom ahead with 40.3% against Nasheed and Dr. Waheed's 24.9%. Those results stayed the same, and the four other candidates were eliminated, so a runoff between Gayoom and Nasheed was necessary. Although Gayoom failed to win in the first round, as he had hoped, he expressed satisfaction with his score. According to Gayoom, the results showed that he was the Maldives' "most popular public figure", and he said that he was poised for victory in the second round.

=== Second round ===
Following the first round results, it was announced that the second round would be held on 29 October, although election law provided for the second round to be held within 10 days of the first. Election Commissioner Mohamed Ibrahim said that this later date would give the candidates more time to campaign and would give the electoral commission more time "to correct issues with the voter registry".

Third-place finisher Hassan Saeed, a former attorney-general, threw his support to Nasheed and Dr. Waheed for the second round. Ibrahim Ismail also backed Nasheed and Dr. Waheed, and the other two candidates were expected to vouch for Nasheed as well.

=== Results by Atoll ===
Results by atoll and Malé City (2008 presidential election, second round)
| Atoll / area | Mohamed Nasheed (MDP) | | Maumoon Abdul Gayoom (DRP) | | Total valid votes |
| Atoll / area | Votes | % | Votes | % | Total valid votes |
|---|---|---|---|---|---|
| HA | 5,586 | 55.13% | 4,546 | 44.87% | 10,132 |
| HDh | 5,594 | 51.83% | 5,200 | 48.17% | 10,794 |
| Sh | 3,571 | 45.91% | 4,207 | 54.09% | 7,778 |
| N | 3,876 | 51.54% | 3,645 | 48.46% | 7,521 |
| R | 4,271 | 43.90% | 5,459 | 56.10% | 9,730 |
| B | 3,940 | 53.63% | 3,406 | 46.37% | 7,346 |
| Lh | 3,345 | 47.51% | 3,696 | 52.49% | 7,041 |
| K | 6,068 | 51.48% | 5,719 | 48.52% | 11,787 |
| AA | 2,472 | 58.83% | 1,730 | 41.17% | 4,202 |
| ADh | 4,252 | 67.20% | 2,075 | 32.80% | 6,327 |
| V | 569 | 42.09% | 783 | 57.91% | 1,352 |
| M | 1,371 | 36.78% | 2,357 | 63.22% | 3,728 |
| F | 1,267 | 47.21% | 1,417 | 52.79% | 2,684 |
| Dh | 2,030 | 51.13% | 1,940 | 48.87% | 3,970 |
| Th | 3,849 | 51.99% | 3,555 | 48.01% | 7,404 |
| L | 3,481 | 43.20% | 4,576 | 56.80% | 8,057 |
| GA | 3,479 | 53.02% | 3,083 | 46.98% | 6,562 |
| GDh | 5,094 | 55.05% | 4,160 | 44.95% | 9,254 |
| Gn | 2,917 | 53.70% | 2,515 | 46.30% | 5,432 |
| S | 9,913 | 65.98% | 5,112 | 34.02% | 15,025 |
| Malé City | 17,789 | 60.43% | 11,647 | 39.57% | 29,436 |
| Overseas | 2,488 | 65.80% | 1,293 | 34.20% | 3,781 |
| Total shown | 97,222 | 54.21% | 82,121 | 45.79% | 179,343 |

| Candidate | Running mate | Party | First round | | Second round | |
| Candidate | Running mate | Party | Votes | % | Votes | % |
|---|---|---|---|---|---|---|
| Maumoon Abdul Gayoom | Ahmed Thasmeen Ali | Maldivian People's Party | 71,731 | 40.63 | 82,121 | 45.79 |
| Mohamed Nasheed | Mohamed Waheed Hassan | Maldivian Democratic Party | 44,293 | 25.09 | 97,222 | 54.21 |
| Hassan Saeed | Ahmed Shaheed | Independent | 29,633 | 16.78 | | |
| Qasim Ibrahim | Ahmed Ali Sawaad | Jumhooree Party | 27,056 | 15.32 | | |
| Umar Naseer | Ahmed Rizwy | Islamic Democratic Party | 2,472 | 1.40 | | |
| Ibrahim Ismail | Fathimath Nahid Shakir | Social Liberal Party | 1,382 | 0.78 | | |
| Total | | | 176,567 | 100.00 | 179,343 | 100.00 |
| Valid votes | | | 176,567 | 99.31 | 179,343 | 98.97 |
| Invalid/blank votes | | | 1,235 | 0.69 | 1,861 | 1.03 |
| Total votes | | | 177,802 | 100.00 | 181,204 | 100.00 |
| Registered voters/turnout | | | 208,252 | 85.38 | 209,294 | 86.58 |
Source: Election Commission

== See also ==
- List of Maldivian presidential candidates
