= Adhaalath Party =

Political party in the Maldives

Adhaalath Party ޢަދާލަތު ޕާޓީ
- Abbreviation: AP
- President: Mohamed Shifan
- Vice President: Abdullah Rasheed
- Founded: 18 August 2005
- Headquarters: Kalaafaanu Hingun, Malé, 20063
- Membership (June 2026): 7,151
- Ideology: Islamism; Islamic democracy Religious conservatism
- Political position: Right-wing
- Religion: Sunni Islam
- Colours: Green
- People's Majlis: 0 / 93

Website
- adhaalath.org.mv

The Adhaalath Party (Dhivehi: ޢަދާލަތު ޕާޓީ; lit. 'Justice Party', AP) is a political party in the Maldives.

== History ==
The AP was registered as a political party in August 2005, when political parties were allowed to operate for the first time following widespread protests for democracy. Adhaalath has been active in the political arena and has been instrumental in all the recent government changes. Along with Jumhooree Party, Adhaalath has played a pivotal role in the elections, the balance of power shifting to the side to which Adhaalath Party supported during the second round of both the recent presidential elections. The party's first president was Sheikh Hussain Rasheed Ahmed.

After the tenure of Sheikh Hussain Rasheed Ahmed, Sheikh Imran Abdullah became the second president of Adhaalath Party. Dr. Mauroof Hussain, a noted E.N.T specialist trained in India has been the vice president of the party since the beginning. Since May 2015, after the Adhaalath Party together with the main opposition Maldivian Democratic Party organised a rally calling for ending government corruption and judicial reform, the current president of the party Sheikh Imran Abdullah has been incarcerated without trial by the government of president Abdulla Yameen Abdul Gayyoom after Abdullah gave a speech in support of former president Mohamed Nasheed.

On 16 February 2016, Sheikh Imran was sentenced to 12 years in prison, convicted on a terrorism charge for the speech he gave at the opposition protest held on 1 May 2015, which the government said to have created fear and mistrust among the locals, leading to multiple injuries to police officers, locals and their properties. Following the 2018 presidential election, the Adhaalath Party became a member of the ruling coalition government with its President Sheikh Imran serving as the Home Minister for President Ibrahim Mohamed Solih's cabinet.

== Election results ==
=== People's Majlis elections ===
Year	Party Leader	Votes	Vote %	Position	Seats	+/–
2009	Hussain Rasheed Ahmed	1,487	0.90	▲6th	0 / 77	New
2014	Imran Abdulla	4,941	2.66	▲5th	1 / 85	▲1
2019	Imran Abdulla	4,423	2.10	▼6th	0 / 87	▼1
2024	Imran Abdulla	2,538	1.21	6th	0 / 93	0

== See also ==
- List of Islamic political parties
