= 2024 Maldivian parliamentary election =

General election in the Maldives

- 21 April 2024
- All 93 seats in the People's Majlis; 47 seats needed for a majority
- Turnout: 76.27% (▼5.05pp)
Party	Leader	Vote %	Seats	+/–
PNC	Mohamed Muizzu	47.48	66	+63
MDP	Abdulla Shahid	30.74	12	−53
MDA	Ahmed Siyam Mohamed	1.91	2	0
JP	Qasim Ibrahim	1.47	1	−4
MNP	Mohamed Nazim	0.50	1	New
Independents	–	14.52	11	+4
This lists parties that won seats. See the complete results below.
Results by constituency
Speaker before	Speaker after
Mohamed Aslam; MDP	Abdul Raheem Abdulla; PNC

Parliamentary elections were held in the Maldives on 21 April 2024, having previously been scheduled for 17 March. The election date was changed to April after President Mohamed Muizzu ratified election postponement bill by the People's Majlis passed on 28 February. Due to Grade 7, 8 and 9 exams scheduled for 16–27 April clashing with the parliamentary election date, the Ministry of Education decided to bring forward the tests to 27 March–25 April.

The result was a landslide victory for Muizzu's People's National Congress (PNC) and a heavy defeat for the Maldivian Democratic Party (MDP), which won a similar landslide in the 2019 elections. The results were seen as an endorsement of Muizzu's plan to press ahead with closer economic cooperation with China and a rebuke of the pro-India MDP, which had sought to disrupt efforts to realign Maldivian diplomacy.

== Background ==
The election was held amid a dispute between President Mohamed Muizzu and the outgoing People's Majlis, which blocked several of his initiatives as well as the appointment of three of his nominated cabinet members.

== Electoral system ==
The 93 seats in the People's Majlis were elected in single-member constituencies using the first-past-the-post system. Prior to the elections, the number of seats was increased from 87 to 93, with six new seats created.

=== Constituencies ===
Seats in the People's Majlis are split in conformity of Article 10 of the Electoral Constituencies Act which emphasizes stabilization of equal balance amid representation of parliamentary seats. The Act stipulates that two representatives must be appointed for a populace of 5000 or fewer in an administrative division with an additional seat allocated to account for a population surge of another 5000 constituents.

Consequent to the observation of population increases across several regions within the last five years, the number of constituencies was increased to 93 with six new constituencies added to the earlier 87 seats in the 19th parliamentary term.

List of constituencies
SL No.	Code	Constituency	Voters
1	A01	Hoarafushi Constituency	3,540
2	A02	Ihavandhoo Constituency	3,457
3	A03	Baarashu Constituency	3,483
4	A04	Dhidhoo Constituency	3,078
5	A05	Kelaa Constituency	3,188
6	B01	Hanimaadhoo Constituency	3,128
7	B02	Nolhivaram Constituency	3,316
8	B03	Vaikaradhoo Constituency	2,813
9	B04	Kulhudhuffushi Uthuru Constituency	3,559
10	B05	Kulhudhuffushi Dhekunu Constituency	3,514
11	B06	Makunudhoo Constituency	3,457
12	C01	Kanditheemu Constituency	3,510
13	C02	Milandhoo Constituency	3,085
14	C03	Komandoo Constituency	3,412
15	C04	Funadhoo Constituency	3,400
16	D01	Kendhikulhudhoo Constituency	3,267
17	D02	Manadhoo Constituency	3,139
18	D03	Velidhoo Constituency	3,030
19	D04	Holhudhoo Constituency	3,063
20	E01	Alifushi Constituency	3,635
21	E02	Ungoofaaru Constituency	3,313
22	E03	Dhuvaafaru Constituency	3,479
23	E04	Inguraidhoo Constituency	3,574
24	E05	Maduvvari Constituency	3,368
25	F01	Thulhaadhoo Constituency	3,426
26	F02	Eydhafushi Constituency	2,527
27	F03	Kendhoo Constituency	2,591
28	F04	Hithaadhoo Constituency	2,401
29	G01	Hinnavaru Constituency	3,808
30	G02	Naifaru Constituency	4,094
31	G03	Kurendhoo Constituency	2,089
32	H01	Kaashidhoo Constituency	2,853
33	H02	Thulusdhoo Constituency	2,074
34	H03	Maafushi Constituency	2,825
35	H04	Huraa Constituency	2,345
36	I01	Maamigili Constituency	2,878
37	I02	Mahibadhoo Constituency	2,685
38	I03	Dhangethi Constituency	2,538
39	J01	Felidhoo Constituency	1,039
40	J02	Keyodhoo Constituency	915
41	K01	Dhiggaru Constituency	2,698
42	K02	Mulaku Constituency	2,795
43	L01	Bileydhoo Constituency	2,459
44	L02	Nilandhoo Constituency	1,950
45	M01	Meedhoo Constituency	2,697
46	M02	Kudahuvadhoo Constituency	3,155
47	N01	Vilufushi Constituency	2,905
48	N02	Thimarafushi Constituency	2,874
49	N03	Kinbidhoo Constituency	3,268
50	N04	Guraidhoo Constituency	2,707
51	O01	Isdhoo Constituency	3,305
52	O02	Gamu Constituency	3,869
53	O03	Fonadhoo Constituency	3,064
54	O04	Maavashu Constituency	3,038
55	P01	Vilingili Constituency	2,742
56	P02	Dhaandhoo Constituency	2,623
57	P03	Gemanafushi Constituency	2,967
58	P04	Kolamaafushi Constituency	2,358
59	Q01	Thinadhoo Uthuru Constituency	2,954
60	Q02	Thinadhoo Dhekunu Constituency	2,679
61	Q03	Madaveli Constituency	3,141
62	Q04	Faresmaathodaa Constituency	3,494
63	Q05	Gadhdhoo Constituency	3,455
64	R01	Fuvahmulaku Uthuru Constituency	3,648
65	R02	Fuvahmulaku Medhu Constituency	3,070
66	R03	Fuvahmulaku Dhekunu Constituency	2,843
67	S01	Hulhudhoo Constituency	2,843
68	S02	Feydhoo Dhekunu Constituency	2,706
69	S03	Maradhoo Constituency	2,754
70	S04	Hithadhoo Uthuru Constituency	4,028
71	S05	Hithadhoo Medhu Constituency	4,280
72	S06	Hithadhoo Dhekunu Constituency	4,071
73	S07	Addu Meedhoo Constituency	2,287
74	S08	Feydhoo Uthuru Constituency	2,989
75	T01	Hulhumaale Dhekunu Constituency	3,193
76	T02	Medhu henveyru Constituency	3,010
77	T03	Henveyru Dhekunu Constituency	2,675
78	T04	Henveyru Uthuru Constituency	2,402
79	T05	Galolhu Uthuru Constituency	3,914
80	T06	Galolhu Dhekunu Constituency	4,033
81	T07	Machangoalhi Uthuru Constituency	2,842
82	T08	Mahchangoalhee Dhekunu Constituency	2,691
83	T09	Maafannu Uthuru Constituency	3,878
84	T10	Maafannu Hulhangu Constituency	3,555
85	T11	Maafannu Medhu Constituency	3,697
86	T12	Maafannu Dhekunu Constituency	2,884
87	T13	Vilimalé Constituency	3,227
88	T14	Henveyru Hulhangu Constituency	2,806
89	T15	Mahchangoalhi Medhu Constituency	2,820
90	T16	Hulhumalé Medhu Constituency	4,230
91	T17	Hulhumalé Uthuru Constituency	3,220
92	U01	Mathiveri Constituency	2,950
93	U02	Thoddoo Constituency	3,024
Total			284,663

== Campaign ==
The 93 seats were contested by a total of 368 candidates.

== Conduct ==
The Parliamentary Elections Regulations include a comprehensive code of conduct aimed at regulating the behavior of candidates and their supporters during the campaign period. However, concerns were raised over restrictions imposed by the code on freedom of expression and campaigning.

Despite these concerns, the campaign leading up to the parliamentary elections was relatively peaceful. The Maldives Police Service indicated that they did not anticipate any major disruptions, disturbances, or protests either during the campaign period or on Election Day. However, there were potential risks of some disturbances, particularly due to the alleged links of several candidates to gangs.

One key concern was the possibility of disagreements or clashes between supporters of rival candidates, especially in light of incidents during the People's National Congress (PNC) and Maldivian Democratic Party primaries. The Maldives Police Service said they were prepared to handle any such scenarios that may arise.

=== People's National Congress ===
For this election, the PNC entered into a coalition agreement with the Progressive Party of Maldives (PPM), but solely fielded candidates from the PNC, contesting to secure all but three seats this term. The constituencies they had relinquished offered leeway for political leaders of Jumhooree Party (Qasim Ibrahim vying for the Maamigili seat), Maldives Development Alliance (MDA)'s Ahmed Siyam running for the Meedhoo Constituency and Maldives National Party (MNP)'s Mohamed Nazim contesting for the North Maafannu seat, with Special Advisor to the President, Abdul Raheem Abdulla affirming that these seats were forfeited in a bid to display respect to these leaders.

== Candidates ==
The People's National Congress had 90 candidates, followed by the Maldivian Democratic Party with 89 candidates. There were 130 independent candidates among 93 constituencies and four candidates from the Adhaalath Party and the Jumhooree Party. Two candidates contested from the Maldives National Party.

Party	Number of Candidates
Independents	130
People's National Congress	90
Maldivian Democratic Party	89
The Democrats	39
Jumhooree Party	10
Adhaalath Party	4
Maldives Development Alliance	4
Maldives National Party	2
Total	368
Source: The Edition

== Results ==
Allegations of vote buying and undue influence were made on election day. Initial results suggested that the president's party, the People's National Congress was on course to win at least 70 seats. Maldivian media described the results as giving a supermajority for the PNC, with its numbers allowing it to achieve the two-thirds in the People's Majlis that is required to amend the constitution. The PNC's successes came at the cost of the MDP, which itself held a supermajority in the outgoing Majlis and lost its strongholds of Malé, Addu City and Kulhudhuffushi to the PNC.

Party	Votes	%	Seats	+/–
People's National Congress	101,128	47.48	66	+63
Maldivian Democratic Party	65,476	30.74	12	–53
The Democrats	4,634	2.18	0	New
Maldives Development Alliance	4,071	1.91	2	0
Jumhooree Party	3,141	1.47	1	–4
Adhaalath Party	2,538	1.19	0	0
Maldives National Party	1,060	0.50	1	New
Independents	30,931	14.52	11	+4
Total	212,979	100.00	93	+6
Valid votes	212,979	98.10		
Invalid/blank votes	4,120	1.90		
Total votes	217,099	100.00		
Registered voters/turnout	284,663	76.27		
Source: ECM, ORF

== Aftermath ==
MDP chair Fayyaz Ismail congratulated the PNC for winning the election but vowed that it would continue to "hold it accountable as responsible opposition". Several independent candidates who won in the election later joined the PNC, pushing its total number of seats to 73.

== Reactions ==
The United States Department of State said it was "glad to hear observers reported no major issues or irregularities, and that the results are indicative of the will of the people".
