= Maldives Independent =

Maldivian news outlet

- Logo used since 2025
- Type: Daily newspaper
- Managing editor: Ahmed Naish
- Founded: 29 November 2004; 21 years ago
- Website: maldivesindependent.com

Maldives Independent is a news outlet which is based in Maldives. It was conceived in 2004 as Minivan News but was renamed to Maldives Independent in 2015.

== History ==
The outlet was first named Minivan News ('Minivan' meaning Independent) founded by members of the Maldivian Democratic Party (MDP) on 29 November 2004.

In 2014, the office of Minivan News was attacked following the disappearance of former journalist Ahmed Rilwan, which was condemned by the International Federation of Journalists (IFJ) along with Maldives Journalists Association (MJA).

On 31 July 2015, Minivan News was renamed to the Maldives Independent.

In 2016, Police entered the headquarters of the Maldives Independent. This was suspected to be related to the Stealing Paradise documentary by Al Jazeera.

In 2017, Maldives Independent was nominated for the Freedom of Expression Awards 2017 by the Index on Censorship, which they won.

In 2020, Maldives Independent suspended operations due to financial constrains and went on a five-year hiatus; it was re-launched in 2025.
