= Mohamed Aslam (member of parliament) =

20th Speaker of the People's Majlis from 2023 to 2024

- މުޙައްމަދު އަސްލަމް
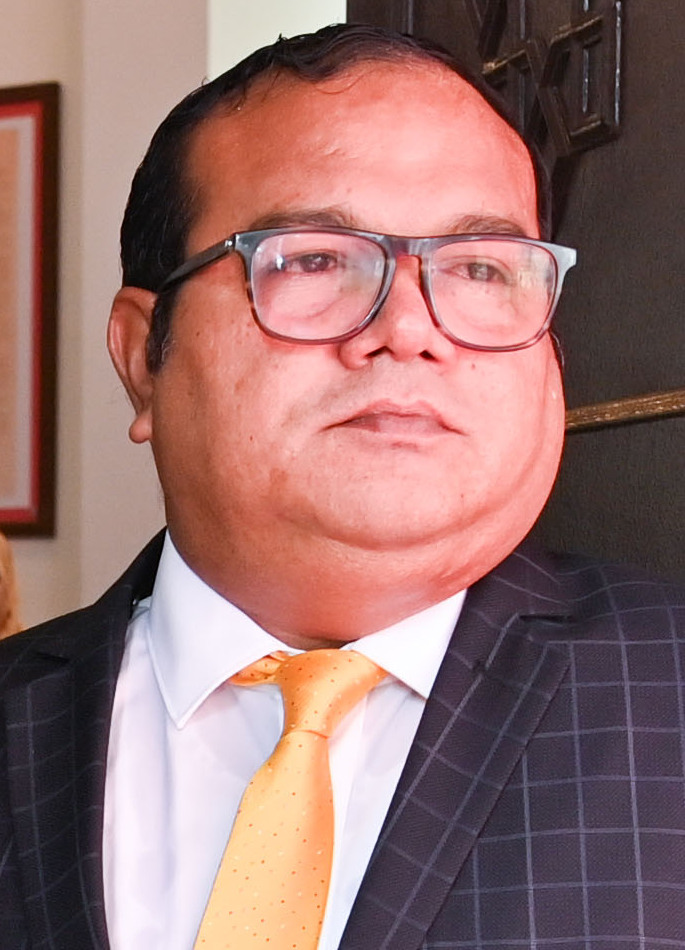
- Aslam in 2023

20th Speaker of the People's Majlis
- In office 13 November 2023 – 28 May 2024
- President: Ibrahim Mohamed Solih; Mohamed Muizzu
- Preceded by: Mohamed Nasheed
- Succeeded by: Abdul Raheem Abdulla

Member of the People's Majlis
- In office 28 May 2019 – 28 May 2024
- Preceded by: Himself
- Succeeded by: Mohamed Sinan
- Constituency: North Hithadhoo

Personal details
- Born: 30 September 1970 (age 55)
- Party: Maldivian Democratic Party

Mohamed Aslam (Dhivehi: މުޙައްމަދު އަސްލަމް; born 30 September 1970) is a Maldivian politician and the 20th speaker of the People's Majlis from 13 November 2023 to 28 May 2024 has served as a member of parliament since 2005. He is a member of the Maldivian Democratic Party (MDP).

Aslam was born on 30 September 1970. Aslam was the running mate of Ibrahim Mohamed Solih in the 2023 Maldivian presidential election. Aslam defeated as MDP's candidate for vice president to PPM's Hussain Mohamed Latheef.
