= 2014 Maldivian parliamentary election =

- 22 March 2014
- All 85 seats in the People's Majlis; 43 seats needed for a majority
- Turnout: 77.92%
Party	Leader	Vote %	Seats	+/–
MDP	Mohamed Nasheed	40.79	26	0
PPM	Maumoon Abdul Gayoom	27.72	33	New
JP	Qasim Ibrahim	13.56	15	+14
MDA	Ahmed Siyam Mohamed	4.04	5	New
AP	Sheikh Imran Abdulla	2.66	1	+1
Independents	–	10.93	5	−8
This lists parties that won seats. See the complete results below.
Results by constituency
Speaker before	Speaker after
Abdulla Shahid; MDP	Abdulla Maseeh Mohamed; PPM

Parliamentary elections were held in the Maldives on 22 March 2014. The Progressive Party of Maldives and its allies won 53 seats.

== Background ==
The elections were held after the controversial presidential elections in which Abdulla Yameen defeated Mohamed Nasheed of the Maldivian Democratic Party. Following the elections the Supreme Court dismissed the Chairman and Deputy Chairman of the Election Commission for contempt of court. The MDP protested, but did not boycott the parliamentary elections.

One the day before the elections Qasim Ibrahim of the Jumhooree Party requested that the Supreme Court to delay the elections due to the Election Commission not having a full complement of members. However, his request was rejected.

== Electoral system ==
The 85 seats in the People's Majlis were elected in single-member constituencies using the first-past-the-post system. The Majlis was expanded from 77 to 85 seats.

== Results ==
Party	Votes	%	Seats	+/–
Maldivian Democratic Party	75,670	40.79	26	0
Progressive Party of Maldives	51,424	27.72	33	New
Jumhooree Party	25,149	13.56	15	+14
Maldives Development Alliance	7,496	4.04	5	New
Adhaalath Party	4,941	2.66	1	+1
Dhivehi Rayyithunge Party	549	0.30	0	–28
Independents	20,276	10.93	5	–8
Total	185,505	100.00	85	+8
Valid votes	185,505	98.93		
Invalid/blank votes	2,011	1.07		
Total votes	187,516	100.00		
Registered voters/turnout	240,652	77.92		
Source: IFES
