= Ibrahim Mohamed Solih =

President of the Maldives from 2018 to 2023

- އިބްރާހީމް މުޙައްމަދް ޞޯލިޙް
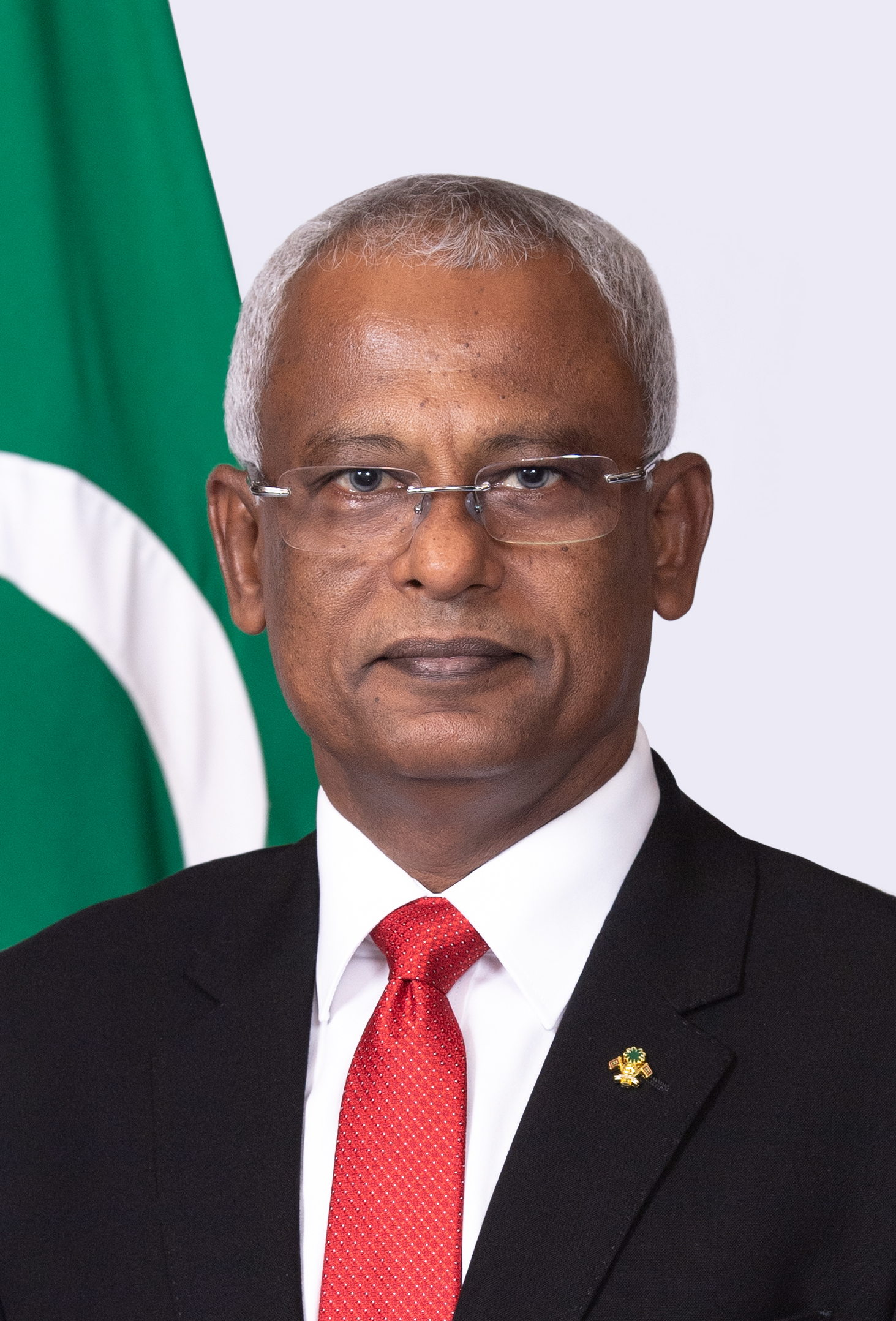
- Official portrait, 2019.

7th President of the Maldives
- In office 17 November 2018 – 17 November 2023
- Vice President: Faisal Naseem
- Preceded by: Abdulla Yameen
- Succeeded by: Mohamed Muizzu

Member of the People's Majlis
- In office 28 May 2009 – 16 November 2018
- Preceded by: Constituency created
- Succeeded by: Jeehan Mahmood
- Constituency: Hinnavaru
- In office 27 February 1995 – 27 May 2009
- Succeeded by: Constituency abolished
- Constituency: Lhaviyani Atoll

President of the Maldivian Democratic Party
- Acting
- In office 24 November 2023 – 20 February 2024
- Preceded by: Mohamed Nasheed
- Succeeded by: Abdulla Shahid

Personal details
- Born: 1 March 1962 (age 64) Hinnavaru, Sultanate of the Maldive Islands
- Party: Maldivian Democratic Party (2003–present)
- Spouse: Fazna Ahmed (m. 1992)
- Children: 2 - 1 daughter, 1 son

Ibrahim Mohamed Solih (Dhivehi: އިބްރާހީމް މުޙައްމަދް ޞޯލިޙް; born 4 May 1962), popularly known as Ibu, is a Maldivian politician who served as the 7th President of the Maldives from 2018 to 2023. Solih was a parliamentarian for 15 years, he represented the Hinnavaru constituency and the Lhaviyani Atoll constituency during his tenure. He played a significant role in the democratic reforms of the Maldives and led the Maldivian Democratic Party (MDP) to victory in the 2018 presidential election. Solih was elected president on 23 September 2018 after winning the 2018 presidential election as the candidate for the Maldivian Democratic Party (MDP). His presidency focused on democratic governance, environmental sustainability, and strengthening international relations.

== Early and personal life ==
Ibrahim Mohamed Solih was born on 1 March 1962 in Hinnavaru, Maldives. At a young age, he moved to Malé for his education and has been a resident there ever since. He is one of 13 children in his family. Solih completed his secondary education at Majeediyya School in Malé. During his school years, he was a popular student who actively participated in various school activities, particularly in sports.

He is married to Fazna Ahmed and they have a daughter named Sarah and a son named Yaman.

Solih has been associated with former president Mohamed Nasheed, who is also the first cousin of Solih's wife Fazna. Solih and Nasheed played an instrumental role in establishing multiparty democracy in the Maldives. After three years into his presidency, the relations between Solih and Nasheed collapsed due to ideological disputes within their party. Ibrahim Mohamed Solih has been a senior figure in the party and lead the first parliamentary group of the Maldivian Democratic Party (MDP) in 2009 until he was elected as the president of Maldives in 2018.

== Political career ==
Solih has been the parliamentary group leader of the Maldivian Democratic Party (MDP) since 2011. He has served as the leader of the joint parliamentary group since the opposition coalition was formed in March 2017.

Solih was selected as the new presidential candidate for the coalition of opposition parties in the 2018 election, when former president Mohamed Nasheed, due to his prior conviction, was not able to contest as a candidate for presidential election.

Solih went on to claim a landslide victory over Yameen, winning the election with 58.4% of the vote and receiving nearly 38,500 votes more than his opponent. In the run-up to the election, many foreign observers had asserted that the election could be rigged in Yameen's favor and that he was thus likely to win a second term. However, when the counting of ballots was nearing completion on election night, President Yameen addressed the nation and conceded the election to Solih, this being a few hours after the latter had claimed victory and urged the president for a peaceful transition of power.

The main issue of the campaign has widely been recognized as the question of whether the Maldives should continue to pursue closer relations with China, as it had under Yameen’s administration, or whether it should instead turn to India and countries of the Western world (especially the United States), which is a direction more favoured by the MDP-led opposition coalition.

=== Presidency ===
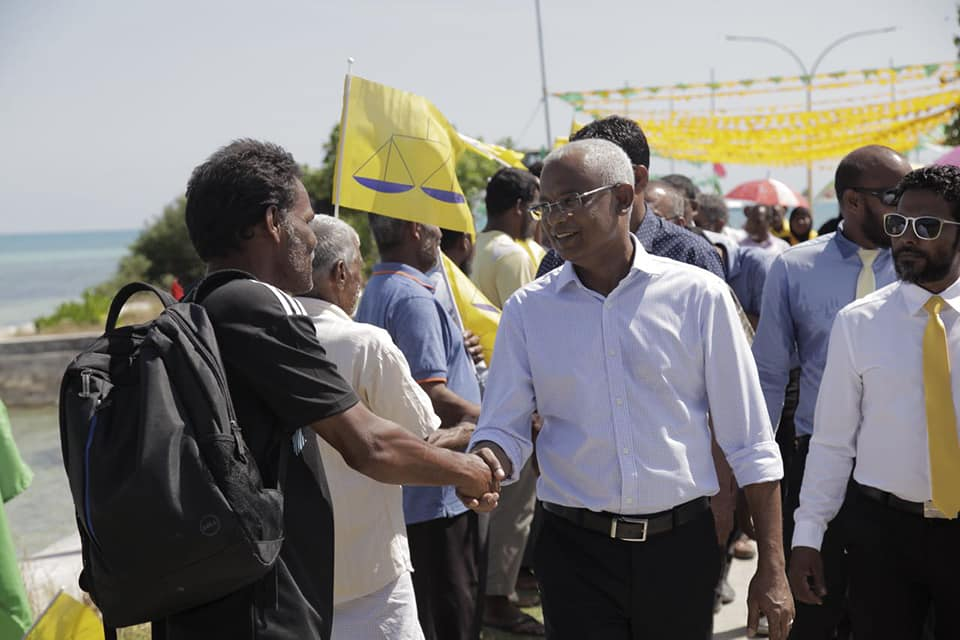
Solih on the campaign trail as the opposition's presidential candidate in 2018

Solih assumed office on 17 November 2018, following the end of Abdulla Yameen's 5-year term. Solih became the 7th president of the Maldives, and the country's third democratically elected president, following Mohamed Nasheed and Abdulla Yameen, since Nasheed unseated Maumoon Abdul Gayoom in the 2008 election, ending the latter's 30-year long, six-term incumbency. Solih is the first Maldivian president to be born outside the capital of Malé, as well as the second-oldest person to assume the presidency, at the age of 54, with only Mohamed Waheed Hassan Manik being older when taking office.

On 19 November 2019, Solih announced that the Maldives would rejoin the Commonwealth of Nations, a decision recommended by his cabinet, considering that the Maldives was a republic in the Commonwealth of Nations from 1982 to 2016. Solih became a Commonwealth head of government and a Commonwealth head of state when the Maldives returned to the Commonwealth on 1 February 2020.

His government also sought to pursue closer relations with India. This was contrary to former president, Abdulla Yameen who pursued closer relations with China, implicating India. Solih reaffirmed the country's previous "India-First Policy" stance in regards to the country's foreign affairs.

In the April 2019 Maldivian parliamentary election, the Maldivian Democratic Party (MDP) won in a landslide victory, winning 65 of 87 seats in the parliament. This was the first time a single party was able to get a supermajority in Maldivian history.

In 2021, his government exceeded the target amount of tourists for that year and achieved 1.3 million tourists.

In 2022, he started the Greater Malé Connectivity Project which links Malé, Villingili, Gulhifalhu, and Thilafushi.

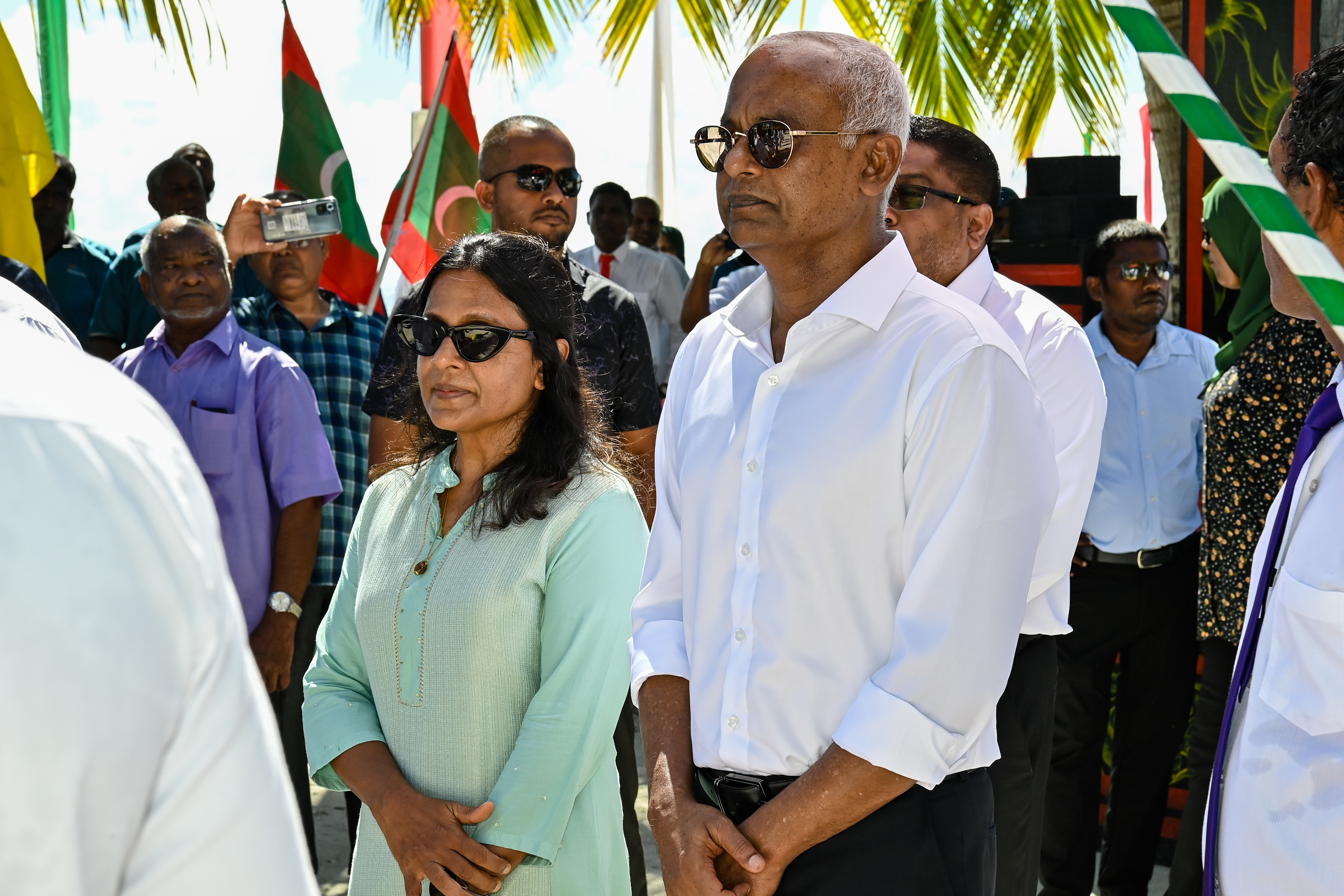
Mohamed Solih with Fazna Ahmed during a visit to F.Nilandhoo, May 2023.

In 2023, he completed a vast amount of infrastructure projects in different islands of the Maldives including L. Hithadhoo, D. Hulhudheli, and more. His government also resolved the 58-year-old boundary dispute between the Maldives and Mauritius at the International Tribunal for the Law of the Sea (ITLOS) where they ruled in favor of the Maldives thus being given the bigger half.

During the 2023 Maldivian presidential election, Solih was seeking re-election with a new running mate, Mohamed Aslam. During which he lost to the opposition backed PNC-PPM's Mohamed Muizzu.

=== Post-presidency ===
During the 2024 Maldivian parliamentary election, Solih was campaigning for parliament majority for the 20th Parliamentary Session of the People's Majlis. But unfortunately, his party got minority and the People's National Congress (PNC) got majority.

== See also ==
- List of international presidential trips made by Ibrahim Mohamed Solih

Political offices
Preceded by Abdulla Yameen	President of the Maldives; 2018–2023	Succeeded by Mohamed Muizzu
