= Jumhooree Party =

Political party in the Maldives

Republican Party ޖުމްހޫރީ ޕާޓީ
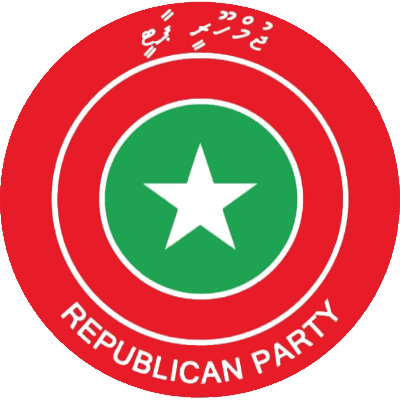
- Abbreviation: JP
- Leader: Qasim Ibrahim
- Founded: 26 May 2008
- Split from: Dhivehi Rayyithunge Party
- Headquarters: Malé, Maldives
- Youth wing: Youth League
- Women's wing: Women's League
- Membership (June 2026): 10,401
- Ideology: Islamic democracy Nationalism; Social conservatism
- Political position: Centre-right to right-wing
- Colors: Red
- People's Majlis: 1 / 93

Website
- jumhooree.org

The Jumhooree Party (Dhivehi: ޖުމްހޫރީ ޕާޓީ, lit. 'Republican Party') is a political party in the Maldives. The party was founded by a group of MPs on 26 May 2008, and grew quickly, rapidly overtaking the Maldivian Democratic Party to become the largest opposition party in the Majlis for that year.

The party's leader and its presidential candidate is businessman and former finance minister Qasim Ibrahim.

== History ==
JP's candidate was also Qasim Ibrahim during the 2008 and 2013 presidential elections.

During the 2009 Maldivian parliamentary election, the JP won only one seat.

During the 2014 Maldivian parliamentary election, the JP contested in 28 constituencies and won only 15 seats.

In 2018, JP didn't run for the 2018 Maldivian presidential election due to Qasim being barred from running because of bribery charges placed on him in 2017.

During the 2019 Maldivian parliamentary election, the JP contested in 41 constituencies, however only winning 15 of them.

In February 2023, five deputy leaders were elected in the JP. They were Aishath Nahula, Ameen Ibrahim, Ali Shah, Iqbal Adam, and Ahmed Saud.

In March 2023, the party's planning of the campaign for the 2023 Maldivian presidential election was handed over to Ameen Ibrahim.

In June 2023, Qasim Ibrahim was appointed as the party's candidate for the 2023 presidential elections. He appointed Ameen Ibrahim as his running mate.

During the 2024 Maldivian parliamentary election, the JP ran for 10 out of the 93 constituencies. Although, the JP only secured one seat.

== Election results ==
=== Presidential elections ===
Election	Party candidate	Running mate	Votes	%	Votes	%	Result
Election	Party candidate	Running mate	First round		Second round		Result
2008	Qasim Ibrahim	Ahmed Ali Sawaad	27,056	15.32%	—N/a		Lost ✗
2013	Qasim Ibrahim	Hassan Saeed	~~50,422~~	~~24.07%~~	—N/a		Annulled ✗
2013	Qasim Ibrahim	Hassan Saeed	48,131	23.34%	—N/a		Lost ✗
2018	Did not participate						
2023	Qasim Ibrahim	Ameen Ibrahim	5,545	2.52%	—N/a		Lost ✗

=== People's Majlis elections ===
Year	Party Leader	Votes	Vote %	Position	Seats	+/–
2009	Qasim Ibrahim	6,882	4.16	▲4th	1 / 77	New
2014	Qasim Ibrahim	25,149	13.56	▲3rd	15 / 85	▲14
2019	Qasim Ibrahim	23,452	11.15	▲2nd	5 / 87	▼10
2024	Qasim Ibrahim	3,141	1.49	▼5th	1 / 93	▼4

== See also ==
- List of Islamic political parties
