= Member of the People's Majlis =

Representative in the People's Majlis

- Logo of the People's Majlis

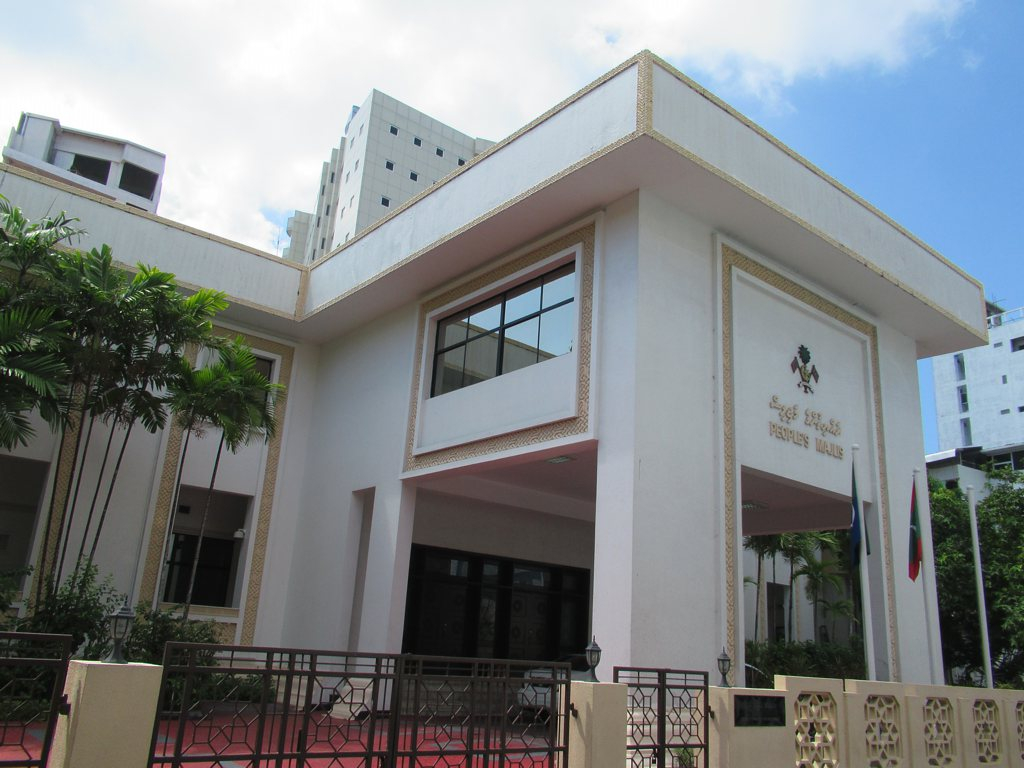
- Incumbent; 20th Majlis since 28 May 2024
- People's Majlis
- Style: Honourable
- Abbreviation: MP
- Member of: People's Majlis
- Term length: 5 years; renewable
- Constituting instrument: Constitution of the Maldives
- Unofficial names: Member of parliament
- Website: majlis.gov.mv

In the Maldives, a Member of the People's Majlis refers to individuals elected to serve in the People's Majlis, the unicameral parliament of the Maldives.

== Electoral system ==
All the members are elected in a first-past-the-post voting system where each constituency has its own single representative.

== Elections ==
The seats of the parliament members become vacant for elections held every five years.

If there is a vacancy before the five years due to a death or resignation, then the constituency vacancy can be filled by a by-election.

== Eligibility ==
A person can be eligible to run for a seat in the Majlis if they are:

- a Maldivian citizen (acquired citizenship five years before election and must be domiciled);
- aren't a citizen of any other country;
- are a Sunni Muslim;
- aged eighteen or above;
- is of sound mind.

They'll be disqualified if they:

- are a member of the judiciary;
- has a decreed debt which isn't being paid as provided in a judgement;
- have been convicted of a criminal offence and serving for more than twelve months;
- have been convicted of a criminal offence and serving for more than twelve months and a period of three years hasn't been elapsed since his release or pardon.

A member of the People's Majlis can't be part of:

- Cabinet of Ministers;
- can't hold the position of State Minister, Deputy Minister, or any other position of those level;
- an independent commission or independent office;
- the civil service;
- the Armed forces;
- the Police;
- a corporation wholly or partly controlled by the government;
- any other office of the State.
