= Maldivian Democratic Party =

Maldivian Democratic Party ދިވެހިރައްޔިތުންގެ ޑިމޮކްރެޓިކް ޕާޓީ
- Abbreviation: MDP
- President: Vacant
- Chairperson: Mohamed Nasheed
- Governing body: Maldivian Democratic Party Congress
- Vice President: Hisaan Hussain
- Parliamentary Leader: Ibrahim Nazil
- Deputy Chairperson: Ibrahim Waheed; Ahmed Abdulla
- Founded: November 10, 2003
- Headquarters: 2nd Floor, Niusha, Lily Magu, Galolhu; Malé, Maldives
- Youth wing: MDP Youth Wing
- Membership (June 2026): 55,399
- Ideology: Liberal conservatism Islamic democracy
- Political position: Centre-right
- International affiliation: International Democracy Union
- Colors: Yellow
- People's Majlis: 13 / 93
- City Mayors: 5 / 5
- City Council Seats: 46 / 52

Website
- mdp.org.mv

The Maldivian Democratic Party (Dhivehi: ދިވެހި ރައްޔިތުންގެ ޑިމޮކްރެޓިކް ޕާޓީ, Dhivehi Rayyithunge Demokretik Paati; MDP) is a centre-right political party in the Maldives. It was the first political party to be formally registered in the Second Republic of the Maldives.

The party played a major role in the advent of democracy in the Maldives and the institution of political reforms that opened up the country. It won the first ever multi-party elections in the Maldives with a coalition of parties in the 2008 elections against the incumbent president Maumoon Abdul Gayoom who was up for re-election.

== History ==
=== Founding ===
There had not been political parties in the Maldives since 1952. The MDP initially submitted its registration on 24 February 2001. In 2001, the party's first president was Qasim Ibrahim. Although the Maldivian Constitution allows political parties to operate, the MDP's application was rebuffed. After the people fighting for their rights on the street and the death of Evan Naseem, MDP declared its existence in exile from Sri Lanka on 10 November 2003. Initially, it was formed by a group of 42 people, which included members of parliament, a former cabinet minister and leading businessmen, including Qasim Ibrahim and Ahmed Easa. Members on its first general council were elected on 13 February 2004. Although the MDP was not recognized by the Maldivian government, it began operating in Maldives on 30 April 2005.

On 2 June 2005, the members of the People's Majlis unanimously voted to legally recognize political parties. The MDP subsequently submitted its registration on 26 June 2005, becoming the first political party to be registered in the Second Republic of Maldives.

Throughout 2006, the opposition faced restrictions on freedom of assembly, and the government continued to arrest opposition activists. In March 2006, the government introduced a "Roadmap for Reform" and subsequently introduced several bills in parliament. In August 2007, voters decided via referendum that the Maldives' new constitution should provide for a presidential system of government (vice parliamentary). The special Majlis completed its work and the new constitution took effect in August 2008.

MDP rally on the streets of Malé during the presidential election campaigns of 2008

In accordance with the new constitution ratified by then-president Gayoom on 7 August 2008, the first round of presidential elections was held on 10 October 2008. Due to no single candidate receiving 50% of the vote, a second round was held on 29 October between President Gayoom and Mohamed Nasheed. Nasheed won with 54% of the vote.

=== Nasheed Presidency (2008–2012) ===
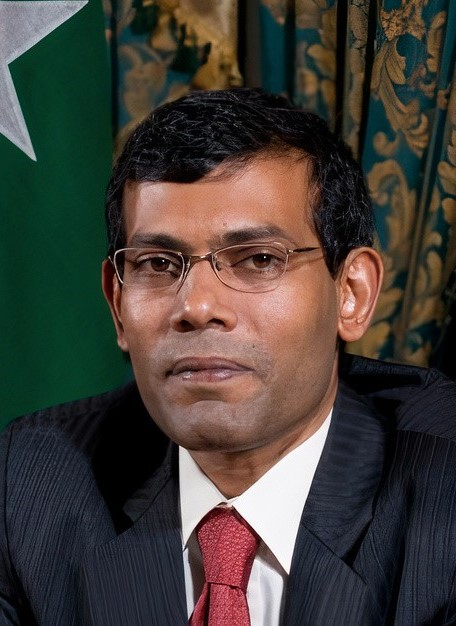
Mohamed Nasheed, the 4th president (2008–2012)

In October 2008, the MDP candidate Mohamed Nasheed defeated the incumbent president Maumoon Abdul Gayoom in the 2008 presidential election in the second round. He was able to form a multi-party coalition against Gayoom.

In the 2009 parliamentary elections, the party was not able to secure an outright majority. It won a plurality of the votes and secured 26 of 77 seats in parliament.

During Mohamed Nasheed's presidency, he advocated for climate action at international forums, established the universal healthcare scheme "Aasandha," and implemented market-oriented reforms, most notably the privatisation of the Male' International Airport. The airport was leased out to Indian conglomerate GMR and Malaysia Airport Holding and was heavily criticised by opposition parties over national security concerns.

Nasheed gained international renown in 2009 for holding an underwater cabinet meeting to highlight the threat of climate change to the country. However, his term was characterised by a gridlocked parliament and numerous political crises brought on by an economic recession, religious groups demanding more conservative policies, and a controversial arrest of a chief judge of the criminal court.

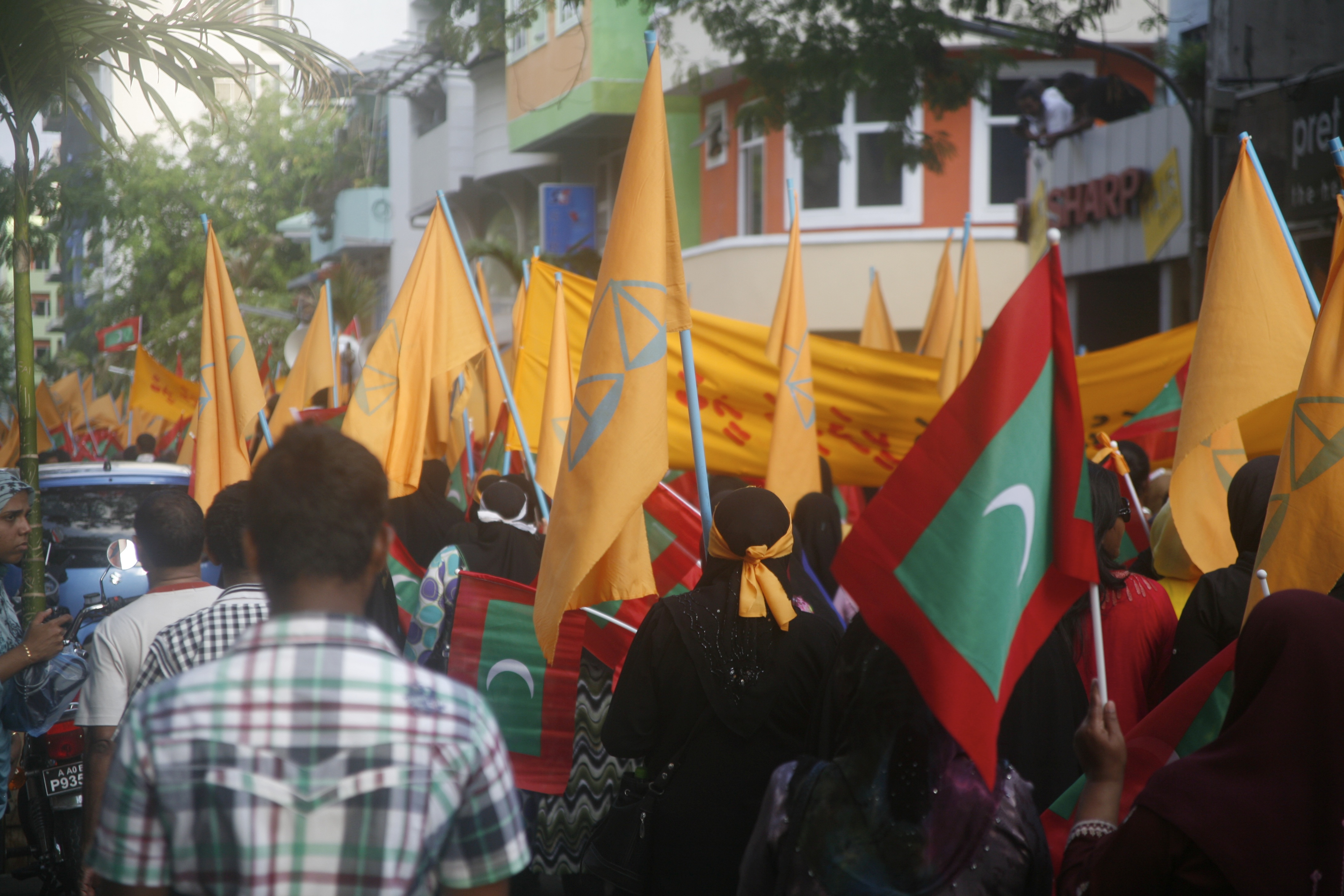
International Women's Day march, in 2012

In the midst of a political crisis in 2012 and weeks of unrest, he resigned in what is claimed to be a coup d’état. Nasheed has said that he was forced to resign at gunpoint by police and army officers.

=== In Opposition (2013–2017) ===
In 2013, the MDP's candidate Mohamed Nasheed narrowly lost to the PPM's candidate Abdulla Yameen in the 2013 presidential elections.

=== Solih Presidency (2018–2023) ===
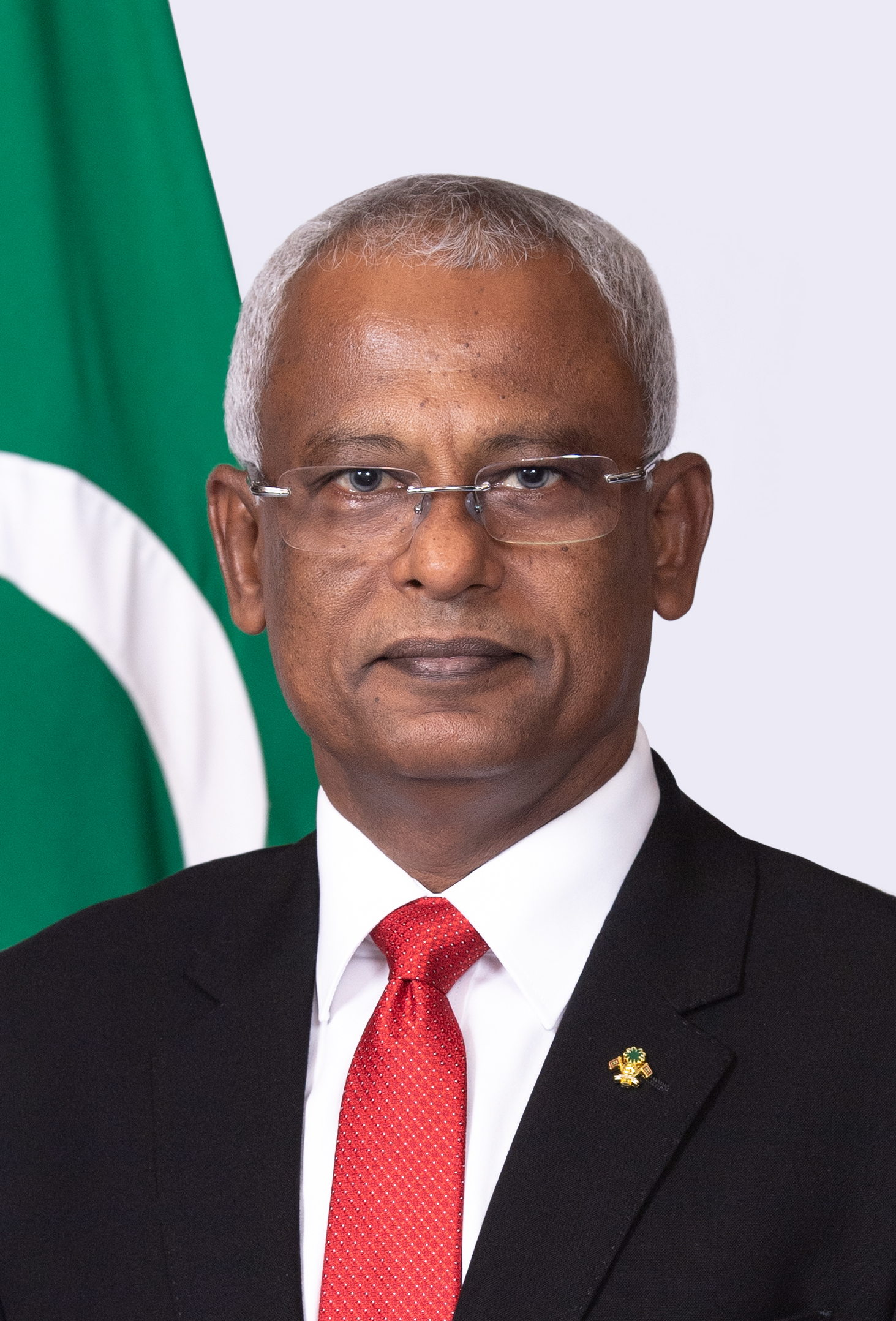
Ibrahim Mohamed Solih, the 7th president (2018–2023)

In the 2018 presidential elections, the MDP's candidate Ibrahim Mohamed Solih defeated incumbent President Abdulla Yameen. He pledged to fight against widespread corruption and investigate the human rights abuses of the Yameen government.

In the April 2019 parliamentary election, the party won a historic landslide victory, and won 65 of 87 seats in parliament.

His government is credited for enacting a national minimum wage, the country's economic recovery from COVID-19 in 2021 and starting multiple infrastructure projects, most notably the Raajje Transport Link, the development of Gulhifalhu and the construction of the Thilamale' Bridge.

Solih's presidency is criticised for his controversial pardon of Ahmed Adeeb (a central figure in the MMPRC scandal), over-reliance on India and failing to deliver accountability in the Rilwan case, a core pledge in his election campaign.

==== 2023 Maldivian Democratic Party presidential primary ====
In June 2022, Mohamed Nasheed announced that he would be challenging the incumbent president Ibrahim Mohamed Solih for the Maldivian Democratic Party's nomination for the 2024 presidential election. A political rift had arisen between the two leaders, which originally began with a disagreement on changing the Maldives' presidential system of governance to a parliamentary system, with Nasheed preferring the latter. Nasheed also accused the President of enacting policies contrary to the founding principles and ideology of the party. A faction of Nasheed's supporters had formed in parliament, with MPs voting against bills sent by the MDP government. He also alleged that the president had removed more than 39,000 of the party's early members from the membership rolls, stating that they were less likely to vote for him and that Solih was attempting to twist the primary election in his favor. Solih won the primary election with 61.10% of the vote.

On 17 May 2023, 12 members of Maldivian Democratic Party resigned from the party the and formed a new party called The Democrats. The twelve members defected from the MDP after the warnings of expulsions of four MDP MPs in their faction from the party as well as the expulsion of Central Henveiru MP Ali Azim (who was also a Nasheed loyalist). The faction on several occasions violated the party's whip line and launched a no-confidence motion against multiple government ministers in Ibrahim Mohamed Solih's cabinet.

On 21 June 2023, the party's leader and the faction's leader Mohamed Nasheed quit after 18 years of being a member of the party and joined the newly created Democrats.

The Democrats had announced that they would contest in the 2023 presidential election in September. But the party came third place with 7% of the vote, making them ineligible to run in the second round.

In the first round of the 2023 elections, Ibrahim Mohamed Solih received 39% of the votes to the PNC/PPM candidate Mohamed Muizzu's 46%. In the second round, held on 30 September 2023, Mohamed Muizzu won the second-round runoff of the Maldives presidential election, beating incumbent president, Ibrahim Mohamed Solih, with 54% of the vote to his 45%. Some attribute this loss to The Democrats and others to dissatisfaction with Ibrahim Mohamed Solih's presidency.

On 29 December 2023, several members of the MDP defected to PNC.

In the 2024 Maldivian parliamentary election, the party was wiped out in an landslide defeat, losing 56 seats and winning just 9.

==== Democrats return to the MDP ====
The Democrats passed a resolution to dissolve the party and all the members to join the Maldivian Democratic Party. This resolution called for reuinification and a stronger opposition.

MDP marked its 20th anniversary on 26 June, during its anniversary the party launched a special podcast by MDP's Youth Wing, cake cutting ceremonies and more events in each island.

MDP had proposed a structural change in its leadership by proposing to merge both its chairperson and president roles into one role, where the officeholder can't contest in MDP's presidential primaries, prohibited from holding any government roles, as well as not being able to serve as a member of parliament.

MDP had received criticism for not investigating the MMPRC scandal during Sollih's time as president and that the party "gave up justice for political expediency".

=== In opposition (2023–present) ===
The party regained momentum in the 2026 local elections. MDP mayors were elected in all five cities and the party secured significant majorities in the city councils. However, factional tensions were reignited after Mohamed Nasheed was not permitted to give a speech at a celebration rally held in Malé. This triggered boycotts of the event from Nasheed and his supporters, which the president of the MDP Abdulla Shahid criticised as stoking division within the party.

MDP's Legal Director Ahmed Mauroof and MDP Deputy Chairperson Ibrahim Waheed was dismissed from their posts with no reason being specified. A petition was underway to take a no-confidence vote against interim chairperson Abdul Ghafoor Moosa. Later, Ibrahim Mohamed Solih announced that the internal disputes have been solved. Nasheed thanked Fayyaz Ismail for his efforts to solve it. Waheed, Mauroof were reinstated and the no confidence petition have been withdrawn.

The MDP National Council announced as part of a reform of the party to form a committee to advise the chairperson. The committee's members include Mohamed Nasheed, Ibrahim Mohamed Solih, Abdulla Shahid, Abdul Ghafoor Moosa, Ibrahim Nazil, Fayyaz Ismail.

== Election results ==
=== Presidential elections ===
Election	Party candidate	Running mate	Votes	%	Votes	%	Result
Election	Party candidate	Running mate	First Round		Second Round		Result
2008	Mohamed Nasheed	Mohamed Waheed Hassan	44,293	24.91%	97,222	53.65%	Elected ✓
2013	Mohamed Nasheed	Mustafa Lutfi	95,224	45.45%	—N/a		Annulled ✗
2013	Mohamed Nasheed	Mustafa Lutfi	96,764	46.93%	105,181	48.61%	Lost ✗
2018	Ibrahim Mohamed Solih	Faisal Naseem	134,616	58.34%	—N/a		Elected ✓
2023	Ibrahim Mohamed Solih	Mohamed Aslam	85,989	39.12%	109,548	45.94%	Lost ✗

=== People's Majlis elections ===
Election	Party Leader	Votes	%	Seats	+/–	Position
2005 (Note: In the 2005 election, candidates ran as independents endorsed by the MDP.)	None	68,931	31.10%	18 / 42	New	▲2nd
2009	Mohamed Nasheed	51,184	30.81%	26 / 77	▲15	2nd
2014	Mohamed Nasheed	75,670	40.78%	26 / 85	0	2nd
2019	Mohamed Nasheed	96,354	45.83%	65 / 87	▲39	▲1st
2024	Abdulla Shahid	64,650	30.73%	12 / 93	▼53	▼2nd

== See also ==
- List of Islamic political parties
