= List of Maldivian presidential candidates =

People who registered as a candidate for president of the Maldives

Sixteen people have run in the presidential elections in the Maldives since the first election in 1952. These elections determine the President of the Maldives, who serves as both head of state and head of government under the Constitution of the Maldives. Presidential elections in the Maldives have taken place in both the First and Second republics.

The first presidential election happened in 1952, during the First Republic of the Maldives. Mohamed Amin Didi along with his running mate, Ibrahim Muhammad Didi, won with 96% of the votes and were elected as president and vice president, respectively. Under the 1968 Constitution, the People's Majlis chose a single presidential nominee from a list of candidates and a national referendum was held. The nominee was either approved or rejected for a five-year term. The second presidential election happened in the same year, where Ibrahim Nasir won with 97%.

The 2008 election served as the first multiparty presidential election under the 2008 Constitution, which introduced a direct popular vote and a two-term limit. It was the second-most contested election, with six people participating from different political parties. Mohamed Nasheed from the Maldivian Democratic Party (MDP) won the election and defeated the incumbent Maumoon Abdul Gayoom. The election held in 2013 was the first and only presidential election to be annulled by the Supreme Court of the Maldives, following reports which claimed that dead people and people under the voting age had voted. Abdulla Yameen of the Progressive Party of Maldives (PPM) defeated Nasheed in the re-run.

The least-contested election under the 2008 constitution was the 2018 election, with two candidates from two parties. Ibrahim Mohamed Solih of the MDP defeated incumbent Yameen of the PPM. President Yameen alleged that the election was rigged due to the use of disappearing ink; this claim was rejected by the Supreme Court. The most-contested election was the 2023 election, with eight people participating from different political parties. None of them reached the 50% needed to win so a second round was held in which the two leading candidates, Mohamed Muizzu of the People's National Congress (PNC) and the incumbent Solih, ran against each other; Muizzu defeated Solih.

== List ==
List of Maldivian presidential candidates
Year	#	Portrait	Candidate	Party	Vice Presidential candidate	Votes	Result	Ref
1952	—	Mohamed Amin Didi, the presidential candidate in the 1952 election, who won.	Mohamed Amin Didi	RMP	Ibrahim Muhammad	Unknown	Won	
1968	—	Ibrahim Nasir, the presidential candidate in both the 1968 and 1973 election, who won both of them.	Ibrahim Nasir	IND	None	Unknown	Won	
1973	—	Ibrahim Nasir, the presidential candidate in both the 1968 and 1973 election, who won both of them.	Ibrahim Nasir	IND	None	Unknown	Won	
1978	—	Maumoon Abdul Gayoom, the presidential candidate in the 1978, 1983, 1988, 1993, 1993, and 2003 elections, who won each of them.	Maumoon Abdul Gayoom	IND	Vacant; No Vice president	Unknown	Won	
1983	—	Maumoon Abdul Gayoom, the presidential candidate in the 1978, 1983, 1988, 1993, 1993, and 2003 elections, who won each of them.	Maumoon Abdul Gayoom	IND	Vacant; No Vice president	57,913	Won	
1988	—	Maumoon Abdul Gayoom, the presidential candidate in the 1978, 1983, 1988, 1993, 1993, and 2003 elections, who won each of them.	Maumoon Abdul Gayoom	IND	Vacant; No Vice president	69,373	Won	
1993	—	Maumoon Abdul Gayoom, the presidential candidate in the 1978, 1983, 1988, 1993, 1993, and 2003 elections, who won each of them.	Maumoon Abdul Gayoom	IND	Vacant; No Vice president	Unknown	Won	
1998	—	Maumoon Abdul Gayoom, the presidential candidate in the 1978, 1983, 1988, 1993, 1993, and 2003 elections, who won each of them.	Maumoon Abdul Gayoom	IND	Vacant; No Vice president	86,504	Won	
2003	—	Maumoon Abdul Gayoom, the presidential candidate in the 1978, 1983, 1988, 1993, 1993, and 2003 elections, who won each of them.	Maumoon Abdul Gayoom	DRP	Vacant; No Vice president	102,909	Won	
2008	1	Qasim Ibrahim, candidate #1 in the 2008 election.	Qasim Ibrahim	JP	Ahmed Ali Sawaad	27,056	Lost	
2008	2	Maumoon Abdul Gayoom, candidate #2 in the 2008 election.	Maumoon Abdul Gayoom	DRP	Ahmed Thasmeen Ali	71,731 (First Round) 82,121 (Second Round)	Lost	
2008	3	Hassan Saeed, candidate #3 in the 2008 election.	Hassan Saeed	IND	Ahmed Shaheed	29,633	Lost	
2008	4	Mohamed Nasheed, candidate #4 in the 2008 election, who won.	Mohamed Nasheed	MDP	Mohamed Waheed Hassan	44,293 (First Round) 97,222 (Second Round)	Won	
2008	5	Ibrahim Ismail, candidate #5 in the 2008 election.	Ibrahim Ismail	SLP	Fathimath Nahid Shakir	1,382	Lost	
2008	6	Umar Naseer, candidate #6 in the 2008 election.	Umar Naseer	IDP	Ahmed Rizwy	2,472	Lost	
2013	1	Qasim Ibrahim, candidate #1 in the 2013 election.	Qasim Ibrahim	JP	Hassan Saeed	48,131	Lost	
2013	2	Mohamed Waheed Hassan, candidate #2 in the 2013 election.	Mohamed Waheed Hassan	IND	Ahmed Thasmeen Ali	10,750 (Note: Votes annulled by the Supreme Court and he later dropped out)	Lost	
2013	3	Abdulla Yameen, candidate #3 in the 2013 election, who won.	Abdulla Yameen	PPM	Mohamed Jameel Ahmed	61,278 (First Round) 111,203 (Second Round)	Won	
2013	4	Mohamed Nasheed, candidate #4 in the 2013 election.	Mohamed Nasheed	MDP	Mustafa Lutfi	96,764 (First Round) 105,181 (Second Round)	Lost	
2018	1	Abdulla Yameen, candidate #1 in the 2018 election.	Abdulla Yameen	PPM	Mohamed Shaheem	96,052	Lost	
2018	2	Ibrahim Mohamed Solih, candidate #2 in the 2018 election, who won.	Ibrahim Mohamed Solih	MDP	Faisal Naseem	134,705	Won	
2023	1	Umar Naseer, candidate #1 in the 2023 election.	Umar Naseer	IND	Ahmed Saleem	6,343	Lost	
2023	2	Hassan Zameel, candidate #2 in the 2023 elections.	Hassan Zameel	IND	Mariyam Aleem	327	Lost	
2023	3	Ibrahim Mohamed Solih, candidate #3 in the 2023 elections.	Ibrahim Mohamed Solih	MDP	Mohamed Aslam	86,161 (First Round) 109,868 (Second Round)	Lost	
2023	4	Mohamed Muizzu, candidate #4 in the 2023 elections, who won.	Mohamed Muizzu	PNC	Hussain Mohamed Latheef	101,635 (First Round) 129,159 (Second Round)	Won	
2023	5	Qasim Ibrahim, candidate #5 in the 2023 election.	Qasim Ibrahim	JP	Ameen Ibrahim	5,460	Lost	
2023	6	Ahmed Faris Maumoon, candidate #6 in the 2023 elections.	Ahmed Faris Maumoon	IND	Abdul Sattar Yoosuf	2,979	Lost	
2023	7	Ilyas Labeeb, candidate #7 in the 2023 elections.	Ilyas Labeeb	TD	Hussain Amr	15,839	Lost	
2023	8	Mohamed Nazim, candidate #8 in the 2023 elections.	Mohamed Nazim	MNP	Ahmed Adheel Naseer	1,907	Lost	

== See also ==
- President of the Maldives
- Elections in the Maldives
- List of presidents of the Maldives
