= List of presidents of the Maldives =

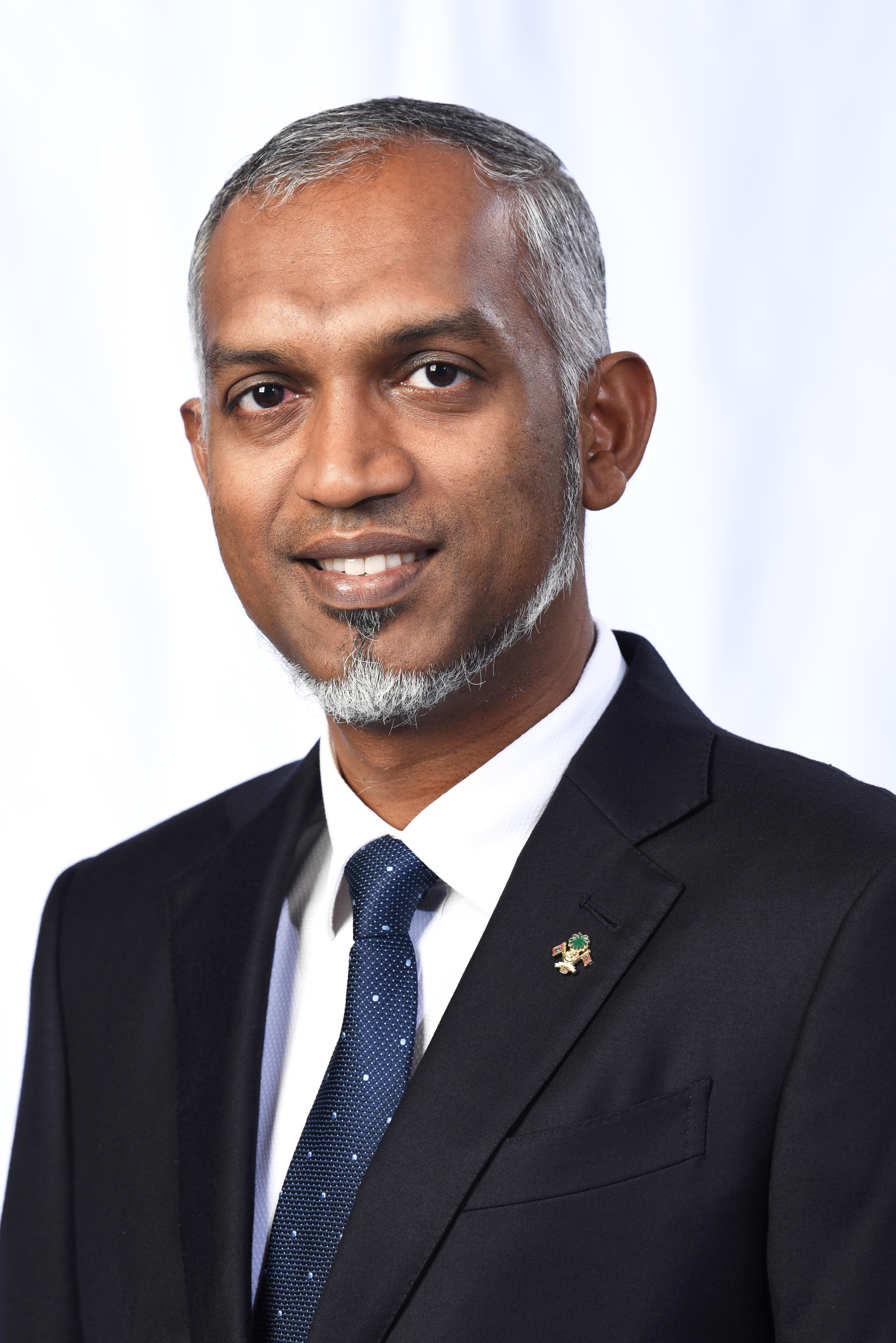
Mohamed Muizzu, President of the Maldives since 2023

The President of the Maldives is the head of state and head of government of the Republic of Maldives. The President is directly elected by the citizens of the country through a popular vote for a five-year term. The President serves as the commander-in-chief of the Maldives National Defence Force and leads the Cabinet. The powers of the President are derived from the latest constitution implemented in 2008.

During the early republic, executive authority in the Maldives was split between the President and the Prime Minister of the Maldives. The President served as the head of state while the Prime Minister served as the head of government. An amendment to the 1942 constitution transferred executive power of the country to the Ministry of Home Affairs, effectively making the Minister of Home Affairs the head of government. In 1951, the constitution was amended to revert the earlier amendment, making the Prime Minister the head of government. The role of Prime Minister during the republic was held by Ahmed Zaki from 1972 until its abolition in 1975 by President Ibrahim Nasir. The position was abolished because of abuses of the office.

The nation was previously a sultanate, ruled by a Sultan, before a constitutional referendum was held in 1952 to change the governance to a democracy. The First Republic of the Maldives was declared on 1 January 1953; the republic was abolished eight months later on 21 August 1953, when President Mohamed Amin Didi was beaten to death. After he died of his injuries, he was succeeded by then-Vice President of the Maldives, Ibrahim Muhammad Didi, as acting President. The monarchy was restored in another constitutional referendum the same year. Another constitutional referendum was held in 1968; the sultanate was abolished in favor of a return to a presidential republic. Since the declaration of the second republic in 1968, there have been seven Presidents as of October 2025.

A short-lived breakaway state called the United Suvadive Republic (1959–1963) was declared by the southern atolls of the Maldives (Addu, Fuvahmulah, and Huvadhu) due to discontent with the central government in Malé. Its first and last President was Abdullah Afeef who served from its creation until its abolition.

Since 1968, two Presidents (Ibrahim Nasir and Mohamed Nasheed) have resigned from the post. Mohamed Amin Didi was the shortest-serving President, serving for a total of 7 months and 21 days in 1953. Maumoon Abdul Gayoom served as President for 30 years, from 1978 to 2008, making him the longest-serving President and one of the longest-serving Presidents in Asia. The incumbent President is Mohamed Muizzu, who assumed office on 17 November 2023.

== Presidents ==
* Acting president

List of Presidents of the Maldives
No.	Portrait	Name (Birth–Death)	Party	Term of office		Vice President	Elected	Ref.
No.	Portrait	Name (Birth–Death)	Party	Took office	Left office	Vice President	Elected	Ref.
1	A portrait of Mohamed Amin Didi, the first president of the Maldives.	Mohamed Amin Didi (1910–1954)	Muthagaddim	1 January 1953	21 August 1953	Ibrahim Muhammad Didi	1952	
Vacant (21 August 1953–2 September 1953)
—	A portrait of Ibrahim Muhammad Didi, acting president of the Maldives.	Ibrahim Muhammad Didi* (1902–1981)	Muthagaddim	2 September 1953	7 March 1954	Vacant	—	
Position abolished (7 March 1954–11 November 1968) (Note: The monarchy was restored, and Muhammad Fareed Didi ruled as Sultan of the Maldives during this period (1954–1968). From 1958 to 1963, Abdullah Afeef served as President of the United Suvadive Republic, a breakaway state of the Maldives.)								
2	A portrait of Ibrahim Nasir, the second president of the Maldives.	Ibrahim Nasir (1926–2008)	Independent	11 November 1968	11 November 1978 (resigned)	Vacant until 1973 Abdul Sattar Moosa Didi Ahmed Hilmy Didi Ibrahim Shihab Ali Maniku Hassan Zareer	1968 1973	
3	A portrait of Maumoon Abdul Gayoom, the third president of the Maldives.	Maumoon Abdul Gayoom (b. 1937)	Independent People's	11 November 1978	11 November 2008	Vacant	1978 1983 1988 1993 1998 2003	
4	A portrait of Mohamed Nasheed, the fourth president of the Maldives.	Mohamed Nasheed (b. 1967)	Democratic	11 November 2008	7 February 2012 (resigned)	Mohamed Waheed Hassan	2008	
5	A portrait of Mohamed Waheed Hassan, the fifth president of the Maldives.	Mohamed Waheed Hassan (b. 1953)	Itthihaad	7 February 2012 (Note: Upon the resignation of his predecessor)	17 November 2013	Vacant until 25 April 2012 Mohamed Waheed Deen (Note: Appointed Vice President under the terms of Article 122 of the Constitution of the Maldives)	–	
6	A portrait of Abdulla Yameen, the sixth president of the Maldives.	Abdulla Yameen (b. 1959)	Progressive	17 November 2013	17 November 2018	Mohamed Jameel (Note: Removed from power on 21 July 2015 by President Yameen, through a vote taken in the People's Majlis) Ahmed Adeeb (Note: Removed from power on 5 November 2015 by President Yameen, through a vote taken in the People's Majlis, after he was allegedly involved in the failed assassination of Yameen) Vacant (Note: From 5 November 2015 until 22 June 2016) Abdulla Jihad (Note: Appointed as Vice President under the terms of Article 122 of the Constitution of the Maldives)	2013	
7	A portrait of Ibrahim Mohamed Solih, the seventh president of the Maldives.	Ibrahim Mohamed Solih (b. 1962)	Democratic	17 November 2018	17 November 2023	Faisal Naseem	2018	
8	A portrait of Mohamed Muizzu, the eighth president of the Maldives.	Mohamed Muizzu (b. 1978)	Congress	17 November 2023	Incumbent	Hussain Mohamed Latheef	2023	

== See also ==
- History of the Maldives
- Politics of the Maldives
- List of Maldivian monarchs
- President of the Maldives
- Vice President of the Maldives
  - List of vice presidents of the Maldives
