= Presidential elections in the Maldives =

Maldives head of government election

The election of the president and the vice president of the Maldives is presidential elections that determine who will serve as the President of the Maldives for the next 5 years (previously four terms in 1968).

The presidential elections has taken place thirteen times; 1952, 1968, 1973, 1978, 1983, 1988, 1993, 1998, 2003, 2008, 2013, 2018, 2023. Out of the 13 elections, the 2008 election was the first democratic elections of the country and after 2008, all elections were democratic. The next presidential election is scheduled for 2028.

== Eligibility ==
The Constitution of the Maldives lays out the requirements for presidential candidates:

- Be a Maldivian Citizen born to Maldivian parents;
- Not a citizen of another country;
- Be a Sunni Muslim;
- Be at least 35 years of age;
- Never been convicted of an offence for which Hadd is prescribed in Islam;
- Not been convicted of a criminal offence and sentenced to more than 12 months, unless been more than three years after release or pardoned.

== Procedure ==
=== Nomination of candidates ===
Candidates can be nominated by a political party or run as independent.

=== Political party ===
Political parties hold primaries. In these primaries, the members of the party, supporters participate in voting to determine who will represent the party in the Presidential Election.

=== Popular Vote ===
The president is elected by a direct vote. If no candidate receives more than 50% of a vote in the first round, the two candidates with the most votes head to a run-off which are mandated to be less than 21 days before the first round. The candidate who receives the highest in the second round is then elected as president.

=== Election calendar ===
These dates are corresponding the 2023 election:

- May 2 - June 2: Publishing voters registry.
- July 23 - August 3: Submitting presidential candidacy.
- July 25 - August 13: Nominating election observers and monitors.
- 10 August - September 3: Presidential campaign.
- September 9 - Voting Day (Round One)
- September 30 - Round Two (if neither candidate got 50% in Round One).
- November 17 - President Inauguration Day.

== See also ==
- President of the Maldives
- Elections in the Maldives
- List of Maldivian presidential candidates
- List of presidents of the Maldives
