= 1969 Maldivian parliamentary election =

Parliamentary elections were held in the Maldives in September 1969, the first under the 1968 constitution. The newly elected People's Majlis convened in February 1970.

== Background ==
The Maldives had become independent in 1965. A new constitution was approved in a March 1968 referendum, changing the country from a constitutional monarchy under Sultan Muhammad Fareed Didi into a republic. Prime Minister Ibrahim Nasir was chosen as president by the People's Majlis and then confirmed in a public vote in September 1968.

== Electoral system ==
The 1968 constitution provided for a People's Majlis with 46 elected members and eight appointed by the President. Eight were elected in Malé and two were elected from each of the 19 atolls, which formed two-member constituencies. Voters could vote for only one candidate.
