= 1973 Maldivian presidential election =

← 1968	September 1973	1978 →
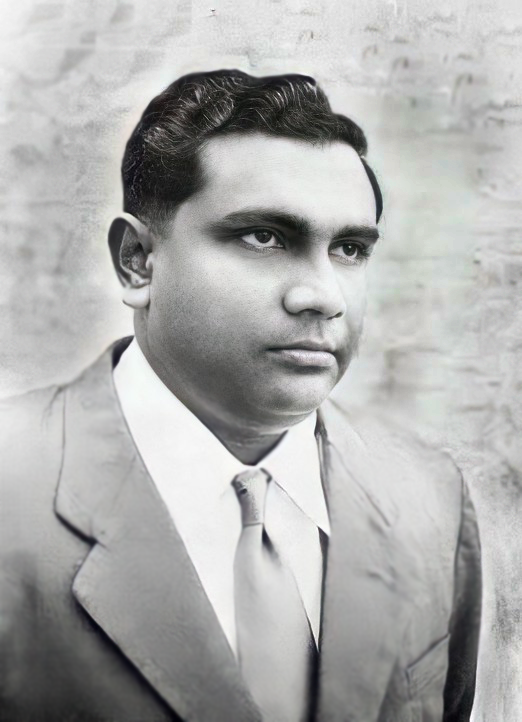
Candidate	Ibrahim Nasir
President before election
Ibrahim Nasir
Elected President
Ibrahim Nasir

Presidential elections were held in the Maldives in September 1973. The elections took the form of a referendum on the candidacy of incumbent president Ibrahim Nasir, who was re-elected.

== Background ==
Nasir had originally been elected for a four-year term in 1968. However, in 1972 a constitutional amendment was passed by the Majlis to extend the presidential term to five years.

The constitution required that the President be selected by the Majlis and then their candidacy confirmed through a referendum.
