= 1952 Maldivian presidential election =

- 1952
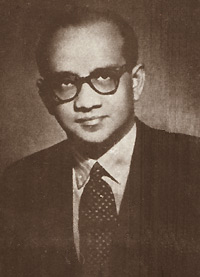
Candidate	Mohamed Amin Didi
Party	RMP
Percentage	96%
Elected President
Mohamed Amin Didi
RMP

Presidential elections were held for the first time in the Maldives in 1952. They followed the approval of a new constitution in a referendum in March 1952, which had changed the country's system of governance from being a monarchy to a republic.

The result was a victory for Mohamed Amin Didi, who received almost 96% of the vote. Amin Didi subsequently became the country's first President.
