= 1998 Maldivian presidential election =

← 1993	16 October 1998	2003 →
- Turnout: 76.06%
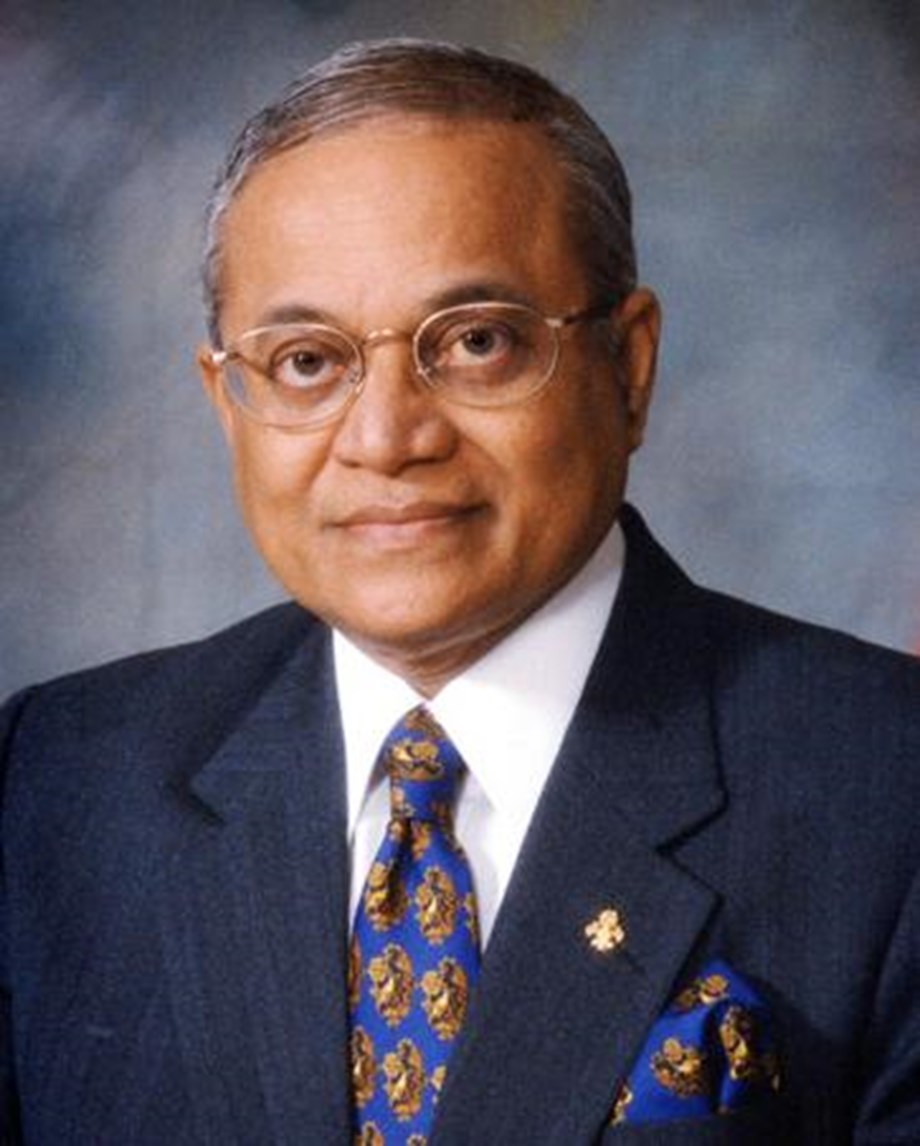
Candidate	Maumoon Abdul Gayoom
Party	Independent
Popular vote	86,504
Percentage	90.90%
President before election
Maumoon Abdul Gayoom
Independent
Elected President
Maumoon Abdul Gayoom
Independent

Presidential elections were held in the Maldives on 16 October 1998. Maumoon Abdul Gayoom was the sole candidate nominated by Parliament. His candidacy was approved by 90.9% of voters, with a turnout of 76%.

== Results ==
Candidate	Votes	%
Maumoon Abdul Gayoom	86,504	90.90
Against	8,664	9.10
Total	95,168	100.00
Valid votes	95,168	99.21
Invalid/blank votes	761	0.79
Total votes	95,929	100.00
Registered voters/turnout	126,128	76.06
Source: Nohlen et al.
