= 1978 Maldivian presidential election =

← 1973	28 July 1978	1983 →
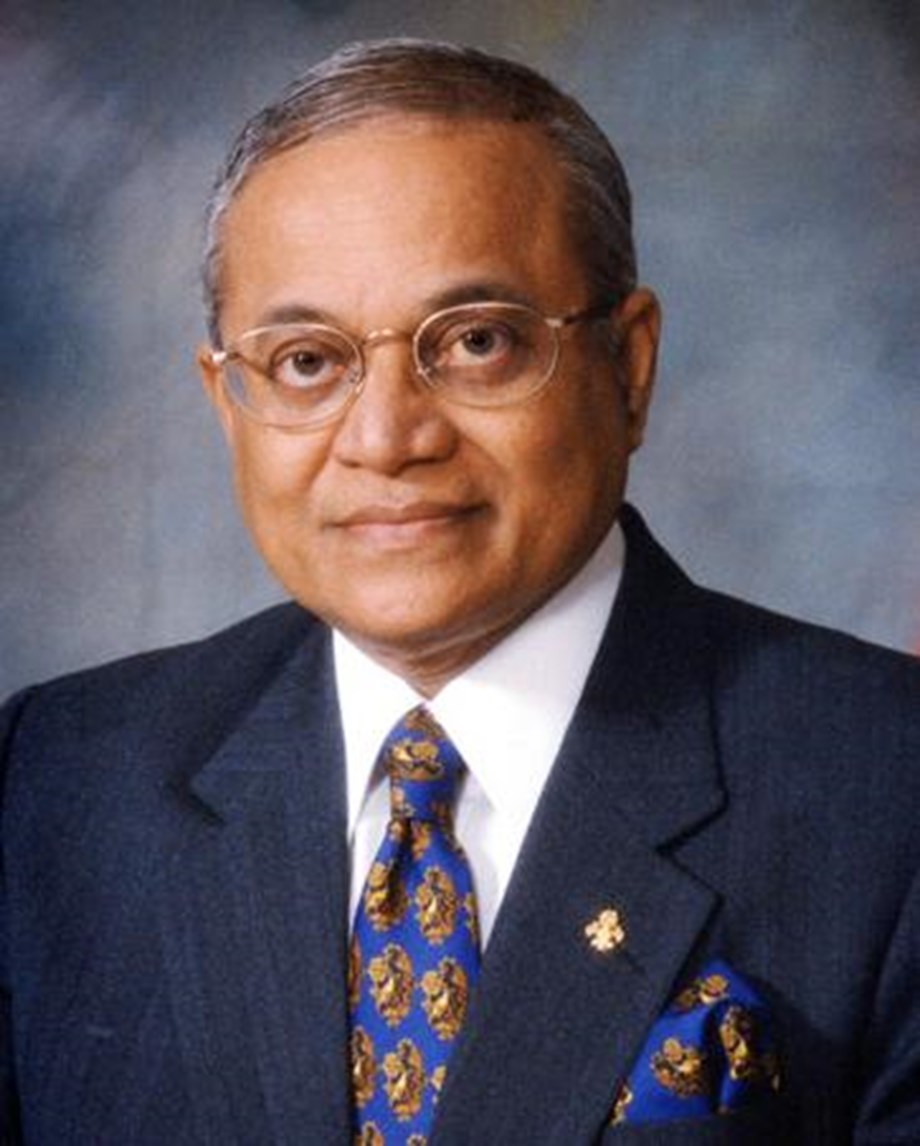
Candidate	Maumoon Abdul Gayoom
Party	Independent
Percentage	92.96%
President before election
Ibrahim Nasir
RMP
Elected President
Maumoon Abdul Gayoom
Independent

Presidential elections were held in the Maldives on 28 July 1978. The election took the form of a referendum on the candidacy of Maumoon Abdul Gayoom, who was elected with 92.96% of the vote.

== Background ==
Ibrahim Nasir had been elected President in 1973. Two years later he deposed Prime Minister Ahmed Zaki, who was seen as a threat due to his popularity, in a bloodless coup and banished him to a remote island.

The islands had begun to suffer economic problems during the 1970s, following the collapse of the Sri Lankan market for dried fish, the islands' main export, and the closure of the British air base RAF Gan. As a result, the Nasir regime began to lose popularity, and in 1978 he fled to Singapore, with a subsequent investigation revealing that he had taken with him several million dollars from the national treasury.

== Results ==
Candidate	Votes	%
Maumoon Abdul Gayoom		92.96
Against		7.04
Total		
Registered voters/turnout		–
Source: Direct Democracy
