= Ibrahim Muhammad Didi =

Vice President of the Maldives from 1953 to 1953

- އިބްރާހީމް މުޙައްމަދުދީދީ
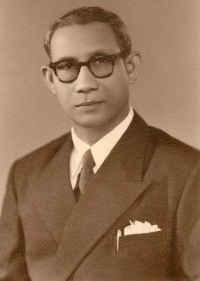
- Didi in 1953

Minister of Finance
- In office July 12, 1954 – November 27, 1955
- Monarch: Muhammad Fareed Didi
- Prime Minister: Ibrahim Ali Didi
- Preceded by: Mohamed Amin Didi
- Succeeded by: Summuvul Ameer Ibrahim Faamulaadheyri Kileygefaanu

Acting President of the Maldives
- In office September 2, 1953 – March 7, 1954
- Preceded by: Mohamed Amin Didi
- Succeeded by: Office abolished Maldives Sultanate (Muhammad Fareed Didi)

Vice President of the Maldives
- In office January 1, 1953 – September 2, 1953
- President: Mohamed Amin Didi
- Preceded by: Office established

Personal details
- Born: March 20, 1902 Malé, Maldives
- Died: October 6, 1981 (aged 79) Colombo, Sri Lanka
- Party: Rayyithunge Muthagaddim Party
- Religion: Islam

Ibrahim Muhammad Didi (Dhivehi: އިބްރާހީމް މުޙައްމަދުދީދީ; March 20, 1902 – October 6, 1981), also known as Velaanaagey Ibrahim Didi, was a Maldivian politician who served as the Vice President of Maldives from January 1, 1953 to September 2, 1953.

In a report, it was found that Didi along with Ibrahim Nasir, Mohamed Zaki, and Ibrahim Zaki planned and succeeded to overthrow Mohamed Amin Didi as President. They both planned to overthrow Amin due to disagreement of his use of state funds. The people told them not to let Amin in Malé, so as soon as Amin landed in RAF Gan he was taken to Dhoonidhoo. Amin secretly entered Malé and tried to establish order but no member in the Army listened to his commands and they and the Maldivian people beat Amin up. He was later taken to Vihamanaafushi, where he died.

He was appointed Minister of Finance of the Maldives Sultanate from July 1954 to November 1955.

Didi also served other ministerial positions such as Deputy Prime Minister, Minister of the Capital and Minister of Agriculture, and a member of the Senate of the Maldives elected by the Maldivian House of Representatives.
