= 1983 Maldivian presidential election =

← 1978	30 September 1983	1988 →
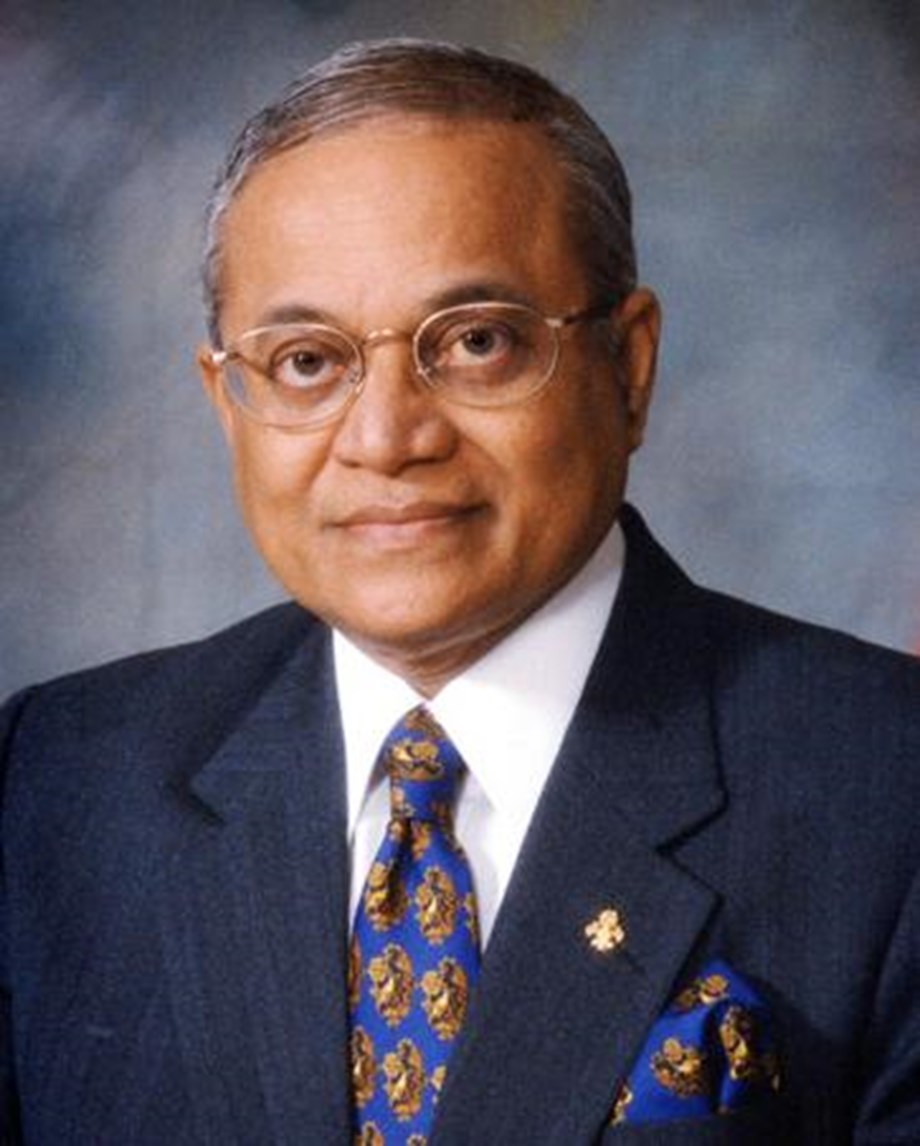
Candidate	Maumoon Abdul Gayoom
Party	Independent
Popular vote	57,913
Percentage	95.62%
President before election
Maumoon Abdul Gayoom
Independent
Elected President
Maumoon Abdul Gayoom
Independent

Presidential elections were held in the Maldives on 30 September 1983. Maumoon Abdul Gayoom was the sole candidate nominated by Parliament. His candidacy was approved by 95.6% of voters.

== Results ==
Candidate	Votes	%
Maumoon Abdul Gayoom	57,913	95.62
Against	2,651	4.38
Total	60,564	100.00
Source: Direct Democracy
