= 1988 Maldivian presidential election =

← 1983	23 September 1988	1993 →
- Turnout: 83.03%
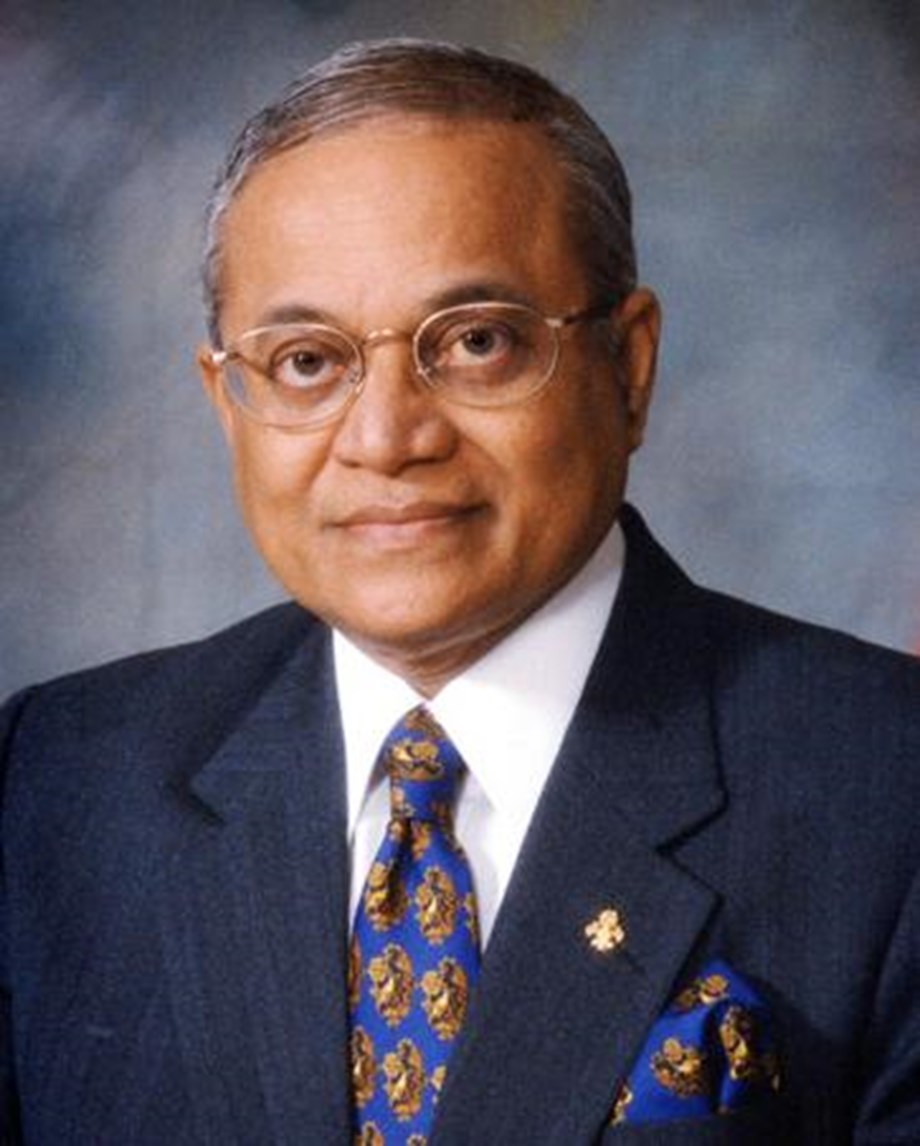
Candidate	Maumoon Abdul Gayoom
Party	Independent
Popular vote	69,373
Percentage	96.47%
President before election
Maumoon Abdul Gayoom
Independent
Elected President
Maumoon Abdul Gayoom
Independent

Presidential elections were held in the Maldives on 23 September 1988. Maumoon Abdul Gayoom was the sole candidate nominated by Parliament. His candidacy was approved by 96.4% of voters.

== Results ==
Candidate	Votes	%
Maumoon Abdul Gayoom	69,373	96.47
Against	2,537	3.53
Total	71,910	100.00
Valid votes	71,910	99.41
Invalid/blank votes	429	0.59
Total votes	72,339	100.00
Registered voters/turnout	87,123	83.03
Source: Direct Democracy
