= Rayyithunge Muthagaddim Party =

Political party in Maldives from 1951 to 1954

Rayyithunge Muthagaddim Party ރައްޔިތުންގެ މުތަޤައްދިމް ޕާޓީ
- Abbreviation: RMP
- President: Mohamed Amin Didi
- Founded: 23 September 1951
- Dissolved: 1954
- Headquarters: Malé, Maldives
- Membership: 4741
- Ideology: Nationalism; Republicanism

Rayyithunge Muthagaddim Party (RMP; English: Peoples' Progressive Party, or Peoples' Progress Party) was the first political party formed in the Maldives.

Despite the government of Mohamed Amin Didi theoretically operating within a democratic system of governance, the party had no official opposition parties from formation to dissolution, and was the only party in the First Republic of the Maldives. This could have been because there was no straightforward approach towards organizing and forming political parties within the political system back then.

== History ==
The party was registered on 23 September 1951 and officially commenced on 9 October 1951 with Mohamed Amin Didi and Ibrahim Muhammad Didi as the President and Chief Vice President respectively.

The party's objection was written in the handbook to find a way to benefit the country and the people, promote unity among the people.

Throughout Maldivian history, families were ruled were "parties". Although RMP was officially the first political party, it wasn't the first group in history as the country has been ruled in groups based on family ties. Such political families had major leadership roles in the government such as the Athireege family, Kakkaage family, and the Eggamuge family.

The party was dissolved in 1954 after Amin Didi was deposed as president of the Maldives by a group of people and the Maldives was restored to a sultanate, marking the end of the first Republic.

== Leadership ==
Party President:

- Mohamed Amin Didi

Chief Vice President:

- Ibrahim Muhammad Didi

Second Vice President:

- Mr. Ahmed Hilmy Didi

Honorary Vice Presidents:

- Annabeela Aminath Hussain
- Annabeela Zubeida Mohamed Didi
- Mr Ahmed Kamil Didi
- Sheikh Malin Moosa Maafahaiy Kaleyfan
- Mr Adam Naseer Maniku

Party Secretaries:

- Annabeel Hassan Ali Didi
- Mr Ibrahim Shihab

Treasurer:

- Mr Kudadhaharaagey Ibrahim Didi

Publicity Secretary:

- Mr N.T. Hassan Didi

Consultative Committee:

- Annabeela Fathmath Ibrahim Didi
- Annabeela Fathmath Saeed (Party President's senior wife)
- Miss Aminath Faiza
- Annabeel Abdul Wahhab
- Mr Adam Naseer Maniku
- Mr Ahmed Hilmy Didi
- Mr Bandhu Mohamed Kaleyfan
- Mr Bucha Hassan Kaleyfan
- Mr Kerafa Mohamed Kaleyfan
- Mr Kateeb Don Kaleyfan
- Mr Maarandu Mudin Kaleyfan
- Mr Feeali Kateeb Kaleyfan
- Mr Havaru-Thinadu Abdulla Kateeb Manikfan
- Mr Bilal Tuttu Maniku
- Mr Maizan Mohamed Maniku
- Mr Tutteedi Don Maniku
