= 1993 Maldivian presidential election =

← 1988	1 October 1993	1998 →
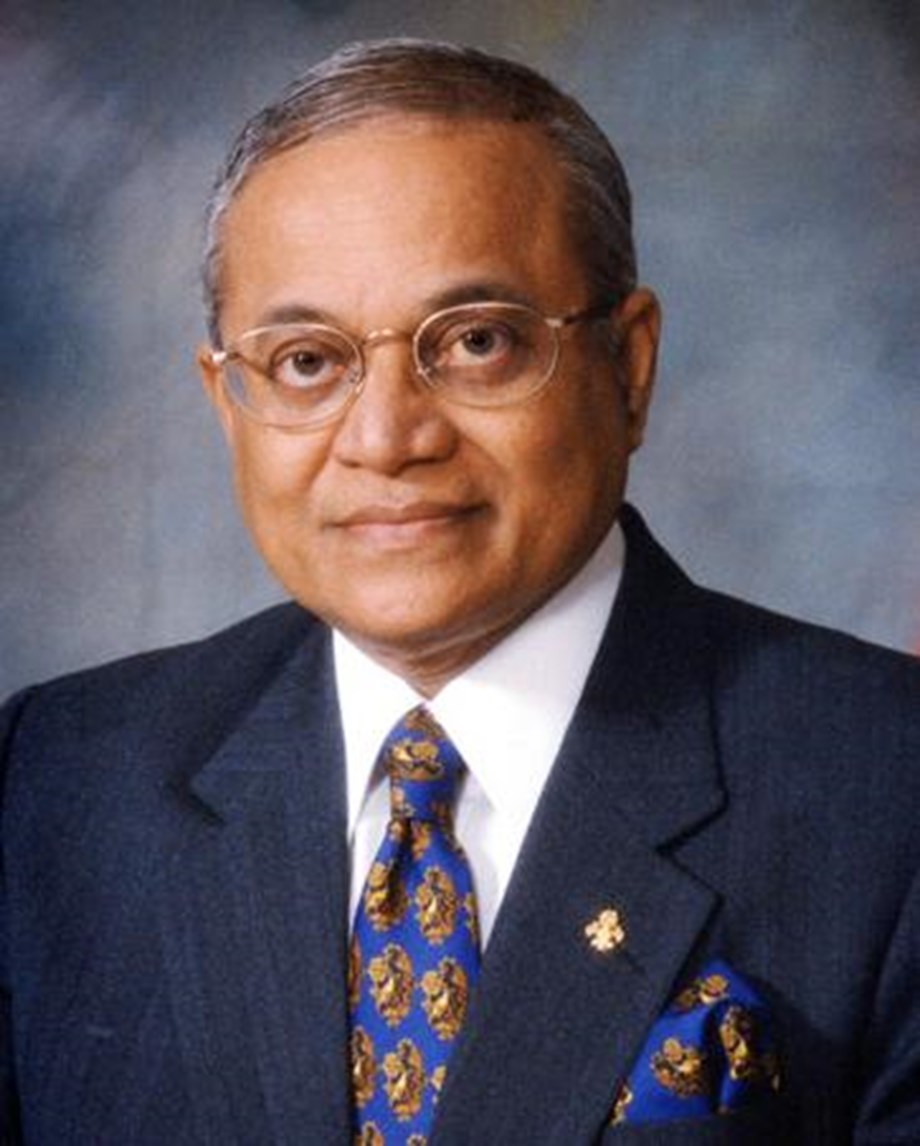
Candidate	Maumoon Abdul Gayoom
Party	Independent
Percentage	92.8%
President before election
Maumoon Abdul Gayoom
Independent
Elected President
Maumoon Abdul Gayoom
Independent

Presidential elections were held in the Maldives on 1 October 1993. Maumoon Abdul Gayoom was the sole candidate nominated by Parliament. His candidacy was approved by 92.8% of voters.

== Results ==
Candidate	Votes	%
Maumoon Abdul Gayoom		92.8
Against		7.2
Total		
Registered voters/turnout	105,456	–
Source: Nohlen et al., Eur
