= 1968 Maldivian presidential election =

- 27 September 1968
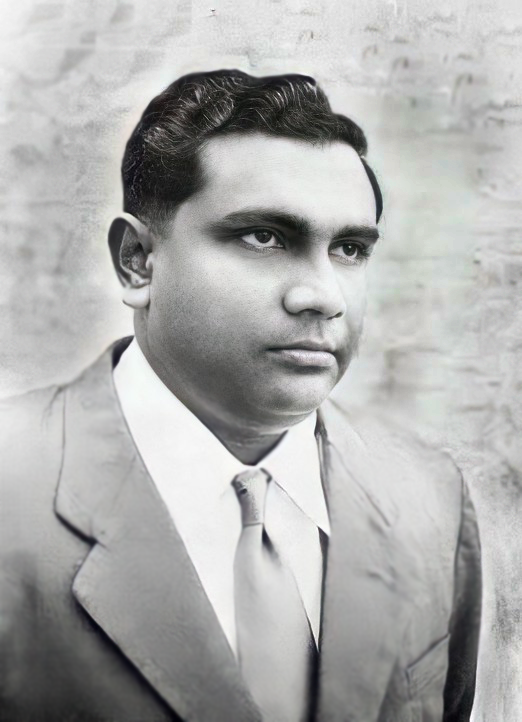
Candidate	Ibrahim Nasir
Percentage	97.16%
Elected President
Ibrahim Nasir

Presidential elections were held in the Maldives on 27 September 1968. The election took the form of a referendum on the candidacy of Ibrahim Nasir, who was supported by 97% of voters. The country was declared a republic on 11 November.

== Background ==
A referendum in March had resulted in a large majority (81%) voting in favour of replacing the sultanate with a republic. On 9 September the Majlis held a vote on the presidential candidates, with Nasir receiving 35 votes and Musa Fathi one vote.

In accordance with the constitution, a referendum was subsequently held on Nasir's candidacy.

== Results ==
Candidate	Votes	%
Ibrahim Nasir		97.16
Against		2.84
Total		
Registered voters/turnout		99.00
Source: Direct Democracy
