= List of speakers of the People's Majlis =

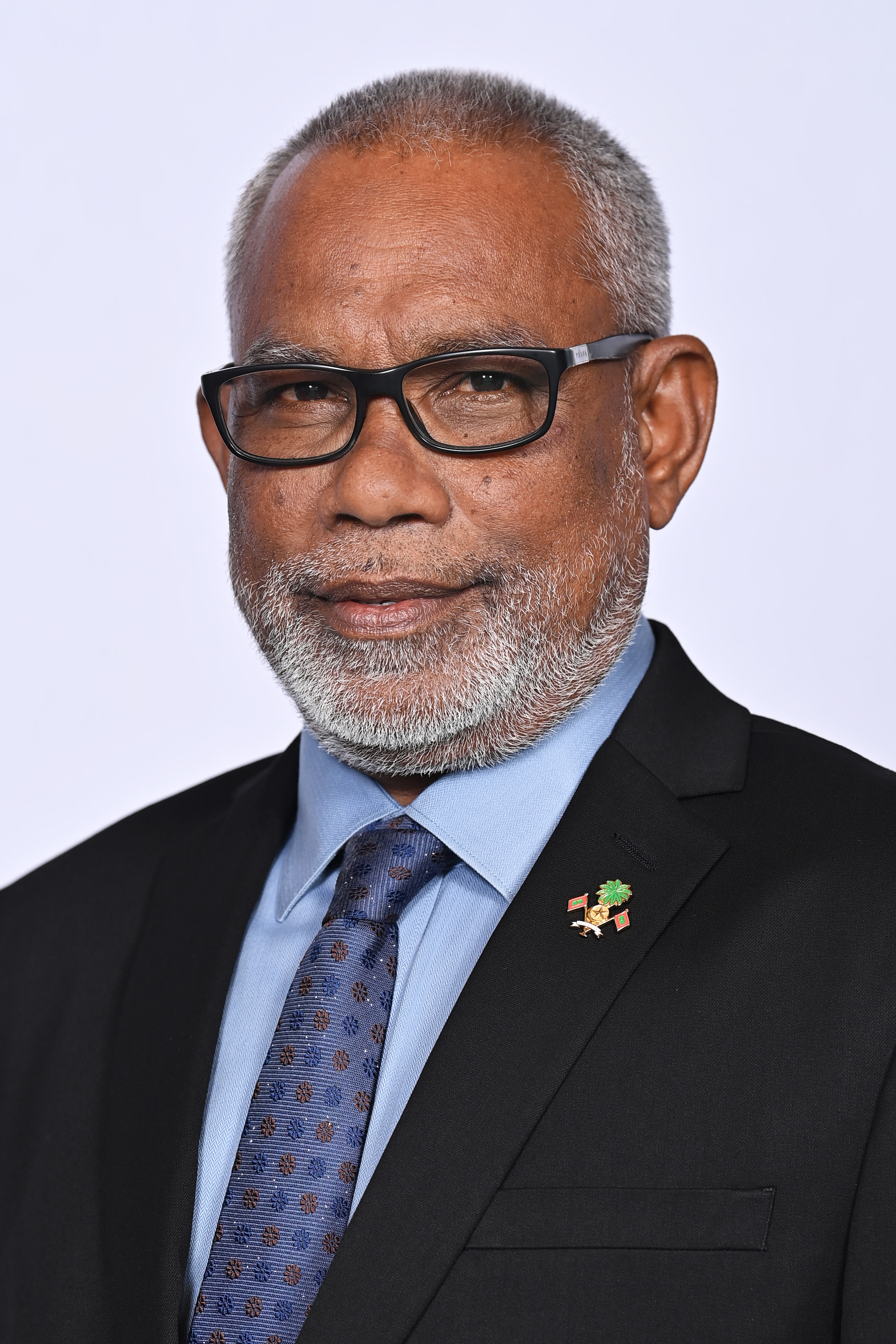
Abdul Raheem Abdulla, Speaker of the People's Majlis since 2026

The Speaker of the People's Majlis is the presiding officer of the People's Majlis, the unicameral legislature of the Maldives. The Speaker is directly elected by the members of the People's Majlis during the first session after each parliamentary election. Until then, the longest consecutively serving member will be presiding over the legislature.

The Speaker or any other person presiding may not vote on any question unless if there is a tie, otherwise he can vote. However, the Speaker can vote if there is a question that must be decided be two-thirds or three-quarters majority of the members.

King Muhammad Shamsuddeen III set up a council which was tasked to create the first constitution of the Maldives. After the constitution was approved, Muhammad Fareed Didi who was part of the council, assumed as the inaugural holder of the Speaker of the Majlis.

During the First Republic of the Maldives, a bicameral legislature was added in the 1953 constitution which included an upper house as the Senate and a lower house as the People's Assembly. The First Republic was later dissolved along with that year's constitution. Fathimath Ibrahim Didi served as the President of the Senate from 1953 to 1954.

After the first multi-party parliamentary election, the Majlis elected Abdulla Shahid as the Speaker of the People's Majlis on 28 May 2009.

On 27 May 2014, Abdulla Maseeh Mohamed was elected as the Majlis speaker. In 2017, a no confidence motion was brought up against him for alleged unfair conduct, disregard of the rule of law and parliamentary procedures as well as his role in eroding checks and balances and “subverting Maldivian democracy”. During the voting of the no confidence motion, the electronic voting system wasn't working which caused many opposition MPs to walk out or get evicted. They accused the government of tampering with the system to circumvent the vote. Thirteen opposition MPs were evicted for "disorderly conduct", according to Deputy Speaker Ahmed Nihan. The U.S. government and the British Embassy to the Maldives echoed concerns about the irregularities in the vote. A motion of no confidence was scheduled against Mohamed again in 2018, but he resigned before the motion could take place. Qasim Ibrahim was elected the Speaker following Mohamed's resignation.

On 28 May 2019, former President Mohamed Nasheed was elected the new Speaker of the People's Majlis. In June 2023, the Maldivian Democratic Party MPs filed a no confidence motion against him, with members being concerned about how he has been conducting the parliamentary session. They later withdrew the motion. In October 2023, a new no confidence motion was filed against him, alleging repeated irregular conduct of meetings. The no confidence vote was later stalled as then-Deputy Speaker of the Majlis and Nasheed's cousin, Eva Abdulla, called in sick. The MDP accused Nasheed and Abdulla of stalling the vote. The MDP later filed a case at the Supreme Court of the Maldives, where they ruled that the motion was halted in violation of law. Nasheed later resigned before the vote took place. Mohamed Aslam was elected as the Speaker following Nasheed's resignation.

The incumbent Speaker is Abdul Raheem Abdulla, assuming office on 28 May 2024.

== List ==
Speakers of the People's Majlis
No.	Portrait	Name (Birth–Death)	Party	Term of office		Deputy Speaker	Ref.
No.	Portrait	Name (Birth–Death)	Party	Took office	Left office	Deputy Speaker	Ref.
1	Muhammad Fareed Didi, first speaker of the People's Majlis	Muhammad Fareed Didi (1901–1968)	Independent	21 October 1933	25 June 1942	Unknown	
2	Ahmed Kaamil Didi, second speaker of the People's Majlis	Ahmed Kaamil Didi	Independent	27 June 1942	29 October 1944	Unknown	
3	Ibrahim Ali Didi, third speaker of the People's Majlis	Ibrahim Ali Didi (1887–1975)	Independent	30 October 1944	7 November 1945	Unknown	
4	Ali Kudaran'nabandeyri Kilegefaanu, fourth Speaker of the People's Majlis	Ali Kudaran'nabandeyri Kileygefaanu	Independent	8 November 1945	3 March 1948	Unknown	
5	Mohamed Naseer Manik, fifth Speaker of the People's Majlis	Mohamed Naseer Manik	Independent	12 April 1948	12 April 1952	Unknown	
6	Malim Moosa Maafayeh Kaleygefaanu, sixth Speaker of the People's Majlis	Malim Moosa Maafayeh Kaleygefaanu	Independent	13 April 1952	21 October 1953	Unknown	
7	Ibrahim Fareed Didi, seventh Speaker of the People's Majlis	Ibrahim Fareed Didi	Independent	1 March 1954	3 October 1959	Unknown	
8	Ahmed Zaki, eighth and twelfth Speaker of the People's Majlis	Ahmed Zaki (1931–1996)	Independent	3 October 1959	1 August 1972	Unknown	
9	Ahmed Shathir, ninth Speaker of the People's Majlis	Ahmed Shathir (died 1994)	Independent	1 August 1972	11 November 1982	Unknown	
10	Ibrahim Shihab, tenth Speaker of the People's Majlis	Ibrahim Shihab (1922–1988)	Independent	11 November 1982	15 January 1988	Unknown	
11	Abdulla Hameed, eleventh and thirteenth Speaker of the People's Majlis	Abdulla Hameed (1939–2015)	Independent	14 February 1988	22 February 1990	Unknown	
12	Ahmed Zaki, eighth and twelfth Speaker of the People's Majlis	Ahmed Zaki (1931–1996)	Independent	22 February 1990	11 November 1993	Unknown	
13	Abdulla Hameed, eleventh and thirteenth Speaker of the People's Majlis	Abdulla Hameed (1939–2015)	Independent	11 November 1993	13 September 2004	Abdul Rasheed Hussain (2000–2005)	
14	Ahmed Zahir, fourteenth Speaker of the People's Majlis	Ahmed Zahir	Independent	13 September 2004	6 August 2008	Abdul Rasheed Hussain (2000–2005)	
15	Mohamed Shihab, fifteenth Speaker of the People's Majlis	Mohamed Shihab (born 1957)	Republican	12 August 2008	28 May 2009	Aneesa Ahmed	
16	Abdulla Shahid, sixteenth Speaker of the People's Majlis	Abdulla Shahid (born 1962)	Rayyithunge Democratic	28 May 2009	28 May 2014	Ahmed Nazim	
17	Abdulla Maseeh Mohamed, seventeenth Speaker of the People's Majlis	Abdulla Maseeh Mohamed (born 1962)	Progressive	28 May 2014	1 November 2018	Moosa Manik	
18	Qasim Ibrahim, the eighteenth Speaker of the People's Majlis	Qasim Ibrahim (born 1951)	Republican	1 November 2019	27 May 2019	Moosa Manik	
19	Mohamed Nasheed, ninteenth Speaker of the People's Majlis	Mohamed Nasheed (born 1967)	Democratic Democrats	28 May 2019	13 November 2023	Eva Abdulla	
20	Mohamed Aslam, twentieth Speaker of the People's Majlis	Mohamed Aslam	Democratic	14 November 2023	28 May 2024	Ahmed Saleem	
21	Abdul Raheem Abdulla, twenty first speaker of the People's Majlis	Abdul Raheem Abdulla (born 1967)	Congress	28 May 2024	Incumbent	Ahmed Nazim (2024–2026); Ahmed Saleem (2026–present)	

== See also ==
- Politics of the Maldives
- People's Majlis
- Speaker of the People's Majlis
- President of the Maldives
  - List of presidents of the Maldives
- Vice President of the Maldives
  - List of vice presidents of the Maldives
