= Ibrahim Shujau =

Maldivian parliamentarian

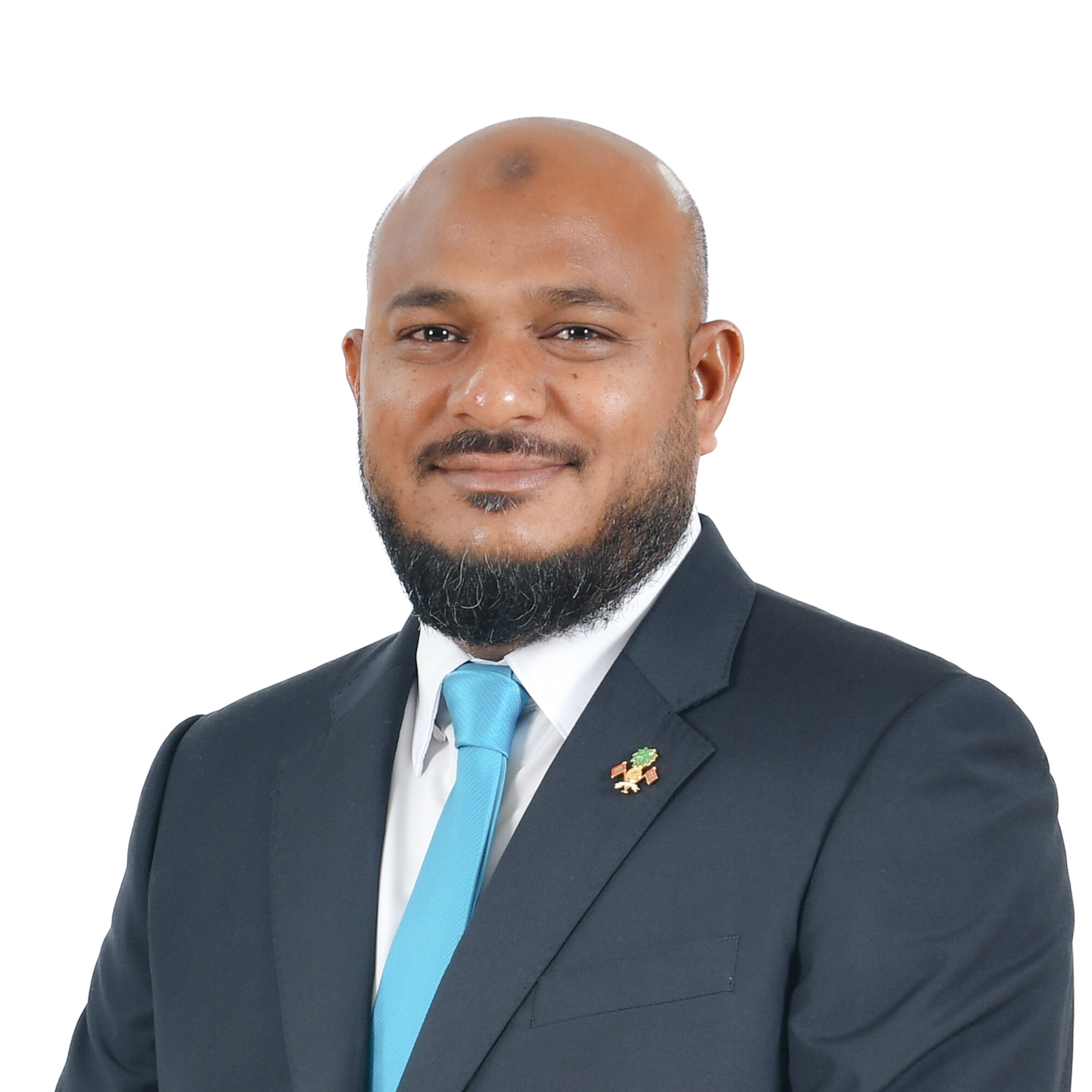
- Official portrait, 2024

Member of the Maldivian Parliament for Baarah
- Incumbent
- Assumed office 28 May 2024
- President: Mohamed Muizzu
- Speaker: Abdul Raheem Abdulla
- Preceded by: Ahmed Abdulla
- In office 28 May 2014 – 28 May 2019
- President: Abdulla Yameen; Ibrahim Mohamed Solih
- Speaker: Abdulla Maseeh Mohamed; Qasim Ibrahim
- Succeeded by: Ahmed Abdulla

Vice President of the People's National Congress
- Incumbent
- Assumed office 5 October 2023 Serving with Hussain Mohamed Latheef; Mohamed Saeed; Mohamed Hussain Shareef
- President: Mohamed Muizzu

Personal details
- Born: Baarah, Haa Alif Atoll, Maldives
- Party: Congress
- Other political affiliations: Progressive

Ibrahim Shujau is a Maldivian politician who is currently serving as a member of the People's Majlis for Baarah constituency since 2024, and from 2014 to 2019. He is also an vice president of the People's National Congress, and was a councilor for Hulhumalé in the Malé city council.

== Career ==
In 2014, Shujau was elected to the People's Majlis. He was sworn in on 28 May 2014. In 2019, Shujau lost the 2019 parliamentary elections. In 2024, Shujau was reelected to the People's Majlis, with the highest number of votes.

In 2026, Shujau was reelected as one of the vice presidents of the PNC.

== Controversies ==
=== Allegations of Favoritism ===
In 2024, Shujau faced allegations of using political influence to secure government contracts for associates during the party's administration. According to local newspaper Adhadhu, Official Events, a company owned by Baarashu MP Ibrahim Shujau, received MVR 4.4 million to manage the Maldives Sports Awards.

=== Corruption allegations ===
In August 2025, an alleged document from the Financial Intelligence Unit (FIU) of the Maldives Monetary Authority reporting transactions involving in companies he's involved in. Shujau denies corruption allegations.

Following this, Shujau was removed from both the Parliament's Public Accounts Committee and the State Owned Enterprises Committee.

The Anti-Corruption Commission and the Maldives Police Service launched an investigation into Shujau and his financial transactions.
