= Fathimath Saudha =

MP for Nilandhoo constituency since 2024

- ފާތިމަތު ސައުދާ

Member of the People's Majlis
- Incumbent
- Assumed office 28 May 2024
- President: Mohamed Muizzu
- Speaker: Abdul Raheem Abdulla
- Constituency: Nilandhoo

Deputy Minister at the Ministry of Health
- In office 22 September 2016 – 17 November 2018
- President: Abdulla Yameen

Personal details
- Born: Maafannu, Malé, Maldives
- Party: People's National Congress (2023–present)
- Other political affiliations: Adhaalath Party (2009–2015); Progressive Party of Maldives (2015–2023)
- Education: University of Mysore (BPsych); Coventry University (M.A.)

Fathimath Saudha (Dhivehi: ފާތިމަތު ސައުދާ) is a Maldivian politician who has served as the member of the People's Majlis for Nilandhoo constituency since 2024.

== Early life and education ==
Saudha was born in Maafannu, Malé. She is the younger sister of president Mohamed Muizzu. She obtained her Bachelor of Psychology from the University of Mysore, and her master's degree in clinic and counselling psychology from Coventry University.

== Career ==
Saudha started her political career in 2009 in the Adhaalath Party (AP) as a member of the party's Women's Committee. She later left AP and joined the Progressive Party of Maldives (PPM) in 2015 after the two party's coalition ended. In 2016, she was appointed as the Deputy Minister at the Ministry of Health.

Saudha also worked as an Assistant Psychologist and a part time lecturer at Avid College and the Maldives National University. She also worked at the Disability Council, Maldives Allied Health Council, served as the chair of the Social Sector Council of the Maldives National Skill Development Authority, and a member of the National Trade and Testing Certification.

In 2023, Saudha won the primary in the People's National Congress (PNC) and was the party's representative in the 2024 parliamentary election for Nilandhoo constituency. She later won the seat for the constituency and is currently serving as the MP for Nilandhoo. She was also elected as a member of the Inter-Parliamentary Union's Forum of Young Parliamentarians' Asia Pacific group.

In 2026, she was elected as one of the vice presidents of the PNC.

== Parliamentary career ==
Saudha was officially sworn in as the MP for Nilandhoo on 28 May 2024. She's currently a member of the Committee on Social Affairs, Committee on Decentralization, Committee on Human Rights and Gender, and the Committee of the Whole House. She proposed a bill that amended the Copyright and Related Rights Act which increased fines and increased protections for copyright.
