= Sappe =

Sappe or Sappé may refer to:

- Sappe, French term for sap, a trench dug towards an enemy position during sapping
- Sappe (company), a Thai company, producer of the Mogu Mogu drink
- Ahmed Shafeeq Ibrahim Moosa, a Maldivian politician known as Sappé
