= Ahmed Saleem (Eydhafushi politician) =

Deputy Speaker of the People's Majlis since 2026

- އަޙްމަދު ސަލީމް
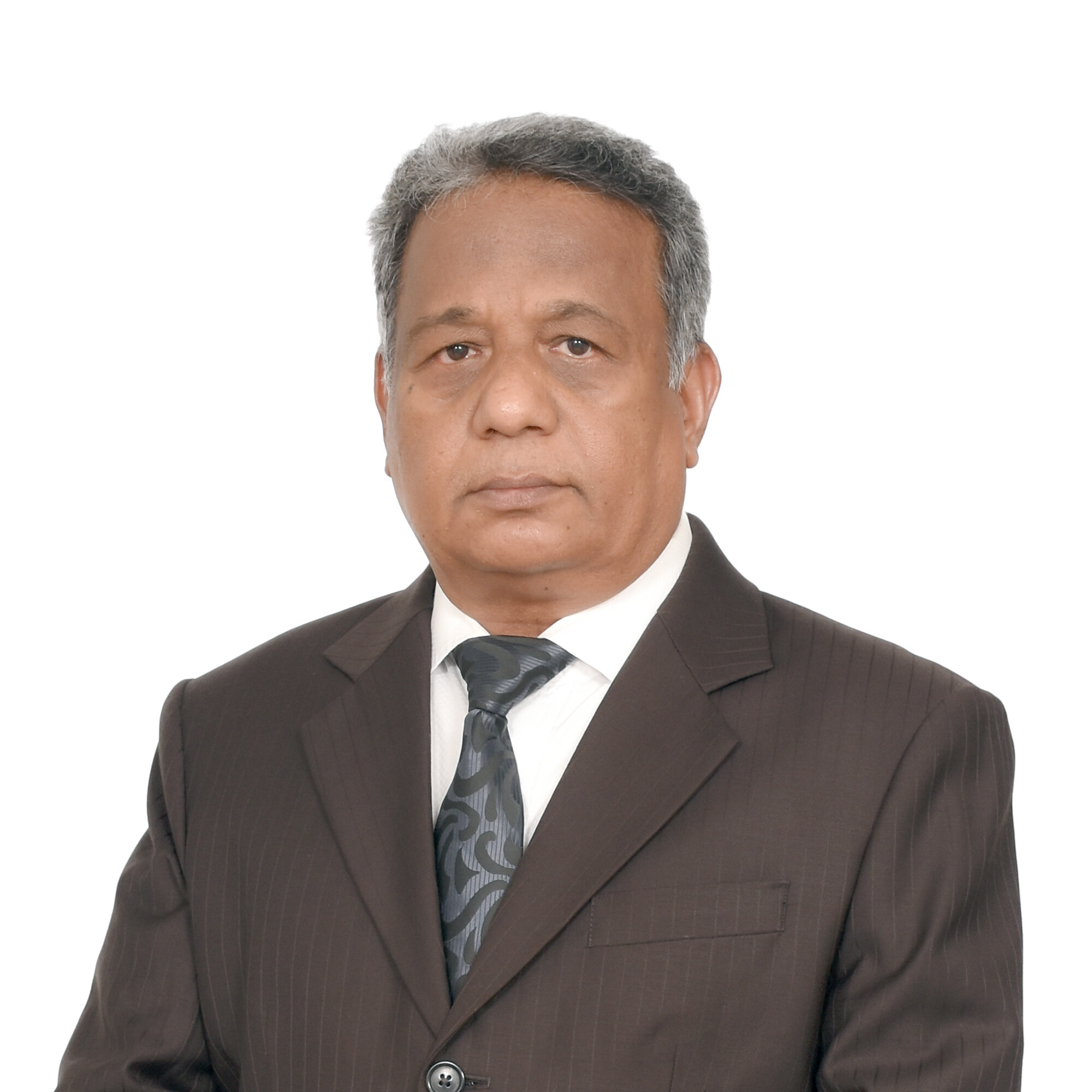
- Official portrait, 2024

Deputy Speaker of the People's Majlis
- Incumbent
- Assumed office 1 June 2026
- Speaker: Abdul Raheem Abdulla
- Preceded by: Ahmed Nazim

Member of the People's Majlis
- Incumbent
- Assumed office 28 May 2009
- Constituency: Eydhafushi

Personal details
- Party: People's National Congress (2023–present)
- Other political affiliations: Progressive (2011–2023); Maldivian Labour Party (2008–2011)

Ahmed Saleem (Dhivehi: އަޙްމަދު ސަލީމް), popularly known as Redwave Saleem is a Maldivian politician and businessman who is currently serving as the Deputy Speaker of the People's Majlis since 2026. A member of the People's National Congress. he's been serving as the member of the People's Majlis for the Eydhafushi constituency since 2009.

== Career ==
Saleem founded the Maldivian Labour Party in 2008. Saleem first ran in the 2009 parliamentary election for the Eydhafushi constituency as part of the Maldivian Labour Party, where he won 42.77% of the vote.

In 2011, he joined the Progressive Party of Maldives (PPM). Saleem ran again in the 2014 parliamentary election on behalf of the PPM, where he won with 1635 votes.

In 2019, Saleem ran for that year's parliamentary election where he won with 1604 votes. During that year, he was elected as the parliamentary group leader of the PPM's parliamentary group. He was also designated as the minority leader of the Majlis.

During his term, he met with a group of protestors while he was the chair of the Majlis's Environment Committee to discuss their demands, called on President Ibrahim Mohamed Solih to resign as he failed to investigate the Maldives Marketing and Public Relations Corporation scandal, the presence of Indian military personnel in Maldives, lack of further development in Hulhumalé, as well as failure to express the current state of the country, he also called on the salary of public officials to be cut to under MVR 20,000.

In 2024, Saleem secured tickets to contend in the 2024 parliamentary election without a primary, as part of the PPM-PNC coalition. He later won with 1197 votes. Saleem was later appointed to chair the 241 Committee and the vice chair of Public Accounts Committee.

In 2026, Ibrahim Falah nominated Saleem as the Deputy Speaker of the People's Majlis. He later won with a majority vote of 62.

== Controversies ==
=== Assassination allegations ===
Former Head of Intelligence Chief Superintendent ‘MC’ Mohamed Hameed alleged in the People's Majlis's Executive Oversight Committee in 2013 that Saleem stored a poisonous chemical in his company's warehouse in 2011 to assassinate President Mohamed Nasheed. Saleem denied the allegations and has stated that the statements given by intelligence chiefs of police and the defence forces caused him losses of millions in a business which he holds a stake in. He later said that he would be filing cases against the Maldivian Democratic Party and other persons he held responsible with the Civil Court.
