= Ahmed Nazim =

Deputy Speaker of the People's Majlis (2009–2014; 2024–2026)

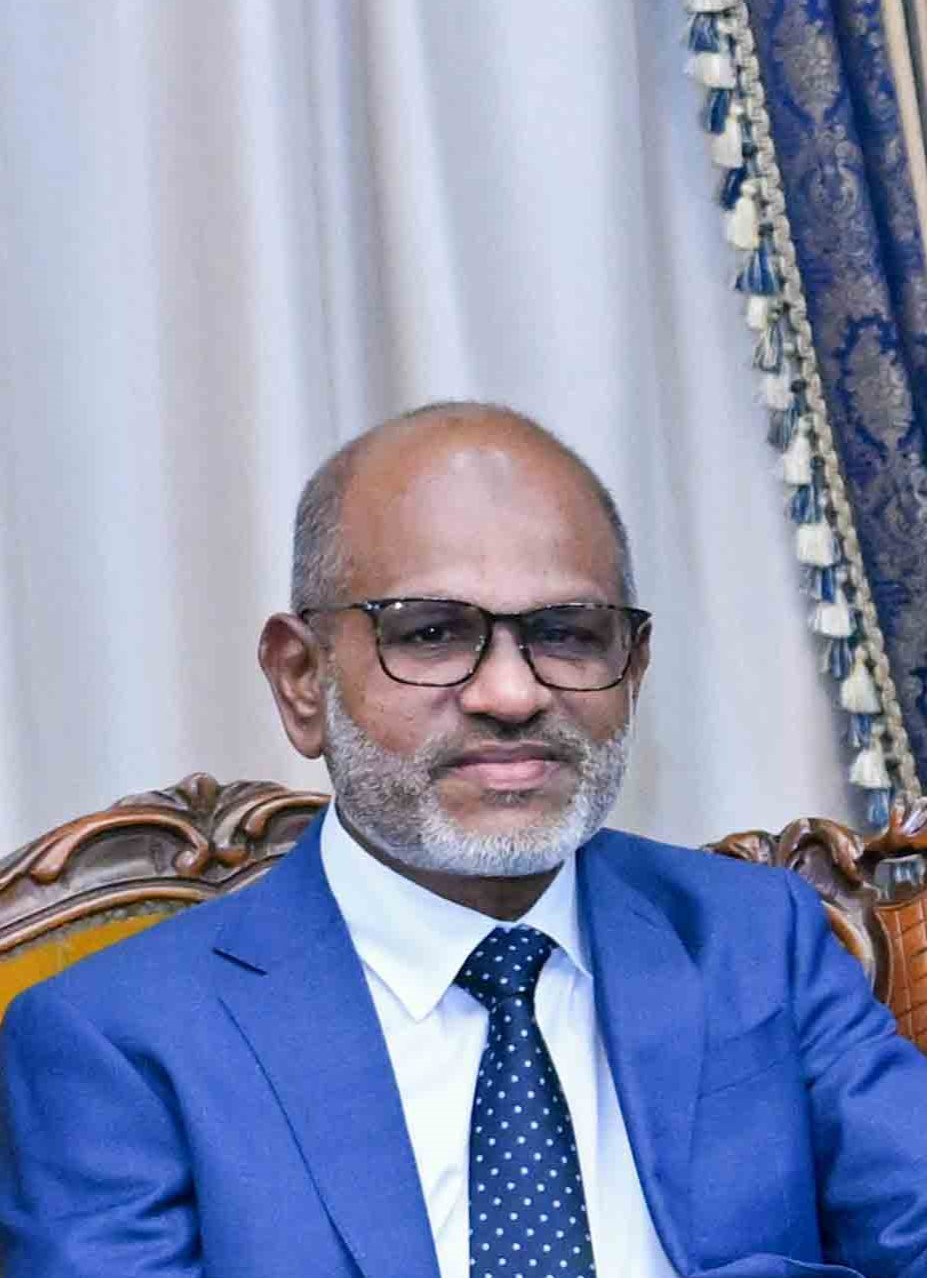
- Nazim in 2024

Deputy Speaker of the People's Majlis
- In office 28 May 2024 – 31 May 2026
- Speaker: Abdul Raheem Abdulla
- Preceded by: Ahmed Saleem
- Succeeded by: Ahmed Saleem
- In office 29 May 2009 – 28 May 2014
- Preceded by: Aneesa Ahmed
- Succeeded by: Moosa Manik

Member of the People's Majlis
- Incumbent
- Assumed office 28 May 2024
- Preceded by: Ikram Hassan
- Constituency: Dhiggaru
- In office 27 February 2000 – 28 May 2014
- Constituency: Meemu Atoll (2000–2009); Dhiggaru (2009–2014)

Personal details
- Born: 24 November 1968 (age 57)
- Party: Congress
- Other political affiliations: Progressive

Ahmed Nazim (born 24 November 1968) is a Maldivian politician who has served as the Deputy Speaker of the People's Majlis from 2024 to 2026, and previously from 2009 to 2014. He has also represented the Dhiggaru Constituency as a Member of the People's Majlis during 17th parliament from 2009 to 2014, and again since 2024.

Nazim is twice the Deputy Speaker of the People's Majlis, first from 2009 to 2015, under the speakership of Abdulla Shahid in the 17th Parliament and was elected as deputy speaker again on 28 May 2024 in the 20th Parliament. He has also served as member of the parliament for Dhiggaru constituency in the 17th and 20th parliaments.

He was sworn is as the Member of parliament for Dhiggaru Constituency on 28 May 2024. He was elected as Deputy Speaker of the People's Majlis among members on 28 May 2024.

In 2026, a rumour had been speculating that an effort to relieve Nazim of his position as the Deputy Speaker had begun after her was suddenly dismissed from two committees in the Majlis, which the People's National Congress (PNC)'s parliamentary group leader Ibrahim Falah denied. A motion was later submitted by the PNC to dismiss Nazim as the Deputy Speaker, claiming that he abused his position and incited discord as well as acted with bias. Nazim resigned as the Deputy Speaker on 31 May and denied the allegations. Additionally, Nazim had been suspended as the PNC's Dhiggaru constituency president.

== Conviction on bribery charges ==
Ahmed Nazim was sentenced to 25 years by Supreme Court on corruption charges and stripped him of his seat in 2015. It was alleged that he was defrauding the state by submitting bids on behalf of non-existent companies to supply 15,000 national flags to the now-defunct atolls ministry. He was granted permission to leave the country for medical treatment in Singapore but fled and went to the United Kingdom and got political asylum. While he was in asylum, he filed a motion to review his sentence and was granted an injunction for the suspension of his sentence until the court completes the review. The Supreme Court later annulled the sentence against him.
