= 2013 Maldivian presidential election =

- 7 September 2013 (annulled first round); 9 November 2013 (first round re-run); 16 November 2013 (second round)
- Turnout: 87.20% (first round) ▲1.82pp 91.41% (second round) ▲4.83pp
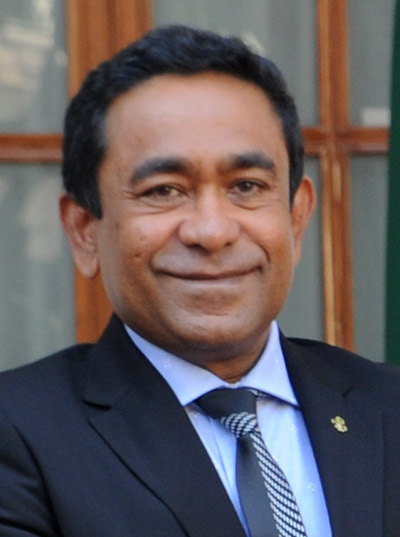

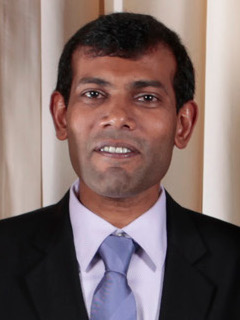
| Nominee | Abdulla Yameen | Mohamed Nasheed |
| Party | PPM | MDP |
| Running mate | Mohamed Jameel Ahmed | Mustafa Lutfi |
| Popular vote | 111,203 | 105,181 |
| Percentage | 51.39% | 48.61% |
- Second round results by atoll
President before election
Mohamed Waheed Hassan
Itthihaad
Elected President
Abdulla Yameen
PPM

Presidential elections were held in the Maldives on 7, 9 and 16 November 2013. The first round was held on 7 September. As no candidate received a majority, a second round was planned to be held in 28 September between the candidates who received the most votes in the first round, former President Mohamed Nasheed (who was contesting in the election following his controversial resignation, which he and many claimed was a coup d'état amidst the 2011–12 Maldives political crisis) and Abdulla Yameen, paternal half-brother of former president Maumoon Abdul Gayoom. Incumbent President Mohamed Waheed Hassan was eliminated in the first round after receiving fewer votes than three other candidates.

However, on 27 September the Supreme Court cancelled the run-off and annulled the first round results. A re-run of the first round was held on 9 November, with a similar result to the annulled vote. A run-off was planned for the following day due to the need to have a new president in place by 11 November. However, it was then postponed until 16 November by the Supreme Court after Yameen claimed he needed more time to campaign. Yameen went on to win the run-off with his share of the vote rising from 30% in the first round to 51% in the second round, whilst Nasheed's share increased by only 2%.

== Background ==
=== 2011–12 political crisis ===
Political friction in the country escalated in December 2011, when an opposition alliance 'Madhanee Ithihaad' was formed, which included the parties that supported the President Mohamed Nasheed in his 2008 presidential race. On 23 December, the capital city was rocked by protests by the opposition against the President Mohamed Nasheed. Further events transpired leading to the arrest of Chief Justice Abdulla Mohamed from his house by the military. This arrest sparked violent protests near the Republic Square. After the government refused to disclose any information to the public, the protests started gaining momentum. Demands went up for an independent investigation into the Judge and to arrest him according to the constitution and for the president to stop using executive power over another institution. The protest extended for over 22 days in the Republic Square and on 6 February 2012, the Maldives Police Service declined to use force to control or disperse the protests and joined the protest for the release of Judge Abdulla Mohamed. President Nasheed resigned the following day.

On 8 February 2012, the Maldivian Democratic Party announced for all its members across the country to go into streets in protests. President Mohamed Nasheed led the protests to Republic Square, announcing that he was forced to resign at gunpoint, and that the event was a coup d'état orchestrated by Vice-President Mohamed Waheed Hassan, who was sworn in as the new president of Maldives on the same day in accordance with the law of the Maldives.

After Nasheed and his supporters continued to protest Waheed's removal from office, he agreed to call a snap election. In April 2012, Waheed set the election for July 2013, stating that no earlier election was constitutionally possible. However Nasheed, strongly opposed this idea instead arguing for a 2012 election to settle the disputed presidency. This date was later then pushed down to September 2013, to when the next presidential election would constitutionally be taking place.

== Electoral system ==
The Maldives has Presidential system of government where the president is both head of state and government. Once in office, they could be re-elected to a second 5-year term, which is the limit allowed by the Constitution.

In the Maldives, the president is elected by a majority or more than fifty (50%) percent of the votes cast. When a candidate does not receive a majority of the votes, the election then proceeds to a runoff (or second round), which are mandated to be held no less than 21 days following the election. In a runoff round, the candidates among the two who receives fifty (50%) percent of the valid votes cast, are elected to the office of the president.

The official results of the voting are announced by the Elections Commission and published in the government gazette within seven days of the voting day of the presidential elections.

== Candidates ==
Incumbent President Mohammed Waheed ran as an independent candidate but backed by the Gaumee Itthihaad (National Unity Party) and the Dhivehi Rayyithunge Party. Former President Mohamed Nasheed was the Maldivian Democratic Party's candidate. Qasim Ibrahim is the candidate of the Jumhooree Party (JP) and is supported by the Adhaalath Party (AP) and the Dhivehi Qaumee Party.

Leader of the Progressive Party of Maldives (PPM), former president Maumoon Abdul Gayyoom, declared that he would not participate in any further election on 25 February. PPM held its presidential primary election on 30 March. The candidacy was won by the party's parliamentary group leader, and half-brother of Gayyoom, Abdulla Yameen with 63% of the vote, beating rival candidate Umar Naseer. A total of 31,298 PPM members were eligible to vote in the party's presidential primary through one of the 167 ballot boxes placed in 140 islands. In August, new political party Maldives Development Alliance (MDA) signed a coalition agreement with PPM to provide support in the presidential election.

== Results ==
Following the original first round on 7 September, the Supreme Court annulled the elections and cancelled the planned second round by a vote of four to three. Voting in favour of the annulment, Judge Ahmed Abdulla Didi referenced a confidential police report that claimed that 5,623 ineligible people had voted in the elections including dead people and others under 18. The rechecking of voters' registry was carried out in the presence of the staff of Elections Commission and the Police Service.

=== Results by Atoll ===
Results by atoll and geographical area (2013 presidential election, second round)
| Atoll / area | Mohamed Nasheed (MDP) | | Abdulla Yameen (PPM) | | Total valid votes |
| Atoll / area | Votes | % | Votes | % | Total valid votes |
|---|---|---|---|---|---|
| HA | 5,687 | 48.50% | 6,038 | 51.50% | 11,725 |
| HDh | 5,511 | 42.09% | 7,583 | 57.91% | 13,094 |
| Sh | 4,080 | 44.46% | 5,096 | 55.54% | 9,176 |
| N | 4,244 | 47.65% | 4,662 | 52.35% | 8,906 |
| R | 5,046 | 41.62% | 7,077 | 58.38% | 12,123 |
| B | 4,280 | 51.06% | 4,102 | 48.94% | 8,382 |
| Lh | 3,816 | 51.37% | 3,612 | 48.63% | 7,428 |
| K | 3,532 | 40.88% | 5,107 | 59.12% | 8,639 |
| AA | 2,464 | 53.26% | 2,162 | 46.74% | 4,626 |
| ADh | 2,534 | 37.82% | 4,166 | 62.18% | 6,700 |
| V | 743 | 49.40% | 761 | 50.60% | 1,504 |
| M | 1,857 | 42.78% | 2,484 | 57.22% | 4,341 |
| F | 1,463 | 45.53% | 1,750 | 54.47% | 3,213 |
| Dh | 2,208 | 46.01% | 2,591 | 53.99% | 4,799 |
| Th | 4,352 | 48.87% | 4,553 | 51.13% | 8,905 |
| L | 4,174 | 42.73% | 5,595 | 57.27% | 9,769 |
| GA | 3,657 | 47.48% | 4,045 | 52.52% | 7,702 |
| GDh | 5,550 | 51.48% | 5,231 | 48.52% | 10,781 |
| Gn | 2,904 | 47.13% | 3,258 | 52.87% | 6,162 |
| S | 9,704 | 56.00% | 7,625 | 44.00% | 17,329 |
| Malé City | 16,631 | 52.48% | 15,061 | 47.52% | 31,692 |
| Atoll boxes (Hulhumalé and Villimalé) | 2,576 | 47.08% | 2,895 | 52.92% | 5,471 |
| Overseas | 3,073 | 57.59% | 2,263 | 42.41% | 5,336 |
| Industrial areas | 408 | 48.69% | 430 | 51.31% | 838 |
| Jails | 1,054 | 65.59% | 553 | 34.41% | 1,607 |
| Resorts | 3,633 | 59.21% | 2,503 | 40.79% | 6,136 |
| National total | 105,181 | 48.61% | 111,203 | 51.39% | 216,384 |

| Candidate | Running mate | Party | Votes | % |
|---|---|---|---|---|
| Mohamed Nasheed | Mustafa Lutfi | Maldivian Democratic Party | 95,224 | 45.45 |
| Abdulla Yameen | Mohamed Jameel Ahmed | Progressive Party of Maldives | 53,099 | 25.35 |
| Qasim Ibrahim | Hassan Saeed | Jumhooree Party | 50,422 | 24.07 |
| Mohamed Waheed Hassan | Ahmed Thasmeen Ali | Independent | 10,750 | 5.13 |
| Total | | | 209,495 | 100.00 |
| Valid votes | | | 209,495 | 98.87 |
| Invalid/blank votes | | | 2,395 | 1.13 |
| Total votes | | | 211,890 | 100.00 |
| Registered voters/turnout | | | 239,593 | 88.44 |
Source: Election Commission

=== Re-run ===
| Candidate | Running mate | Party | First round | | Second round | |
| Candidate | Running mate | Party | Votes | % | Votes | % |
|---|---|---|---|---|---|---|
| Mohamed Nasheed | Mustafa Lutfi | Maldivian Democratic Party | 96,764 | 46.93 | 105,181 | 48.61 |
| Abdulla Yameen | Mohamed Jameel Ahmed | Progressive Party of Maldives | 61,278 | 29.72 | 111,203 | 51.39 |
| Qasim Ibrahim | Hassan Saeed | Jumhooree Party | 48,131 | 23.34 | | |
| Total | | | 206,173 | 100.00 | 216,384 | 100.00 |
| Valid votes | | | 206,173 | 98.88 | 216,384 | 98.98 |
| Invalid/blank votes | | | 2,331 | 1.12 | 2,237 | 1.02 |
| Total votes | | | 208,504 | 100.00 | 218,621 | 100.00 |
| Registered voters/turnout | | | 239,105 | 87.20 | 239,165 | 91.41 |
Source: Election Commission
