= Ahmed Shafeeq Ibrahim Moosa =

Maldivian politician (born 1968)

Ahmed Moosa

Envoy for Science and Technology of the Maldives
- In office 11 March 2009 – 9 February 2012
- President: Mohamed Nasheed
- Vice President: Mohammed Waheed Hassan

Personal details
- Born: Ahmed Shafeeq Ibrahim Moosa; 4 November 1968 (age 57) Malé, Maldives
- Party: Maldivian Democratic Party
- Children: 6
- Education: University of Glasgow (1995; BEng)
- Occupation: Editor-in-chief

Ahmed Shafeeq Ibrahim Moosa (Dhivehi: އަހްމަދު ޝަފީގް އިބްރާހިމް މޫސާ; born 4 November 1968), also known as Sappé, is a Maldivian editor-in-chief and politician who served as the first Envoy for Science and Technology to be appointed by the first democratically elected president of the Maldives, Mohamed Nasheed. He was appointed to his position on 11 March 2009 and resigned from the Maldivian government on 9 February 2012, soon after President Nasheed's government was allegedly overthrown by President Mohammed Waheed Hassan two days earlier. Moosa is among those who campaigned for democracy and human rights which led to the end of the 30-year rule of Gayoom in November 2008. He is the founder and editor-in-chief of the news website Dhivehi Observer.

Moosa is a senior member of the Maldivian Democratic Party and was elected to its first General Council. He was a widely outspoken critic of the former president Maumoon Abdul Gayoom. He lived in self-proclaimed exile in the United Kingdom with his family from 2003 to 2008. The opposition Coalition won the Presidential Election held in October 2008.

Moosa resides in Glasgow, United Kingdom as of 2009.

== Early and personal life ==
Moosa was born in Malé, Maldives. He first married in 1995 and had three sons from that marriage: Adam, Michael and Daniel. He married secondly Fathimath Moosa, with whom he had a son and a daughter, Alexander and Enya. He later married Aminath Moosa and had a daughter, Emma.

Before his political career began, Moosa filled several government and private company posts. He also managed and ran his own businesses. In March 1999 he founded A Company Pvt Ltd. The company was mainly involved in consultancy work in engineering, web design, printing and publishing, composition of business and marketing proposals and reports.

Moosa was practically involved in designing and production of the election campaign material for Ilyas Ibrahim (brother-in-law of the president Gayoom) in 1999 who ran against Mohamed Nasheed (of the opposition) for representing the people of Malé as a member of the parliament. "I worked in Ilyas's last campaign (1999) on the request of Mr. Qasim Ibrahim which later turned out to be a regrettable experience."

Since 1999 Moosa has been a consultant to Qasim Ibrahim, Chairman of Villa Shipping and Trading Company, the largest private company in the Maldives. He is the leader of the Jumhooree Party, which is part of the current government coalition.

== Education ==
Moosa completed his secondary education at the Malé English School, Malé. In 1990 he acquired General Certificate of Education with distinction in all subjects, from Asmai Secondary School, Kuwait. On 13 July 1995 he graduated from University of Glasgow with a BEng with honours in mechanical engineering. Two years later, in 1997, he graduated at University of Birmingham acquiring PhD (Engineering) in metallurgy and materials.

== Political career ==
On 19 September 2003, Evan Naseem who was serving at Maafushi jail was severely beaten up and ultimately paid with his life, the result of a series of complicated disputes between inmates. News broke out the following day and there was a civil unrest in the capital city of the Maldives, Malé. The BBC covered this event and Moosa gave an interview to the BBC the following month and left Maldives, on 15 October 2003, to the United Kingdom. The interview was aired on 17 October 2003. He says he left the country because he believed he would be in danger if he remained in Maldives. "I have already left the country fearing the worst" said Sappé in a written statement published on his website.

He joined the Maldivian Democratic Party on 10 November 2003, soon after its official announcement and was a member of its general council. However, he does not get involved with day-to-day operations of the party for two reasons. That is, MDP's major operations are carried out in Sri Lanka and he operates his own website Dhivehi Observer, which is his major line of connection with the Maldivian public.

After his initial interview with the BBC, he gave several other interviews. They appeared to have exerted pressure on Maldivian government.

According to the article published on The Daily Telegraph on 15 September 2006, Ahmed Moosa was threatened via email by the wife of police commissioner Adam Zahir, Husna Latheef, on 11 April 2005. Moosa filed a complaint to Wiltshire Police who investigated the death threat with the assistance of the Metropolitan Police in London. The threat was traced back to Husna Latheef's email and was issued with a first verbal warning under the Harassment Act.
