= Ahmed Saleem =

Ahmed Saleem may refer to:

- Ahmed Saleem (diplomat), Maldivian ambassador-at-large
- Ahmed Saleem (Eydhafushi politician), Maldivian deputy speaker from 2026, known as Redwave Saleem
- Ahmed Saleem (Hoarafushi politician), Maldivian deputy speaker from 2023 to 2024

== See also ==
- Ahmed Salim (disambiguation)
