= Villa Air =

Maldivian airline

IATA	ICAO	Call sign
VP	VQI	VILLA AIR
- Founded: 14 March 2011; 15 years ago
- Commenced operations: 1 October 2011; 15 years ago
- Operating bases: Velana International Airport
- Hubs: Villa International Airport Maamigili
- Subsidiaries: Flyme SeePlane
- Fleet size: 4
- Destinations: 3
- Parent company: Villa Group
- Headquarters: Villa House, Malé, Maldives
- Website: villaair.aero

Villa Air is a Maldivian airline. It flies to only one destination, Maamigili, using four turboprop aircraft. Their headquarters are in the Villa House in Malé. The airline is a subsidiary of Villa Group, and began operations on 1 October 2011. The company slogan is We fly you in style.

== Destinations ==
On 4 September 2020, the airline operated its first international charter flight from Velana International Airport to Bandaranaike International Airport carrying 72 passengers on an ATR 72-600 aircraft.

Villa Air's destinations as of January 2025 include the following airports:

Domestic destinations
Country	City	Airport	Notes	Ref
Maldives	Malé	Velana International Airport	Base	
Maldives	Maamigili	Villa International Airport Maamigili	Hub	
Maldives	Dharavandhoo	Dharavandhoo Airport	Resuming soon	

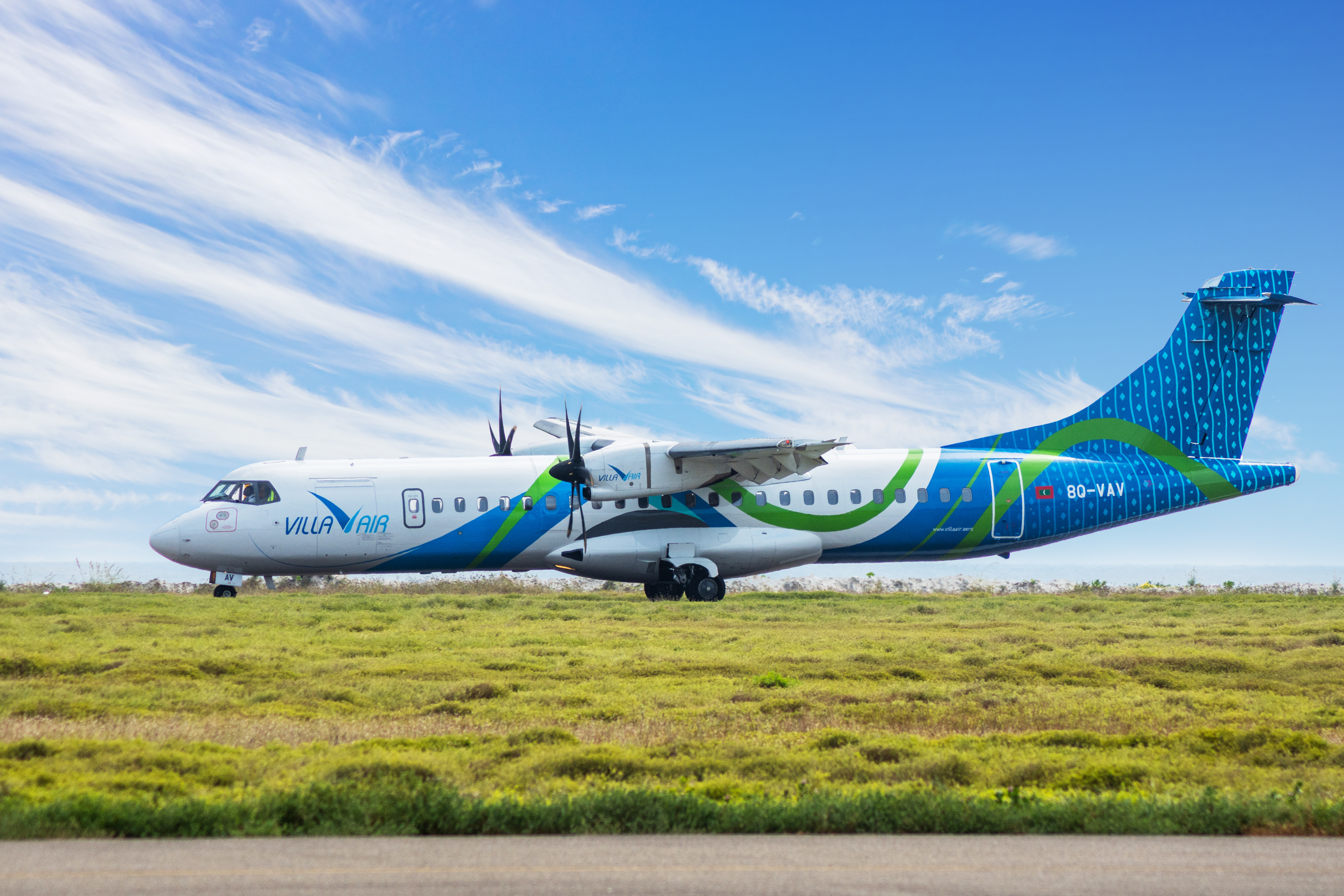
A Villa Air ATR 72-500 painted in the new 2024 livery registered as 8Q-VAV

== Fleet ==
=== Current fleet ===
As of July 2026, Villa Air operates the following aircraft:

Villa Air current fleet
Aircraft	In service	Order	Passengers		Notes
Aircraft	In service	Order	Y	Total	Notes
ATR 72-500	1	—	68	68	—
ATR 72-600	1	—	74	74	—
De Havilland Canada DHC-6 Twin Otter	2	—			—

=== Former fleet ===
As of August 2025, Villa Air operated 1 ATR 72-500 and 1 ATR 72-600.

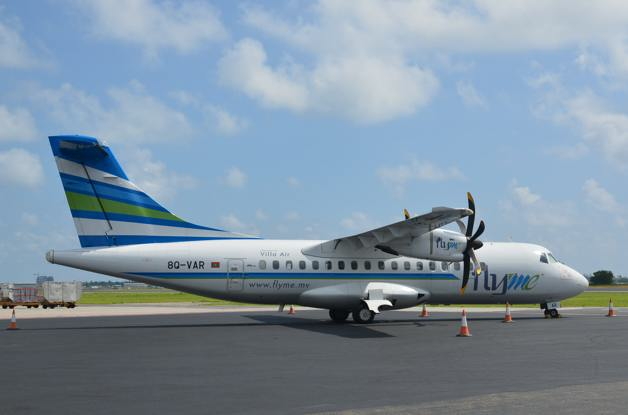
Retired ATR 42-500 of Flyme

Villa Air retired fleet
Aircraft	Fleet	Introduced	Retired	Replacement aircraft	Remark
ATR 42-500	3	2011	2023	—	—
ATR 72-500	1	2015	2023	—	—
ATR 72-600	2	2013	2015	—	—
Cessna 208 Caravan Amphibian	1	2014	2018	De Havilland Canada Dash 6-300	Amphibious Type

== Logo and livery ==
Previous Flyme logo before rebranding

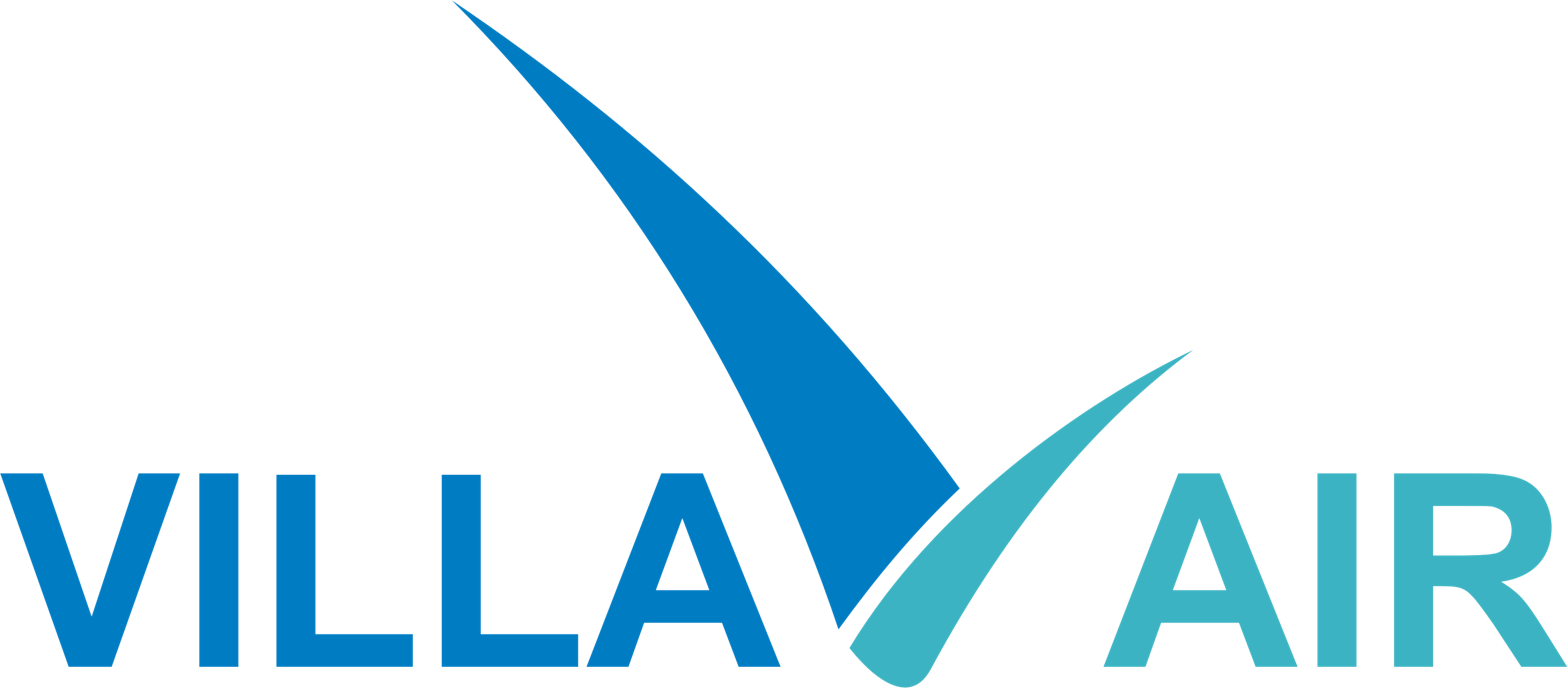
The airline's new logo

Before Flyme rebranded to Villa Air, their livery had blue, light blue, green and white stripes on the tail and wing, and a line in the fuselage of the aircraft. In 2023, Flyme was rebranded to Villa Air. The new logo has the same colours from the previous livery but the tail and wing now has blue, and the tailplane now has a light blue diamond pattern and carved green. The fuselage now has blue, light blue, green and an additional grey. The new livery also has the new Villa Air logo. Only one ATR 72-500, registered 8Q-VAV, currently has this new livery.
