= Muraidhooge =

Official Residence of the Speaker of the People's Majlis

- މުރައިދޫގެ

General information
- Type: Official residence
- Location: Haveeree Hingun, Malé 20216, Malé, Maldives
- Coordinates: 4.179213°N 73.508044°E
- Current tenants: Abdul Raheem Abdulla
- Owner: Government of the Maldives

Muraidhooge (Dhivehi: މުރައިދޫގެ) is the official residence of the Speaker of the People's Majlis.

== History ==
After the Attempted assassination of Mohamed Nasheed, Muraidhooge was established as the Official Residence of the Speaker of the Parliament. It started as a temporary residence which later became the Official Residence.

== Tenants ==
Tenant	Chief of Staff	Ref
Mohamed Nasheed (2021–2023)	Unknown	
Abdul Raheem Abdulla (2024–present)	Adam Haleem	
