= Dhivehi Qaumee Party =

Political party in the Maldives from 2008 to 2013

Dhivehi Qaumee Party ދިވެހި ޤައުމީ ޕާޓީ
- Abbreviation: DQP
- Leader: Hassan Saeed
- Founder: Hassan Saeed
- Founded: 5 September 2008
- Dissolved: 2013
- Religion: Sunni Islam
- Colors: Maroon

The Dhivehi Qaumee Party (Dhivehi: ދިވެހި ޤައުމީ ޕާޓީ) was a political party in the Maldives. It was registered with the Election Commission on 5 September 2008 and was dissolved in 2013.

The party's 2008 presidential candidate was Dr. Hassan Saeed and his running mate was Dr. Ahmed Shaheed. Dr. Hassan was the former Attorney General during Maumoon Abdul Gayoom's term. Shaheed was Foreign Minister during Maumoon's term and was also Foreign Minister in Nasheed's cabinet.

In 2012, the party released a pamphlet criticising Mohamed Nasheed's government and accused him of undermining the religion of the Maldives and introducing other religions.

In 2013, the party joined a coalition of the Gaumee Itthihaad party and the Adhaalath Party, but later on it quit the coalition after accusing then-President Mohamed Waheed of not working with coalition partners. Later on, the party became coalition partners with the Jumhooree Party and Hassan Saeed ran as the running mate of Qasim Ibrahim in the 2013 Maldivian presidential election.
