= Villa College =

Private college in Maldives

- Motto: Transform your life (Note: The phrase "Transform your life" is always used in TV advertisements, which is theoretically a motto)
- Type: Private
- Established: 28 January 2007; 19 years ago
- Founder: Qasim Ibrahim (Note: Qasim Ibrahim has later become the chairman of Villa College)
- Chancellor: Dr. Ahmed Anwar (Note: Ahmed Anwar is also the rector of Villa College)
- Students: 3500+
- Location: Male', Kaafu Atoll, Maldives; 4.1695601°N 73.50907129999996°E
- Campus: QI Campus (Note: Institutional campuses are located in 9 different islands, the latest campus was opened in Hithadhoo, an island district of Addu City)
- Vice Rector: Dr. Ali Najeeb
- Parent: Villa Group
- Colours: Blue, white
- Website: villacollege.edu.mv

Villa College is a tertiary education and training institute established by the chairman of Villa Group, Hon. Qasim Ibrahim to offer educational opportunities to Maldivians at an affordable price. With the aim, Villa College began its historic journey on 28 January 2007, with the registration of its first institute, Villa Institute of Water Sports followed by the Villa Institute of Information Technology (VIIT) and Villa Institute of Hospitality and Tourism Studies. In 2016 Villa College started to conduct business and management programs in affiliation with University of the West of England.

== History ==
Villa College commenced its first program early October 2007 with a total number of twenty students. Since then, the student numbers have grown steadily and today over three thousand students, learning various disciplines, are enrolled. Although Villa College started its operations in October 2007 under the Faculty of Computing and Business Management, all academic courses began in July 2008.

== Global Rankings ==
Villa College has recently achieved significant milestones in both the Quacquarelli Symonds (QS) and Times Higher Education (THE) ranking systems, distinguishing itself as a pioneering institution in the Maldives for international higher education benchmarking.

=== QS (Quacquarelli Symonds) Rankings ===
- QS Stars Rating: Villa College is the first and only institution in the Maldives to receive a QS Stars rating. It was awarded an overall four-star rating, while achieving the maximum 5-Star rating in three specific categories: Online Learning, Employability, and Environmental Impact.
- QS Online MBA Rankings 2026: Making history as the first Maldivian institution to appear in QS global subject rankings, Villa College's Online MBA program ranked within the top 150 globally. Notably, the college ranked #1 in the world for "Class Experience" and placed 12th in the Asia-Pacific region for both "Faculty and Teaching" and "Employability."

=== THE (Times Higher Education) Rankings ===
- THE Impact Rankings 2025: Villa College became the first Maldivian educational institution to be featured in the THE Impact Rankings, which assess universities against the United Nations’ Sustainable Development Goals (SDGs).
- Global Placement: It secured a spot in the 401–600 band globally (placing it in the top 20–25% of academic institutions worldwide for sustainable impact).
- Specific SDG Achievements: The college performed exceptionally well in several categories, ranking in the top 200 globally for SDG 4 (Quality Education), and the top 300 for SDG 5 (Gender Equality), SDG 16 (Peace, Justice, and Strong Institutions), and SDG 17 (Partnerships for the Goals).

== Campuses ==
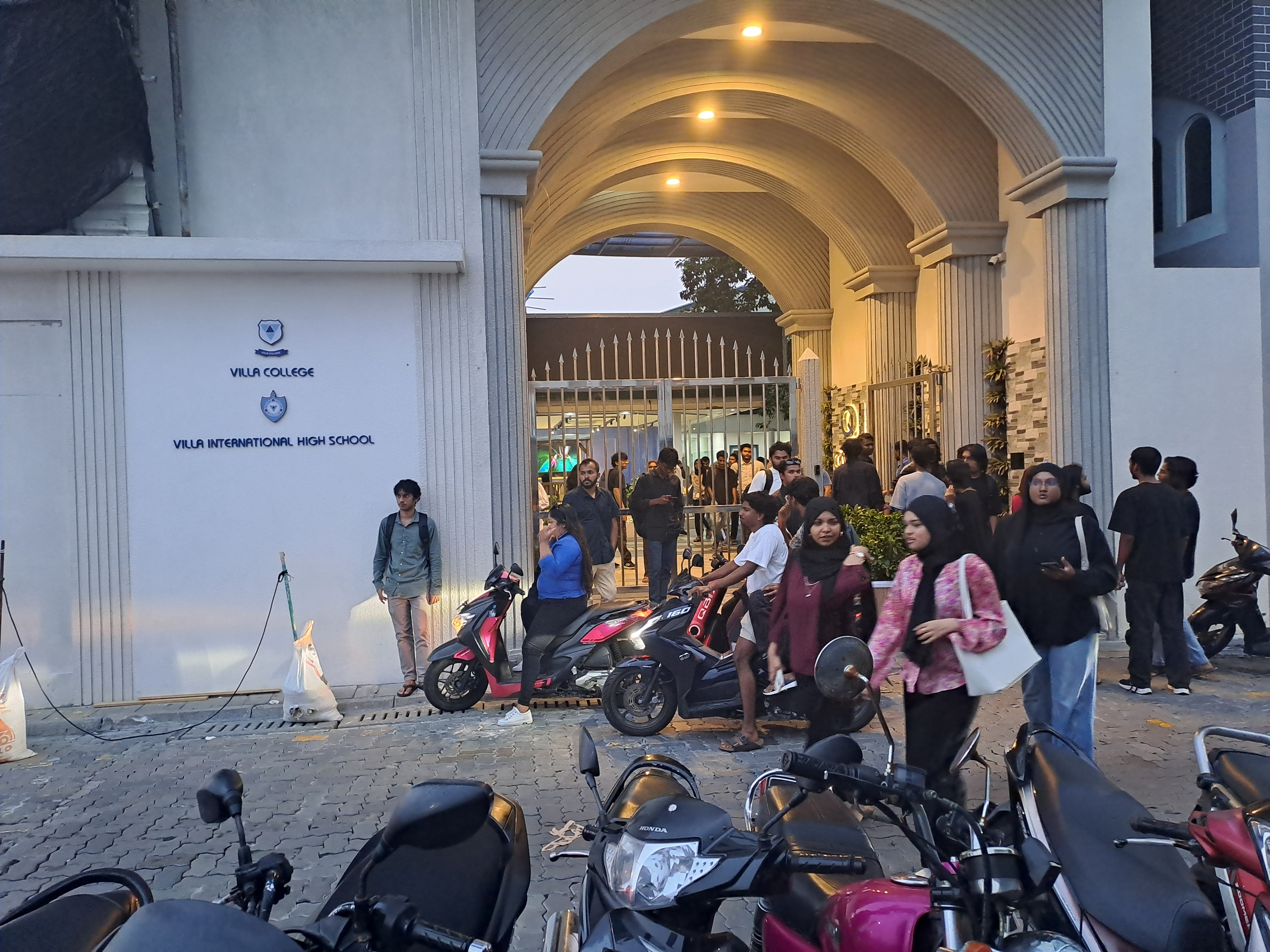
Main gate of Villa College's main campus, QI Campus

Villa College currently consist of six campuses; QI campus, Green Campus, Knowledge Village Fuvahmulah Campus, Lakeside Campus & Eydhafushi Campus.

=== QI Campus ===
Villa College Qasim Ibrahim (QI) campus is the central operation of Villa College. It is located at the heart of Male’ City in Central Business District surrounded by several government and private offices and amenities.

The QI campus is designed to be environmentally friendly with a huge rose garden, an alley of orchids and neatly trimmed grass all across the horizon.

All the central administration, faculties and teaching are carried out in QI campus.

=== Fuvahmulah campus ===
Villa College Fuvahmulaku Campus is located in Gn. Fuvahmulaku. This campus runs Villa College courses from Certificate level to master's degree level. The campus has fully air conditioned classrooms with state of art multimedia facilities. A modern computer lab is as well available for students.

=== Lakeside Campus ===
Villa College Lakeside Campus (VCLC) is located in Shaviyani Funadhoo at a very picturesque location. The campus is surrounded by a beautiful lake with several domesticated animals across the lake. The campus offers certificate level and degree foundation programs and is expected to offer degree programs from 2014 onwards. State of art modern class rooms and facilities are available for the students studying in VCLC

=== Eydhafushi Campus ===
Villa College Eydhafushi Campus (VCEC) is located in Baa Eydhafushi delivering certificate levels to degree level courses. In 2015 VCEC will commence delivering master's degree programs. The campus is located in the historic Bahiyya land and also operates Bahiyya pre-school as part of Villa College.

=== Other campuses ===
| Name | Opened date | Campus Manager | Notes |
|---|---|---|---|
| Naifaru Campus | 13 May 2013 | Nasrulla Mohamed | (Note: Naifaru Campus is the first institutional campus of Villa College to be opened) |
| Mahibadhoo Campus | 14 April 2014 | Ahmed Rifath | |
| Kulhudhuffushi Campus | 2017 | Mohamed Abdulla | (Note: Kulhudhuffushi Campus is the most northern located campus of Villa College, at the Upper North Province of Maldives) |
| Laam Gan Campus | 10 June 2019 | Thoha Abubakuru | |
| Hithadhoo Campus | 16 December 2024 | Shafna Ahmed Didi | (Note: Hithadhoo Campus is the most southern located campus of Villa College (at the South Province of Maldives), & formerly known as a learning center in September 2015) |

== Faculties and institutes ==
Teaching and learning at Villa College are organized and coordinated by many faculties, institutes, and centres.

Faculties
Faculty of Business Management (FBM)
Faculty of Educational Studies (FES)
Faculty of Hospitality Management and Tourism Studies (FHMTS)
Faculty of Information Communications Technology (FICT)
Faculty of Shariah and Law
Faculty of Marine Studies
Institutes
Institute for Academic Development
Institute for Corporate Directors & Secretaries
Institute for Research & Innovation
Centres
Centre for English Language Support (CELS)
Centre for Professional Studies (CPS)
School of Health Sciences (SHS)
Centre for Information Communications Technology
Centre for Foundation Studies (CFS)
Centre for Professional Studies (CPS)
