= Abdulla Maseeh Mohamed =

Speaker of the People's Majlis from 2014 to 2018

- ޢަބްދުﷲ މަސީޙު މުޙަންމަދު
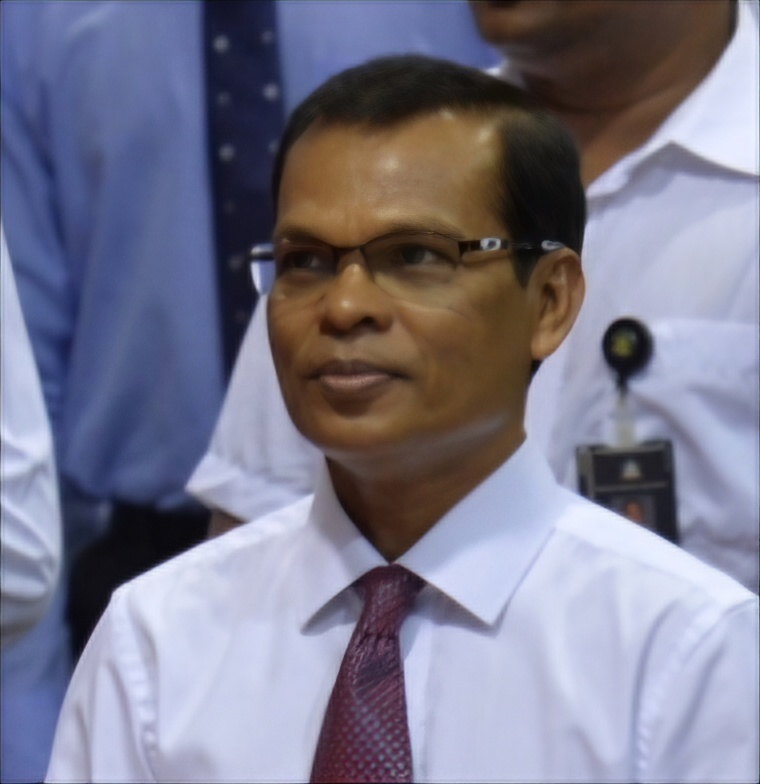
- Mohamed in 2016

17th Speaker of the People's Majlis
- In office 28 May 2014 – 1 November 2018
- President: Abdulla Yameen
- Preceded by: Abdulla Shahid
- Succeeded by: Qasim Ibrahim

Member of the People's Majlis
- In office 2000–2019
- President: Maumoon Abdul Gayoom; Mohamed Nasheed; Mohamed Waheed Hassan; Abdulla Yameen; Ibrahim Mohamed Solih
- Speaker: Abdulla Hameed; Ahmed Zahir; Mohamed Shihab; Abdulla Shahid; Himself; Qasim Ibrahim
- Succeeded by: Mohamed Mumthaz
- Constituency: South Fuvahmulah

Personal details
- Born: 4 February 1962 (age 64) Fuvahmulah, Sultanate of the Maldive Islands
- Other political affiliations: Progressive Party of Maldives; Dhivehi Rayyithunge Party
- Education: Monash University; University of Plymouth

Abdulla Maseeh Mohamed (Dhivehi: ޢަބްދުﷲ މަސީޙް މުޙައްމަދު; born 4 February 1962) is a Maldivian politician who served as the Speaker of the People's Majlis. He was elected Speaker on 28 May 2014 to 1 November 2018.

Maseeh contributed significantly to the democratic transition that has taken place in the Maldives in the last two decades, particularly as a member of the Special Majlis.

== Early life and education ==
Maseeh was born in the island of Fuvahmulah to a prominent figure and a former Island Chief Mohamed Najeeb and Aminath Didi. Abdulla Maseeh Mohamed holds an MA in International Relations from Monash University, Australia, and a B.Sc. (Hons.) in Politics from the University of Plymouth, UK.

== Government career (1982–2008) ==
Maseeh began his government career at the Ministry of Foreign Affairs in 1982 and has been in the Public Service ever since. He quickly rose to the middle management level amid fierce competition, gaining the confidence and trust of his superiors. He is recognised as a formidable negotiator, campaigner and team builder. He was transferred to the President’s Office in 2001 and was subsequently appointed Deputy Minister at the President’s Office. He left Government service in 2008 solely to concentrate on his work as a parliamentarian.

== Member of Parliament (2000–2019) ==
Maseeh was first elected to the Parliament in 2000 to represent his own island constituency of Fuahmulah in the Gnaviyani Atoll and, five years later, retained the seat for a consecutive second term. In the first multiparty parliamentary elections in 2009, he secured the seat for South Constituency of Fuvahmulah and won it again in 2014.

Maseeh served from July 2004 to August 2008 in the Special Majlis that was mandated with the drafting of the 2008 Constitution for the Maldives. Maseeh is a member of the Progressive Party of the Maldives

Maseeh Mohamed was elected the Speaker of the 18th People’s Majlis on 28 May 2014 to 1 November 2019.

== Chair of the Social Affairs Committee in the Parliament (2007–2014) ==
As Chair of the Social Affairs Committee for straight eight years, he gained wide recognition within the parliamentary circles when he worked with other MPs towards consensus building in divisive issues. He also developed a reputation for constructive engagement by seeking the involvement of key stakeholders on issues related to national development, human rights and public policy.

== Speaker of Parliament (2014–2019) ==
Maseeh represented the Maldives at various international conferences, meetings and seminars, apart from participating in a number of bilateral visits aimed at protecting and advancing the interests of the Maldives.

== Personal life ==
He is married and has a son.
