= Ali Solih =

Maldivian politician

Minister of State for Environment, Climate Change and Technology
- In office 2022–2023

Personal details
- Political party: Jumhooree Party

Ali Solih is a Maldivian politician from the Jumhooree Party currently serving as Minister of State for Environment, Climate Change and Technology in the Cabinet of the Maldives.

== Personal life ==
On 22 August 2022, he was stabbed in the street, sustaining injuries to his arm.
