= Villa International Airport Maamigili =

Villa International Airport Maamigili ވިލާ ބައިނަލްއަޤުވާމީ ވައިގެބަނދަރު
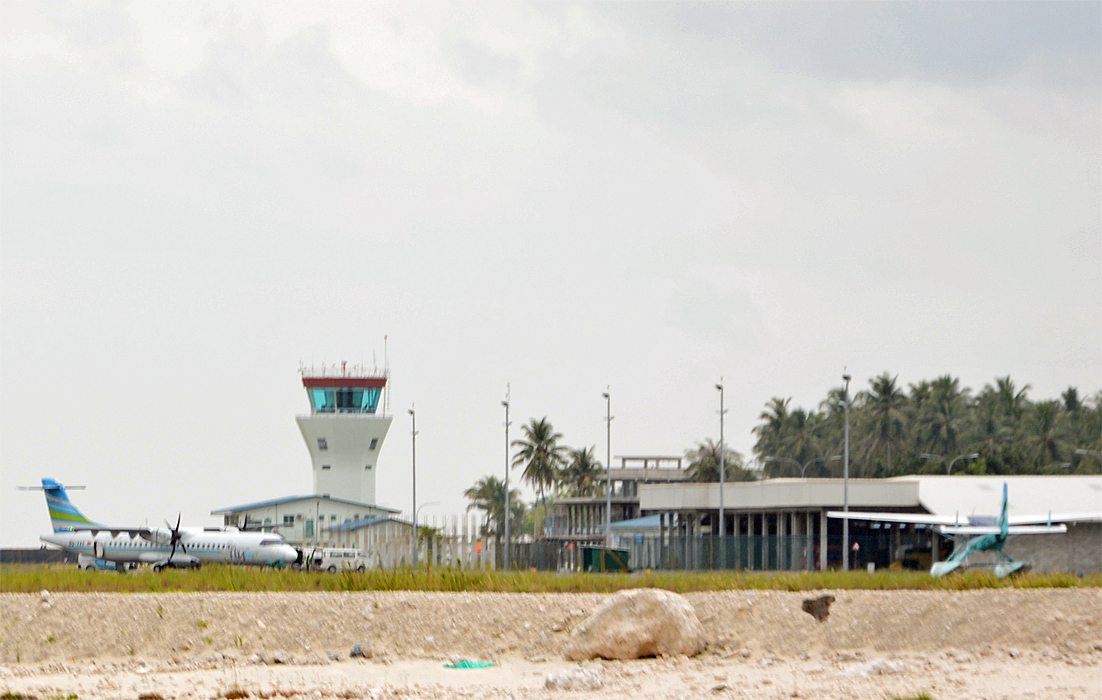
- IATA: VAM; ICAO: VRMV

Summary
- Airport type: Public
- Owner/Operator: Villa Group
- Serves: Maamigili, Alif Dhaal Atoll, Maldives
- Hub for: Flyme
- Elevation AMSL: 7 ft / 2 m
- Coordinates: 03°28′14″N 072°50′09″E

Map
- Location in Maldives

Runways
Direction	Length		Surface
Direction	m	ft	Surface
09/27	1,800	5,905	Asphalt

Villa International Airport Maamigili (IATA: VAM, ICAO: VRMV), also known as Villa-Maamigili Airport, is an airport in the Maldives. It is located on the island of Maamigili in Alif Dhaal Atoll.

The airport was developed by Maldivian business tycoon Qasim Ibrahim, who grew up in Maamigili, as a project to develop the infrastructure and facilities of the island. He has started a project to build new runways so planes from abroad visiting his resorts will be able to land directly on this airport, instead of having to stop off at Malé airport. It was developed and operated by his company, Villa Group, on land leased from the government. The airport opened up direct transportation facilities to two of their flagship resorts located on adjacent islands.

The opening of the airport coincided with Villa's entry into the aviation industry, the founding of a new airline Villa Air (operating as Flyme), to operate from the airport.

The airport opened on 1 October 2011 as a domestic airport. In 2013, it was upgraded to international airport standards.

Villa Airport was downgraded to domestic status by the government in August 2014 because of security concerns, but was reinstated as an international airport 23 days later.

In January 2015, Flyme started seaplane operations out of Villa Airport.

== Facilities ==
The airport resides at an elevation of 6 feet (2 m) above mean sea level. It has one runway designated 09/27 with a concrete surface measuring 1,800 by 30 metres (5,906 ft × 98 ft).
