= VTV (Maldives) =

Maldivian television channel

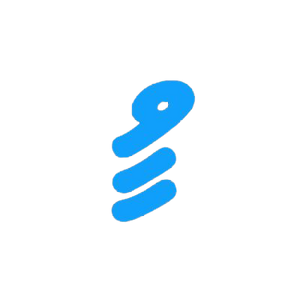
- Logo since 2019
- Country: Maldives
- Broadcast area: Maldives, South Asia
- Stations: H. Sun Ray, Sosun Magu,
- Headquarters: Malé, Maldives

Ownership
- Owner: Island Broadcasting Company (renamed as VMEDIA)

History
- Launched: 5 September 2008
- Founder: Qasim Ibrahim

Links
- Website: www.vnews.mv

Availability

Terrestrial
- Medianet: 101
- SSNET: 8

VTV (stylised as ވީ, romanisation: Vī) is the second private TV channel of the Maldives. It was inaugurated in 2008. The channel is run under the umbrella of V Media Group which include VFM, Veekly and VNews. It was founded by famous businessman and politician of Maldives Hon. Qasim Ibrahim. It is one of the most watched channel in Maldives. VTV was one of the TV stations which introduced new features, such as an official app. VTV was the first Maldivian channel to show the FIFA World Cup in HD format. The channel was attacked many times during the revolution of Maldives in 2012. This channel's slogan is Aharenge TV ("My TV"). This channel brings many sports and political events to the local.

Shows of VTV include Fasmanzaru, Ameenge Malaafai, Nuvagadi, Kudakudhinge Bageechaa, V Kids, V select, Friday night with Hamysh, V Sports, VTV School singing competition, Kushuge Hafaraiy and many more.

== History ==
VTV is the first media outlet of IBC (now VMEDIA) and the second private TV channel to operate in the Maldives. It applied for a broadcasting license in August 2007 and started broadcasting on 5 September 2008, delivering a four-hour schedule from 8pm to midnight in an initial phase, with coverage nationwide on Medianet. Since its inception in 2008, VTV had been broadcasting via satellite to a global audience, covering the whole of Maldives and neighboring countries, reaching out to Europe and Middle East. The live video signal of VTV is streamed via internet and can be viewed from any part of the world. VTV broadcasts mainly in the local language, with update news and current affairs programs, sports and entertainment. VTV is one of the most watched private TV channels of Maldives. VTV has acquired broadcast rights of major sporting events like the FIFA World Cup of 2010 and 2014.

The channel carried UEFA Euro 2012 alongside Television Maldives, sublicensed from Medianet.

VTV has faced many attacks during the revolution of Maldives in 2012 including an arson attack which damaged the channel's operating building severely.

In May 2020, the station nearly faced a temporary suspension due to losses caused by the pandemic.

The channel cut off its live feed of the Dhivehi Premier League in October 2024 due to a lack of payments with the Football Association of Maldives.

== VFM ==
VFM, a radio station by VMEDIA, broadcasts its Radio programs on FM 99 MHz covering almost 80% of the country. With a terrestrial network established, VFM has the widest coverage among the private Radio networks. VFM is also broadcast via satellite, streamed via internet and telecast as visual radio during the off-peak hours of VTV. The channel covers news, sports, entertainment, and informative programs.

== Veekly ==
Veekly is the result of VMEDIA's effort to hold a key position in the field of publishing. Veekly is a weekly magazine printed and published in full color, targeted at the youth, covering a wide range of happenings across the nation. Veekly is the official in-flight magazine of FlyMe, the domestic carrier of Villa Air. Veekly is also regarded the only consistent weekly magazine published in the country.

== VNews ==
Vnews.mv is the main news source of VMEDIA. Published in the local language and in English, vnews.mv is a leading news website with a viewership of over 30,000 unique hits every day. News is updated minute by minute as it happens. Live blogging and many other features attract readers from across the globe. A VNews iPhone app is also available to download for free on the Apple App Store.

== Controversies ==
On 20 September 2008, channel CEO Thoyyib Mohammed resigned due to concerns that the station would be used for political propaganda.

A 27-year old man was arrested on the night of 5 May 2012 for his role in the vandalism on 19 March.

On 3 August 2018, it and Raajje TV cut off live coverage of the speeches of Mohamed Nasheed and Gasim Ibrahim.
