= Villa Group =

Maldivian business conglomerate

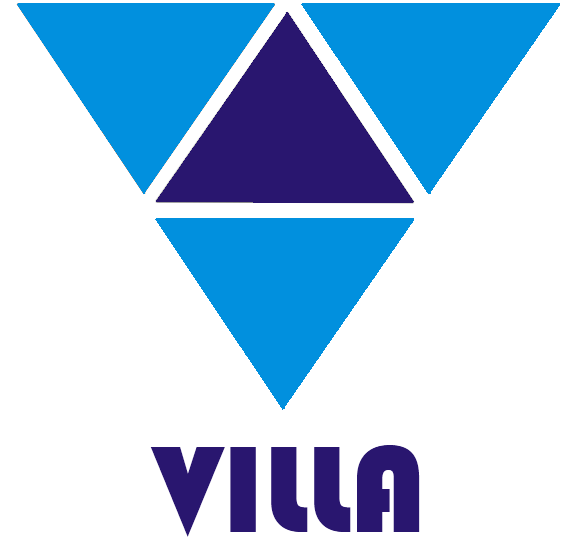
- Company type: Privately held company
- Industry: Conglomerate
- Founded: 1986
- Founder: Qasim Ibrahim
- Headquarters: Male', Maldives
- Area served: Maldives, Singapore, Germany, Hong Kong, Mexico, Tokyo (Japan)
- Key people: Qasim Ibrahim (Chairman)
- Revenue: ~Rf 1.5 billion (2018)
- Net income: ~Rf 252 million (2018)
- Number of employees: ~6000
- Subsidiaries: Villa Shipping and Trading; Villa Hotels; Villa Hakatha (Energy); Villa Cement; Villa Air; Villa Housing; Villa Travels and Tours; Villa Diving; Villa Food & Beverages; Villa Fishing; Villa Technologies; Villa TV; MediaNet (Cable Network); Villa College; Villa Touristik GMBH - Germany; Villa Shipping (Singapore); Villa Group Resorts; Horizon Fisheries; Fun Island; Villa Nautica Paradise Island; Villa Park Sun Island; Villa Haven; Royal Island; Paradise Holidays; Ways and Villas
- Website: www.villa.com.mv

The Villa Group is one of the largest business entities in the Maldives. The holding company Villa Shipping and Trading Company Pvt. Ltd. is a private conglomerate which is amongst the largest private business in the Maldives with major operations in Shipping, Import and Export, General Trade and Tourism, fishing, media, communication, transport and education related Businesses. Foundation of Villa Group can be traced back to 1986 when Qasim Ibrahim registered a Shipping and Trading company named 'Villa', the common trade name.

== History ==
In 1976 Qasim Ibrahim set up his own trading business and traded in commodities such as rice, tobacco, diesel and kerosene, which proved to be profitable, and the business experienced rapid growth. He later expanded his business with a small loan of USD 2,000 from State Bank of India (SBI), which is still his primary banker.

After four years, Qasim was able to purchase his first shipping vessel, an old fishing vessel converted to carry cargo and oil, to facilitate oil imports. By April 14, 1986, Qasim's business was registered under the name of Villa Shipping and Trading Company Limited (Villa).

Since then, the company has diversified its business with substantial national share in diverse industries such as tourism, transport, construction, manufacturing, Gas, Cement trade, Media and Communication, in addition to general trading, with Sole Distributorships of international products. Shell and Agfa are among the brand names represented by Villa in the Maldives.

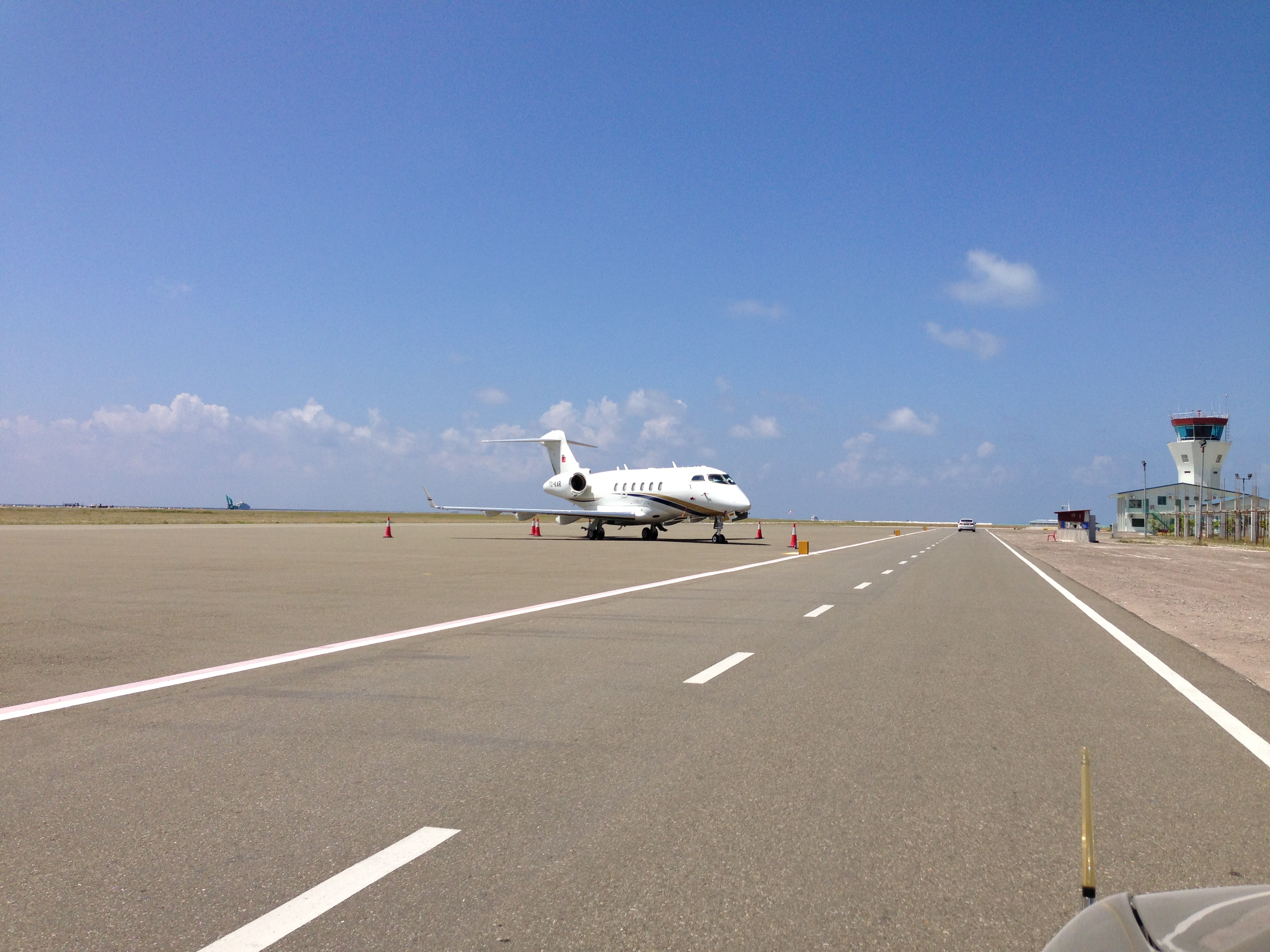
Private jet landed in Maamigili International Airport

The shareholders of the holding company, Villa Shipping & Trading Company Private Limited (VSTC) are Qasim Ibrahim and his wife Rabia Hussain, holding 95% and 5% respectively. For strategic reasons, Villa Shipping (Singapore) Pte Limited was incorporated in Singapore on December 19, 1991, a 100% subsidiary. The paid up capital by Villa Shipping (Singapore) now stands at S$500,000.

On 23 July 1997, with the primary objective of promoting Villa Resorts, opened in Frankfurt, Germany. Villa Holidays Touristik GmbH was incorporated with a paid-up capital of DM500,000,000. The company acts as a wholesaler for holiday packages to the Maldives, an agent for sales of hotel rooms, sale of air tickets, and a vehicle for acquiring and trading of tourism related properties and real estate such as hotels and resorts worldwide. It has since become a major subsidiary to promote the Group's own resorts, Fun Island, Paradise Island, Sun Island, Holiday Island and Royal Island Villa Hotels Maldives.

Villa Hotels, Tokyo and Villa Hotels, Hong Kong were established in 2001 and 2002 respectively.

Some of Qasim's recent achievements in business include the completion of the Maamigili International Airport in Ari Atoll, and the formation and operation of Villa Air (Flyme), a fully owned subsidiary of the Villa Group.

== See also ==
- Qasim Ibrahim
- Maamigili International Airport (Villa)
- Flyme (Villa Air)
