= 2009 Maldivian parliamentary election =

- 9 May 2009
- All 77 seats in the People's Majlis; 39 seats needed for a majority
| Party | Leader | Vote % | Seats | +/– |
|---|---|---|---|---|
| MDP | Mohamed Nasheed | 30.93 | 26 | +8 |
| DRP | Maumoon Abdul Gayoom | 24.37 | 28 | +8 |
| PA | Abdulla Yameen | 5.00 | 7 | New |
| JP | Qasim Ibrahim | 4.16 | 1 | New |
| DQP | Hassan Saeed | 3.50 | 2 | New |
| Independents | – | 30.18 | 13 | +9 |
This lists parties that won seats. See the complete results below.
Results by constituency
| Speaker before | Speaker after |
|---|---|
| Mohamed Shihab; JP | Abdulla Shahid; DRP |

Parliamentary elections were held in the Maldives on 9 May 2009.

== Background ==
Political parties in the Maldives were legalised on 2 June 2005 after a unanimous vote in the Majlis which allowed a multi-party system to contest presidential and parliamentary elections after 30 years of autocratic rule by Maumoon Abdul Gayoom. On 28 October 2008, Mohamed Nasheed, leader of the Maldivian Democratic Party (MDP) defeated Gayoom in the country's democratic presidential elections. Following the election, Nasheed and Mohamed Waheed Hassan were sworn in as the President and Vice President on 11 November in a special session of the Majlis at the Dharubaaruge.

== Electoral system ==
On 10 February 2009, the Majlis voted 36–0 (with one abstention) to pass the Parliamentary Constituencies Bill, which Nasheed signed into law later that day. It was the first act he signed as president after being inaugurated in November 2008. In the law, each administrative atoll's population determines how many electoral constituencies will be created. On 9 March 2009, the Elections Commission of the Maldives announced there were 214,405 eligible voters.

== Results ==
The result in constituency N-02 Thimarafushi Dhaairaa was annulled due to irregularities and reported intimidation by the MDP at one polling region; polling was repeated on 11 July 2009. According to preliminary results, the MDP still won the seat.

| Party | Votes | % | Seats | +/– |
|---|---|---|---|---|
| Maldivian Democratic Party | 51,184 | 30.93 | 26 | +8 |
| Dhivehi Rayyithunge Party | 40,339 | 24.37 | 28 | +8 |
| People's Alliance | 8,283 | 5.00 | 7 | New |
| Jumhooree Party | 6,882 | 4.16 | 1 | New |
| Dhivehi Qaumee Party | 5,795 | 3.50 | 2 | New |
| Adhaalath Party | 1,487 | 0.90 | 0 | New |
| Social Liberal Party | 674 | 0.41 | 0 | New |
| Gaumee Itthihaad | 518 | 0.31 | 0 | New |
| Islamic Democratic Party | 214 | 0.13 | 0 | New |
| Maldives National Congress | 119 | 0.07 | 0 | New |
| Maldivian Labour Party | 50 | 0.03 | 0 | New |
| Independents | 49,954 | 30.18 | 13 | +9 |
| Total | 165,499 | 100.00 | 77 | 0 |
| Valid votes | 165,499 | 98.92 | | |
| Invalid/blank votes | 1,806 | 1.08 | | |
| Total votes | 167,305 | 100.00 | | |
Source: Election Passport
