= Ahmed Salim =

Ahmed Salim or Ahmad Salim may refer to:

- Ahmed Salim (producer), British social entrepreneur
- Ahmad Salim (1945–2023), Pakistani writer
- Ahmad Salim (1933-1996), better known by his birth name Wim Umboh, Indonesian director
- Ahmed Salim (murderer) (1989-2024), Bangladeshi convicted murderer executed in Singapore

== See also ==
- Ahmed Saleem (disambiguation)
