= Maldivian Labour Party =

Political party in the Maldives from 2008 to 2013

- President: Ahmed Saleem (former)
- Founded: 5 September 2008

The Maldivian Labour Party was a political party in the Maldives. It was registered with the Elections Commission on 5 September 2008. The party was originally called the Poverty Alleviating Party, before changing to the Maldivian Labour Party in 2009. The party's vice-president was Ahmed Saleem, who was an independent member of parliament for Baa Atoll, Eydhafushi, who is now a member of the People's National Congress.

The party was dissolved in 2013.
