= Mogu Mogu =

Drink brand

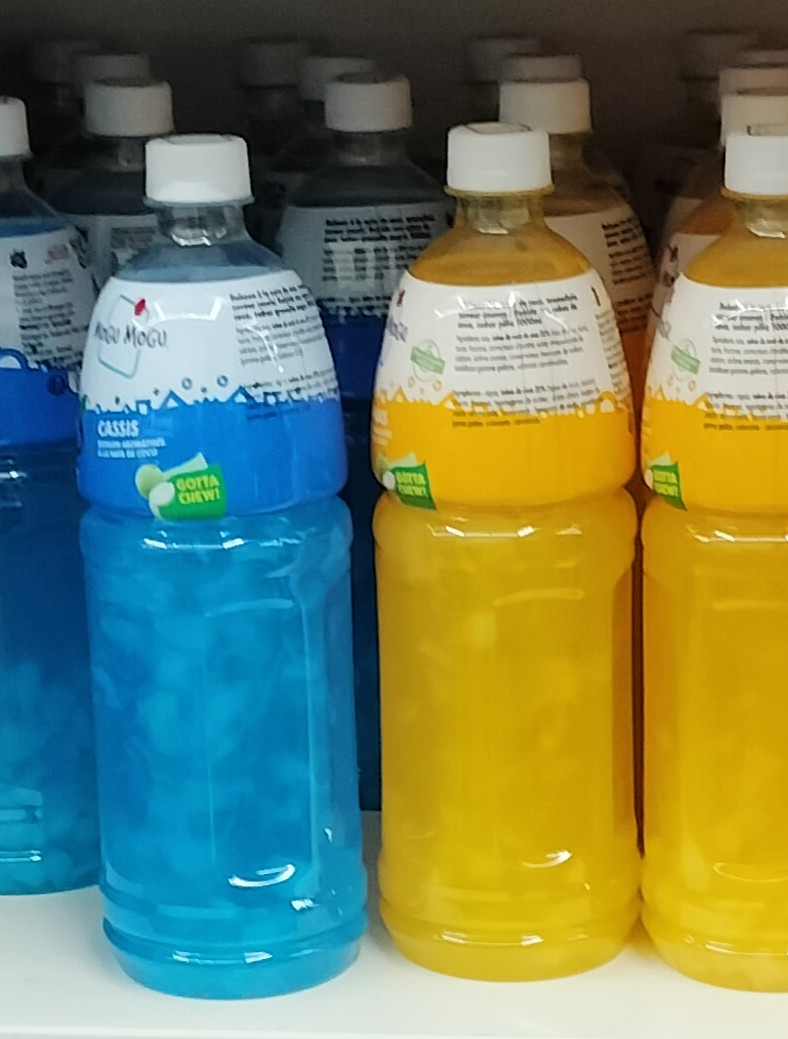
- Bottles of Mogu Mogu (1 l size) on a store shelf in Europe
- Produced by: Sappe
- Country: Thailand
- Introduced: 2001
- Markets: Worldwide

Mogu Mogu is a brand of fruit-flavoured drink with pieces of nata de coco (coconut jelly), produced by Thailand-based Sappe Public Company Limited and exported to many international markets, especially South Korea, the Philippines, Indonesia and France.

== History ==
Mogu Mogu was conceived in 2001, when the company was a small family business making bakery products, known as Sapanan General Food Co., Ltd. The family head, Anan Ruckariyaphong, wanted to expand into the beverage business, and his son Adisak (now Sappe's vice chairman), who had just returned from studies in Japan, came up with the idea of differentiating the product by adding nata de coco. The product, which Sappe says was the first of its kind, was well received by testers, but sold poorly in the lower-income market that Sapanan then catered to, with unattractive packaging and an original unit price of ten baht (US$0.23 at the time). Sales improved after a packaging redesign, with the price reduced to five baht ($0.11). The product was also given the name Mogu Mogu, after the Japanese onomatopoeia for the sound of chewing, mogu (もぐ).

Mogu Mogu was initially sold by small-scale retailers, but was limited to the low five-baht price point by Sapanan's existing market. Once the company expanded into newer retail channels, sales sharply increased, allowing the company to invest in increasing production capacity. Mogu Mogu then achieved nationwide distribution via CP All's chain of 7-Eleven convenience stores in 2006, and became very successful, prompting the emergence of similar competing products. However, as heavy competition in the beverage market led to price wars in the late 2000s, the company decided to pull back from the domestic market and focus on overseas expansion instead. Mogu Mogu was withdrawn from the Thai market for one year between 2010 and 2011, and again in 2016, after which it was replaced by local sister brand Gumi Gumi.

As of 2024, Mogu Mogu is not available in Thailand, save for certain seasonal promotional events.

== International sales ==
Internationally, Mogu Mogu is sold in 98 countries as of 2023, with the most significant market presence in South Korea, the Philippines, Indonesia and France.

The brand entered the South Korean market in 2011, but faced difficulties for seven years before achieving widespread brand recognition. In 2019, it entered into a brand-licensing partnership with Lotte Corporation. Sappe has since pursued marketing campaigns for Mogu Mogu through K-pop, sponsoring the boy group BTS's variety show Run BTS as well as the 2023 K-drama Crash Course in Romance. In 2024, the company named Seventeen as Mogu Mogu's global brand ambassador.

Mogu Mogu was launched in the Philippines in 2008, and began distribution through schools, events, and a few convenience store chains. Within five years it had expanded nationwide. Sappe established a local subsidiary—Sappe Philippines Corporation—to oversee operations in the country in 2023.

Sappe began heavily expanding Mogu Mogu's reach in Europe in the 2020s, focusing on France as the primary market with considerable success. Sappe reported a year-on-year sales growth in the country at 285.4% for 2023. The drink's popularity also spread to nearby countries, particularly Portugal and Belgium, in part fuelled by online marketing via social media influencers (especially in the United Kingdom) and viral TikTok trends.

== Description ==
Mogu Mogu is a ready-to-drink non-carbonated fruit-flavoured soft drink, with cubes of nata de coco suspended inside. It is available in up to 24 flavours (depending on region), and is typically packaged in 320-ml bottles, as well as in larger ones of 1,000 ml.

Commentators and industry analysts have compared the drink's rise in popularity to that of bubble tea, another drink with chewable ingredients. It was observed that the drinking experience, with the chewable nata de coco pieces, introduced a novelty that helped Mogu Mogu stand out among other products. This is emphasized in the drink's marketing, which features the slogan "You Gotta Chew!"

Mogu Mogu is a sugar-sweetened beverage. In Singapore, regulations introduced in 2022 assigned it a Nutri-Grade of D, which prohibits advertising. The brand also produces a reduced-sugar series, and has since introduced sugar-free varieties.
