= Dhiggaru =

Dhiggaru ދިއްގަރު
- Inhabited island
- Location in Maldives
- Coordinates: 03°06′40″N 73°34′00″E
- Country: Maldives
- Administrative atoll: Meemu Atoll
- Distance to Malé: 117.85 km (73.23 mi)

Dimensions
  - Length: 0.280 km (0.174 mi)
  - Width: 0.250 km (0.155 mi)

Population (2022)
  - Total: 1,099
- Time zone: UTC+05:00 (MST)

Dhiggaru (Dhivehi: ދިއްގަރު) is one of the inhabited islands of Meemu Atoll in the Maldives.

== Geography ==
The island is 117.85 km (73 mi; 64 nmi) south of the country's capital, Malé. The land area of the island is 9.9 ha (24 acres) in 2018. The land area is up from 4.61 ha (11.4 acres) in 2007.

== Demography ==
Historical population
Year	Pop.	±%
2006	909	—
2014	947	+4.2%
2022	1,099	+16.1%
2006-2022: Census populations Source:

== Healthcare ==
Dhiggaru has a pharmacy.

== Transport ==
The enlargement of the island's harbour was contracted to MTCC in 2015 when construction also began, completed in 2016 and inaugurated in 2018.
