= Maamigili (Alif Dhaalu Atoll) =

Maamigili މާމިގިލި
- Inhabited island
- Location in Maldives
- Coordinates: 03°28′30″N 72°50′15″E
- Country: Maldives
- Administrative atoll: Alif Dhaal Atoll
- Distance to Malé: 107.51 km (66.80 mi)

Dimensions
  - Length: 1.350 km (0.839 mi)
  - Width: 0.775 km (0.482 mi)

Population (2022) (including foreigners)
  - Total: 2,798
- Time zone: UTC+05:00 (MST)

Maamigili (Dhivehi: މާމިގިލި) is the largest and most populous of the islands of Alif Dhaal Atoll which border the South Ari Marine Protected Area.

== Geography ==
The island is 107.51 km (67 mi; 58 nmi) southwest of the country's capital, Malé. This tsland i naturally round in shape, owing to its position on one of the edge of one of the widest channels in the MPA.

== Demography ==
Historical population
| Year | Pop. | ±% |
|---|---|---|
| 2006 | 1,671 | — |
| 2014 | 2,079 | +24.4% |
| 2022 | 2,798 | +34.6% |
2006-2022: Census populations Source:

== Economy ==
The main area of habitation is toward the eastern half of the island. A deep-water access harbour leads toward the main street, which runs east to west straight through the heart of the island. This street is full of different kinds of shops, with the tourist souvenir shops dominating the eastern end. Toward the western end of the street is a small mosque, the medical centre, the school and the island council offices.

Adding to this the development, a new deep water harbour and airport complex has been constructed. The traditional harbour has been expanded by several times its original size, and is now capable of accommodating 20 metre plus liveaboard vessels.

== Transport ==
=== Ferry ===
Maamigili is connected by ferry service from Malé.

=== Airport ===
Villa International Airport Maamigili has been built on the southern edge of the island, the huge lagoon has been reclaimed, adding an area of over 73 hectares to the original island. This was done to construct the first airport in Ari atoll, with a plan to link into the network of larger capacity terrestrial landing planes, which are capable of reaching all parts of the country. The airport will also have a pilot training school. Progress on the construction of the airport is gathering pace, with regular flights being scheduled to begin by 2013.

=== Taxi ===
The island has about six taxi cars and around three pickups as taxi for various purposes.

== See also ==
- Ariadhoo island close to Maamigili
