= Abdul Raheem Abdulla =

Speaker of the People's Majlis since 2024

- ޢަބްދުއްރަޙީމް ޢަބްދުﷲ
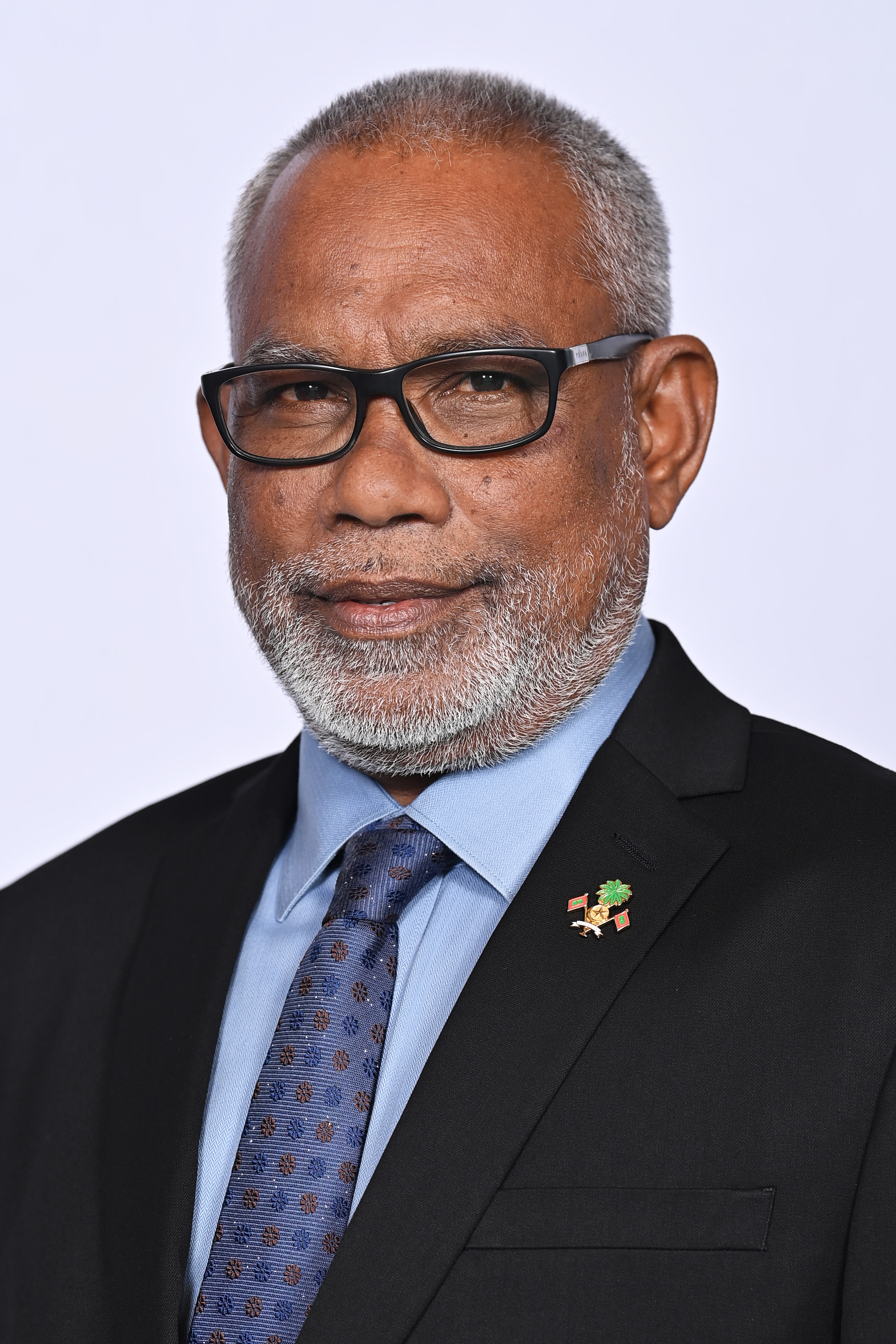
- Official portrait, 2023

21st Speaker of the People's Majlis
- Incumbent
- Assumed office 28 May 2024
- President: Mohamed Muizzu
- Deputy: Ahmed Nazim (2024–2026); Ahmed Saleem
- Preceded by: Mohamed Aslam

Special Advisor to the President
- In office 17 November 2023 – 28 May 2024
- President: Mohamed Muizzu
- Succeeded by: Mohamed Waheed Hassan

Chairperson of the People's National Congress
- Incumbent
- Assumed office 5 October 2023

Member of the People's Majlis
- Incumbent
- Assumed office 28 May 2024
- Preceded by: Moosa Siraj
- Constituency: Fonadhoo
- In office 28 May 2009 – 28 May 2019
- Succeeded by: Moosa Siraj
- Constituency: Fonadhoo

Personal details
- Born: 19 April 1967 (age 59) Fonadhoo, Laamu Atoll, Maldives
- Party: People's National Congress
- Other political affiliations: Progressive Party of Maldives (2014–2025) People's Alliance (2008–2013)
- Spouse: Dhiyana Hussain
- Children: Ibrahim Faisal

Abdul Raheem Abdulla (Dhivehi: ޢަބްދުއްރަޙީމް ޢަބްދުﷲ; born 19 April 1967) more popularly known as Adhurey is a Maldivian politician who has served as the 21st speaker of the People's Majlis since 2024. A member of the People's National Congress (PNC), he previously served as the Special Advisor to the President from 2023 to 2024. He is the chairman of the PNC since 2023.

== Early life ==
Abdul Raheem Abdulla was born to Maryam Ahmed on 19 April 1967 in Fonadhoo.

He was exiled as punishment of a crime during the presidency of Maumoon Abdul Gayoom for stealing corrugated roofing sheets from the State Trading Organisation and became known as "Tinu Adhurey".

== Career ==
Abdulla was elected to the 17th People's Majlis in 2009 representing the People's Alliance party (PA), headed by ex-President Abdulla Yameen. In 2014, he was reelected representing the Progressive Party of Maldives in Fonadhoo in the 18th People's Majlis, and was nominated as the party's candidate for Deputy Speaker, but lost to Reeko Moosa Manik.

He was appointed Vice President of PPM after losing an election for the same. Abdul Raheem was of the founding members of the People's National Congress (PNC), of which he later became the chairperson. On 17 November 2023, he was appointed as the Special Advisor to the President. He was elected as the Speaker of the People's Majlis on 28 May 2024.

== Controversies and Gaffes ==
Abdulla was embroiled in a controversy after he referred to former President Mohamed Nasheed as a "Jew" and a "Munafiq of proportions hereto unseen in the country".

He was widely derided for claiming at a campaign event during the 2018 presidential election that it was attended by 200,000 people "because 50 multiplied by 4 is 200,000", and has been subsequently known has "Hisaabu Soa" or "Mathematics teacher", with grossly incorrect sums popularly referred to as "Adhureymatics".
