= Hassan Saeed =

Maldivian lawyer and politician

- ޑރ. ޙަސަން ސަޢީދު
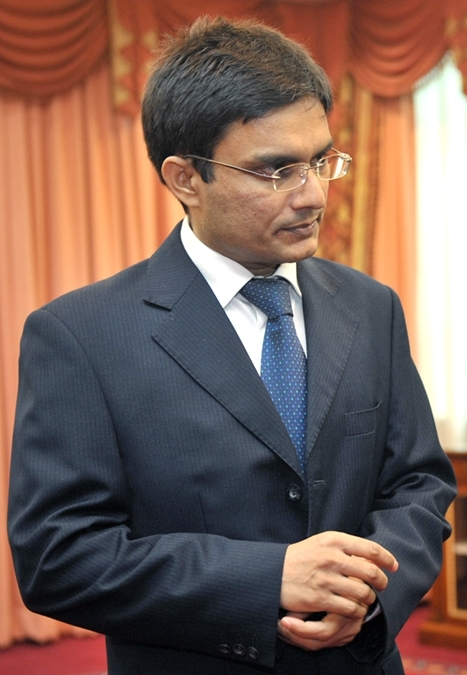
- Saeed in 2012
- Occupation: Former attorney general of maldives
- Years active: 2003-2007
- Theological work
- Main interests: Islam

Hassan Saeed (Dhivehi: ޑރ. ޙަސަން ސަޢީދު) was Attorney General of the Republic of Maldives from 11 November 2003, to 5 August 2007. He is the current managing partner of Chambers Inn and the managing director of Premier Property Pvt Ltd.

Prior to establishing his own law firm and entering real estate, Saeed served as a State Attorney, and after completing his doctorate in law at the University of Queensland and serving as the Chief Judge of the Criminal Court and the Juvenile Court, was appointed to the position of Attorney General of the Republic of Maldives.

As the Attorney General, Saeed served as the chief legal advisor to the Maldivian government and led a long series of reforms to overhaul and transform the country into a functional liberal democracy. These reforms took inspiration from the legal systems of modern Western democracies while maintaining local and Islamic distinctives.

In June 2007, Saeed resigned in protest, arguing that the government was not sincere in the process and was slowing and even trying to reverse the reforms.

In the country's first ever multiparty democratic election, Saeed contested as an independent candidate and came third on an agenda of clean, transparent governance and reform.

He also served as an advisor to two different presidents: President Mohamed Nasheed, from 2008 to 2009, and President Mohammed Waheed Hassan from 2012 to 2013. Saeed has drafted 24 Bills for government agencies and political parties.

After serving in the Maldivian government for many years, Saeed turned to corporate law and real estate. Today, Saeed is an expert on Maldivian real estate law and management and has liaised with the country's leading developers from the first ever condominium built in the country in 2009.

== Education ==
A recognised scholar and lifelong student, Saeed did not receive any formal schooling. At the age of 10 he was enrolled in Jamiah Salafiyaa – a highly conservative Islamic Theology madrasa in Pakistan where he studied classic Islamic studies for 7 years in Urdu and Arabic languages. In 1988 he joined a pre-university program at the Islamic University of Malaysia, where he spent initial two years learning the English language before beginning legal education.

Saeed earned a Doctor of Philosophy degree from the University of Queensland in 2003, alongside a Master of Comparative Law from International Islamic University in 1997 and a Bachelor of Law with Honours from the same institution in 1995. Saeed's masters and doctoral theses focused on constitutional law and free speech.

== Academia ==
He has lectured in law faculties at international universities, including his alma mater, the University of Queensland. He is also an Islamic scholar that has written on liberal Islam, having co-authored a book on the subject entitled "Freedom of Religion, Apostasy, and Islam" with Professor Abdullah Saeed of University of Melbourne, and assisted Professor Keith Fletcher in updating "Partnership Law in Australia and New Zealand" – a leading textbook on the subject. He also authored a number of books and reports on the Maldives rights and democracy, some of which include "Democracy Betrayed Behind the Mask of The Island President"; "Lies, Misleading and Untold Truth"; and "Male International Airport Long-term Lease to GMR Company – Challenges and Losses thereof".

He also was a partner in a project for the introduction of Islamic Law at the University of Queensland, a subject which he went on to teach. He assisted in designing course outlines for "The Methodology of Islamic Law," a postgraduate course for University of Melbourne, Australia.

Today Saeed owns and operates the country's largest and most comprehensive legal database "www.gaanoon.com." The project provides:

1. All laws, regulations, decrees, and bylaws from a single source.
2. The most authoritative and comprehensive legal dictionary.
3. Consolidated all the laws.

== Membership/Professional Qualification ==
Saeed is a registered Barrister-at-Law in the High Court of Australia and a registered Advocator and Solicitor in the Supreme Court of Maldives. He served as a member of the Maldives Constitutional Assembly, Chairman of the National Law Commission and Member of the Judicial Service Commission. Briefly he served as a Member of the Board of Governors of International Islamic University Malaysia. He served as the Vice-President of People Party (Dhivehi Rayyithunge Party) and later he founded and served as the President of the Maldives National Party (Dhivehi Qaumi Party).

== Reforms ==
As the Attorney General of the Republic of Maldives and as the Chief Judge of the Criminal Court and Juvenile Court in the Maldives, Saeed introduced reforms that addressed human rights abuses and abuses of power.

=== Reforms as the Chief Judge ===
Saeed introduced measures to enhance the rights of defendants. These included access to legal representation, access to evidence, medical examinations at the court's expense in case of alleged torture or physical violence and barring handcuffed defendants (unless violent). He introduced sentencing guidelines, computerised the country's 25-year-old criminal records, and created the first ever self-funded medical insurance scheme for judges.

Saeed's appointment as the Chief Judge of the Criminal Court and the Juvenile Court came at the height of the 25-year authoritarian rule of President Gayyoom. This was a period in which citizens lacked very basic human rights, 97% of convictions were based on confessions, judges were hired and fired at the will of the executive branch, and judges lacked mandates for such reform initiatives. Against this, Saeed's reforms were substantial.

=== Reforms as the Attorney General ===
Saeed used his position as the Attorney General to advance human rights and the enhance political rights.

His formal legal opinion on citizens’ rights to form political parties paved the way for the first registration of political parties with state recognition and funding. He also headed the establishment of the first Human Rights Commission and provided its legislative framework. Saeed extended maximum protection for free speech by ending the criminal prosecution of reporters and editors and decriminalising defamation and adding protections for whistleblowers.

Saeed introduced the National Criminal Justice Reform Plan. The Plan introduced a modern Penal Code in accord with classic Islamic law and local custom while, to some extent, complying with Western and international norms.

He also replaced the confession-based investigation, prosecution, and conviction system with that of an evidence-based system. These included access to legal counsel during investigation, audio-video recording of investigations, introduction of arrestable and non-arrestable offences, habeas corpus, a bail system, separation of police from military, and the establishment of police oversight mechanisms. He also opened the country's prison systems to domestic and international human rights bodies such as Amnesty International, the Red Cross, the Human Rights Commission of the Maldives, and parliamentary and judiciary committees.

Saeed spearheaded the establishment of the Judicial Service Commission (as opposed to the President and the Justice Minister) to oversee judges. He started a program to replace old untrained judges with Western-educated law graduates. He ensured the selection of an equal number of male and female students, which catalysed the appointment of the first female judges in the country, against the outcry of conservative religious groups.

Saeed also discarded the old rules requiring government written consent for citizens to bring legal action against the state in civil matters.

Seeing widespread domestic and international support for the reforms Saeed was introducing, several cabinet ministers who had been working in the country's dictatorial setup, jumped onto the reformist bandwagon. This led to parallel reforms in several other fronts. This soon led to the defeat of the conservative elements in the government.

Preceded by Mohamed Munavvar	Attorney General of the Maldives; 2003–2007	Succeeded by Azima Shukoor
