= People's National Congress (Maldives) =

Political party in the Maldives

People's National Congress ޕީޕަލްސް ނޭޝަނަލް ކޮންގްރެސް
- Abbreviation: PNC
- President: Mohamed Muizzu
- Chairperson: Abdul Raheem Abdulla
- Secretary-General: Moosa Fathuhy
- Spokesperson: Heena Waleed
- Vice Presidents: Hussain Mohamed Latheef; Mohamed Ghassan Maumoon; Ahmed Shiyam; Mohamed Saeed; Mohamed Hussain Shareef; Ibrahim Shujau; Abdulla Rafiu; Fathimath Saudha
- Founder: Abdulla Yameen
- Founded: 31 January 2019; Malé, Maldives
- Split from: Progressive Party of Maldives
- Headquarters: Veyovilla, Henveiru, Malé, Maldives
- Membership (November 2026): 99,638
- Ideology: Islamism; Right-wing populism
- Political position: Centre-right to right-wing
- Colors: Turqoise
- People's Majlis: 74 / 93
- City Mayors: 0 / 5
- City Council Seats: 6 / 52

Party flag

Website
- pnc.mv

The People's National Congress, (Note: Dhivehi: ޕީޕަލްސް ނެޝެނަލް ކޮންގްރެސް) abbreviated as PNC, is a political party in the Maldives founded in January 2019 and the current governing party. It is one of the two major political parties in the Maldives, with the other being the Maldivian Democratic Party. The party's formation was spearheaded by former President Abdulla Yameen Abdul Gayoom, who had been in a dispute with the leadership of the Progressive Party of Maldives.

The PNC was founded with support from Yameen by Fonadhoo MP Abdul Raheem Abdulla, and was also joined by Nilandhoo MP Abdulla Khaleel. They took the positions of president and vice president of the party, respectively, shortly after.

== History ==
=== 2019–2023 ===
The PNC formed an alliance with the PPM on 2 February 2019, and together operated as the "Progressive Congress Coalition".

The PNC won 3 seats in the 19th Parliament, namely Vice Presidents Mohamed Saeed (Maavah constituency) and Adam Shareef Umar (Maduvvari constituency), and Ibrahim Fazul Rasheed (Felidhoo constituency). Interim party leader Abdul Raheem Abdulla lost his seat in Fonadhoo constituency.

The party had scheduled to hold its Inaugural National Conference in late April 2019, where appointments for full-term party positions will be made. On 26 April 2019 the congress was held and former MP Ahmed Nihan Hussain Manik, former MP Ibrahim Shujau and former Economic Minister Mohamed Saeed was elected the vice-presidents of the party. However, after former MP Ahmed Nihan Hussain Manik departed the party, former Fenaka Managing Director Mohamed Nimal was appointed vice-president of PNC.

=== 2023–present (ruling party) ===
On 30 September 2023, the PNC candidate, Mohamed Muizzu, won the second-round runoff of the Maldives presidential election, beating incumbent president, Ibrahim Solih, with 54% of the vote.

On Friday 17 November 2023, the PNC became the ruling party of Maldives after Muizzu took office.

In the days following, the internal discord within the PPM-PNC coalition increased, and came to a head on Thursday. The faction aligned with former President Abdulla Yameen Abdul Gayoom was demanding Muizzu's resignation. On Thursday night, Yameen resigned from his position as the leader of the PPM and declared his intention to leave the party, signaling his plan to establish a new political entity named the People's National Front.

==== Opposition to Israel Passport Ban ====
In 2024, Maldivian MP Meekail Ahmed Naseem submitted a bill to the parliament calling for a ban on entry for Israeli passport holders. However, President Mohamed Muizzu’s party, the People’s National Congress (PNC), has faced criticism for delaying the bill’s implementation through the parliament, raising concerns that it may be a public relations move rather than a genuine effort to enforce the ban.

==== Illegitimate party membership ====
In December 2024, it was found out that many people were being switched political parties to PNC. Ranging from former state ministers as well as parliamentarians from the opposition. It was alleged that the Homeland Minister Ali Ihusaan was recruiting under age individuals to join by collecting personal information, which he denied.

==== PNC Congress ====
During 15–19 September 2026, PNC held its congress meeting which had over 1300 members in attendance at Social Centre. During the meeting, the election for vice presidents of the party began, with Abdulla Rafiu, Ahmed Shiyam, Fathimath Saudha, Ibrahim Shujau, Mohamed Saeed, and Mohamed Hussain Shareef being elected. There had been allegations regarding the positions contested being already pre-determined and that there had been leadership interference in the election.

== Election results ==
=== President elections ===
Election	Party candidate	Running mate	Votes	%	Votes	%	Result
Election	Party candidate	Running mate	First round		Second round		Result
2023	Mohamed Muizzu	Hussain Mohamed Latheef	101,635	46.06%	128,929	54.06%	Elected ✓

=== People's Majlis ===
Year	Party Leader	Votes	Vote %	Seats	+/–
2019	Abdul Raheem Abdulla	13,931	6.63	3 / 87	New
2024	Mohamed Muizzu	101,120	48.06	66 / 93	▲63

== See also ==
- List of Islamic political parties
