= Qasim Ibrahim =

Maldivan businessman and politician (born 1951)

Qasim Ibrahim NIIV NMSI
- ޤާސިމް އިބްރާހިމް
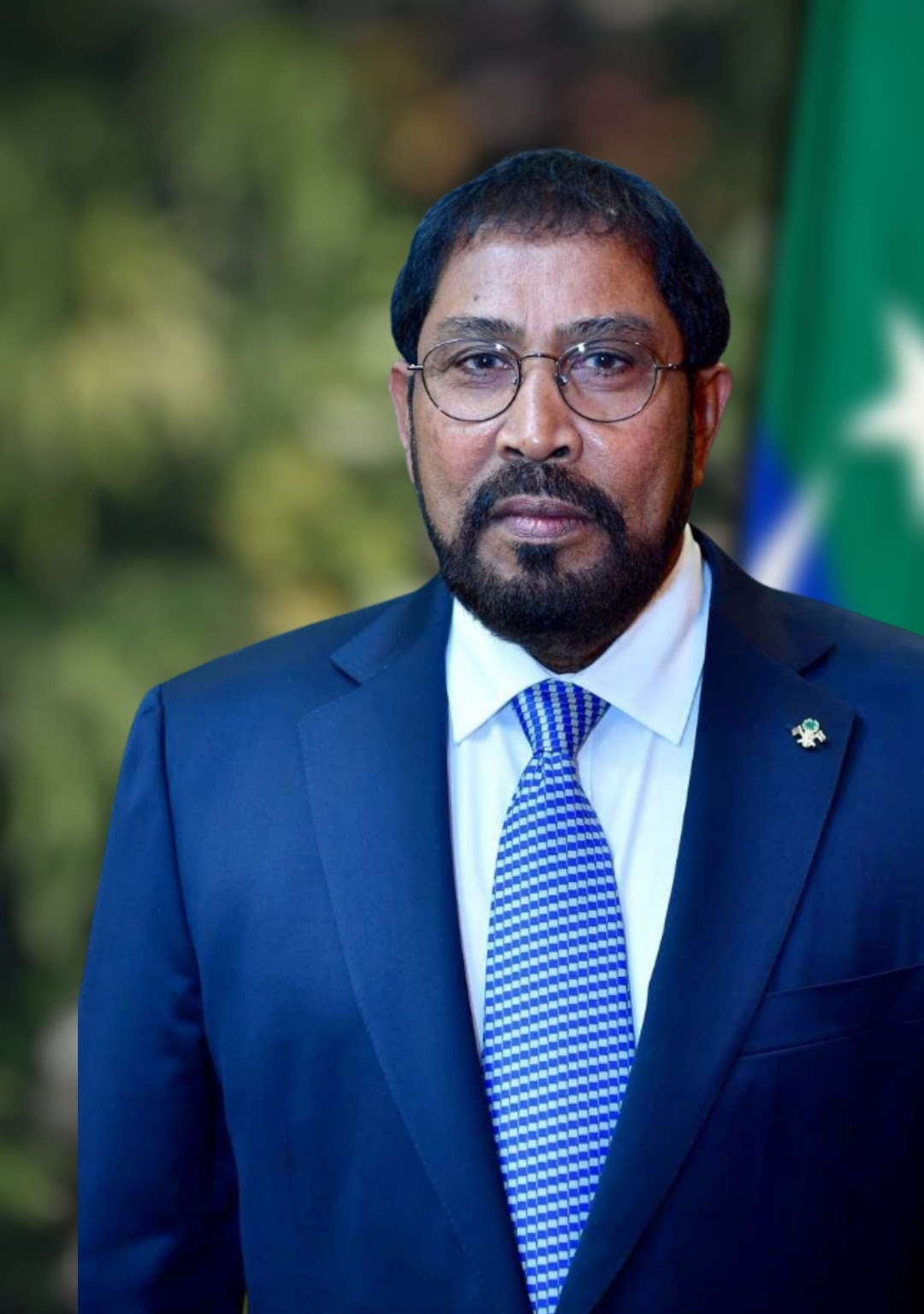
- Official portrait, 2018

18th Speaker of the People's Majlis
- In office 1 November 2018 – 27 May 2019
- President: Abdulla Yameen; Ibrahim Mohamed Solih
- Preceded by: Abdulla Maseeh Mohamed
- Succeeded by: Mohamed Nasheed

Member of the People's Majlis
- Incumbent
- Assumed office 28 May 2009
- Preceded by: Constituency created
- Constituency: Maamingili

Minister of Home Affairs
- In office 12 November 2008 – 3 December 2008
- President: Mohamed Nasheed
- Preceded by: Abdulla Kamaaludeen
- Succeeded by: Mohamed Shihab

Personal details
- Born: 30 August 1951 (age 75) Maamingili, Alif Dhaal Atoll, Sultanate of the Maldive Islands
- Party: Maldivian Democratic Party (2003–2005); Dhivehi Rayyithunge Party (2005–2008); Jumhooree Party (since 2008)
- Height: 1.67 m (5 ft 6 in)
- Spouse(s): Aishath Nahula (m. 2001) Rabiyya Raniya Abdul Haamid (m. 2020) Nasheedha
- Children: 14
- Education: Honorary Degree, Doctor of Entrepreneurship, Open University Malaysia
- Occupation: Member of Parliament for Maamingili constituency Chairman & Largest Shareholder of Villa Group
- Awards: List

Qasim Ibrahim, NIIV, NMSI (born 30 August 1951), also known as Burumaa Qasim, is a Maldivian politician, business magnate and philanthropist. He is widely regarded as one of the country's wealthiest businessmen as the founder and chairman of the Villa Group. Ibrahim ran as a member of the Jumhooree Party in the presidential elections of 2013, but lost in the first round. He is also the leader of the party. He also competed for presidential elections of 2023; and lost.

== Business career ==
In 1969, Ibrahim began work as a clerk at the government hospital in Malé. In 1973, he left the hospital to work as a manager at M/S Alia Furniture Mart. He also worked temporarily for Crescent, a government trading organization.

In 1974, Ibrahim joined an outlet of the Maldivian government's BoduStore, now known as the State Trading Organization. Two years later, in 1976, he set up his own trading business in commodities such as rice, tobacco, diesel, and kerosene, which proved to be profitable. The business experienced rapid growth. He later expanded his business with a small loan of US$2,000 from State Bank of India (SBI), which is still his primary banker.

After four years, Ibrahim was able to purchase his first shipping vessel, an old fishing boat converted to carry cargo and oil, to facilitate oil imports. By 14 April 1986, Ibrahim's business was registered under the name of Villa Shipping and Trading Company Limited (Villa). Since then, the company has diversified its business, gaining a substantial market share in diverse Maldivian industries including tourism, transport, construction, manufacturing, gas, the cement trade, and media/communication as well as general trading as the sole Maldivian distributor of international products. Shell and Agfa are among the brand names represented by Villa in the Maldives.

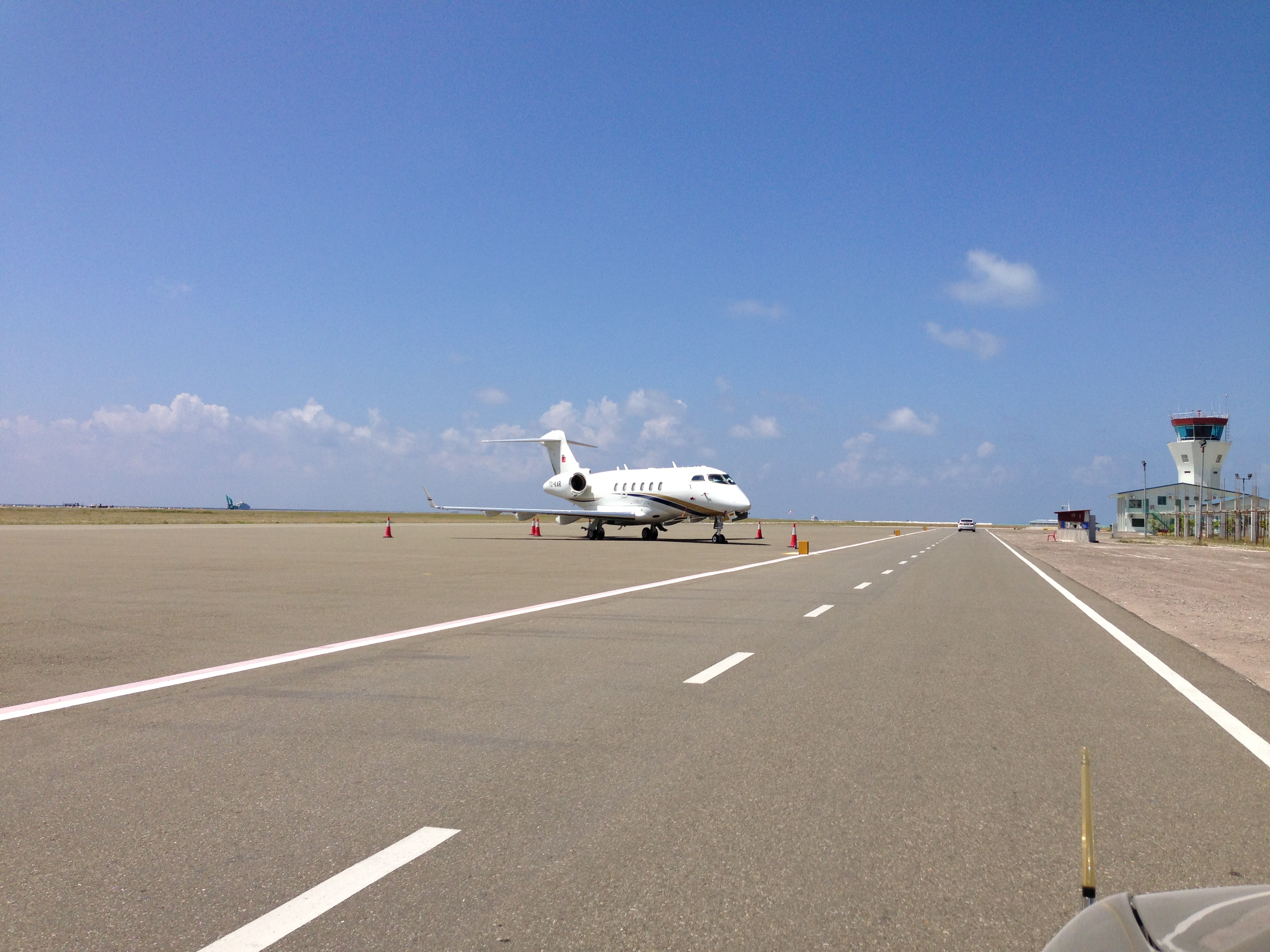
Private jet landing at Villa International Airport Maamigili

The shareholders of the holding company, Villa Shipping & Trading Company Private Limited (VSTC) are Qasim Ibrahim and one of his wife, Rabia Hussain, who respectively hold 95% and 5% of the company's shares. For strategic reasons, Villa Shipping (Singapore) Pte Limited was incorporated in Singapore on 19 December 1991 as a subsidiary of Villa. The capital paid upfront by Villa Shipping (Singapore) now stands at $500,000.

On 14 July 1995, with the primary objective of promoting Villa resorts, Villa Holidays Touristik GmbH opened in Frankfurt, Germany and was incorporated with a paid-upfront-capital of DM 499,999. The company acts as a wholesaler of holiday vacation packages to the Maldives, an agent for sales of hotel rooms and air tickets, and as an international vehicle for acquiring and trading tourism related properties and real estate such as hotels and resorts. It has since become a major subsidiary promoting the group's own resorts Fun Island, Paradise Island, Sun Island, Holiday Island and Royal Island.

Villa Hotels, Tokyo and Villa Hotels, Hong Kong were established in 2001 and 2002 respectively.

Ibrahim has also funded many infrastructure projects in several islands across the archipelago, most notably in constructing new harbors, schools and mosques. He is currently working on setting up a fully-operational General Hospital on Maamigili Island, which will feature the first dedicated cancer treatment facility in the country.

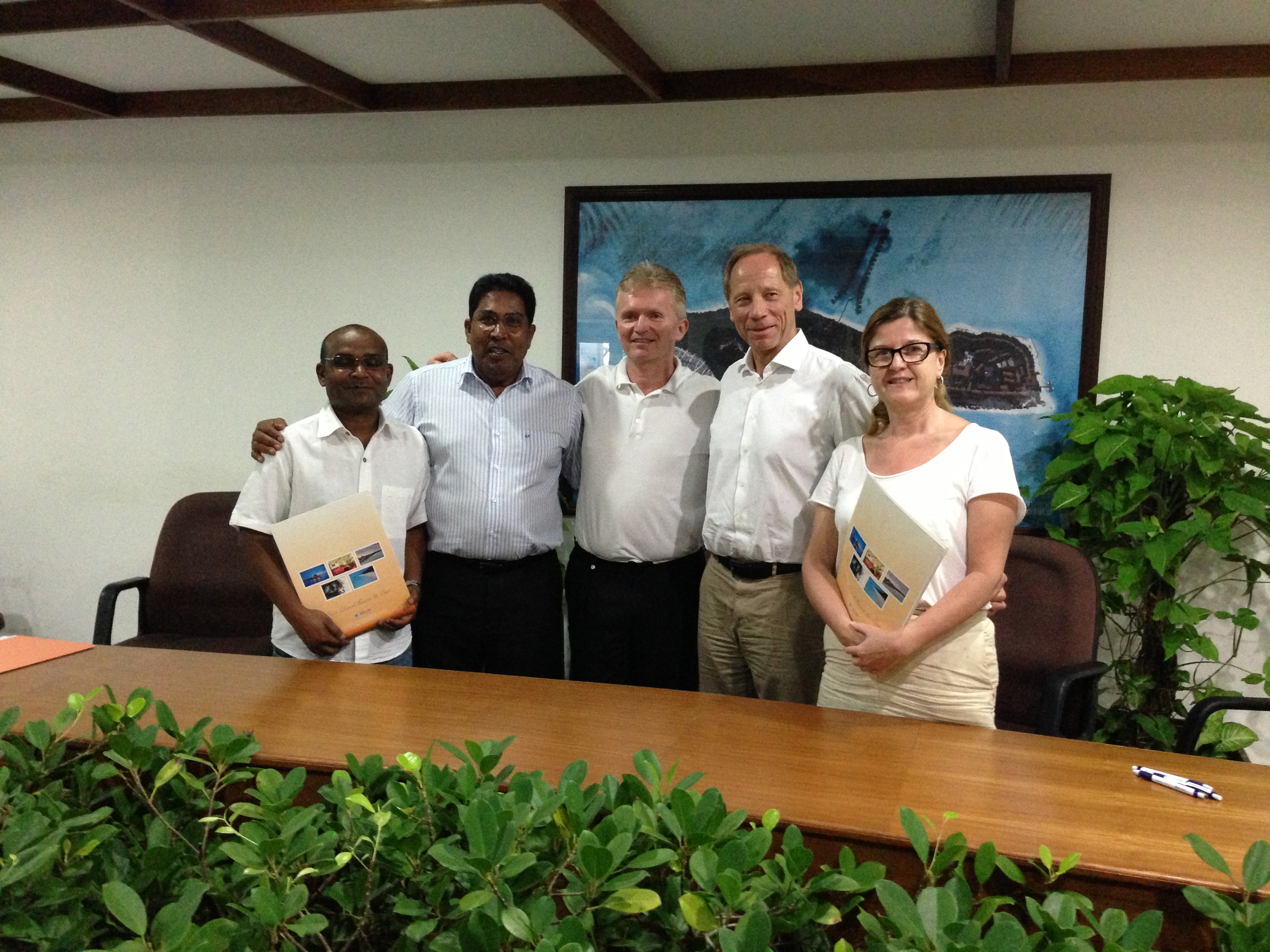
The signing of the MoU to develop the Maamigili General Hospital Master Plan

== Political career ==
Ibrahim was first elected as a Member of the Maldivian Parliament in 1989. In addition, he has held and still holds various other posts in a number of government committees and regional trade bodies, including:

- Presidential Candidate of the Jumhooree Party – 7 September 2013
- President of the Judicial Services Commission (JSC)
- Member of Parliament
- Minister of Home Affairs
- Presidential Candidate of the Jumhooree Party – October 2008 elections
- Leader of the Jumhooree Party : 2008 –
- Governor of the Central Bank of Maldives – July 2005 to July 2008
- Minister of Finance – July 2005 to July 2008
- Governor of Maldives Monetary Authority : 2005 – 2007
- Board member of the Bank of Maldives
- Board member of the Maldives Ports Authority (Government Appointment)
- Vice-President of the Maldives Association of Tourism Industry (MATI)
- President of the Maldives National Chamber of Commerce and Industry (MNCCI)
- President of the SAARC Chamber of Commerce and Industry

He resigned from his posts as the Minister of Finance and Treasury and as the Deputy Leader of the Dhivehi Rayyithunge Party (DRP) on 10 July 2008 to run in the first multi-party presidential elections in October 2008 as the candidate for the Jumhooree Party.

Ibrahim joined the MDP-led coalition in the second round of the elections and helped Mohamed Nasheed secure a historic victory and bring an end to the thirty-year rule of Maumoon Abdul Gayoom. Ibrahim initially joined President Nasheed's government as Minister for Home Affairs but resigned 20 days later, citing his dislike of President Nasheed's privatization policies. He became vocally opposed to Nasheed's government and was accused of having funded the anti-Nasheed protests that began in early 2012 that ultimately led to Nasheed's resignation after pressure from police and the army on 7 February 2012.

In 2023, Qasim Ibrahim was selected as the presidential primary for the Jumhooree Party to contest for the 2023 Maldivian presidential election. This time, the Jumhooree Party ran without a coalition, marking the first time. Qasim selected his running mate as Ameen Ibrahim. At the election day, Qasim received 5460 votes and didn't qualify for the runoff election. Senior members of JP has expressed support for President Solih during the runoff election.

In 2024, Qasim was the only member from his party to get a spot in the 2024 Maldivian parliamentary election.

== Political activism and imprisonment ==
Ibrahim had been imprisoned for political reasons both during Gayoom's regime as well as Nasheed's brief reign. He was arrested in 2009 on suspicion that he was bribing MPs to vote against the government of President Nasheed. He was later released without charge. He is currently representing the Maamigili Constituency in the Maldives Parliament.

=== Imprisonment ===
Qasim Ibrahim was arrested for speaking against the government on rally held by the Maldives United Opposition. He was accused of leading a failed bid in March to impeach Speaker Abdulla Maseeh Mohamed, a close ally of president Abdulla Yameen.

== Controversies ==
In September 2008, the Auditor General of the Maldives submitted a report to the People's Majlis which was published on the website of the Auditor General's office. It stated that the Villa Group had been found to be involved in the illicit trading of shares.

In July 2010, State Minister of Finance Ahmed Assad stated in a President's Office Press Briefing that Maldives was facing hurdles in borrowing money internationally because of a specific Majlis member who was borrowing large sums of money and lowering the country's credit rating. It was stated that this Member has made a request to the government to give him a ‘letter of no objection’ to borrow another large sum. Though the Minister refused to name the Majlis member at the conference, it was widely assumed in the Maldivian media that the Majlis member in question was Qasim Ibrahim.

In February 2013, Qasim Ibrahim, as the Parliament's representative to the Judicial Service Commission (JSC), accused UN Special Rapporteur on Independence of Judges and Lawyers Gabriela Knaul of lying and joking about the state of the Maldivian judicial system. Knaul's statements highlighted that the JSC – mandated with the appointment, transfer and removal of judges – was unable to perform its constitutional duty adequately in its current form. Her comment was among a number of preliminary observations on the Maldives’ judiciary and wider legal system following an eight-day fact-finding mission.

While Qasim Ibrahim was Finance Minister, there were rumors regarding the nature of the European Investment Bank's (EIB) investment in Maldivian tourism. The European Investment Bank had invested €50,000,000 to support the development of tourism after the 2004 Indian Ocean tsunami. According to the ECD in Colombo, there was no co-ordination between the EIB and the ECD during the design stage of the loans. Only after the ECD reported indications of misuse of money to EIB were some consultations held. Overall co-ordination between EIB and ECD is very limited.

== Awards ==
Ibrahim has received many awards by the Maldivian government. In 1988, he received the General Service Incentive Award for his contributions to the development of businesses in the country. In 1995, Ibrahim received the same award for his contributions to the tourism sector of the country. In 2007, Ibrahim received the National Award of Honour for his contributions to the Maldivian community. In 2013, Ibrahim was awarded the Order of Muleege Dynasty by president Mohamed Waheed Hassan. In 2025, Ibrahim was also awarded the Order of Izzuddin by president Mohamed Muizzu due to Ibrahim's prominent role in developing the political and constitutional role of the country.
