= Speaker of the People's Majlis =

Presiding officer of the People's Majlis of the Maldives

- Emblem of the People's Majlis

- Flag of People's Majlis

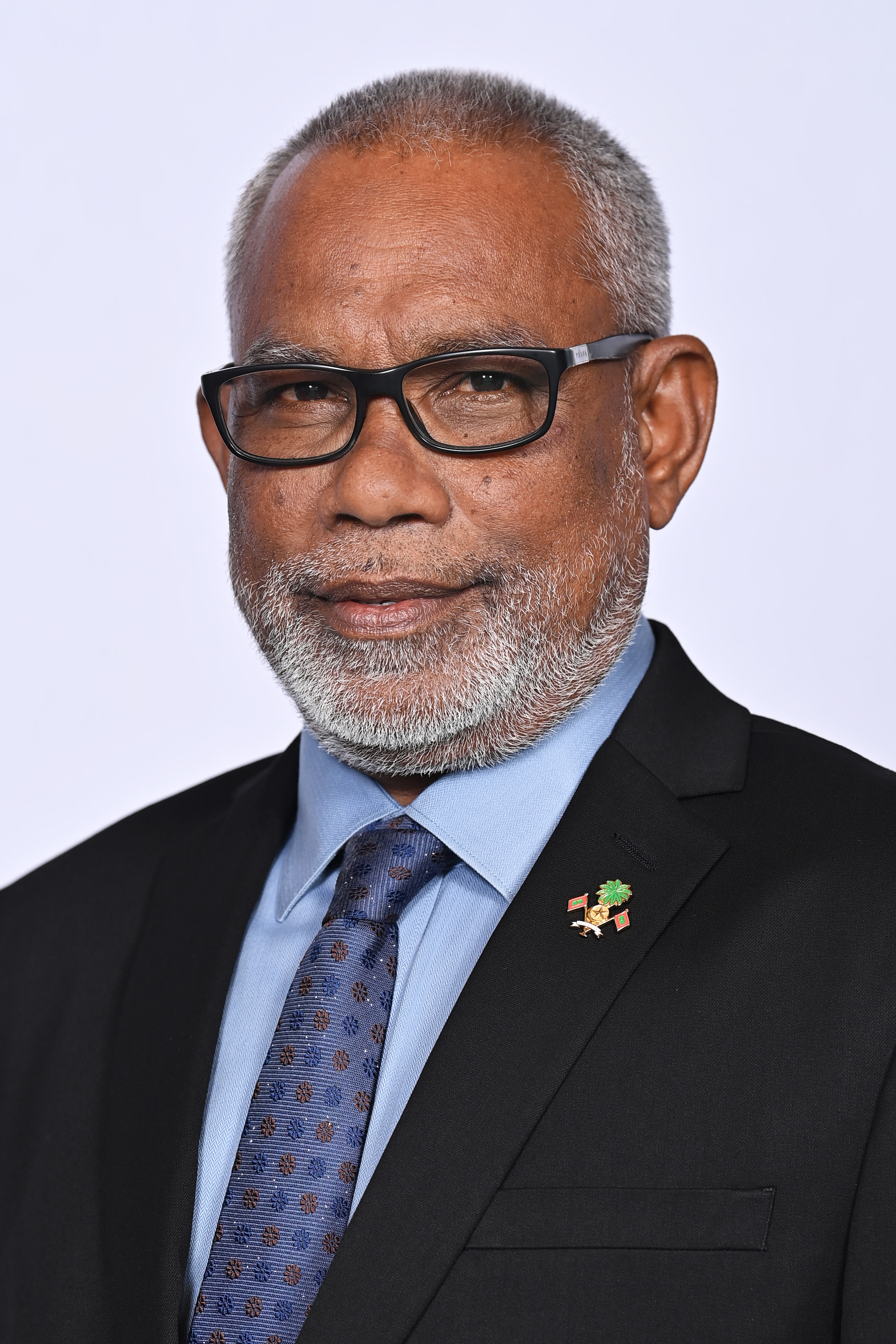
- Incumbent; Abdul Raheem Abdulla since 28 May 2024
- People's Majlis
- Residence: Muraidhooge
- Appointer: Elected among Members
- Term length: 5 years
- Formation: 21 October 1933
- First holder: Muhammad Fareed Didi
- Salary: MVR 90,000
- Website: majlis.gov.mv

The Speaker of the People's Majlis is the presiding officer of the unicameral legislature of the Republic of Maldives, known as the People's Majlis. As the highest-ranking official in the legislature, the Speaker plays a crucial role in overseeing the legislative process, maintaining order during debates, and representing the People's Majlis both domestically and internationally.

Among the Members, a Speaker is elected to oversee the proceedings of the Majlis, ensuring order within the chamber and managing its administrative functions. In the event of a vacancy in the presidency, the Speaker assumes the role of acting president until a new governing body is elected. Additionally, a Deputy Speaker is appointed to support the Speaker and assume leadership of the Majlis in their absence or incapacity to fulfill their duties.

== History ==
King Muhammad Shamsuddeen III established a council tasked with crafting the Constitution of the Maldives on 9 March 1931. After its completion, the constitution was officially put into effect on 22 December 1932. This foundational document paved the way for the inaugural Senate of the-then Sultanate of Maldive Islands, with its gatherings convened at the "Hakura Ganduvaru". Al Ameer Mohammed Farid Didi assumed the role of the first president or speaker of the Senate.

Since the Maldives adopted a multi-party democracy in 2008, the Speaker of the People's Majlis has been a pivotal figure in the country's political scene. They are elected by members of the Majlis and serve as the presiding officer during parliamentary sessions. The Speaker ensures that debates are conducted fairly, rules on procedural matters, and represents the Majlis in official capacities.
