= Gayoom (disambiguation) =

Maumoon Abdul Gayoom is the 3rd president of the Maldives from 1978 to 2008.

Gayoom may also refer to:

== People ==
- Abdul Gayoom Ibrahim, father of Maumoon Abdul Gayoom
- Abdulla Yameen Abdul Gayoom, 6th president of the Maldives from 2013 to 2018

== See also ==
- Maumoon (disambiguation)
- President of the Maldives
