= Yameen (name) =

Yameen is a given name and surname. Notable people with the name include:

- Abdulla Yameen (born 1959), Maldivian politician
- Zeine Abdulla Yameen (fl. from 2023), Maldivian politician, son of Abdulla
- Yameen Rasheed (1988–2017), Maldivian IT professional
- Yameen (fl. from 1995), American hip hop producer
