= Laiba =

Laiba is a given name and surname. Notable people with the name include:

- Laiba Khan (born 1997), Pakistani actress
- Laiba Ahmed Mahloof (born 2013), Maldivian badminton player
- Haotak Laiba, legendary Indian king
