= Ahmed Mahloof =

Maldivian government official (born 1980)

- އަހުމަދު މަހުލޫފު
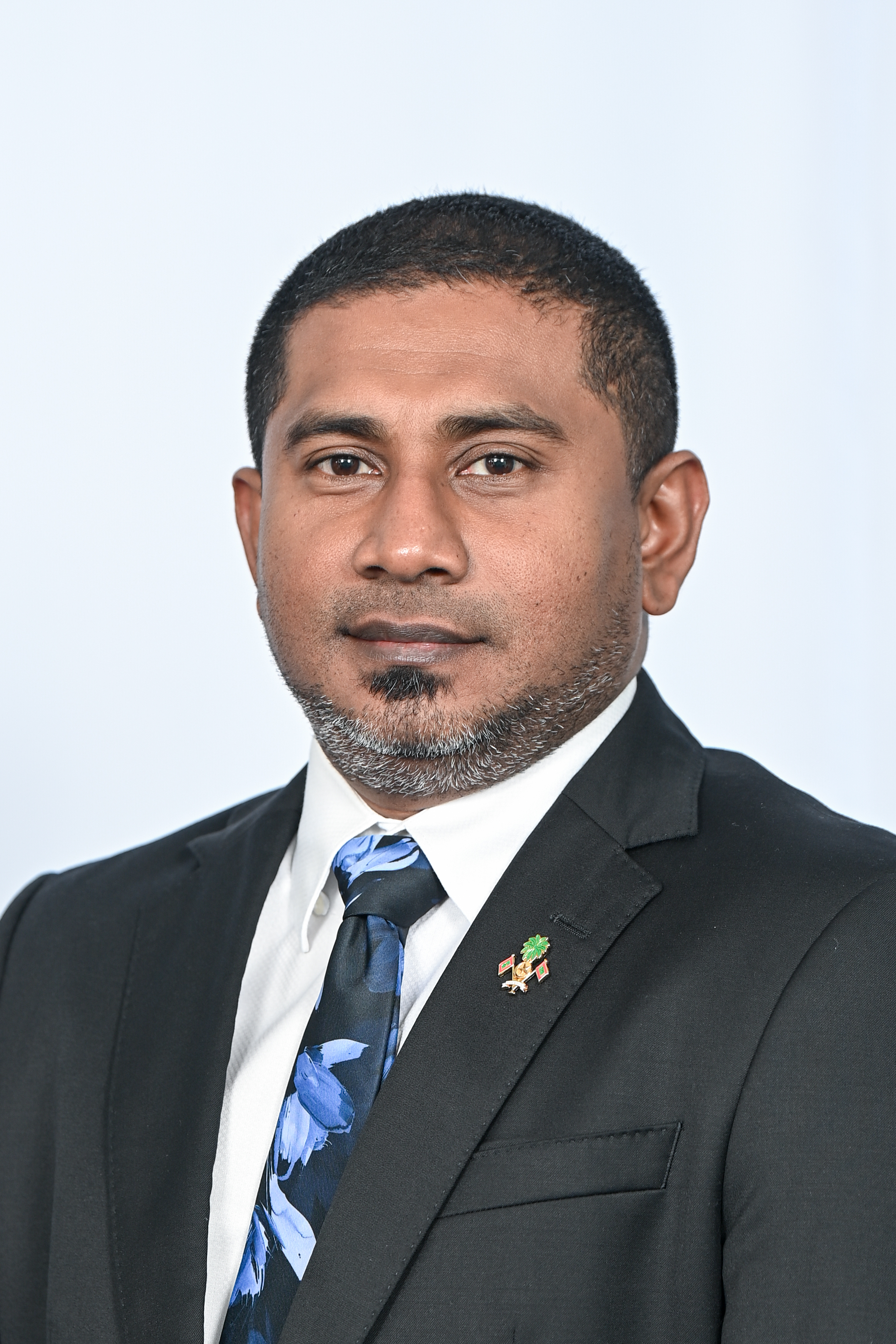
- Official portrait, 2025.

Ambassador of the Maldives to Japan
- Incumbent
- Assumed office 25 May 2026
- President: Mohamed Muizzu
- Preceded by: Hassan Sobir

Minister of Youth, Sports, and Community Empowerment
- In office 17 November 2018 – 17 November 2023
- President: Ibrahim Mohamed Solih
- Preceded by: Iruthisham Adam
- Succeeded by: Abdulla Rafiu

Member of the People's Majlis
- In office 28 May 2014 – 17 November 2018
- President: Abdulla Yameen
- Preceded by: Office established
- Succeeded by: Meekail Ahmed Naseem
- Constituency: South Galolhu

Personal details
- Born: 26 March 1980 (age 46)
- Party: Congress (2025–present)
- Other political affiliations: Maldivian Democratic Party (2018–2025); Independent (2015–2018); Progressive Party of Maldives (2011–2015); Dhivehi Rayyithunge Party (2005–2010)
- Spouse: Nazra Naseem (m. 2010)
- Children: Laiba Ahmed Mahloof
Association football career
Youth career
- Club Valencia
Senior career*
Years	Team	Apps	(Gls)
- Club Valencia
- New Radiant
International career
- Maldives U16
- Maldives U19
- Maldives U23
Managerial career
- 2013–2014: Maldives (manager)
- * Club domestic league appearances and goals

Ahmed Mahloof (Dhivehi: އަހުމަދު މަހުލޫފު; born 26 March 1980) is a Maldivian politician, diplomat, and former footballer who is currently serving as the Ambassador of the Maldives to Japan since 2026. He previously served as the Minister of Youth, Sports, and Community Empowerment from 2018 to 2023. Before that, he served as a Member of the People's Majlis for the South Galolhu constituency from 2014 until his resignation in 2018 to become the Youth Minister.

Mahloof is a former footballer who served as the manager of the Maldives national football team.

== Football career ==
Mahloof's boyhood passion was football. His skills were noticed early, and he went on to represent the country at the under-16, under-19 and under-23 age groups. He also played in the country's premier division for two of the strongest clubs, Club Valencia and New Radiant Sports Club. His aspiration to build a career in sports ended prematurely with a career-ending injury in his youthful prime.

== After football ==
After recovering from the injury, Mahloof worked as the sports supervisor of a local primary school, Iskandhar School. In 2000, he joined the government as an assistant programme officer of the Ministry of Youth and Sports. He served in various capacities at the ministry until his resignation in 2008. When he left government service, he was serving as assistant director.

He also served as the sports supervisor at Madrasathul Ahmadhiyya, another major primary school in Malé and as assistant director at the Maldives Post Limited.

== Politics ==
=== Youth Empowerment Activism ===
Mahloof's achievements include his stint at the United Nations Office for the Coordination of Humanitarian Affairs (UNOCHA), following the devastating 2004 Asian tsunami. In 2007, Mahloof was elected as the vice-chair and in 2008 the chair of the Asian Regional Youth Caucus of the Commonwealth Youth Programme. He was the first Maldivian to serve in that capacity. In 2007, Mahloof was appointed by the Commonwealth Secretary-General to join an elections observer mission to Sierra Leone, for the country's presidential elections. He was the first Maldivian that had served gone overseas for an elections monitoring mission.

==== Dhivehi Rayyithunge Party (DRP) ====
With the arrival of pluralist politics in the Maldives and the subsequent establishment of political parties, Mahloof joined the Dhivehi Rayyithunge Party (DRP), led by the then president, Maumoon Abdul Gayoom. at the party's first national conference, Mahloof was part of the DRP's council.

Recognising his contributions to youth welfare, Maumoon Abdul Gayoom appointed, on 20 January 2008, to the People's Special Majlis, the Constitutional Assembly to draft a new constitution. On 6 August 2008, Mahloof was also appointed to the People's Majlis. He became the youngest Member of Parliament at the time. In 2009, Mahloof contested for the People's Majlis from his neighborhood constituency, the Galolhu South Constituency of Malé.

==== Progressive Party of Maldives (PPM) ====
In 2010, Mahloof found himself at the centre of a controversial rift within the DRP, which would eventually culminate in the founder and leader of the DRP, former president Maumoon Abdul Gayoom and other reformists, including Mahloof, leaving the DRP to form a brand-new political party, the Progressive Party of Maldives (PPM).

In 2014, Mahloof resigned as the spokesperson of PPM.

In 2015, Mahloof was expelled from PPM by its disciplinary committee. He was expelled following alleged false remarks against then president Abdulla Yameen to the media.

==== Maldivian Democratic Party (MDP) ====
Following Mahloof's expulsion from PPM, he worked with the party since 2015. Later on, he officially joined the party in 2018. During his time as a member, he was appointed the Minister of Youth, Sports, and Community Empowerment by Ibrahim Mohamed Solih in November 2018.

In 2025, Mahloof resigned from the MDP.

==== People's National Congress (PNC) ====
On 14 November 2025, during a major People's National Congress's (PNC) rally at Artificial Beach to mark the two-year anniversary of Mohamed Muizzu’s presidency, Mahloof signed the PNC membership form and handed it to President Muizzu. Prior to that, he had submitted his resignation from MDP on 8 September 2025, citing intention to assume a government post. The move marks a return to “his old political ideology,” according to Mahloof.

Soon after, President Muizzu nominated him as the Maldivian Ambassador to Japan, which the People's Majlis approved. In December 2025, President Muizzu appointed him as the Ambassador of the Maldives to Japan. On 25 May 2026, Mahloof presented his credentials to Emperor Naruhito.

== Controversies ==
=== Adeeb conflict ===
In March 2015, Mahloof accused Adeeb of ordering people to break into his house after Adeeb threatened him over the phone. Mahloof had also accused Adeeb of bribery and committing politically motivated attacks using gangs.

=== Jail sentences ===
In March 2015, Mahloof and other journalists were arrested at an opposition march. Opposition MDP condemned Mahloof's arrest claiming that he was targeted by the Yameen government die to his criticism of the government. The Parliamentarians for Global Action (PGA) called for Mahloof's release and expressed its "undiminished solidarity" towards him. In April, he was held for an additional fifteen days after refusing to accept a deal where he'd be unable to attend any protests. He was later released on 12 April following an overturning by the High Court which called the ban 'unconstitutional'.

In June 2015, Mahloof was arrested at an opposition sit-in where he was charged with disobedience to order. Eyewitnesses claimed police officers beat Mahloof. He was released the following day and was questioned at the police headquarters.

In January 2016, the Prosecutor General (PG) charged Mahloof with obstructing police duty for refusing to get into a police vehicle and attempting to flee from the police in April 2015.

In February 2016, Mahloof was questioned by police over claims that president Yameen and first lady Fathimath Ibrahim had millions of dollars in their bank accounts. He was later on summoned to the police again a few days later over him dumping fake dollar bills outside the president's private residence with Eva Abdulla and was later on fined.

In March 2016, Mahloof was arrested inside the Jalaaludheen Mosque for participating in an anti-corruption rally. His arrest was condemned by the MDP. The PG declined to press charges against Mahloof for that.

In April 2016, Mahloof plead not guilty regarding his March 2015 arrest.

In July 2016, Mahloof was arrested while he was promoting the Maldives United Opposition's rally and was sentenced to four months in jail. MDP condemned his arrest and opposition MPs protested in the Majlis calling for his release. A week later, Mahloof was sentenced to six months in jail for his actions in March 2015. Mahloof's case had been sent to the Working Group on Arbitrary Detention by his family, lawyer, and local NGO Maldives Democracy Network on his behalf to challenge the legality of his conviction.

In November 2016, it was revealed that Mahloof's health was deteriorating in jail. His wife, Nazra Naseem, reported that he can't move an arm and has skin allergies, blurry eyesight and a stiff neck. She also accused the Maldives Correction Service (MCS) of failing to provide Mahloof with health care. The Inter-Parliamentary Union (IPU) called on Maldivian authorities to transfer Mahloof to house arrest in light of his health and said it "fails to understand the justification for his conviction and sentence". Mahloof was later able to go to India for medical treatment in December 2016 and February 2017.

In April 2017, Mahloof's weekly phone calls or family and conjugal visits were disallowed by the MCS due to him “threatening national security” by urging parliamentarians to vote in favour of the no confidence motion against Majlis speaker Abdulla Maseeh Mohamed. His privileges were later restored.

In June, Mahloof completed his sentence and was released. A few days later, the Working Group on Arbitrary Detention found Mahloof's jailing as arbitrary and illegal.

In August, Mahloof was placed under a travel ban based on secret intelligence that he was planning to flee. Mahloof was later arrested at a march for abducted journalist Ahmed Rilwan.

In October, Mahloof's passport was revoked while he was in Sri Lanka for medical treatment.

In February 2018, Mahloof was carried out of the Majlis chamber by army officials during the 2018 Maldives political crisis.

In March, Mahloof was detained for leading opposition nightly protests.

In April, Mahloof was released to house arrest and the PGA condemned his detention. Mahloof pleaded not guilty to false reporting to law enforcement over a tweet he made about deaths of immates in Maafushi Prison. Mahloof was later declared a prisoner of conscience by Amnesty International. He was later acquitted in November.

=== Corruption charges ===
During Mahloof's tenure as Minister of Youth, Sports, and Community Empowerment, he was suspended in 2019 following the release of a report which showed Mahloof received money in large sums relating to the Maldives Marketing and Public Relations Corporation scandal. He suspension was later lifted after the Anti-Corruption Commission (ACC) cleared him of any involvement.

In June 2021, president Ibrahim Mohamed Solih re-suspended Mahloof again following a bribery case against him being sent for prosecution. His suspension was later lifted in October following a change in policy by the President's Office where officials will only be suspended after charges are formally presented.

Mahloof alleged that he was embroiled in a political conspiracy by a group of politicians to oust him as minister.

In November, the Prosecutor General's Office (PGO) charged Mahloof with accepting a bribe. The ACC found that Ahmed Adeeb paid Mahloof 32,000 dollars to keep remaining as a member of PPM and to vote for a special economic zone bill in 2014. Mahloof's trial was set to begin when the COVID-19 situation in the Maldives improves. The PGO and Transparency Maldives criticised this decision. His hearing was scheduled to February 2022. Mahloof plead not guilty to the charges. In March, the Criminal Court dropped charges against him due to lack of evidence.

The PGO later appealed this decision to the High Court where it was later accepted. The court concluded hearings and reversed the Criminal Court's order to dismiss the case. The PG requested the Criminal Court to hold trials against Mahloof in September. In April 2023, the PGO dropped the corruption charges against Mahloof.

== Awards ==
Mahloof was awarded the 2018 Defender of Democracy Award by the Parliamentarians for Global Action.

== Extracurricular activities ==
In addition to his love for sport, and in particular football, he also earned a reputation as a vocalist. His talents were acknowledged by a wide audience following his songs at the popular Ehandhaanugai and Tharinge Rey shows.

== Football management ==
On 17 November 2013, Mahloof assumed charge of the Maldives national football team, the "Red Snappers", as the team's Manager.
