= Abbas Shareef =

Prosecutor General of the Maldives since 2024

- ޢައްބާސް ޝަރީފް
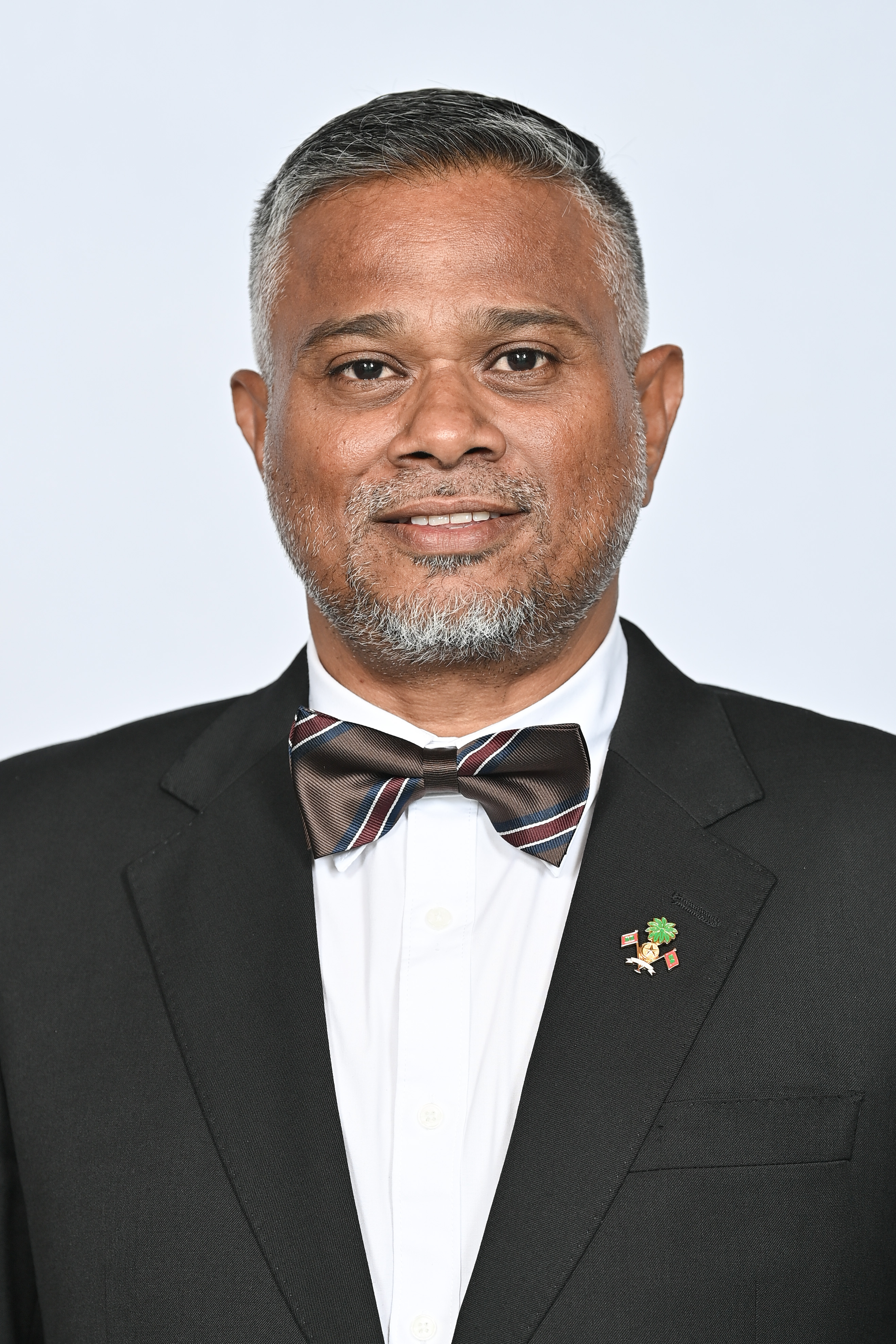
- Official portrait, 2023

5th Prosecutor General of the Maldives
- Incumbent
- Assumed office 18 September 2024
- President: Mohamed Muizzu
- Preceded by: Hussain Shameem

Secretary to the President on Legal Affairs
- In office 17 November 2023 – 18 September 2024
- President: Mohamed Muizzu
- Preceded by: Post established

Judge at the High Court of the Maldives
- In office 26 March 2011 – 1 October 2015
- President: Mohamed Nasheed; Mohamed Waheed Hassan; Abdulla Yameen

Personal details
- Born: Malé, Maldives
- Party: Unaffiliated
- Education: University of Tasmania (LL.B)
- Website: pgoffice.gov.mv

Abbas Shareef (Dhivehi: ޢައްބާސް ޝަރީފް; born 19??) is a Maldivian lawyer who is currently serving as Prosecutor General since September 2024 and had previously served as the Secretary to the President on Legal Affairs under president Mohamed Muizzu and a Judge at the High Court of the Maldives from March 2011 to October 2015.

== Early life and education ==
Abbas Shareef was born in Malé, Maldives. He studied Bachelor of Laws at the Australian University of Tasmania in 2000.

== Career ==
Shareef was appointed a Judge at the High Court of the Maldives by then-president Mohamed Nasheed on 26 March 2011. Prior to his appointment as a High Court judge, he held positions such as Assistant Legal Officer, Legal Officer and Assistant Director General at the President's Office. He further served as a member of the Judicial Service Commission appointed by the President, Deputy President of the Judicial Service Commission and Vice President of the Appeals Committee of the Football Association of Maldives. On 22 June 2015, Shareef along with Azmiralda Zahir and Shuaib Hussain Zakariyya were transferred to the southern branch of the appellate court. In October 2015, Shareef retired as a High Court judge.

Shareef was appointed as Secretary to the President on Legal Affairs on 17 November 2023.

On 12 September 2024, following the resignation of Hussain Shameem, President Mohamed Muizzu submitted the name of Shareef to the People's Majlis for parliamentary approval to appoint him as the Prosecutor General of the Maldives. Shareef was approved by the parliament on 16 September 2024. On 18 September 2024, Abbas was appointed as the Prosecutor General by President Mohamed Muizzu.
