= Aishath Bisam =

Maldivian jurist and lawyer

- ޢާއިޝަތު ބިޝާމް
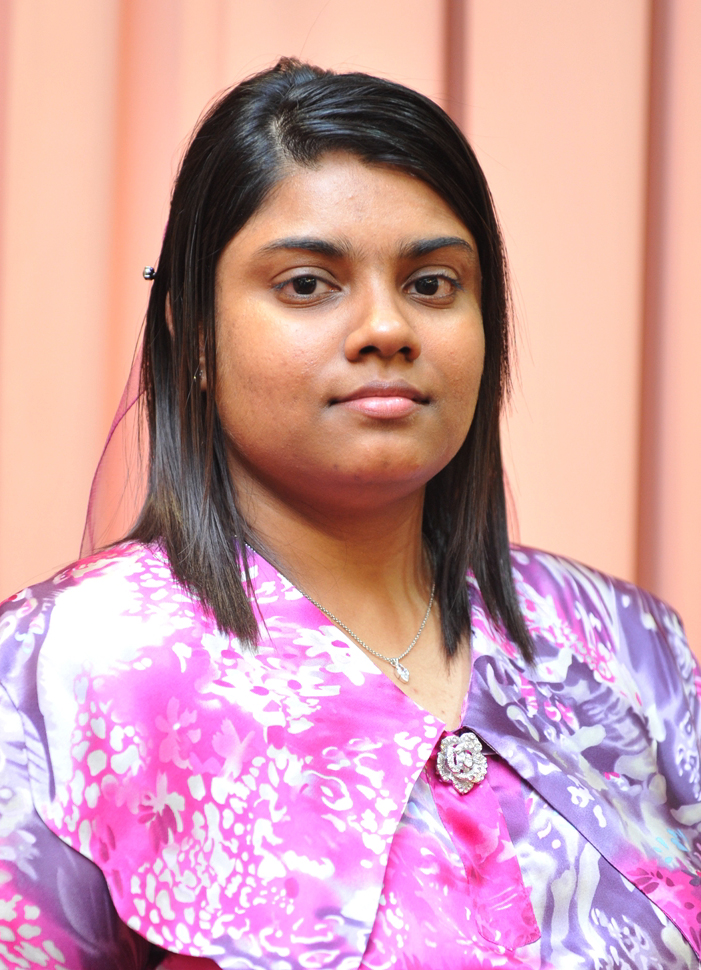
- Bisam in 2013

Prosecutor General of the Maldives
- In office 23 November 2015 – 28 November 2019
- President: Abdulla Yameen; Ibrahim Mohamed Solih
- Preceded by: Muhthaz Muhsin
- Succeeded by: Hussain Shameem

Attorney General
- In office 10 April 2013 – 1 July 2013
- President: Mohamed Waheed Hassan
- Preceded by: Aishath Azima Shakoor
- Succeeded by: Aishath Azima Shakoor

Aishath Bisam (Dhivehi: ޢާއިޝަތު ބިޝާމް; also spelled as Bisham) is a Maldivian jurist and lawyer who served as the prosecutor general of the Maldives from 2015 to 2019. She had previously served as the Attorney General of the Maldives in 2013.

== Career ==
Bisam started her judicial career after being appointed as Deputy Solicitor General at the Attorney General's Office in March 2011 by President Mohamed Nasheed. In March 2012, she was appointed as the Deputy Attorney General by President Mohamed Waheed Hassan.

On 10 April 2013, President Waheed appointed Bisam as the Attorney General. She was part of the Committee for the Protection of People with Special Needs and the Board of National Drug Agency. Bisam was to be appointed as the Minister of Home Affairs after the People's Majlis did not consent to her appointment as the Attorney General but was postponed.

In July 2013, President Waheed appointed Bisam as the special advisor to the president. On November 2013, Bisam was appointed as the Legal Affairs Secretary at the President's Office. In November 2015, President Abdulla Yameen nominated Bisam as the Prosecutor General, which the Majlis approved. She was later appointed. In February 2018, opposition MPs submitted a motion of no confidence against Bisam for delaying the enforcement of the Supreme Court decision in April to release nine political prisoners, which was later withdrawn. In November 2019, Bisam resigned as the Prosecutor General.
