= Hala Hameed =

Maldivian politician and diplomat (born 1963)

- ހާލާ ޙަމީދު
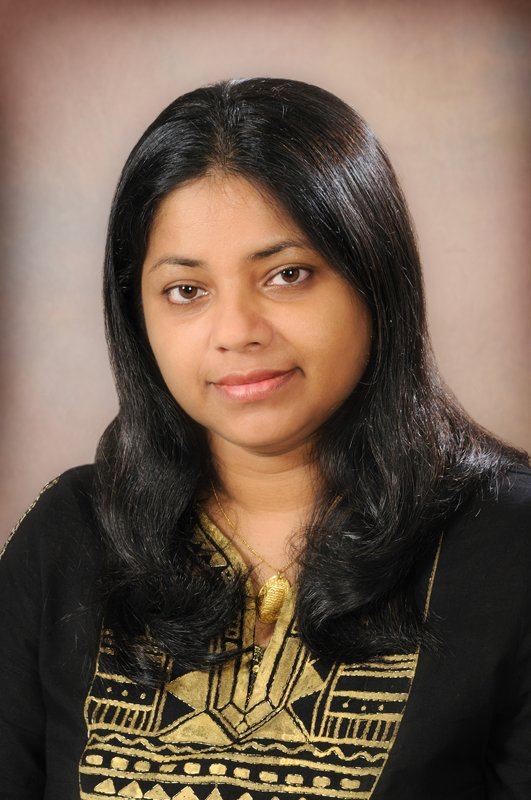
- Official portrait, 2013

Permanent Representative of the Republic of Maldives to the United Nations Office and International Organisations in Geneva
- In office January 2016 – July 2020
- President: Abdulla Yameen; Ibrahim Mohamed Solih
- Preceded by: Ahmed Sareer
- Succeeded by: Salma Rasheed

Minister of State for Law and Gender
- In office 1 July 2014 – August 2015
- President: Abdulla Yameen

Minister of State for Health and Gender
- In office December 2013 – 1 July 2014
- President: Abdulla Yameen
- Succeeded by: Herself as State Minister for Law and Gender

Vice President of the Police Integrity Commission
- In office 18 November 2012 – December 2013
- Appointed by: Mohamed Waheed
- President: Abdulla Waheed

Personal details
- Born: 6 November 1963 (age 62)
- Spouse: Abdul Ghafoor Yoosuf
- Relations: Gayoom family
- Children: 3
- Parent: Abdulla Hameed (father)
- Education: American University of Beirut; University of the South Pacific (BA); University of East Anglia (MPhil, PhD)

Hala Hameed (Dhivehi: ހާލާ ޙަމީދު; born 6 November 1963) is a Maldivian politician and diplomat who has been heading the Bilateral Department at the Ministry of Foreign Affairs since August 2022.

== Career ==
She was first the Vice President of the Police Integrity Commission from December 2012 to December 2013 but resigned to serve as Minister of State for Health and Gender from December 2013 to July 2014. She served as the Minister of State for Law and Gender from July 2014 to August 2015. In October 2015, she was appointed as the Ambassador-at-Large at the Ministry of Foreign Affairs. She was the Permanent Representative of the Maldives to the United Nations Office at Geneva from January 2016 to July 2020.

== Education ==
She was educated at the American University of Beirut, the University of the South Pacific (BA, 1989), and the University of East Anglia (MPhil, 1993; PhD, 2004). Her PhD was entitled "Understanding gender and intra-household relations: a case study of Shaviyani Atoll, Maldives". She received the government's special award for completing her PhD.

== Family ==
She is the daughter of Abdulla Hameed, and the niece of Abdulla Yameen and Maumoon Abdul Gayoom. Hameed is married to Abdul Ghafoor Yoosuf and she has three children.
