= Ahmed Musthafa Mohamed =

Maldivian politician

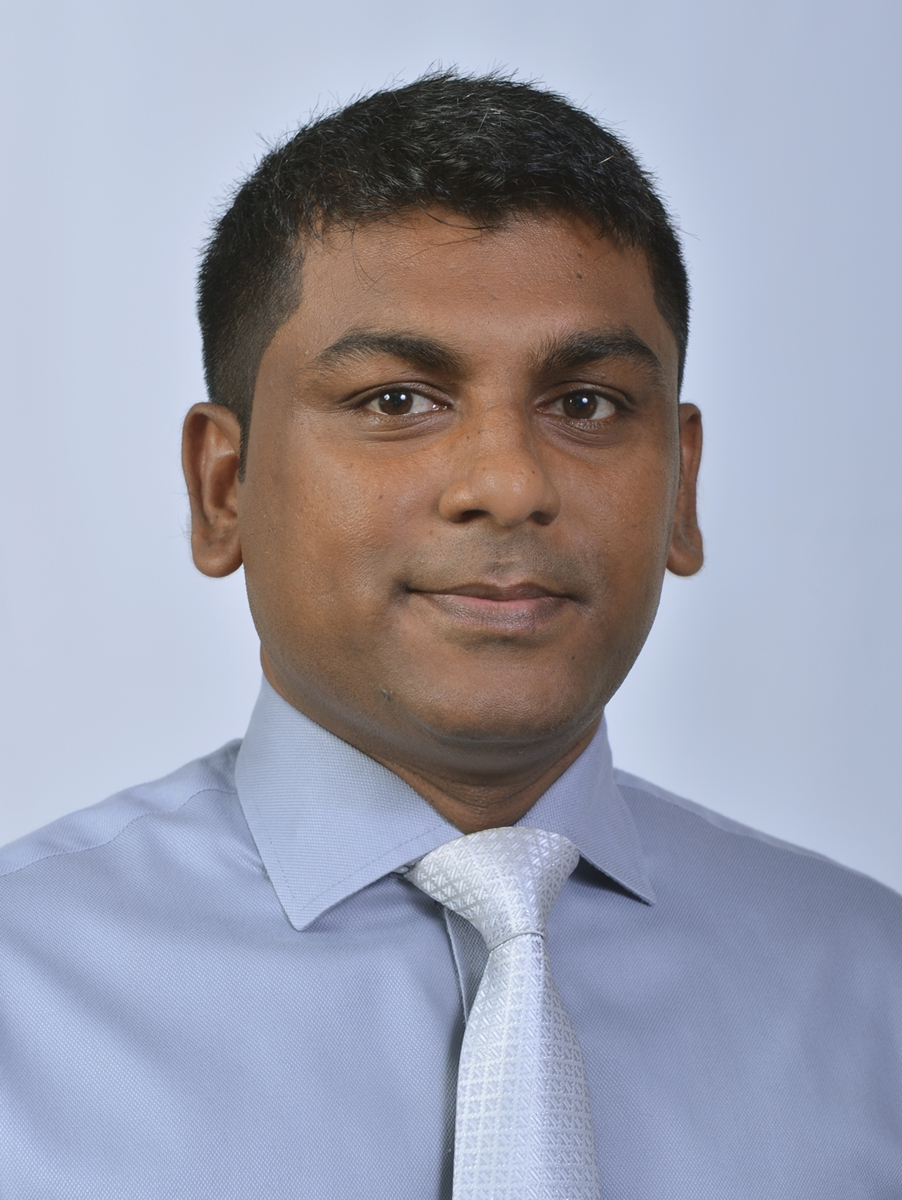
- Official portrait, 2014

Chief of Staff at The President's Office
- In office 24 April 2014 – 17 November 2018
- President: Abdulla Yameen Abdul Gayoom
- Preceded by: Dr Mohamed Ali
- Succeeded by: Ali Zahir

Minister of State for Tourism
- In office 5 December 2013 – 24 April 2014
- President: Abdulla Yameen Abdul Gayoom
- Preceded by: Ahmed Shameem
- Succeeded by: Ahmed Solih

Deputy Minister of Environment and Energy
- In office 2013 – 5 December 2013
- President: Mohamed Waheed Hassan Manik
- Preceded by: Position established
- Succeeded by: Abdulla Hameed

Personal details
- Born: Malé, Maldives
- Party: People's National Front (2024–present)
- Other political affiliations: Progressive Party of Maldives; People's National Congress
- Profession: Politician

Ahmed Musthafa Mohamed is a Maldivian politician who served as the Chief of Staff at the President's Office from 2014 to 2018. He also served as a council member of the Progressive Party of Maldives and Peoples National Congress. He's one of the founding members of the People's National Front.

== Career ==
He was appointed as the Deputy Minister of Environment and Energy during the presidency of Mohamed Waheed Hassan in 2013. He later assumed the role of State Minister of Tourism on 5 December 2013 during the presidency of Abdulla Yameen Abdul Gayoom. He was then appointed as the Chief of Staff at the President's Office on 24 April 2014 presumably until the end of President Yameen's term. He was later arrested on 9 February 2019 for accepting bribes while leasing an island up for tourism and was remanded for 10 days. He is also a founder member of Yameen's political party, People's National Front.
