= Nazra Naseem =

Maldivian politician (born 1989)

- ނަޛްރާ ނަސީމް
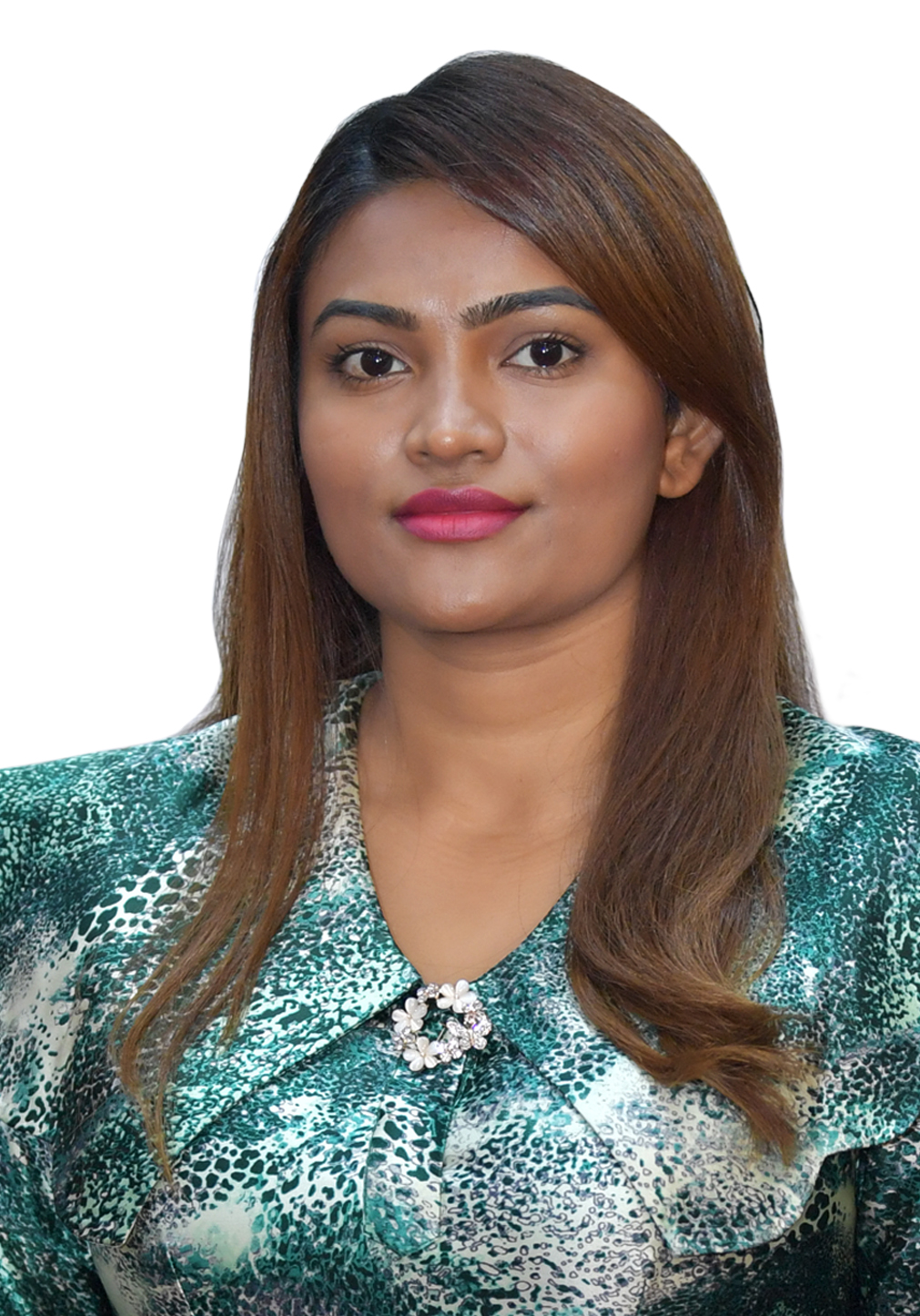
- Official portrait, 2018

Chief Executive to Vice President
- In office 22 November 2018 – 17 November 2023
- Vice President: Faisal Naseem

Personal details
- Born: 3 May 1989 (age 37)
- Spouse: Ahmed Mahloof (m. 2010)
- Relations: Faisal Naseem (brother)
- Children: Laiba Ahmed Mahloof

Nazra Naseem (Dhivehi: ނަޛްރާ ނަސީމް; born 3 May 1989), also known as Nazu Naseem, is a Maldivian politician who served as the Chief Executive to Vice President from 2018 to 2023.

== Career ==
Naseem started actively engaged in politics when her husband Ahmed Mahloof was jailed. Naseem was later appointed in 2018 as the Chief Executive to Vice President (secretary) to her brother, Faisal Naseem, in 2018.

Naseem ran in the 2024 Maldivian parliamentary elections for the South Fuvahmulah constituency on behalf of the Maldivian Democratic Party and was endorsed by the People's National Front. Her husband, Ahmed Mahloof, accused her brother Faisal Naseem, of anti-campaigning against Naseem and called his family to not vote for his sister. Faisal denied this.

== Personal life ==
Naseem is married to Ahmed Mahloof and their child is Laiba Ahmed Mahloof.
