= Hamdhoon Hameed =

Maldivian politician and diplomat

- ޙަމްދޫން ޙަމީދު
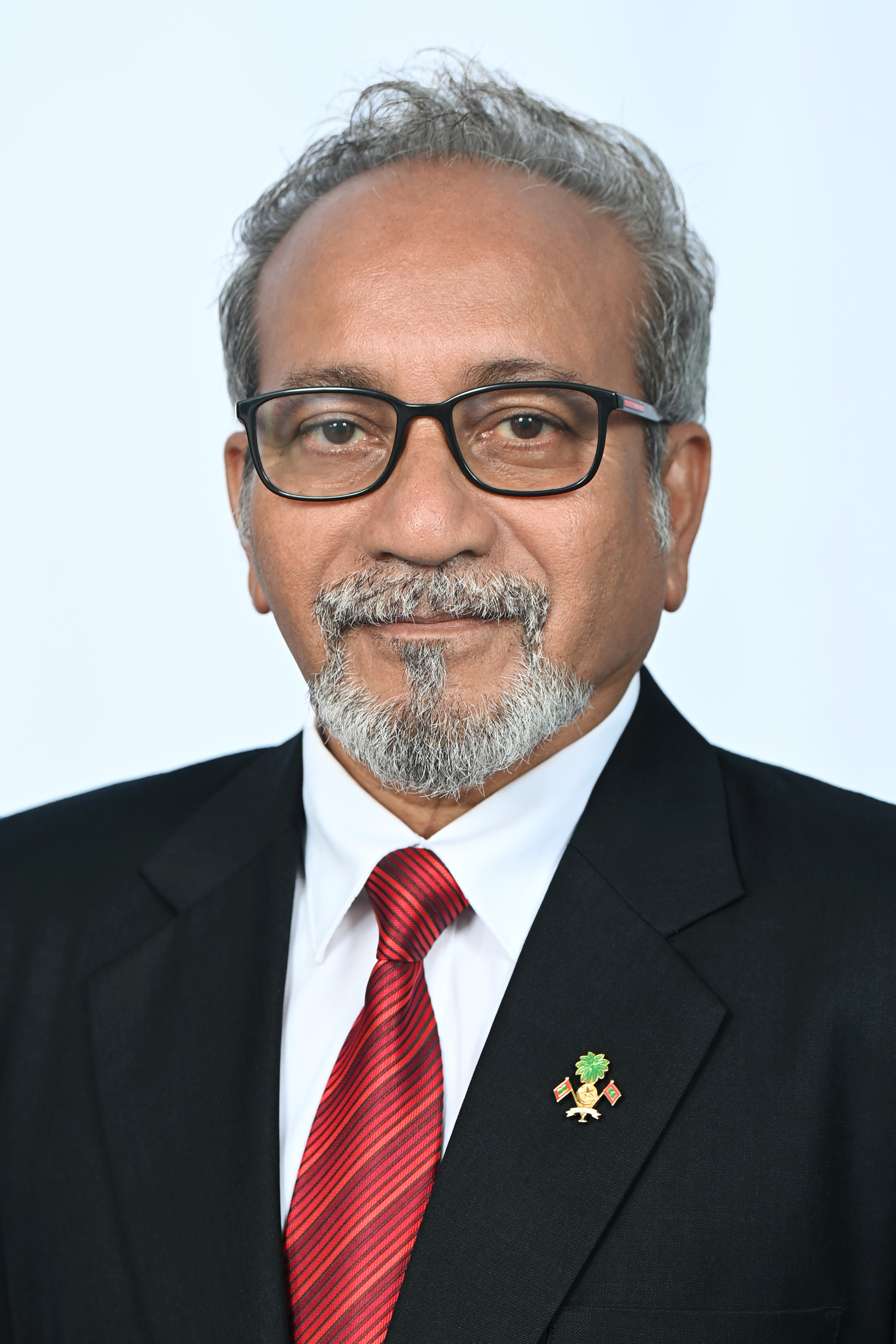
- Official portrait, 2025.

Advisor on National Planning
- Incumbent
- Assumed office 2025
- President: Mohamed Muizzu

Ambassador of the Maldives to Singapore
- In office 30 March 2017 – 2018
- Appointed by: Abdulla Yameen
- Succeeded by: Abdulla Mausoom

Member of the People's Majlis
- In office 28 May 2009 – 28 May 2014
- Succeeded by: Ibrahim Falah
- Constituency: Inguraidhoo

Minister of Planning and National Development
- In office 2003–2008
- President: Maumoon Abdul Gayoom

Personal details
- Born: Hamdhoon Abdulla Hameed
- Other political affiliations: Dhivehi Rayyithunge Party
- Relations: Gayoom family
- Parent: Abdulla Hameed
- Education: American University of Beirut (BA)

Hamdhoon Abdulla Hameed (Dhivehi: ޙަމްދޫން ޢަބްދުﷲ ޙަމީދު) is a Maldivian politician and diplomat who served as the Non-Resident Ambassador of the Maldives to Singapore from 2017 to 2018. He also served as the Minister of Planning and National Development from 2003 to 2008. A member of the Gayoom family, he's the son of Abdulla Hameed.

== Education ==
He has a Bachelor of Arts in Economics from the American University of Beirut.

== Career ==
Hamdhoon was appointed as the Minister of Planning and National Development under the presidency of his uncle Maumoon Abdul Gayoom from 2003 to 2008. He also served as the Member of the People's Majlis representing the Inguraidhoo constituency. In 2016, he was appointed by his uncle Abdulla Yameen as the Ambassador of the Maldives to Singapore. He continued serving the role until 2018. In 2025, he was appointed as an advisor to the Minister of Finance and Plnaning.

== Awards ==
Hamdhoon received the Public Service Award in the field of Dhivehi poetry in the year 1997.
