= Hussain Shameem =

Prosecutor General of the Maldives from 2019 to 2024

- ހުސެއިން ޝަމީމު
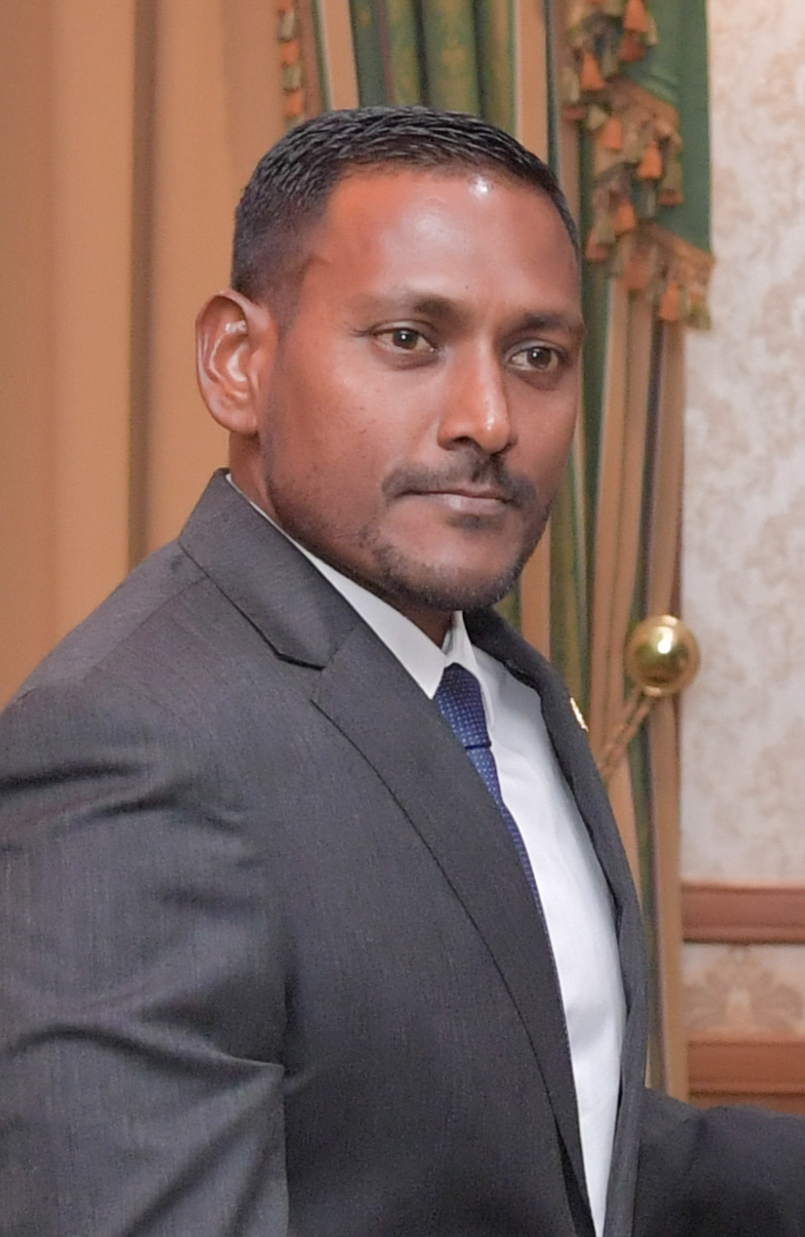
- Shameem in 2019

4th Prosecutor General of the Maldives
- In office 8 December 2019 – 22 August 2024
- President: Ibrahim Mohamed Solih; Mohamed Muizzu
- Preceded by: Aishath Bisam
- Succeeded by: Abbas Shareef

Personal details
- Party: Unaffiliated
- Education: University of Sussex (LLM); Al-Azhar University (B.A.)

Hussain Shameem (Dhivehi: ހުސެއިން ޝަމީމު) is a Maldivian lawyer who served as the Prosecutor General of the Maldives from December 2019 until his resignation on 22 August 2024.

== Career ==
Shameem was first a member of the Clemency Board during the Nasheed administration.

=== Prosecutor Generalship ===
President Ibrahim Mohamed Solih sent his name for nomination for Prosecutor General (PG) to the People's Majlis (parliament) for approval after the previous PG, Aishath Bisam, resigned. On 8 December 2019, Shameem was appointed as Prosecutor General.

On 31 January 2024, Shameem was taking a walk around Malé near Noor Mosque where he was attacked by an individual with a hammer. He received treatment from ADK Hospital. His attack was condemned by many organizations, notably the International Association of Prosecutors, Maldivian Democratic Party (MDP), Jumhooree Party (JP), The Democrats, Progressive Party of Maldives (PPM) and People's National Congress. Two people were arrested in connection to his attack.

On 13 August 2024, Hulhudhoo MP Mohamed Shahid submitted a motion to the Parliament's Judiciary Committee to dismiss Shameem from his role as Prosecutor General. The charges against Shameem are, filing a sexual assault case against ex-Tourism Minister Ali Waheed, filing corruption case against former Sports Minister Ahmed Mahloof, deciding not to appeal a lower court's 2020 rape case known as the "Safari rape case" due to a person being connected to the MDP, withdrawing trafficking charges against former Milandhoo MP Ali Riza, dropping charges in 77 cases of alcohol consumption, dropping charges in 13 cases of same-sex relations, refusing to look into allegations of same-sex relations, drug abuse and mockery of Prophet Mohamed against Ahmed Shafeeu, the chief spokesperson of the Prosecutor General's Office, not pursuing charges against the ventilator corruption case. On 22 August 2024, Shameem resigned as Prosecutor General.

== Education ==
Shameem holds a LL.M. in Criminal law and justice from the University of Sussex, as well as a B.A. in Sharia and Law from Al-Azhar University.
