= Zeine Abdulla Yameen =

Maldivian politician

- ޒޭން ޢަބްދުﷲ ޔާމީން
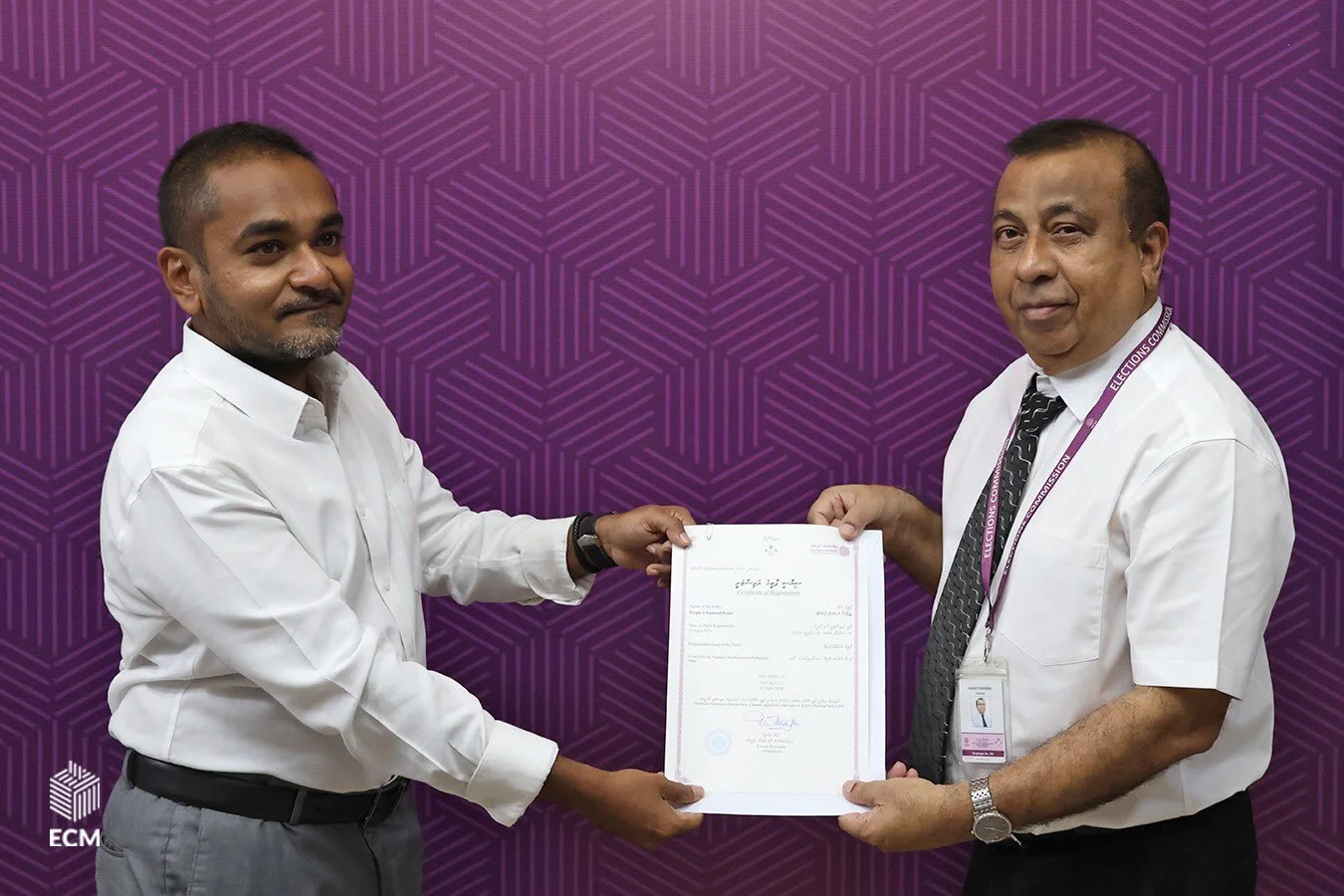
- Zeine (left) in 2024

Vice President of the People's National Front
- Incumbent
- Assumed office 30 October 2025
- President: Abdulla Yameen

Personal details
- Party: People's National Front (2023–present)
- Relations: Gayoom family
- Children: 1
- Parents: Abdulla Yameen (father); Fathimath Ibrahim (mother)

Zeine Abdulla Yameen (/zeɪn/; also spelled Zain or Zein; Dhivehi: ޒޭން ޢަބްދުﷲ ޔާމީން) is a Maldivian politician who has served as the vice president of the People's National Front since 2025. A member of the Gayoom family, Yameen is the son of former President Abdulla Yameen Abdul Gayoom and First Lady Fathimath Ibrahim.

Yameen became the founder of the People's National Front in November 2023 following his father Gayoom's split from the Progressive Party of Maldives. In 2025, Yameen was elected as the vice president of the PNF alongside Mohamed Jameel Ahmed.

== Early life and background ==
Zeine Abdulla Yameen was born to former President Abdulla Yameen Abdul Gayoom and former First Lady Fathimath Ibrahim. He is the eldest son of Abdulla Yameen.

== Political activism ==
Yameen had attention on him in 2019 when he called former Youth and Sports minister Ahmed Mahloof a stealer (Dhivehi: ވަގަށް), in response Mahloof stated that Yameen should call his father, Abdulla Yameen, that. Yameen gained political attention during the imprisonment of his father, Abdulla Yameen Abdul Gayoom, since he used Zeine to convey Eid greetings from prison.

He also made public statements regarding his father's legal proceedings and detention conditions. Yameen alleged that state authorities were restricting his father's ability to appeal, including by withholding court documents required for legal processes. His father alleged that the ruling coalition sought to have his spouse and son attend protests calling for his release in order to facilitate their arrest.

Yameen has also acted as a spokesperson for his family during the legal proceedings faced by his father. He accused the government officials of trying to meddle in the legal proceeding as well as prevent his father, Abdulla Yameen from receiving proper legal or medical aid.

In January 2023, Yameen represented a delegation from the Progressive Congress Coalition in a meeting with European Union ambassadors in Colombo, Sri Lanka, where the group raised concerns about the imprisonment of former President Abdulla Yameen and alleged that the trial and sentence were unjust. He participated as a representative alongside other senior figures.

== Political career ==
After Abdulla Yameen split from the Progressive Party of Maldives amid tightening tensions between his father and Muizzu, Ibrahim Shujau alleged that he left after Muizzu denied giving Zeine Tourism Minister's post.

In an interview with Channel 13, Yameen stated that he supports reforms to increase private sector investment in the Maldives economy.

Following legal challenges involving his father, whose convictions on bribery and money laundering charges, Yameen became a founder of the People's National Front (PNF), a political party registered with the Elections Commission of the Maldives in 2024. After the party's registration, Yameen served as the interim leader of the People's National Front.

During the early activities of the People's National Front, Yameen publicly criticised the presidency of Mohamed Muizzu, stating that the change brought by Muizzu's administration had not been positive. After a PNF rally that was initially obstructed by authorities, Yameen spoke to local media and said he did not believe the change under Muizzu was beneficial, emphasising that the party intended to be inclusive and open to all members of society.

In October 2025, following his release from legal restrictions and acquittal in related cases, Abdulla Yameen Abdul Gayoom was elected unopposed as president of the People's National Front, while he served as one of the party's vice presidents alongside Dr. Mohamed Jameel Ahmed.
