= Yaiphurakpa =

Yaiphurakpa (ꯌꯥꯏꯐꯨꯔꯥꯛꯄ), also known as Yaphurakpa (ꯌꯥꯐꯨꯔꯥꯛꯄ), was a warrior king of Chairen group of people in ancient Kangleipak (early Manipur). He is notably mentioned in the classical Meitei literary work Chainarol ("An Account of Combats"). He is remembered for his martial skill, sense of honour, and a celebrated duel with Haotak Laiba, the contemporary king of Khende group of people. Yaiphurakpa is remembered as a paragon of chivalry, self-restraint, and valor in ancient Meitei literature. His story shows the warrior ethos of ancient Meitei civilisation, where personal honour was often considered more important than vengeance or rigid adherence to violent customs. His duel is one of the few in the Chainarol that ends without death, marking it as an exceptional tale of honour over violence.

== Duel with Haotak Laiba ==
The most well documented account involving Yaiphurakpa is his duel with Haotak Laiba, ruler of the Khende clan. Their conflict originated from a misunderstanding and jealousy.

Initially, they had a very good friendship. During a hunting event, Haotak Laiba's wife hosted Yaiphurakpa with lavish hospitality, serving rich food and abundant wine. As a return gesture, the following year, Yaiphurakpa reciprocated with an even more generous feast. There came a rising tension as a consequence. Haotak Laiba, driven by suspicion and jealousy, accused Yaiphurakpa of improper illicit relationship with his wife. Yaphurakpa denied the accusations. Thereafter, a duel challenge was proposed. To resolve the matter with honour, they agreed to a one-on-one archery duel at Lawai Ponbikhok Chairen Theichang Poong, a designated combat ground.

=== Outcome ===
Haotak Laiba shot first but missed, his arrow landing in the marshes. Yaiphurakpa followed with a precise shot that struck Haotak Laiba in the thigh. Though victorious and entitled to claim his rival's head as per the warrior code, Yaiphurakpa was moved by their past friendship and spared Haotak Laiba's life. The two reconciled and returned home after sharing drinks, showing a blend of martial integrity and compassion.

== See also ==
- Meitei confederacy
- Meitei warrior traditions
- Khuman warrior traditions
- Meitei martial arts
- Meitei traditional weapons
- Khuman kingdom
- Moirang kingdom
- Khuman Kangleirol
- Moirang Kangleirol
