= Abdulla Hameed =

Maldivian politician (1939–2015)

Abdulla Hameed NIIV
- ޢަބްދުﷲ ޙަމީދު
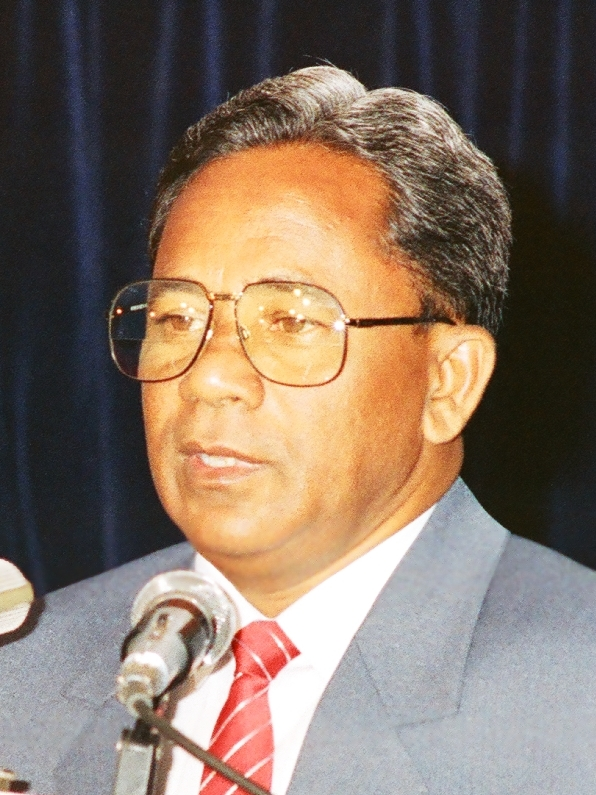

Speaker of the People's Majlis
- In office 11 November 1993 – 13 September 2004
- President: Maumoon Abdul Gayoom
- Deputy: Abdul Rasheed Hussain
- Preceded by: Ibrahim Shihab
- Succeeded by: Ahmed Zaki
- In office 14 February 1988 – 22 February 1990
- President: Maumoon Abdul Gayoom
- Preceded by: Ahmed Zaki
- Succeeded by: Ahmed Zahir

Minister of Education
- In office 30 May 1990 – 11 November 1993
- President: Maumoon Abdul Gayoom
- Preceded by: Mohamed Zahir Hussain
- Succeeded by: Mohamed Latheef

Personal details
- Born: 31 March 1939
- Died: 18 August 2015 (aged 76) Bangalore, India
- Resting place: Galolhu Cemetery, Galolhu, Malé, Maldives
- Relations: Gayoom family
- Children: 12, including Hala and Hamdhoon
- Parent: Abdul Gayoom Ibrahim

Abdulla Hameed, NIIV (31 March 1939 – 18 August 2015) was a Maldivian politician. He was the Minister of Atolls during the administration of his brother Maumoon Abdul Gayoom. Hameed was the Speaker of the Majlis from 1988 to 1990 and again from 1993 to 2004. He was a recipient of the Order of Distinguished Rule of Izzuddeen.

== 1982 speech ==
On 26 July 1982, at a celebration of Maldivian Independence Day, Hameed gave a public speech in which he claimed that Minicoy Island was part of the Maldives. Hameed was the Minister of Atolls at the time and his speech was interpreted as an official claim over the island. The speech caused a minor diplomatic crisis between India and the Maldives, because the two countries had agreed to a maritime boundary treaty whereby Minicoy was placed on the Indian side of the boundary. President Gayoom hurriedly clarified that Hameed's speech was intended to highlight the linguistic, cultural, and religious ties between the Maldives and Minicoy and that the Maldives was not intending to make a political claim over the atoll.

== Sought on corruption charges ==
In September 2011, the Criminal Court of the Maldives ordered the police to summon Hameed to the Maldives to face charges of corruption stemming from his time in public office. The order was a follow-up to the April 2011 request of the Court for the police to locate Hameed, who as of 2011 was believed to reside in Sri Lanka.

== Death ==
Hameed died on 18 August 2015 in Bangalore while receiving treatment for heart failure. He was given a state funeral. The national flag was flown on half mast for three days following his death. The funeral prayer was held in Masjid-ul Sultan Mohamed Thakurufaanu-al Auzam after Isha prayer, the prayer was led by Gayoom. He was buried in Galolhu Cemetery on 20 August 2015.
