= People's National Front =

Political party in the Maldives

People's National Front ޕީޕަލްސް ނެޝެނަލް ފްރޮންޓް
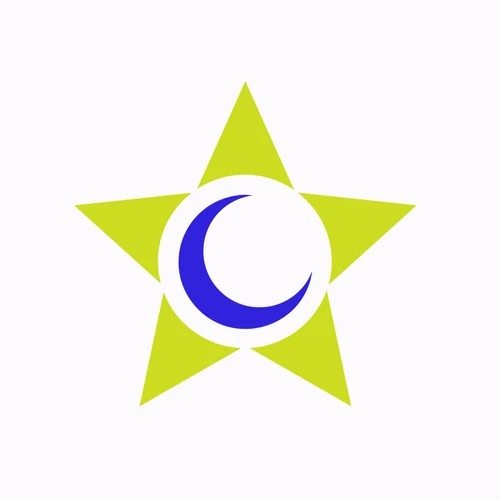
- Abbreviation: PNF
- Chairperson: Abdulla Yameen
- Founder: Zeine Abdulla Yameen
- Founded: 24 November 2023
- Registered: 25 April 2024
- Split from: Progressive Party of Maldives; People's National Congress
- Headquarters: Henveiru Dhoovehi, Boduthakurufaanu Magu, Malé Maldives
- Membership (June 2026): 3,137
- Ideology: Social conservatism Right-wing populism
- Political position: Right-wing
- Colors: Purple, Light Green

The People's National Front (Dhivehi: ޕީޕަލްސް ނެޝެނަލް ފްރޮންޓް, PNF) is a right-wing political party in the Maldives, founded in 2023 by Zeine Abdulla Yameen after former President Abdulla Yameen split from the Progressive Party of Maldives. It advocates social conservatism and right-wing populism, with a focus on nationalist policies.

== History ==
Former President of the Maldives Abdulla Yameen left the Progressive Party of Maldives after an internal conflict between the PNC and PPM coalition, then decided to form his own party. Yameen and other members requested approval for the party by the Elections Commission (EC) on 23 November 2023, but since Yameen was serving a sentence for money laundering and bribery, he lacked the authority to do so. His aides went to the EC to discuss the new party. The 8 founding members of the PNF party are:

- Abdulla Yameen (leader and Chairperson)
- Zeine Abdulla Yameen (founder and Vice Chair)
- Mohamed Jameel Ahmed (Vice Chair)
- Abdulla Jihad
- Ahmed Musthafa Mohamed
- Hussain Waheed
- Adhlee Ismail
- Ali Adam

According to the EC regulations, only one official founder was allowed. Hence, the group chose Abdulla Yameen's son Zeine Abdulla Yameen. The party's name, logo, and colors were unveiled on 25 November 2023. It adopted a logo and colors reminiscent of Yameen's previous party, People's Alliance (PA). He was given permission to form the party and was given 3 months to submit 3,000 membership forms to the Elections Commission of the Maldives.

PNF was able to secure the 3000 signs before the given deadline by the Elections Commission of the Maldives, and was officially registered on 25 April 2024, shortly after the 2024 parliamentary elections.

=== Formation and Early Activities ===
The party submitted its 3000 membership forms to the EC and had been given the greenlight to have an inaugural meeting. It was scheduled to be held at Ghiyasuddin International School. However, citing logistical difficulties, the school pulled out on the afternoon of the event. PNF supporters initially gathered at the school hall and had clashes with the police had clashes. Former minister Maleeh Jamal informed the supporters to then gather near Sinamalé Bridge where eventually the inauguration took place after midnight. Zeine Abdulla Yameen was named Interim President until an actual senate was formed.

In October 2025, the PNF held its first national assembly and opened nominations for leadership positions ahead of the event. On 30 October 2025, Abdulla Yameen was elected unopposed as president, with his son Zain Abdulla Yameen and former Vice President Mohamed Jameel Ahmed elected as vice presidents.

In 2026, during the 2026 Mayoral elections, Ismail Zariyand ran on the PNF ticket.

=== Ideology and Policies ===
The PNF's ideology is characterized as social conservatism and right-wing populism, emphasizing Maldivian nationalism, opposition to Indian influence in the Maldives, and support for closer ties with China. It positions itself against the ruling People's National Congress and promotes policies from Yameen's presidency, such as infrastructure development and anti-corruption rhetoric.
