= Midhath Hilmy =

Maldivian politician

- މިދުހަތު ޙިލްމީ
- Known for: Minister of Communication, Science and Technology
- Mother: Sakeena Abdul Gayoom
- Relatives: Gayoom family

Midhath Hilmy (Dhivehi: މިދުހަތު ޙިލްމީ) is a Maldivian politician who served as Minister of Communication, Science and Technology.

== Career ==
Hilmy was appointed as the minister of communication, science and technology by her uncle President Maumoon Abdul Gayoom on 12 October 2002. During her time, she inaugurated the service to extend Dhiraagu's coverage to Addu Atoll, a new phone card to commemorate the 2000s, and to inaugurate Dhiraagu's new paging system.

Hilmy participated in renewables 2004 by the German government representing the Maldives.

== Personal life ==
Hilmy is the daughter of Sakeena Abdul Gayoom and is part of the Gayoom family.
