= Maumoon (disambiguation) =

Maumoon Abdul Gayoom is the 3rd president of the Maldives from 1978 to 2008.

Maumoon may also refer to:

== People ==
- Mamoon Hamid
- Maumoon Moosa Khan
- al-Maumoon

== See also ==
- Moumoon
- Yameen Abdul Gayoom
- President of the Maldives
