= Gayoom family =

Maldivian political family

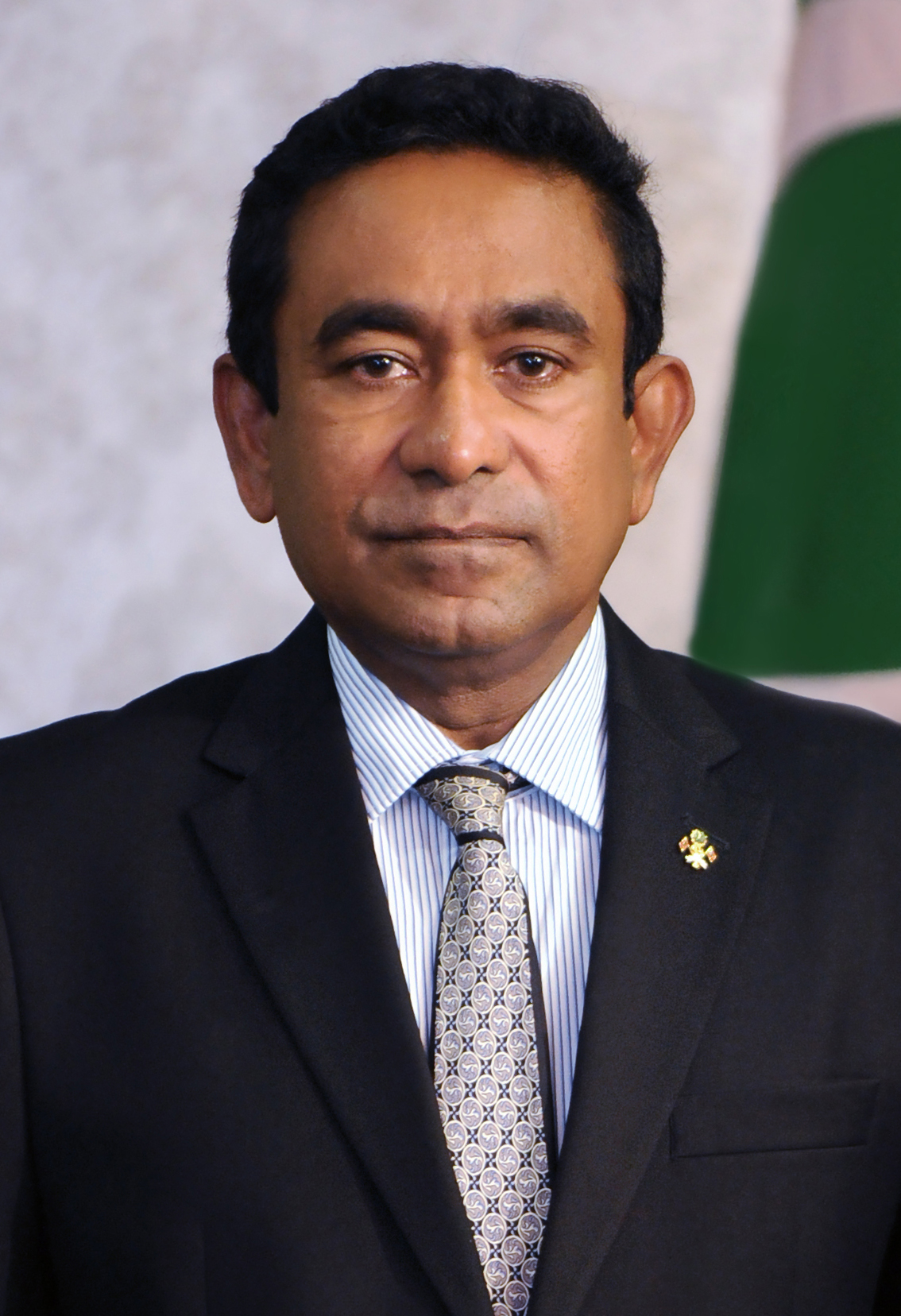
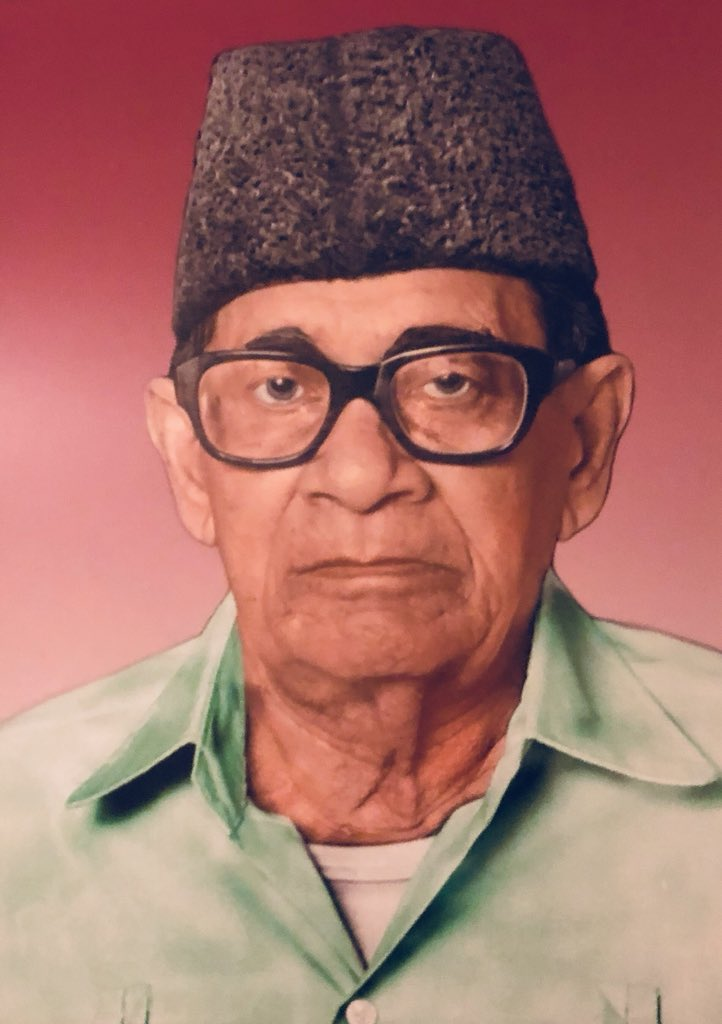
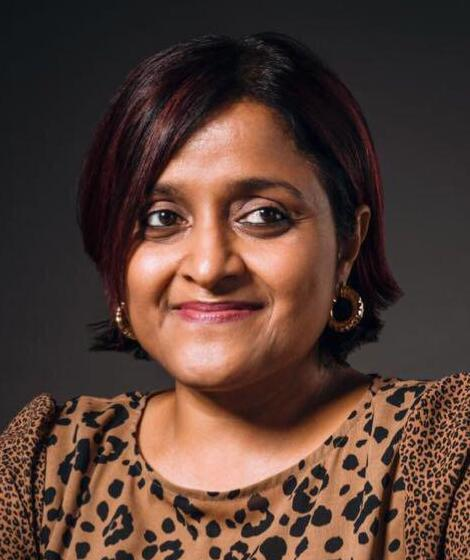
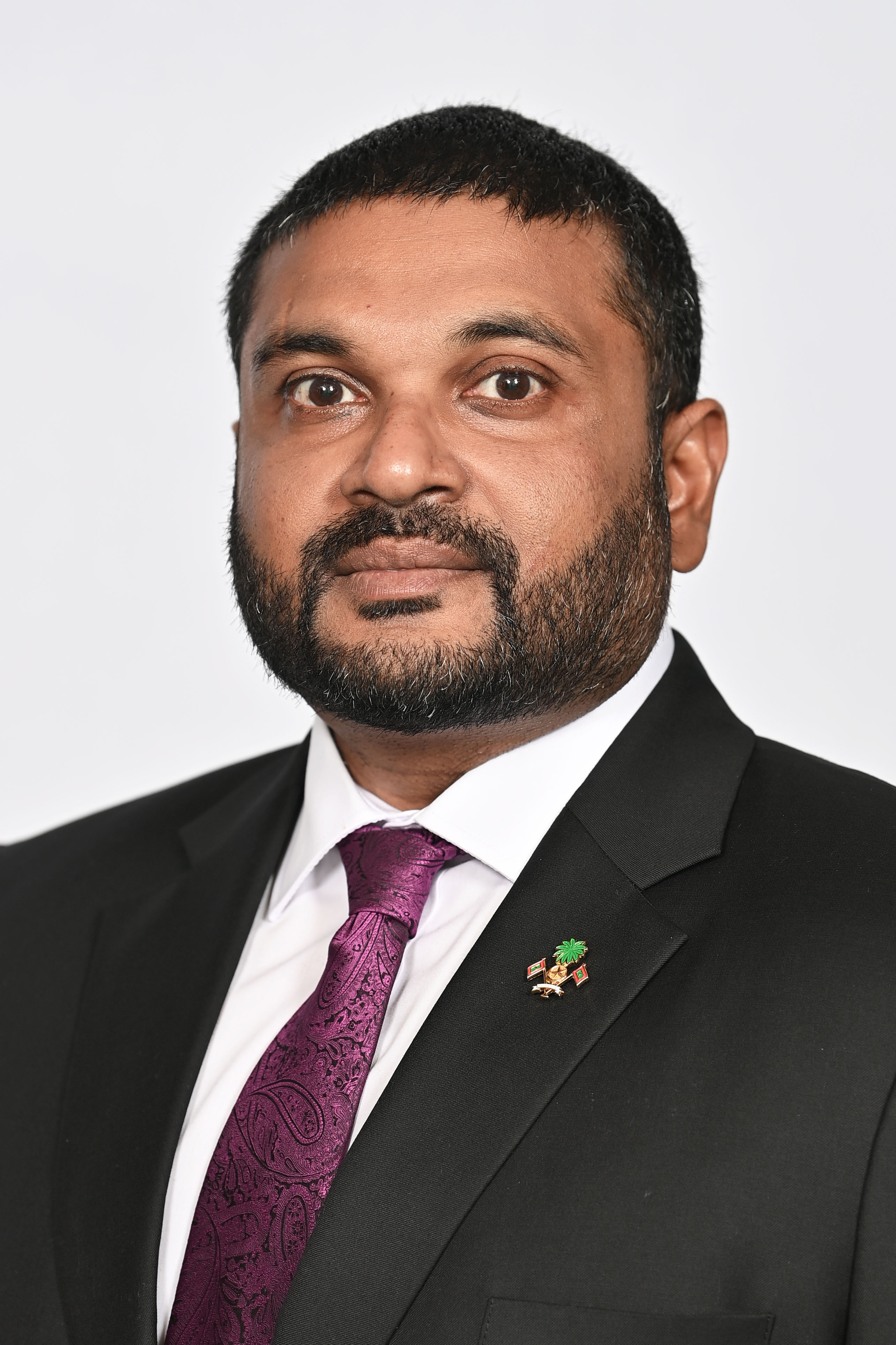
- From left to right: Maumoon Abdul Gayoom, Abdulla Yameen, Abdul Gayoom Ibrahim, Dunya Maumoon, and Mohamed Ghassan Maumoon (bottom right).
- Country: Maldives
- Current region: Malé, Maldives
- Origin: Malé
- Founder: Abdul Gayoom Ibrahim
- Members: Abdul Gayoom Ibrahim; Khadheeja Moosa; Maumoon Abdul Gayoom; Nasreena Ibrahim; Sakeena Abdul Gayoom; Abdulla Hameed; Abdulla Yameen; Ismail Shafeeu; Ahmed Faris Maumoon; Dunya Maumoon; Yumna Maumoon; Mohamed Ghassan Maumoon
- Connected members: Hala Hameed; Hamdhoon Abdulla Hameed; Fathimath Ibrahim; Midhath Hilmy

The Gayoom Family is a Maldivian political family and is one of the most influential families in the history of the Maldives. Members of the family have held key positions in the nation's leadership, including presidents, ministers, ambassadors, parliamentarians, and diplomats, shaping the political and social landscape of the country. The Gayoom family served as the first family of the Maldives for 30 years, during Maumoon Abdul Gayoom's presidency from 1978 to 2008. The family of Gayoom's half-brother Abdulla Yameen Abdul Gayoom, was the first family for 5 years from 2013 to 2018.

The father of presidents, Gayoom and Yameen, Abdul Gayoom Ibrahim served as 7th Attorney General of the Maldives from 1951 to 1952, and a judge. Abdul Gayoom's children include Maumoon Abdul Gayoom, Abdulla Yameen, Abdulla Hameed and others. Maumoon Abdul Gayoom's 4 children, Dunya, Yumna, Faris and Ghassan had a ministerial role in each government since 2008.

== Immediate family ==
=== Nasreena Ibrahim ===
Nasreena Ibrahim (Dhivehi: ނަސްރީނާ އިބްރާހީމް) is a Maldivian women's rights activist who served as the First Lady of the Maldives from 1978 to 2008 during her husband's presidency. She married Maumoon in 1969 in Egypt.

=== Ahmed Faris Maumoon ===
Ahmed Faris Maumoon (Dhivehi: އަޙްމަދު ފާރިސް މައުމޫން) is a Maldivian politician who served as the Minister of State for Economic Development during his uncle Abdulla Yameen's presidency from November 2013 to June 2015 and a member of the People's Majlis from 2015 to 2019. He is the eldest son of Maumoon Abdul Gayoom.

=== Dunya Maumoon ===
Dunya Maumoon (Dhivehi: ދުންޔާ މައުމޫން) is a Maldivian politician who served as the Minister of Foreign Affairs during her uncle Abdulla Yameen's presidency from 2013 to 2016. She's the twin of Yumna Maumoon and the daughter of Maumoon Abdul Gayoom.

=== Yumna Maumoon ===
Yumna Maumoon (Dhivehi: ޔުމްނާ މައުމޫން) is a Maldivian politician who served as the Minister of Arts, Culture, and Heritage from 2018 to 2023. She's the twin of Dunya Maumoon and the daughter of Maumoon Abdul Gayoom.

=== Mohamed Ghassan Maumoon ===
Mohamed Ghassan Maumoon (Dhivehi: މުޙައްމަދު ޣައްސަން މައުމޫން) is a Maldivian politician who served as the Minister of Defence since 2023. He's the youngest son of Maumoon Abdul Gayoom.

== Parents ==
=== Abdul Gayoom Ibrahim ===
Abdul Gayoom Ibrahim (Dhivehi: އަބްދުލް ޤައްޔޫމް އިބްރާހިމް) was a Maldivian politician and judge who served as the 7th Attorney General of the Maldives from 1950 to 1951. He's the father of Maumoon, Yameen, and Hameed.

=== Khadheeja Moosa ===
Maumoon's mother is Khadheeja Moosa.

== Other relations ==
=== Abdulla Yameen ===
Abdulla Yameen Abdul Gayoom (Dhivehi: ޢަބްދުﷲ ޔާމީން ޢަބްދުލް ޤައްޔޫމް) is a Maldivian politician who served as the 6th President of the Maldives from 2013 to 2018. He's the brother of Maumoon Abdul Gayoom.

=== Abdulla Hameed ===
Abdulla Hameed (Dhivehi: ޢަބްދުﷲ ޙަމީދު) is a Maldivian politician who served as the Minister of Atolls and the Speaker of the People's Majlis during his brother Maumoon Abdul Gayoom's presidency. He's the brother of Maumoon Abdul Gayoom.
