= Abdul Gayoom Ibrahim =

Attorney General of the Maldives from 1950 to 1951

- އަބްދުލް ޤައްޔޫމް އިބްރާހިމް
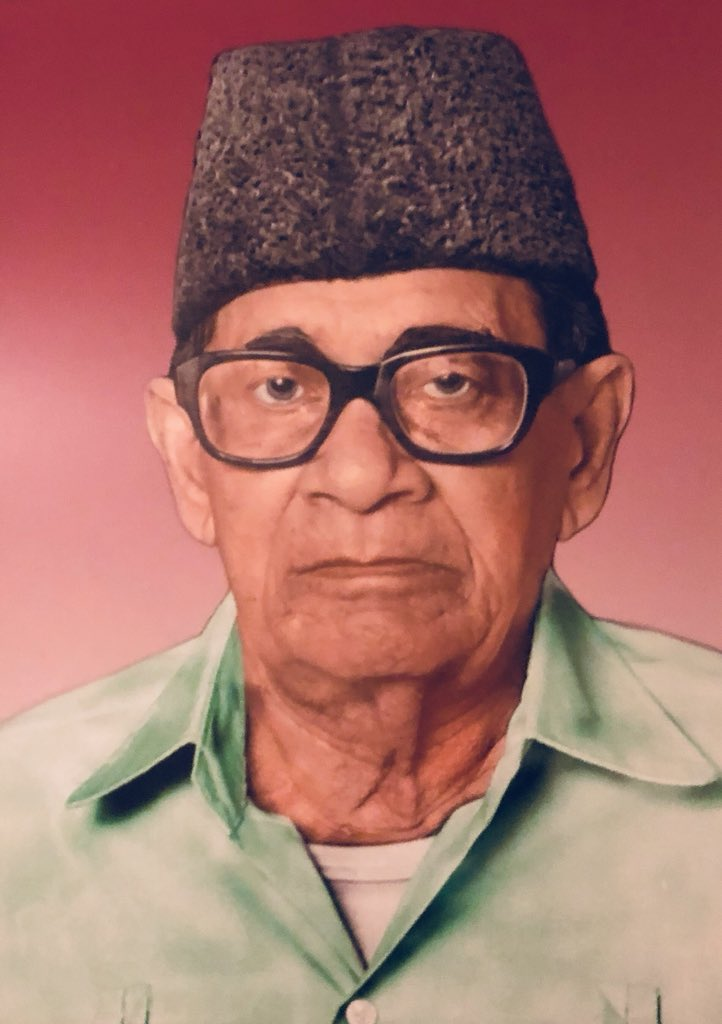
- Abdul Gayoom, 1970s

7th Attorney General of the Maldives
- In office 23 August 1950 – 17 May 1951
- Prime Minister: Mohamed Amin Didi
- Preceded by: Mohamed Nasir Manik
- Succeeded by: Ahmed Kamil Didi

Personal details
- Born: 18 October 1897 Malé, Sultanate of the Maldive Islands
- Died: 30 April 1982 (aged 84) Malé, Maldives
- Relations: Gayoom family
- Children: Sakeena, Ghani, Nasir, Mansoor, Maumoon, Hameed, Moomina, Majeed, Yameen, Mamnoon, Algeen, Baniyaameen, Muslimaa, Ramlaa and many more children (including 25)

Sheikh Abdul Gayoom Ibrahim (Dhivehi: އަބްދުލް ޤައްޔޫމް އިބްރާހިމް; 18 October 1897 – 30 April 1982), commonly known as Maafaiygey Dhon Seedhi, was a Maldivian politician and judge who served as Attorney General of the Maldive Islands from 1950 to 1951.

Abdul Gayoom was the father of presidents, Abdulla Yameen Abdul Gayoom and Maumoon Abdul Gayoom. He is also the father of Abdulla Hameed Abdul Gayoom, who twice served as Speaker of the People's Majlis.

== Early life and family ==
Abdul Gayoom Ibrahim was born on 18 October 1897, the son of Galolhu Sitti and her husband, Ibrahim. His mother, Sitti, was the daughter of Galolhu Seedhi, son of Ibrahim Al-Husainee, who was the grandchild of Al-Naib Muhammad Thakurufaanu of Addu Atoll. Ibrahim was born and raised in the capital, Malé. In 1917, he had his first child, a daughter, Sakeena Abdul Gayoom. In total, he had twenty–five children from 8 wives.

Ibrahim was also a judge who worked at court.

== Attorney Generalship ==
On 23 August 1950, Ibrahim was appointed as Attorney General of the Maldive Islands by then–supreme leader and prime minister, Mohamed Amin Didi. Under his Attorney Generalship, Attorney General's Office was established as a separate entity, with mandate to undertake investigations except in criminal and political matters.
