= People's Alliance (Maldives) =

Political party in the Maldives from 2008 to 2013

- Abbreviation: PA
- Leader: Ahmed Nazim
- Registered: 4 August 2008
- Dissolved: 2013
- Split from: Dhivehi Rayyithunge Party
- Headquarters: H. Melaim, 2nd Floor, Boduthakurufaanu Magu, Male, Maldives
- Youth wing: Young PA
- Religion: Sunni Islam
- Colors: Purple

Website
- http://pa.org.mv

The People's Alliance was a political party in the Maldives. The party was registered by the Election Commission on 4 August 2008 and was dissolved in 2013.

The party's former leader was former trade minister and former president of Maldives Abdulla Yameen, a half brother of former President Maumoon Abdul Gayoom. He resigned in 2010, to join the Progressive Party of Maldives.

The vice-president of the party was Hon. Moosa Zameer, who was an MP of Kinbidhoo Constituency.

The party treasurer was Hon. Ahmed Musthafa.

The President of the Young PA (Youth wing) was Hon. Abdulla Rifau
