= Laiba Ahmed Mahloof =

Maldivian badminton player (born 2013)

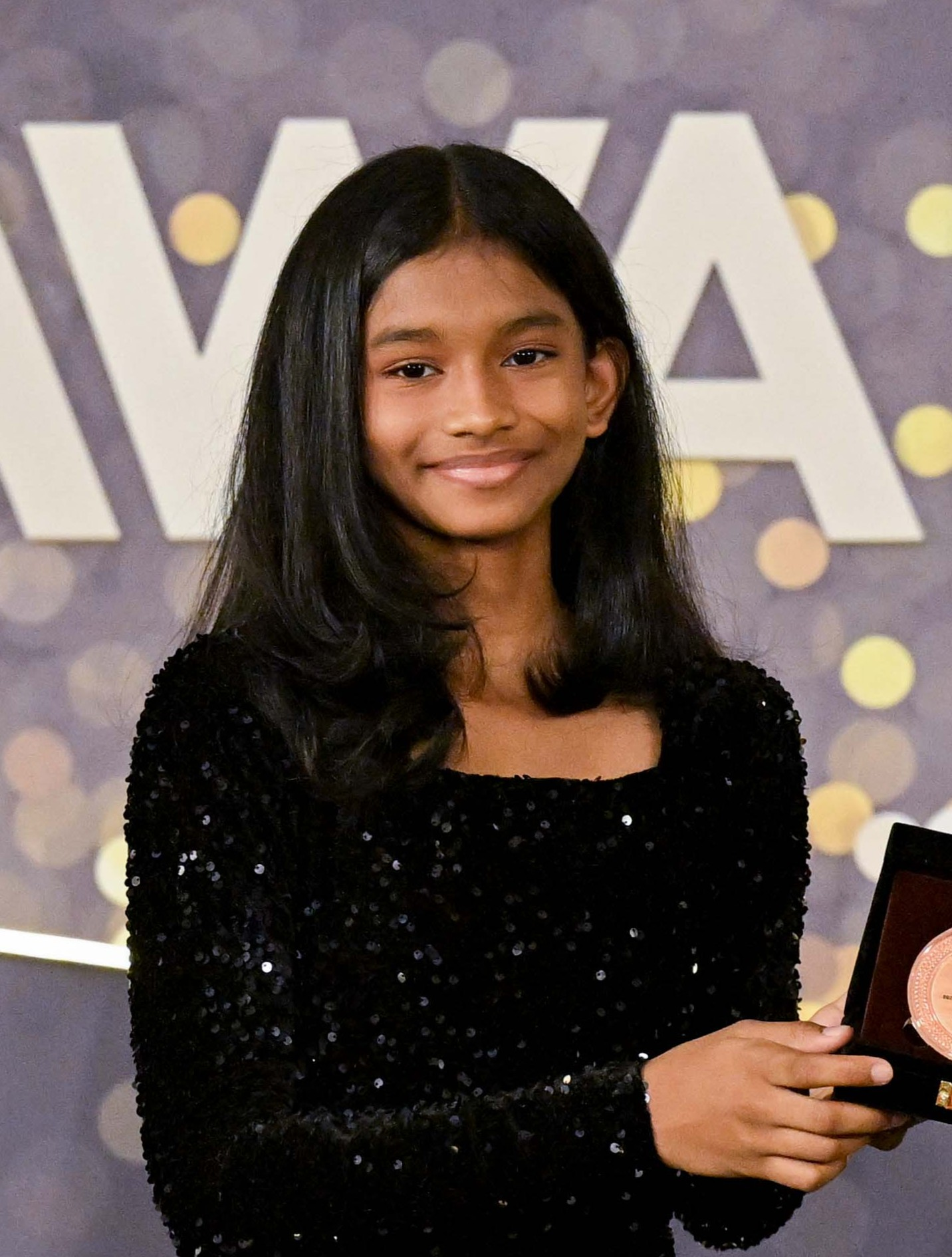
- Mahloof at the 2024 Maldives Sports Awards

Personal information
- Nickname: Elly (Note: Also spelled as Eli)
- Born: 3 March 2013 (age 13)
- Years active: 2023–present

Sport
- Country: Maldives
- Sport: Badminton
- Handedness: Right
- BWF profile
- Updated on 5 January 2026

Laiba 'Elly' Ahmed Mahloof (Dhivehi: ލައިބާ އަހްމަދު މަހްލޫފް; born 3 March 2013) is a Maldivian badminton player. She medalled in multiple youth international competitions that she had participated in.

== Early life ==
Laiba Ahmed Mahloof was born on 3 March 2013 to Ahmed Mahloof and Nazra Naseem.

When she was 7, her parents uploaded videos of her singing various songs on social media which went viral.

== Career ==
Mahloof made her international debut in a tournament in Bolzano, where she played in the U-11 category. She had also participated in the 2023 Li Ning Medward Cup held in Slovenia. She participated in the U-11 singles, U-13 singles and U-13 women's doubles events, winning third place in the U-11 singles. She had also participated in the 18th Inter-School Badminton Tournament in the Greater Malé Zone.

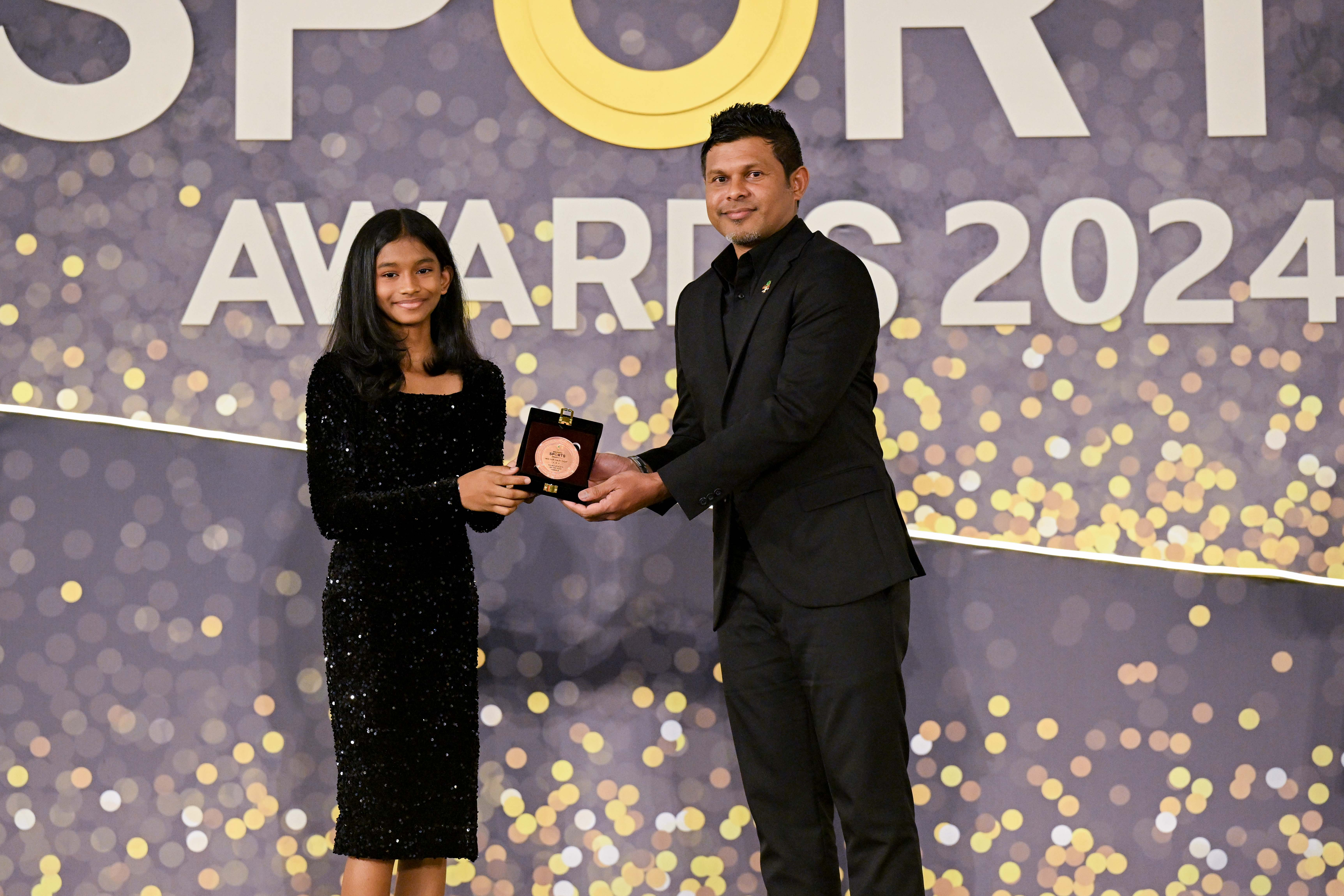
Hussain Mohamed Latheef awarding Mahloof the bronze medal in Athlete of the Year (Women's Category) at the 2024 Maldives Sports Awards

In 2024, Mahloof had participated in the Armenian Youth Open 2024 in U-13 doubles and U-14 doubles, winning bronze in the first and silver in the latter. Additionally, she had participated in the 2024 Mirna International Youth Tournament, winning bronze in the U-13 doubles category. She had also participated in the 2024 YONEX Polish International Festival, winning a bronze medal in the mixed doubles event. Mahloof participated in the Batumi Cup - Youth International Badminton Tournament held in Georgia, where she participated in the U-13 singles, doubles, and mixed doubles. She had won bronze in the U-13 singles and silver in the doubles event. In the 2024 Maldives Sports Awards, Mahloof was nominated as Young Athlete of the Year in the Women's category. She later won bronze medal in the Young Athlete of the Year.

In 2025, Mahloof participated in the Winter Chisinau 2025 tournament held in Moldova, where she participated in the doubles and mixed doubles. Mahloof had won bronze in doubles while a silver in mixed doubles. Mahloof had also participated in the 2025 Bozen Spring – International Spring Tournament, where she participated in the girls doubles and mixed double events. She had won bronze in both events. Additionally, she participated in the Armenian Youth Open 2025, playing in the women's singles, doubles, and mixed doubles event. She had won gold medals in all three of those categories, marking her first time winning a gold. President Mohamed Muizzu congratulated Mahloof and called it "an honour for the Maldives". Furthermore, Mahloof participated in the Batumi Cup Youth International 2025 in Georgia, where she participated in U-13 singles, doubles, and mixed doubles. She had won bronze in singles and mixed doubles while winning silver in doubles. Furthermore, she had also participated in the Eydhafushi Badminton Cup in Eydhafushi, where she won singles championship. She also won three gold medals and one bronze medal.

In 2026, Mahloof was nominated as the Sportswoman of the Year 2025 in the Badminton category. She also secured her place in the senior badminton team of the Maldives.
