= Maldives Post =

National post office of the Maldives

Maldives Post Limited
- Company type: State-owned company
- Industry: Mail
- Founded: 1994; 32 years ago
- Headquarters: Post Building, Boduthakurufaanu Magu, Henveiru, Malé, Maldives
- Key people: Adam Mohamed - Managing Director
- Website: maldivespost.com

Maldives Post Limited is the national post office of the Maldives.

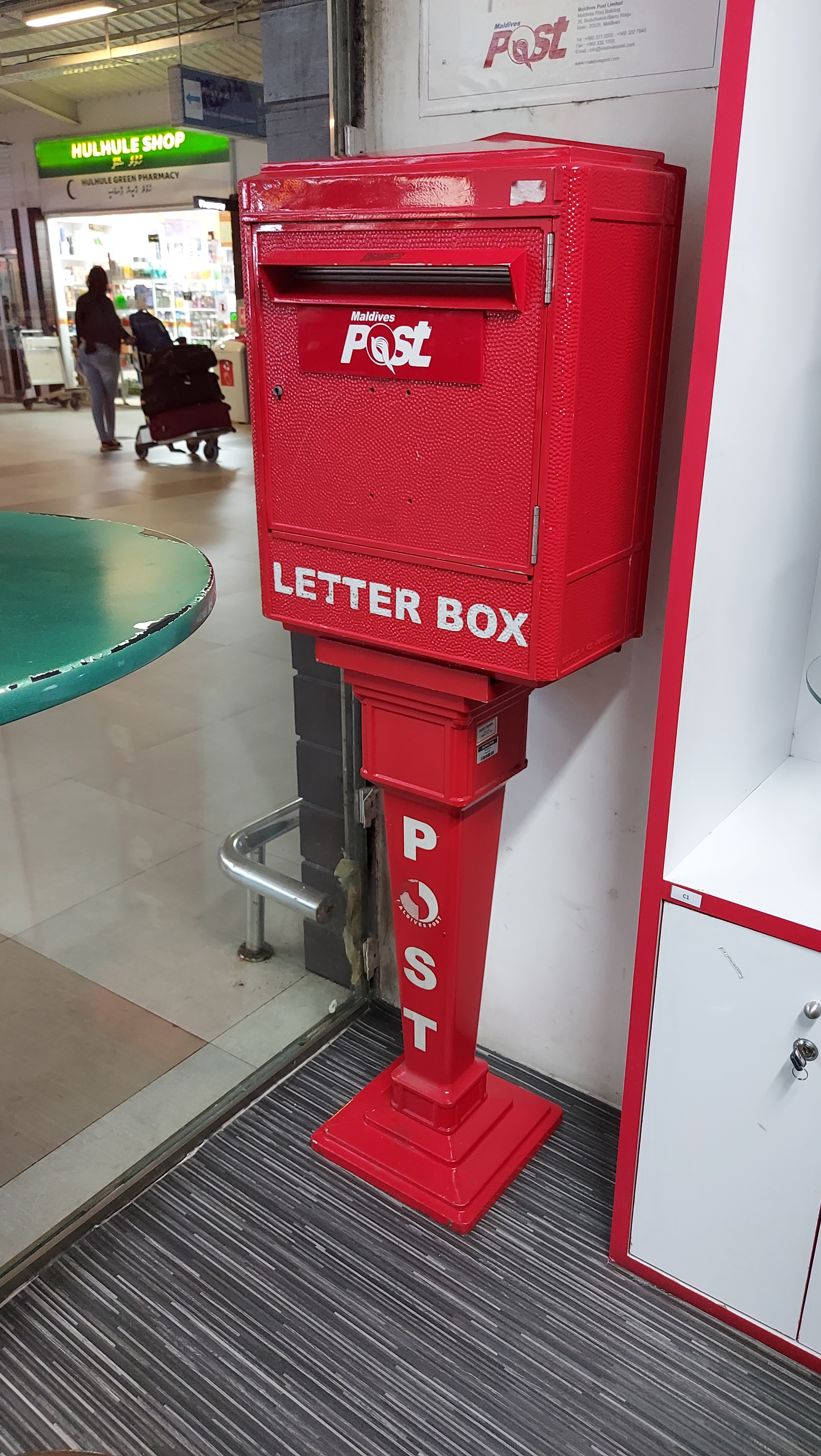
A Maldives Post letter box in front of a post shop at Velana International Airport.

The company offers a range of postal services including the Express Mail Service and a money order service.

== History ==
In the beginning, the postal service first used Sri Lankan “Twenty-Five Cent Stamp” with “Maldives” on top as postage, the first Maldivian postage stamp was produced in 1908. This stamp with the Grand Minaret was printed in Great Britain. Maldives Post first used the postage rates of India as it was used by other countries which were set by the Universal Postal Union. Post services was provided as a government department and the service remained a basic communication method in the country for decades.

Maldives Post Limited formed as a limited liable company in 1994 and it fully owned by the Maldivian Government with a mandate of providing postal service across the country and abroad under the Universal Postal Service Obligation (USO). It is the national postal operator in the country with a network of 14 atoll post offices and 172 agency offices across the nation providing access to postal service in all inhabited islands.

Unlike other countries, in the Maldives, they use 'names' to distinguish between one house from the other. In the archipelago of 1200 islands, 200 of them are inhabited. In all these inhabited islands, houses are identified by their unique name rather than a post code or a zip code. However, on different islands, the name of the house can be repeated, but not on the same island.
