= Haotak Laiba =

Haotak Laiba (ꯍꯥꯎꯇꯥꯛ ꯂꯥꯏꯕ) was an Indian warrior king of the Khende clan, in Ancient Kangleipak (early Manipur). He is notably mentioned in the classical Meitei literary text Chainarol (An Account of Combats). He is best known for his dramatic single combat with Yaiphurakpa, the king of Chairen, showing the Manipuri martial traditions and honour codes of ancient Meitei civilisation. He is remembered as a flawed but honourable warrior, proud and quick to anger, but also willing to accept defeat with grace. His story shows the tension between personal pride, marital suspicion, and warrior ethics.

His character contrasts with others in the Chainarol, where fights often end in violence. In Haotak Laiba's case, reconciliation and respect prevailed, making his story one of the most human and nuanced in the narrative.

== Conflict with Yaiphurakpa ==
During a royal hunting event, Haotak Laiba's wife hosted Yaiphurakpa, king of Chairen, offering him a warm welcome with rich food and drinks. A year later, Yaiphurakpa returned the favour by hosting Haotak Laiba with even greater hospitality. However, this gesture sparked jealousy and suspicion in Haotak Laiba. He accused Yaiphurakpa of becoming too close with his wife, an accusation Yaiphurakpa denied. To resolve the dispute in a manner befitting warriors, they agreed to a duel in archery at a site called Lawai Ponbikhok Chairen Theichang Poong.

== Duel and aftermath ==
Haotak Laiba shot first, invoking the names of Heaven and Earth, but missed. Yaiphurakpa's arrow hit Haotak Laiba in the thigh, making him the clear winner. Though custom dictated that the victor should take the loser's head, Yaiphurakpa chose to spare Haotak Laiba's life, moved by their previous friendship. The two reconciled peacefully, sharing drinks after the duel, a rare ending in the Chainarol, where most stories end in death.

== See also ==
- Meitei confederacy
- Meitei warrior traditions
- Khuman warrior traditions
- Meitei martial arts
- Meitei traditional weapons
- Khuman kingdom
- Moirang kingdom
- Khuman Kangleirol
- Moirang Kangleirol
