= Prosecutor General of the Maldives =

Prosecutor General of the Republic of Maldives
- ދިވެހިރާއްޖޭގެ ޕްރޮސިކިއުޓަރ ޖެނެރަލް (Dhivehi)

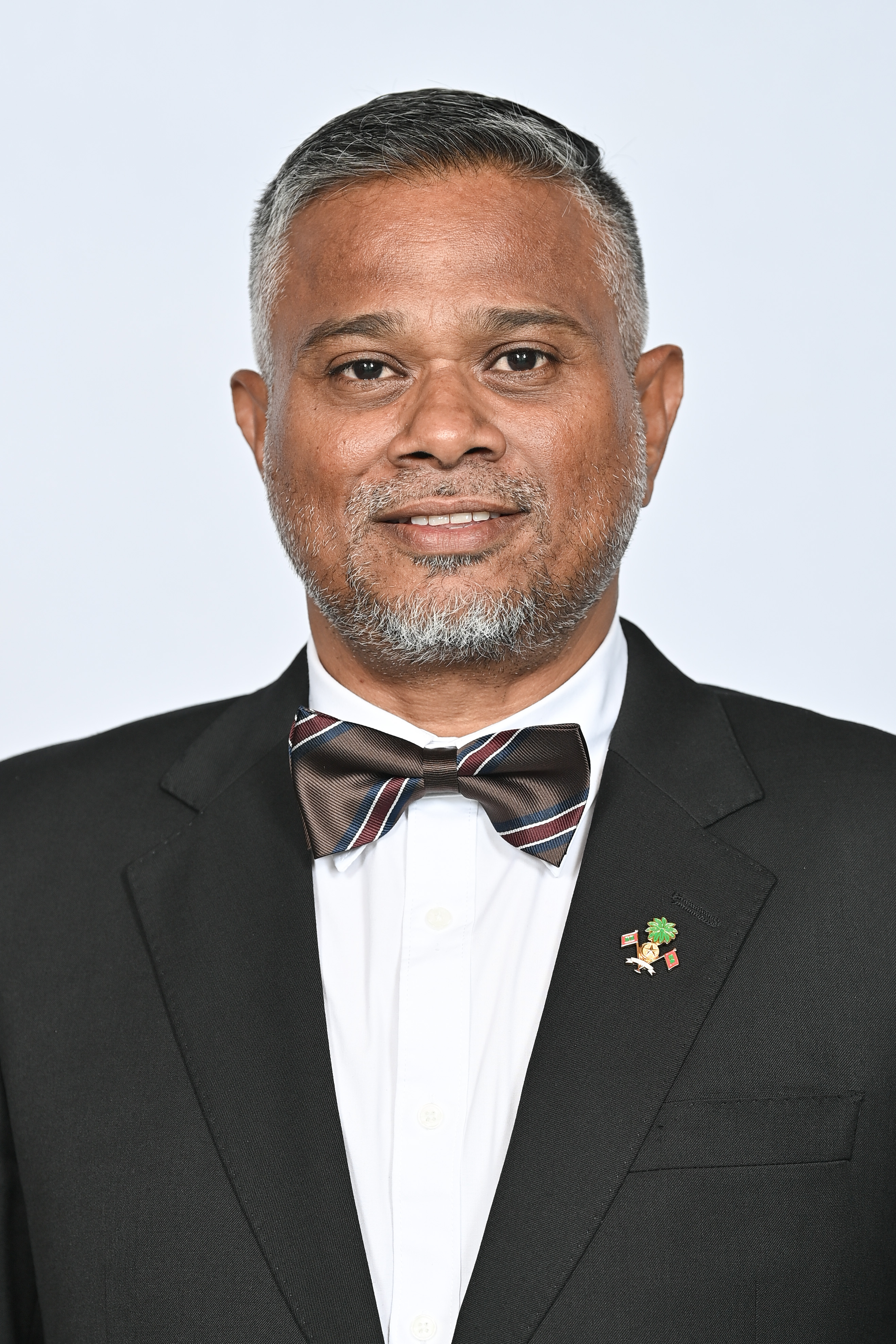
- Incumbent; Abbas Shareef since 18 September 2024
- Prosecutor General's Office
- Style: The Honourable
- Type: Public procurator
- Nominator: People's Majlis
- Appointer: President of the Maldives
- Term length: Five years
- Formation: 7 September 2008; 18 years ago
- First holder: Ahmed Muizzu
- Website: pgoffice.gov.mv

The Prosecutor General of the Maldives is the chief legal officer responsible for conducting criminal prosecutions in the Republic of Maldives. The post was established under the 2008 Constitution, on 7 September 2008, and its primary role is to ensure the fair and impartial prosecution of criminal cases in the Maldives. The Prosecutor General (PG) is appointed by the President of the Maldives, with the approval of the People's Majlis, and serves for a term of five years, with eligibility for reappointment.

Since its establishment in 2008, there has been 4 Prosecutors General.

== History ==
The post of Prosecutor General was established on 7 September 2008.

== Powers ==
Article 220 of the Constitution of the Maldives stipulates that the Prosecutor General is required to carry out their duties in accordance with the Constitution and laws enacted by the People's Majlis.

=== Responsibilities ===
- To supervise the prosecution of all criminal offences in the Maldives, and to consider and assess evidence presented by investigating bodies to determine whether charges should be pursued.
- To institute and conduct criminal proceedings against any person before any court in respect of any alleged offence.
- To oversee the legality of preliminary inquiries and investigations into alleged criminal activity.
- To monitor and review the circumstances and conditions under which any person is arrested, detained or otherwise deprived of freedom prior to trial.
- To order any investigation that deems desirable into complaints of criminal activity or into any other criminal activity of which he becomes aware.
- To take over, review and continue any criminal proceedings instituted by any prosecuting body authorized to initiate prosecutions pursuant to a law enacted by the People's Majilis, and at his discretion to discontinue any criminal proceedings at any stage prior to judgment.
- To review or revert any decisions to prosecute or not to prosecute any alleged offender, or to discontinue any prosecution.
- To appeal any judgment, verdict or decision in a criminal matter; To issue policy directives which shall be observed in the entire prosecutorial process.
- To uphold the constitutional order, the law, and the rights and freedoms of all citizens.

== Prosecutors general ==
No.	Portrait	Name	Term of office			Ref.
No.	Portrait	Name	Took office	Left office	Time in office	Ref.
1		Ahmed Muizzu	26 July 2009	25 November 2013	4 years, 122 days	
Vacant (25 November 2013 – 22 July 2014)
2		Muhthaz Muhsin	22 July 2014	11 November 2015	1 year, 112 days	
3		Aishath Bisam	24 November 2015	28 November 2019	4 years, 127 days	
4		Hussain Shameem	8 December 2019	22 August 2024	4 years, 258 days	
Vacant (22 August – 18 September 2024)
5		Abbas Shareef	18 September 2024	Incumbent	1 year, 354 days	
