= The President's Office =

Office of the head of state of the Maldives

The President's Office of the Maldives

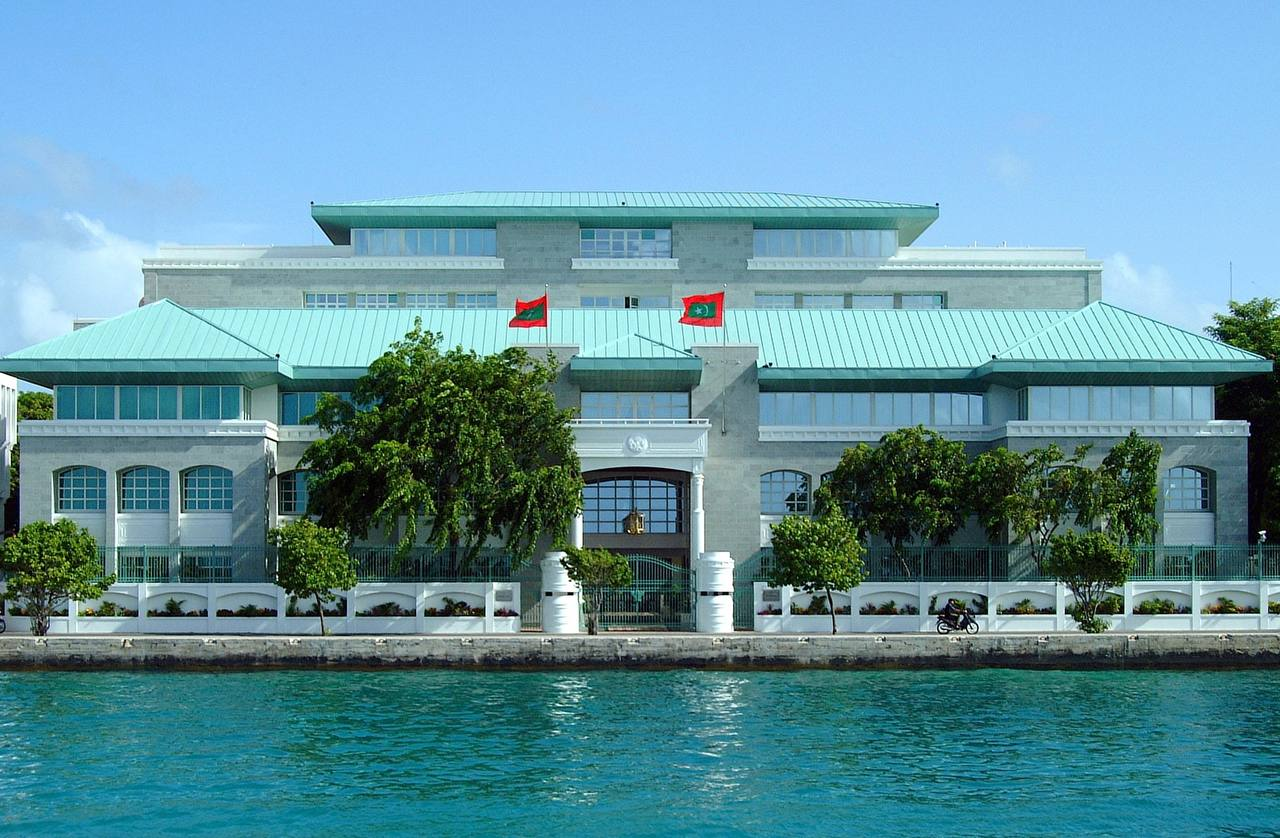
- Front View of The President's Office

Agency overview
- Formed: November 11, 1968; 57 years ago
- Headquarters: Boduthakurufaanu Magu, Malé, Maldives; 4°10′43″N 73°30′45″E
- Employees: 347 (approximately)
- Annual budget: MVR 208,836 (US$13,543.2) (2024 est.)
- President responsible: Mohamed Muizzu
- Agency executive: Abdulla Fayaz, Chief of Staff
- Website: presidency.gov.mv

The President's Office (Dhivehi: ރައީސުލްޖުމްހޫރިއްޔާގެ އޮފީސް, romanized: raeesuljumhooriyyaage ofees; PO) is the office of the President of the Maldives. It was established on 11 November 1968 with the adoption of the Second Republic in 1968. The President's Office administer functions and activities to facilitate the President exercising Executive authority as provided for in the Constitution and law.

== Offices ==
=== Cabinet Office ===
The Cabinet Office was established firstly to coordinate the activities of the cabinet and to provide technical advice and secretarial support to the cabinet, secondly to provide all the necessary information and assistance to the President if and when the President is held answerable and accountable to the People's Majlis and to assist the President in carrying out his responsibilities with regard to elections, public referendums, protection of the constitution and with regard to his role as Head of State and Head of Government. Finally it is to carryout the functions of establishing and abolishing government ministries, departments, offices and other such agencies and appoint, transfer and termination of political employees are also functions of Cabinet Office.

Public Service Training Institute functions under the Cabinet Office and has a mandate of providing the required skills and training for public sector employees, in order to facilitate the administrative reform process and improve service delivery.

=== Executive Service Office ===
Organization Structure of The President's Office as of June 2024

The Executive Service Office was established to administer the Secretariat of the President, Vice President and Special Envoy and for the purposes of administering the responsibilities of the President's Office with regard to presidential appointments, visits, meetings and functions held by and attended by the president and the Vice President.

=== Policy office ===
Policy Office was established to provide assistant in formatting government policies, monitor and evaluate the progress of these policies and projects and to provide technical advice as well as secretarial support for evaluation and development of government policies and projects.

=== Press Office ===
Press Office was established to prepare all press releases by the President's Office, and prepare speeches, addresses, statements and interviews given by the President. All publications of the President's Office are administered by this office. It is also a function of the Press Office to process letters and cases put forward to the President by individuals and private entities and process requests for pardon and requests for reducing sentences. The office also administers the work related to presidential awards and public service awards.

=== Finance and Administration office ===
The function of the Finance and Administration Office is to manage human resources of the office, provide technical solutions, plan and coordinate the allocation of mandate and functions of the office, oversee the coordination of activities, and manage the provision of general services. It is also a task of Finance and Administration Office to manage budget, accounts, property, oversee maintenance needs, construction requirements, procurement and housekeeping needs.

=== Legal Affairs Office ===
The functions of the Legal Affairs Office include the submission of Bills, international treaties signed by the Executive, and other matters requiring approval of the Parliament under the Constitution, to the Parliament. It also administers the process of Presidential assent to the Bills passed by the Parliament.

The Legal Affairs Office is responsible for getting the necessary legal advice and providing assistance to the President in carrying out his responsibilities with regard to the protection of the Constitution, and as Head of State and Head of Government. It also provides legal opinions on issues requested by other Offices of the President's Office, and handles legal matters received by the President's Office. The Legal Affairs Office further ensures that the President's Office is kept up to date with Parliamentary proceedings.

== Chief of Staff ==
The Chief of Staff at The President's Office of Maldives is the highest administrative authority and will be in charge of the daily funds of the President's Office, under direction from the president and the vice president. The post of Chief of Staff is ranked at Cabinet level (Ministerial Rank).

=== List of Chiefs of Staff ===
Name	Term of office		President	Ref
Name	Took office	Left office	President	Ref
Ahmed Mausoom	9 August 2011	7 February 2012	Mohamed Nasheed	
Dr Mohamed Ali	12 February 2012	24 May 2012	Mohamed Waheed	
Ahmed Musthafa Mohamed	24 April 2014	17 November 2018	Abdulla Yameen	
Ali Zahir	18 November 2018	18 November 2023	Ibrahim Mohamed Solih	
Abdulla Fayaz	18 November 2023	(incumbent)	Mohamed Muizzu	
