= Abdulla Yameen =

President of the Maldives from 2013 to 2018

- ޢަބްދުﷲ ޔާމީން
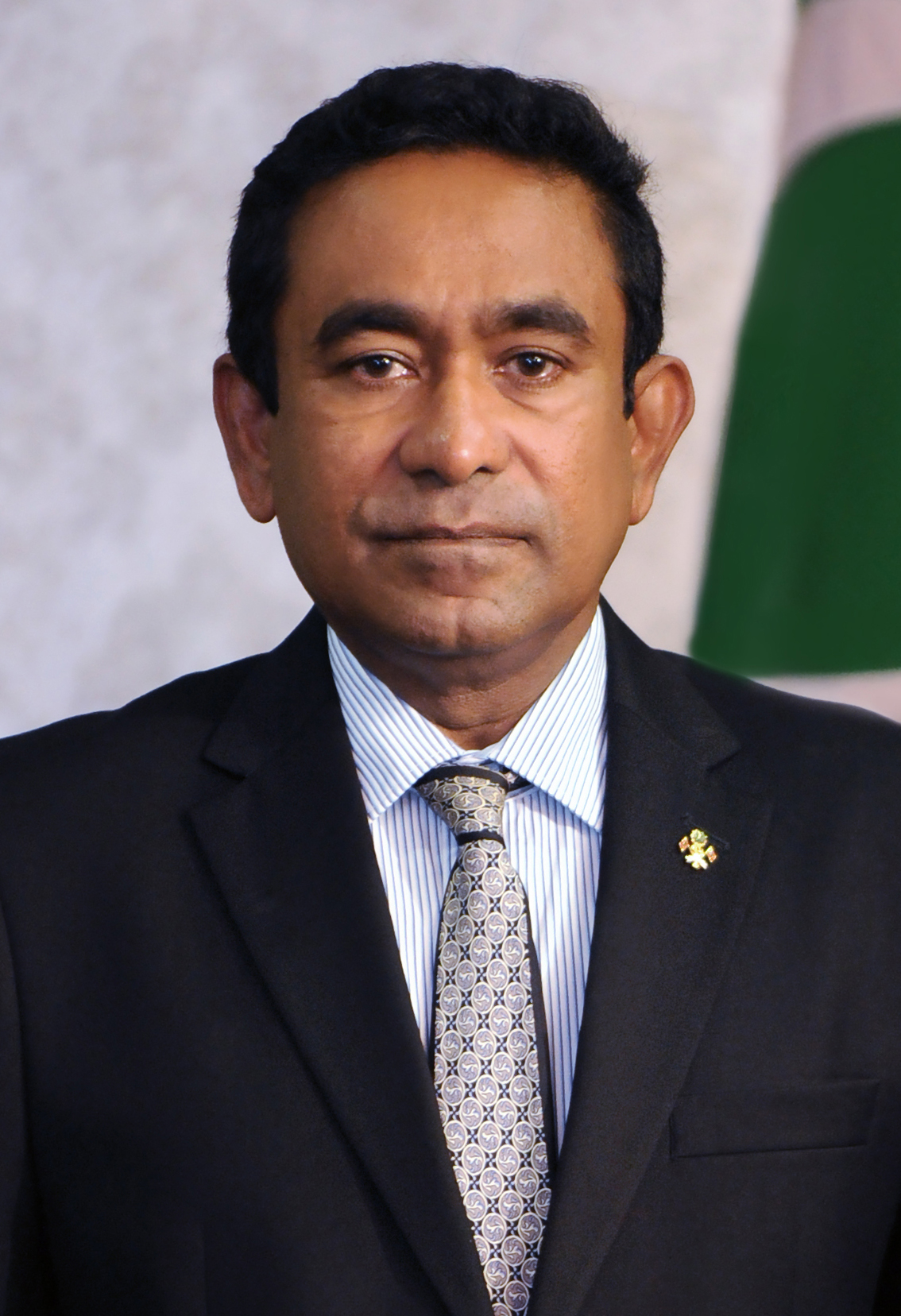
- Official portrait, 2013

6th President of the Maldives
- In office 17 November 2013 – 17 November 2018
- Vice President: Mohamed Jameel Ahmed (2013–2015); Ahmed Adeeb (2015); Abdulla Jihad (2016–2018)
- Preceded by: Mohamed Waheed Hassan
- Succeeded by: Ibrahim Mohamed Solih

Personal details
- Born: Abdulla Yameen Abdul Gayoom; 21 May 1959 (age 67) Reendhoomaage, Malé, Maldives
- Party: People's National Front (since 2023)
- Other political affiliations: Progressive Party of Maldives (2011–2023); People's National Congress (affiliated non-member, 2019–2023); People's Alliance (2008–2011); Dhivehi Rayyithunge Party (until 2008)
- Spouse: Fathimath Ibrahim (m. 1985)
- Relations: Gayoom family
- Children: 3, including Zeine
- Parent: Abdul Gayoom Ibrahim
- Education: American University of Beirut; Claremont Graduate University

Abdulla Yameen Abdul Gayoom (Dhivehi: ޢަބްދުﷲ ޔާމީން ޢަބްދުލް ޤައްޔޫމް; born 21 May 1959) is a Maldivian politician who served as president of the Maldives from 2013 to 2018.

Yameen was elected president in the 2013 presidential election as the candidate of the Progressive Party (PPM), defeating Maldivian Democratic Party (MDP) leader and former president Mohamed Nasheed in the second round of the re-run, after the initial election was annulled. He was the second democratically elected president of the Republic of the Maldives. Yameen's presidential tenure oversaw a number of infrastructure development projects, such as airports and healthcare facilities, most of which were financed through loans from the Chinese government. His presidency was rife with allegations of human rights infringements and corruption. He left office on 17 November 2018 following his defeat in the 2018 presidential election to Ibrahim Mohamed Solih.

Following his departure from office, Yameen was charged with corruption and money laundering in connection to the Maldives Marketing and Public Relations Corporation scandal, and was sentenced to 11 years in prison. He has since been freed from prison.

== Career ==
Yameen started his government service in July 1978. Following his undergraduate studies in Beirut, Lebanon. He served first as Secretary at the Department of Finance and then as Research Officer at the Research and International Organisations Division of the Maldives Monetary Authority (MMA).

On his return after completing his postgraduate studies, Yameen started serving at Ministry of Trade and Industries. He held many post throughout his career at the ministry and was appointed as Minister of Trade and Industries on 11 November 1993 under president Maumoon Abdul Gayoom.

As the Trade Minister, Yameen helped Maldives become part of Multilateral Investment Guarantee Agency (MIGA) and other international trade and investment organisations.

Under his half-brother president Maumoon Abdul Gayoom, Yameen held key cabinet positions, first as Minister of Higher Education (July 2005 – April 2007) and then as Minister of Tourism and Civil Aviation (September 2008 – 20 November 2008).

== Entry into politics ==
After the 2008 Maldivian presidential election the Dhivehi Rayyithunge Party leadership was thrown into contentious conflicts of interest. This led to the president of the party and former president Maumoon Abdul Gayyoom to resign.

Yameen left the party and created his own People's Alliance. His party contested in the 2009 Maldivian parliamentary election and won 7 seats including him and he gained support of Qasim Ibrahim. This led to Maumoon and Yameen to decide to join power and create Progressive Party of Maldives in 2011.

During the 2011–13 Maldives political crisis Yameen played a major role in ousting president Mohamed Nasheed from office who he viewed as a threat to Islam and the nation. President Mohamed Waheed Hassan created a new alliance with the opposition political leaders and created a coalition against Nasheed for the 2013 Presidential Election.

=== 2013 presidential election ===
In the first round of voting for the 2013 Maldivian presidential election Yameen received 61,278 (29.72%) of the vote and the main opposition former president Mohamed Nasheed received 96,764 (46.93%).

However, no candidates received more than the 50% which is the minimum support required to be president.

Before the second round the coalition decided to back Yameen as the president against Nasheed. 111,203 (51.39%) was received by Yameen and he was sworn in as president as soon as election officials declared him the winner.

== Presidency (2013–2018) ==
The China-Maldives Friendship Bridge (now officially named the Sinamalé Bridge) project, which was launched in 2015, is the first of its kind in the Maldives. It is 1.4 kilometres long and 20 metres wide, linking Malé's eastern edge to the western corner of Hulhulé Island, where Velana International Airport is located. It will provide one lane for four-wheeled vehicles and one lane for motorcycles on either side. There is also a lane for pedestrians on both sides.

The project began in 2014 and he inaugurated the Sinamalé Bridge on 30 August 2018.

Expansion of the country's main gateway, Velana International Airport is expected to be completed within the second quarter of 2018. The project will expand and increase the capacity of the airport to handle more passengers and aircraft. This ambitious project consists of a fuel farm with a storage capacity of 45 million litres and a cargo complex with the capacity to handle 120,000 tonnes, a new Code F 3,400-meter-long, 60-meter-wide runway which is able to cater to the largest of aircraft such as Antonov An-225 and Airbus A380 and a new passenger terminal. Upon completion, the existing runway will be converted into a taxiway, reducing the turnaround time of aircraft at the airport. The new terminal is expected to increase the ability to serve around 8 million passengers from the current rate of 1.5 million passengers a year. The new international passenger terminal will consist of a floor area of 78,000 square meters, the new terminal will have 40 departure checking counters, 38 immigration counters, 12 jetties, and six aero-bridges.

Other new airports are being developed to accommodate to the increase of the influx of more passengers and tourists which is expected to rise in the years to come. New regional airports are being built on islands such as Kulhudhuffushi and existing regional airports such as Gan International Airport have been converted to international airports with international airlines slowly beginning their operations.

Hulhumalé was also being developed under the supervision of Yameen. The new land required for Phase II of Hulhumalé was reclaimed at the beginning of 2014 and ever since, speedy development has followed through such as construction of roads and other necessary infrastructure. Yameen has also initiated a grand housing project called 'Hiyaa' to provide sheltering for an estimated 100,000 people. The project under the second phase of Hulhumalé's development will see the construction of 10,080 housing units including flats.

Yameen had further pledged to improve healthcare facilities to include better treatment of cancer patients and those with heart ailments – in addition to committing towards improving investigative, and other technical capabilities. Furthermore, the new 25-storey high-rise hospital, Dharumavantha Hospital, considered as the biggest investment for the Maldivian Health sector under Yameen's administration, will be a technologically innovative inclusion to the Maldives health sector and promises to deliver enhanced services and would utilize new and improved state-of-the-art equipment. The building is designed to 'shield' radiation while a life support system will be installed to the premises. Furthermore, six floors of the building is designated to national diagnostic center. The building will also have a fully equipped and enclosed section to store volatile chemicals. Other facilities planned to be included in the building include a gym, hydro-therapy center, rehabilitation suite along with a child care center and a swimming pool. A new medical college which meets the international standards is also being established for the first time ever under the supervision of Yameen to further revolutionize the health sector in Maldives. Two floors of the new state-of-the-art hospital is designated to the medical college to facilitate the best amenities for the students practicing their MBBS in the medical college in Maldives.

In Addu, a new tertiary hospital is being completed to ensure access to top level healthcare apart from only being available in just the capital city of Malé. To increase the country's revenue and decrease the dependency on just tourism, Yameen also envisions that these projects will sprout a new and additional source of revenue for the economy of Maldives-medical tourism.

=== Human rights infringements ===
There were reports of large scale infringements of human rights and suppression of dissent during the presidency of Abdulla Yameen. Among them included autocratic measures like eroding freedom of association, freedom of expression, peaceful assembly, and political participation. Human rights violations included mass arbitrary arrests, flogging as punishment, abuse of women, decrees blocking opposition parties from contesting elections, the arrest of Supreme Court justices, and cracked down on the media in efforts to silence critics.

In 2014, Ahmed Rilwan, a blogger and reporter for the Maldives Independent, a newspaper that used to criticize corruption and religious extremism was abducted and murdered.

On 23 April 2017, Yameen Rasheed, a prominent Maldivian blogger, known for his satirical commentaries on the Maldivian political and religious establishment was found with 34 stab wounds in the stairwell of his apartment building in Malé. He had previously received multiple death threats which he had reported to the police, but no action was taken.

On 5 February 2018 President Abdulla Yameen declared a state of emergency and ordered the arrest of a number of politicians and officials including two judges of the Supreme Court of the Maldives, including Chief Justice of the Maldives Abdulla Saeed and former President Maumoon Abdul Gayoom. This was followed by mass arbitrary arrests of at least 141 people.

=== Alleged assassination attempt ===
On 28 September 2015, an explosion took place aboard the presidential yacht 'Finifenmaa' carrying Yameen and his wife along with top government officials from the airport island Hulhulé as it was nearing to dock at the presidential jetty, Izzuddeen Faalan in Malé. Yameen escaped unhurt, but the first lady, a presidential aide, and a bodyguard were injured. The aide suffered minor injuries, while the bodyguard sustained relatively serious injuries. The first lady sustained minor fractures to her spine, and was hospitalized for over a month.

Following the incident, government officials provided conflicting reports on the cause of the explosion. Although government officials initially pointed to a mechanical failure as a likely cause, they later claimed an international team of investigators from the U.S. FBI, Saudi Arabia, Australia, and Sri Lanka ruled out this theory. The government then declared the incident an assassination attempt.

The FBI later refuted this claim, stating they had found no conclusive evidence suggesting the blast was the result of an explosive device. An unnamed Sri Lankan official who suggested the blast was the result of a "high explosive explosion" did not provide further details, and although the Maldives' local probe commission cited Saudi Arabian investigators as saying there were signs of RDX, they provided no evidence to support that claim, nor have Saudi Arabian officials confirmed this conclusion.

It was announced that investigations revealed that the vice president, some government officials and soldiers had been involved. They all were later found guilty and charged with high treason and terrorism resulting them being sentenced to jail. Former vice president Ahmed Adeeb was found to have illegally possessed firearms to attempt a coup by eliminating senior government officials as well as masterminding the bomb plot by ordering and bribing few soldiers to plant an IED in the yacht and destroy the evidence as soon as the yacht is taken for investigation following the explosion. However the FBI investigated the blast and stated it found no evidence for an explosion cause by a bomb.

== 2018 political crisis and election ==
Yameen decided to disobey the Supreme Court order to release 9 political prisoners and reinstating 12 parliament members which would give the opposition (MDP) control of the chamber and potentially paving the way for Yameen's impeachment. On 5 February 2018 he declared a state of emergency and ordered the arrest of two judges of the Supreme Court of the Maldives, including Chief Justice of the Maldives Abdulla Saeed and Justice Ali Hameed Mohamed and former President (also his half-brother) Maumoon Abdul Gayoom.

Yameen was defeated by joint opposition candidate Ibrahim Mohamed Solih (of MDP) in 2018 presidential election held on 23 September 2018. Yameen conceded defeat in a televised statement aired next day.

== Post-presidency (2018–present) ==
=== Indictment ===
On 16 December 2018, the nation's high court seized $6.5 million in assets from Yameen. On 6 February 2019, Yameen was charged with theft, money laundering, and giving false statements to police. The investigation relates to a deal to lease tropical islands for hotel development, and an alleged payment of $1 million of government money through a private company, SOF Private Limited, into Yameen's personal bank account. Police also submitted a report to the nation's General Prosecutor's Office claiming, among other things, that Yameen gave false statements when he was being questioned.

The Criminal Court found Yameen guilty of all charges on 8 November 2019. He was sentenced to 5 years in prison with an additional fine of 5 million dollars owed to the state. The High Court upheld the jail sentence in January 2021.

The Supreme Court of Maldives later ruled in favor of an appeal lodged by Yameen, which led to his release after spending two years and two days in jail. However, the Maldives Police Service sought an order to prevent him from traveling abroad.

On 25 December 2022, the Maldives Criminal Court sentenced Yameen to 11 years in prison and fined him $5 million after finding him guilty of corruption and money laundering for charges related to receiving kickbacks from SOF Private Limited. in the lease of Vaavu atoll Aarah. He was serving his sentence in Maafushi Prison, but moved to home confinement in October 2023. On 18 April 2024, the sentence was overturned by the High Court of the Maldives, which ordered a retrial on the grounds that the 2022 hearings were “unfair”.

The Supreme Court of the Maldives changed its bench hearing the petition filed by the Prosecutor General's Office (PGO) to admit new evidence against Yameen in the retrial of the V. Aarah case.

=== 2023 presidential election ===
Since the Maldivian Criminal Court sentenced former president Abdulla Yameen to 11 years in prison shortly before the elections, the Elections Commission denied and rejected the decision to allow Abdulla Yameen to compete in the elections. This rejection came to Supreme Court and the trial was concluded on 4 August 2023. On 6 August 2023, the Maldives Supreme Court decided that Abdulla Yameen was disqualified from participating. The electoral body rejected Yameen's candidacy on 1 August 2023, citing Article 109(f) of the Constitution as the basis for its decision.

== Personal life ==
Yameen is the son of Sheikh Abdul Gayoom Ibrahim. He is married to Fathimath Ibrahim Didi and has three children, two sons and a daughter. His eldest son is Zeine Abdulla Yameen, the founder and the vice chair of the People's National Front.

Political offices
Preceded by Mohamed Waheed Hassan	President of the Maldives; 2013–2018	Succeeded by Ibrahim Mohamed Solih
