= Cabinet of the Maldives =

Senior level of the executive branch of the Government of the Maldives

- Emblem of the Maldives

- President Mohamed Muizzu's Cabinet meeting pictured in October 2026
- Headquarters: The President's Office, Henveiru, Malé, Maldives
- Members: 15
- President of the Maldives: Mohamed Muizzu
- Website: cabinet.gov.mv

The Cabinet of the Maldives (Dhivehi: ދިވެހިރާއްޖޭގެ ވަޒީރުންގެ މަޖިލިސް, romanized: dhivehiraajjeyge vazeerunge majilis) is the senior ministerial body of the executive branch of the Government of the Maldives. The President of the Maldives, who serves as both head of state and head of government, presides over the Cabinet. It assists the President in formulating and implementing state policy.

Ministerial institutions existed under the Sultanate of the Maldives before the introduction of a written constitution. The modern constitutional Cabinet was established on 22 December 1932 with the country's first codified constitution, which formally organised government into cabinet ministries. Over subsequent decades, the Cabinet operated under both monarchical and republican systems, ultimately evolving into a presidentially led executive body after the establishment of the Second Republic in 1968. Currently, the 2008 Constitution defines the Cabinet’s composition, responsibilities, and mechanisms for accountability.

The current President Mohamed Muizzu's administration has a 15-member cabinet following a restructuring of ministries on 14 April 2026.

== History ==
=== Pre-constitutional Government ===
The Maldives had forms of ministerial government before the establishment of the contemporary constitutional Cabinet in 1932. Under the Sultanate, the monarch was assisted by senior officials and ministers known as the "Furadhaana". Husnu Al Suood describes these ministers as trusted advisers of the monarch who were responsible for executing royal orders and assisting in the performance of functions of state. The number of ministers and their functions were not fixed; they varied according to customary law, the circumstances of the period, and the officials appointed by the monarch.

Historical accounts indicate that a council of ministers existed several centuries before the introduction of written constitutional government. Al Suood, drawing on the account of Ibn Battuta, describes a fourteenth-century council which included officials responsible for the treasury, collection of revenue, policing, the navy and the army. Later accounts, including that of François Pyrard de Laval in the seventeenth century, record different compositions of the ministerial council, reflecting changes in the offices and responsibilities of government over time.

One of the most senior officials of the pre-constitutional state was titled "Kilege", whom Al Suood describes as the Grand Vizier or King's Lieutenant. Appointed by the monarch, the Kilege occupied a position of considerable authority and the ministers were subordinate to the office. Other offices also performed functions resembling those later associated with a prime minister.

Following the accession of Mohamed Thakurufaanu in 1573, Ali Haji was appointed "Dhoshimeynaa Thakurufaanu", an office which Al Suood describes as that of Prime Minister and which was responsible for the day-to-day administration of the affairs of state. The use of the term "Prime Minister" in this context is a modern description of the functions of the historical office rather than evidence of a modern Parliamentary system.

By the early twentieth century, the title of Prime Minister was used for the principal minister of the Sultanate. Abdul Majeed Rannabandeyri Kilegefaanu was serving as Prime Minister when the process of drafting the Maldives' first written constitution began. In March 1931, Sultan Muhammad Shamsuddeen III appointed a constitutional drafting body, with Abdul Majeed initially serving as its president.

=== Establishment of the constitutional Cabinet, 1932 ===
The contemporary constitutional Cabinet was established on 22 December 1932, with the introduction of the country’s first codified constitution. The subsequent institutional reform formalised ministerial government within a written constitutional framework and defined the position of ministers alongside the monarch and the newly established legislature.

The first Cabinet comprised twelve ministerial portfolios held by seven ministers. Mohamed Fareed Didi, a member of the royal family, served as Prime Minister and Minister of Defence; Hassan Fareed Didi as Minister of Foreign Affairs and Minister of Finance; Ahmed Kamil Didi as Minister of Home Affairs and Minister of Education; Ibrahim Ali Didi as Minister of Health and Minister of Public Works; Mohamed Didi as Minister of Agriculture; Hussain Salahuddin as Minister of Justice; and Mohamed Amin Didi as Minister of Trade. Amin Didi, who was 22 at the time of his appointment, was the youngest person to have served as a Cabinet minister, according to the President's Office.

The 1932 Constitution also introduced mechanisms for the accountability of ministers to the legislature. Ministers were required to answer to the legislative assembly, which was empowered to question them and investigate matters concerning their official conduct. The Constitution additionally provided a procedure for motions of no confidence against individual ministers. These provisions placed the Cabinet within the wider constitutional reforms which limited the previously extensive powers of the monarch and subjected the institutions of government to a written constitutional framework.

=== Constitutional monarchy, 1932–1953 ===
The Cabinet continued to operate during a period of repeated constitutional and political change following the introduction of the first constitution. The original 1932 constitutional arrangement was short-lived, but subsequent constitutions retained forms of constitutional government and ministerial administration.

The leadership of the Cabinet changed during the later years of the Sultanate. Amin Didi, who had entered the first Cabinet as Minister of Trade, subsequently held senior positions within government and became Prime Minister before the abolition of the Sultanate in 1953.

=== The short-lived First Republic and restoration of the Sultanate, 1953–1968 ===
The abolition of the monarchy and establishment of the First Republic in 1953 reorganised the executive, with Mohamed Amin Didi becoming the first President of the Maldives. The republic lasted until 1954, when the Sultanate was restored.

Following the restoration of the monarchy, Ibrahim Ali Didi, formally titled Ibrahim Faamudheyri Kilegefaanu, headed the government as Prime Minister. He was succeeded in 1957 by Ibrahim Nasir, who remained Prime Minister for the remainder of the Sultanate.

Nasir headed the government during the final years of the British protectorate and remained Prime Minister when the Maldives obtained full independence on 26 July 1965. The constitutional monarchy continued until 1968, when the Sultanate was abolished and the Second Republic was established.

=== Second Republic, 1968–present ===
The Second Republic was established on 11 November 1968, with Ibrahim Nasir becoming President. The change transformed the structure under which the Cabinet operated, placing it within a republican executive headed by the President.

The office of Prime Minister was revived shortly during the presidency of Nasir’s, and Ahmed Zaki became Prime Minister in 1972. Zaki remained in office until 1975, when he was removed; subsequently, the position was abolished. Executive authority thereafter remained concentrated in the presidency, with the President heading the Cabinet.

Nasir was succeeded in 1978 by Maumoon Abdul Gayoom, who served as President for 30 years, until 2008. Under the 1998 Constitution, executive power was vested in the President and the Cabinet of Ministers, with the President serving as head of state and head of government and presiding over the Cabinet. The President appointed Cabinet members, who were responsible for assisting with the formulation of government policy, economic and social development, and the preparation of the state budget and proposed legislation.

Under this constitutional arrangement, ministers were individually responsible for their assigned functions and accountable to the President. The People’s Majlis, in which the President appointed a number of members, nevertheless retained a role in ministerial accountability, including the ability to pass a vote of no confidence against a Cabinet minister.

=== Constitutional reforms of 2008 ===
The adoption of the 2008 Constitution established the present constitutional framework of the Cabinet.

The Constitution introduced parliamentary approval for ministerial appointments, where the President must submit Cabinet appointments to the People’s Majlis for approval. The Constitution also defines Cabinet ministers' responsibilities in greater detail. These include assisting the President in determining and implementing state policy, advising on proposed legislation, directing and coordinating government work, managing state assets within their areas of responsibility, assisting in political, economic and social development, and protecting the rule of law, public safety and the public interest.

The first Cabinet formed following the adoption of the new Constitution took office under President Mohamed Nasheed in November 2008. Subsequent Cabinets have served under Presidents Mohamed Waheed Hassan, Abdulla Yameen, Ibrahim Mohamed Solih and Mohamed Muizzu. These successive administrations have continued to reorganise ministries and adjust their jurisdictions.

== Constitutional Framework ==
The Cabinet of the Maldives is constitutionally established under Chapter V of the Constitution of the Maldives. The Constitution provides for the appointment of Cabinet ministers by the President, defines the Cabinet's composition as including the Vice President, ministers, and the Attorney General, and requires the approval of the People's Majlis for Cabinet appointments other than that of the Vice President.

=== Composition and Appointment Process ===
The Cabinet of the Maldives consists of the Vice President of the Maldives, ministers responsible for the different ministries, and the Attorney General. Under Article 116 of the Constitution, the President has discretion to establish ministries and determine their areas of jurisdiction, subject to submission of that information to the People's Majlis (the unicameral parliament) for approval. Under Article 129, Cabinet members are appointed by the President and, except for the Vice President, those appointments require the approval of the People's Majlis. The Vice President, who is elected jointly with the President, serves as a member of the Cabinet without separate parliamentary approval.

The appointment process is set out in Article 129 is as follows:

1. The President appoints and names his Cabinet Ministers, including the Attorney General.
2. Within 7 days of the appointment, the President must submit the nominee's name to the Parliament for approval and confirmation.
3. The Parliament votes to approve or not.

=== Responsibilities and Accountability ===
The Cabinet exercises its executive authority in conjunction with the President, as outlined in Article 115(f) for the proper functioning of his office. Further, the ministers are given responsibility for each institution and authority established by the government or the Parliament, excluding independent institutions.

The Constitution outlines the general and executive authority of the Cabinet, and as under Article 132, these responsibilities include;

- To recommend and assist the president in;
  - Determining the general policies of the State in all areas of government activity and to supervise and implement such policies in accordance with the Constitution.
  - Formulating the general policies of the government in National and International matters, and to direct, review and coordinate the political, economic, and social development of the Maldives.
- To advise and recommend draft bills and proposals to the president before the preparation of submission of such bills to the parliament.
- To direct, review and coordinate any work of the Government.
- To ensure good relations and smooth functioning between the Government and other organs of the State in their areas of responsibility.
- To prudently and carefully manage any of the assets of the State that is within their areas of responsibility.
- To promote, protect and uphold rule of law, and defend public safety and the public interest.
- To perform any other duties specifically authorised by the Constitution and as required by law where parliament has enacted any such law.

The Constitution also places restrictions on Cabinet members. Under Article 136, a member of the Cabinet may not hold another public office or office of profit, engage in business or professional practice, undertake other income-generating employment, or hold a financial interest in transactions involving the State. Article 138 further requires each Cabinet member to submit an annual declaration of property, business interests, assets and liabilities to the Auditor General. Article 140 provides that a member of the Cabinet is to be made responsible for each government authority or institution, other than independent institutions, and is accountable for its operation.

Cabinet members are individually and collectively responsible to the President and also to the People's Majlis, and must provide information to the Majlis on matters under their jurisdiction when requested. Article 98 further states that the People's Majlis may require the presence of Cabinet members to answer questions posed and produce documents relating to the performance of their responsibilities.

The Addressing of Questions to Cabinet Ministers Act 2005 regulates the procedure for questioning ministers in the People's Majlis. Under the Act, ministers may be questioned on matters falling within their official responsibilities and must inform the Majlis in writing of their ministry's responsibilities within 30 days of taking office. A member wishing to question a minister must give 14 days' written notice through the Speaker. Where a question does not require detailed figures or supporting information, the minister answers orally; where detailed material is required, the minister may provide an oral summary and submit the fuller information in writing.

If a minister refuses to answer, or is alleged to have misled the Majlis, the matter may give rise to a no-confidence motion. Under Article 101 of the Constitution, such a motion must be moved by at least ten members of the People's Majlis stating the reasons, the minister must be given at least 14 days' notice, and the minister has the right to defend himself orally and in writing before the Majlis.

== President Mohamed Muizzu's Cabinet ==
Cabinet of Mohamed Muizzu's Government
Office	Office-holder	In office from	In office until	Notes
President, Commander-in-Chief of the Armed Forces	Mohamed Muizzu^{1}	17 November 2023	Incumbent	
Vice President	Hussain Mohamed Latheef	17 November 2023	Incumbent	
Attorney General	Ahmed Usham	17 November 2023	Incumbent	
Minister of Foreign Affairs	Moosa Zameer^{1}	17 November 2023	30 September 2024	
Minister of Foreign Affairs	Abdulla Khaleel	30 September 2024	14 April 2026	
Minister of Foreign Affairs	Iruthisham Adam	14 April 2026	Incumbent	
Minister of Defence and National Service	Mohamed Ghassan Maumoon	17 November 2023	14 April 2026	Served as the "Minister of Defence" until ministry renaming in April 2026.
Minister of Defence and National Service	Hassan Rasheed	14 April 2026	Incumbent	
Minister of Homeland Security, Labour and Technology	Ali Ihusaan	17 November 2023	Incumbent	Also served as the "Minister of Homeland Security & Technology" until April 2026 where the ministry was renamed.
Minister of Finance and Public Enterprises	Mohamed Shafeeq	17 November 2023	30 September 2024	Served as the "Minister of Finance"
Minister of Finance and Public Enterprises	Moosa Zameer^{1}	30 September 2024	8 June 2026	Served as the "Minister of Finance"
Minister of Finance and Public Enterprises	Hassan Zareer	8 June 2026	Incumbent	
Minister of Health, Family and Welfare	Abdulla Khaleel	17 November 2023	30 September 2024	Served as the "Minister of Health"
Minister of Health, Family and Welfare	Abdulla Nazim Ibrahim^{1}	30 September 2024	14 April 2026	Served as the "Minister of Health"
Minister of Health, Family and Welfare	Geela Ali	14 April 2026	Incumbent	
Minister of Education, Higher Education and Skills Development	Ismail Shafeeu	17 November 2023	Incumbent	Served as the "Minister of Education" until April 2026, where the ministry was merged with the higher education ministry.
Minister of Economic Development, Transport and Trade	Mohamed Saeed^{1}	17 November 2023	Incumbent	Served as the "Minister of Economic Development and Trade" until April 2026 where the ministry was merged with the transport ministry.
Minister of Fisheries, Agriculture and Ocean Resources	Ahmed Shiyam	17 November 2023	Incumbent	Served as the "Minister of FIsheries and Ocean Resources" until April 2026, where the ministry mandate was changed to include agriculture.
Minister of Islamic Affairs and Endowments	Mohamed Shaheem Ali Saeed^{1}	17 November 2023	Incumbent	Served as the "Minister of Islamic Affairs" until April 2026, where endowments were included in the ministry mandate.
Minister of Youth Empowerment, Sports and Fitness	Abdulla Rafiu	17 November 2023	Incumbent	Served as the "Minister of Sports, Fitness and Recreation" until April 2026, where the Youth ministry and the Sports ministry were merged.
Minister of Tourism and Civil Aviation	Mohamed Ameen	17 November 2023	Incumbent	Served as the "Minister of Transport and Civil Aviation" until April 2026, where the ministry mandate changed to include tourism.
Minister of Infrastructure, Housing and Urban Development	Abdulla Muththalib	17 November 2023	Incumbent	Served as the "Minister of Construction and Infrastructure" from 2023 until 2024, where he served as the "Minister of Construction, Housing and Infrastructure" until 2026.
Minister of Arts, Culture and Heritage	Adam Naseer Ibrahim	17 November 2023	14 April 2026	Served as the "Ministry of Dhivehi Language, Culture and Heritage".
Minister of Arts, Culture and Heritage	Heena Waleed	14 April 2026	Incumbent	
Minister of Climate Change, Environment and Energy	Thoriq Ibrahim^{1}	17 November 2023	1 February 2025	In 2025, the ministry was merged with the then tourism ministry
Minister of Climate Change, Environment and Energy	Ali Shareef	14 April 2026	Incumbent	
Minister of Youth Empowerment, Information and Arts	Ibrahim Waheed	17 November 2023	14 April 2026	Merged with the sports ministry
Minister of Cities, Local Government and Public Works	Adam Shareef Umar	17 November 2023	14 April 2026	Ministry abolished
Minister of Agriculture and Animal Welfare	Aishath Rameela	17 November 2023	1 December 2024	
Minister of Agriculture and Animal Welfare	Maryam Mariya	1 December 2024	26 December 2024	Acting minister
Minister of Agriculture and Animal Welfare	Maryam Mariya	26 December 2024	14 April 2026	
Minister of Social and Family Development	Aishath Shiham	17 November 2023	14 April 2026	Merged with health ministry
Ministry of Tourism	Ibrahim Faisal	17 November 2023	28 January 2025	Merged with environment ministry
Minister of Housing, Land and Urban Development	Ali Haidar Ahmed	17 November 2023	26 December 2024	Merged with construction ministry
Minister of Tourism and Environment	Thoriq Ibrahim	1 February 2025	14 April 2026	Tourism mandate changed to civil aviation ministry and re-established environment ministry
Minister of Higher Education, Labour and Skills Development	Maryam Mariya	17 November 2023	26 December 2024	
Minister of Higher Education, Labour and Skills Development	Ali Haidar Ahmed	26 December 2024	14 April 2026	Merged with education ministry

- ^{1} Previously in the cabinet of President Abdulla Yameen.

=== Parliament rejection ===
After Mohamed Muizzu appointed the members of the cabinet and sent them to the parliament, majority of the members were approved but three weren't. Ali Haidar Ahmed, Ahmed Usham, and Mohamed Shaheem were rejected by the parliament. The rejection later caused a brawl in parliament between the MPs. After the three ministers were rejected, Muizzu re-appointed them, which MPs called that Muizzu was undermining the power of the parliament. In the 20th parliament, the ministers were approved.

=== Mass Resignation over election loss and ministry merging ===
On 14 April 2026, as a result of the government's losses in the local election and including the constitutional referendum the following ten cabinet ministers resigned en masse:

- Foreign Minister Abdulla Khaleel
- Defence Minister Mohamed Ghassan Maumoon
- Health Minister Abdulla Nazim Ibrahim,
- Family Development Minister Aishath Shiham
- Local Government Minister Adam Shareef
- Agriculture and Animal Welfare Minister Maryam Mariya
- Youth Minister Ibrahim Waheed
- Tourism Minister Thoriq Ibrahim
- Higher Education Minister Ali Haidar Ahmed
- Dhivehi Language Minister Adam Naseer Ibrahim

Afterwards, Muizzu appointed four new ministers and merged the remaining ministries to fifteen. He also abolished the Ministry of Cities, Local Government and Public Works. The merged ministries were:

- Ministry of Education and Ministry of Higher Education, Labour and Skills Development
- Ministry of Health and Ministry of Social and Family Development
- Ministry of Economic Development and Trade and Ministry of Transport and Civil Aviation
- Ministry of Sports, Fitness and Recreation and Ministry of Youth Empowerment, Information and Arts
- Ministry of Fisheries and Ocean Resources and Ministry of Agriculture and Animal Welfare
- Ministry of Tourism and Environment and Ministry of Transport and Civil Aviation

Renamed ministries were:

- Ministry of Dhivehi Language, Culture and Heritage
- Ministry of Construction, Housing and Infrastructure
- Ministry of Defence

== Previous administrations ==
=== Cabinet of Ibrahim Mohamed Solih ===
Cabinet of Ibrahim Mohamed Solih's Government (Note: References:)
Office	Office-holder	In office from	In office until	Notes
President, Commander-in-Chief of the Armed Forces	Ibrahim Mohamed Solih	17 November 2018	17 November 2023	
Vice President	Faisal Naseem	17 November 2018	17 November 2023	
Attorney General	Ibrahim Riffath	17 November 2018	17 November 2023	
Minister of Foreign Affairs	Abdulla Shahid	17 November 2018	17 November 2023	
Minister of Defence	Mariya Ahmed Didi	17 November 2018	17 November 2023	
Minister of Home Affairs	Sheikh Imran Abdulla	17 November 2018	17 November 2023	
Minister of Finance	Ibrahim Ameer	17 November 2018	17 November 2023	
Minister of National Planning and Infrastructure	Mohamed Aslam	17 November 2018	11 June 2020	Ministry later renamed
Minister of Housing and Urban Development	Aminath Athifa	17 November 2018	11 June 2020	Ministry abolished
Minister of National Planning, Housing and Infrastructure	Mohamed Aslam	14 June 2020	17 November 2023	Appointed after ministry reorganisation
Minister of Health	Abdulla Ameen	17 November 2018	21 October 2020	
Minister of Health	Ahmed Naseem	22 October 2020	17 November 2023	
Minister of Education	Aishath Ali	17 November 2018	17 November 2023	
Minister of Tourism	Ali Waheed	17 November 2018	9 July 2020	
Minister of Tourism	Fayyaz Ismail	9 July 2020	6 August 2020	Acting
Minister of Tourism	Abdulla Mausoom	6 August 2020	17 November 2023	
Minister of Economic Development	Fayyaz Ismail	17 November 2018	17 November 2023	
Minister of Fisheries, Marine Resources and Agriculture	Zaha Waheed	17 November 2018	5 May 2021	
Minister of Fisheries, Marine Resources and Agriculture	Hussain Rasheed Hassan	5 May 2021	17 November 2023	
Minister of Islamic Affairs	Ahmed Zahir Ali	17 November 2018	17 November 2023	
Minister of Youth, Sports, and Community Empowerment	Ahmed Mahloof	17 November 2018	17 November 2023	
Minister of Gender, Family and Social Services	Shidhatha Shareef	17 November 2018	6 February 2020	
Minister of Gender, Family and Social Services	Aishath Mohamed Didi	9 February 2020	17 November 2023	
Minister of Transport and Civil Aviation	Aishath Nahula	17 November 2018	17 November 2023	
Minister of Environment	Hussain Rasheed Hassan	17 November 2018	5 May 2021	Ministry later renamed
Minister of Communication Science and Technology	Mohamed Maleeh Jamal	17 November 2018	1 March 2021	
Minister of Communication Science and Technology	Fayyaz Ismail	1 March 2021	5 May 2021	Acting; ministry later dissolved
Minister of Environment, Climate Change and Technology	Aminath Shauna	5 May 2021	17 November 2023	Ministry renamed
Minister of Arts, Culture, and Heritage	Yumna Maumoon	17 November 2018	17 November 2023	

=== Cabinet of Abdulla Yameen Abdul Gayoom ===
Cabinet of Abdulla Yameen Abdul Gayoom's Government (Note: References:)
Office	Office-holder	In office from	In office until	Notes
President, Commander-in-Chief of the Armed Forces	Abdulla Yameen ^{3}	17 November 2013	17 November 2018	
Vice President	Mohamed Jameel Ahmed ^{4}	17 November 2013	22 July 2015	
Vice President	Ahmed Adeeb	22 July 2015	5 November 2015	
Vice President	Abdulla Jihad	22 June 2016	17 November 2018	
Attorney General	Mohamed Anil	21 November 2013	17 November 2018	Held office of Minister of Law and Gender from 1 July 2014
Minister of Law and Gender	Mohamed Anil	1 July 2014	17 November 2018	Concurrent
Minister of Defence and National Security	Mohamed Nazim ^{1 & 8}	17 November 2013	20 January 2015	
Minister of Defence and National Security	Moosa Ali Jaleel	20 January 2015	28 October 2015	
Minister of Defence and National Security	Adam Shareef	28 October 2015	17 November 2018	
Minister of Home Affairs	Umar Naseer	19 November 2013	21 June 2016	
Minister of Home Affairs	Ahmed Zuhoor	22 June 2016	1 August 2016	Acting
Minister of Home Affairs	Azleen Ahmed	1 August 2016	17 November 2018	
Minister of Foreign Affairs	Dunya Maumoon	17 November 2013	5 July 2016	
Minister of Foreign Affairs	Mohamed Asim ^{2}	13 July 2016	17 November 2018	
Minister of Islamic Affairs	Mohamed Shaheem	17 November 2013	6 May 2015	
Minister of Islamic Affairs	Ahmed Ziyad Baqir	6 May 2015	17 November 2018	
Minister of Finance and Treasury	Abdulla Jihad ^{1}	17 November 2013	22 June 2016	
Minister of Finance and Treasury	Ahmed Munawar	22 June 2016	17 November 2018	
Minister of Education	Aishath Shiham ^{3}	21 November 2013	17 November 2018	
Minister of Health ^{7}	Mariyam Shakeela ^{2}	1 July 2014	11 August 2014	
Minister of Health ^{7}	Mohamed Nazim	11 August 2014	20 January 2015	Acting
Minister of Health ^{7}	Mohamed Shainee	21 January 2015	10 March 2015	Acting
Minister of Health ^{7}	Ahmed Zuhoor	10 March 2015	20 May 2015	10 Day Tenure
Minister of Health ^{7}	Iruthisham Adam	20 May 2015	22 June 2016	
Minister of Health ^{7}	Abdulla Nazim Ibrahim	22 June 2016	17 November 2018	
Minister of Tourism	Ahmed Adeeb ^{2}	17 November 2013	22 July 2015	
Minister of Tourism	Moosa Zameer	28 October 2015	17 November 2018	
Minister of Fisheries and Agriculture	Mohamed Shainee	19 November 2013	17 November 2018	
Minister of Economic Development	Mohamed Saeed	19 November 2013	17 November 2018	
Minister of Housing and Infrastructure	Mohamed Muizzu	19 November 2013	17 November 2018	
Minister of Environment and Energy	Thoriq Ibrahim	19 November 2013	17 November 2018	
Minister of Youth and Sports	Mohamed Maleeh Jamal ^{2}	21 November 2013	20 May 2015	
Minister of Youth and Sports	Ahmed Zuhoor	20 May 2015	22 June 2016	Acting
Minister of Youth and Sports	Iruthisham Adam	22 June 2016	17 November 2018	
Minister of Gender and Family	Aminath Zenysha Shaheed Zaki	22 June 2016	17 November 2018	
Minister of Transport and Communication ^{6}	Ameen Ibrahim	17 November 2013	29 May 2014	Ministry abolished
Ministry of Health and Gender ^{7}	Mariyam Shakeela	21 November 2013	01 July 2014	Ministry abolished

- ^{1} Previously held the post in President Dr. Mohamed Waheed Hassan Manik's cabinet respectively.
- ^{2} The officeholders held tunure of these following offices during tenure of Weehed's Administration:
  - Ahmed Adheeb Abdul Ghafoor as Minister of Tourism, Arts and Culture,
  - Dr. Mariyam Shakeela held the posts of:
    - Minister of Environment and Energy
    - Acting Minister of Foreign Affairs
    - Acting Minister of Gender, Family and Human Rights
  - Dunya Maumoon as Minister of State for Foreign Affairs
  - Mohamed Maleeh Jamal as Deputy Ministry of Tourism, Arts and Culture
- ^{3} The officeholders held tunure of these following offices during tenure of Maumoon Abdul Gayyoom's Administration:
  - Abdulla Yameen Abdul Gayoom as Minister of Tourism and Civil Aviation
  - Dr. Aishath Shiham as Minister of Youth and Sports
- ^{4} Dr. Mohamed Jameel Ahmed served various posts in the cabinets of the last previous governments. He held following offices during mentioned administrations:
    - Vice President in President Abdulla Yameen Abdul Gayoom's administration. People's Majlis, which is the legislative body of the Maldives, passed a declaration to remove Dr. Mohamed Jameel Ahmed from the post of Vice President on July 21, 2015.
    - Minister of Justice in Maumoon Abdul Gayoom's administration
    - Minister of Civil Aviation and Communication in Mohamed Nasheed's administration.
    - Minister of Home Affairs in Dr. Mohamed Waheed Hassan Manik's administration.
- ^{5} Ameen Ibrahim was sacked after the breakup of the coalition between the ruling PPM and JP. First he was asked to "stay at home" hours after the breakup of coalition on 28 May 2014, but in less than 24 hours after he was notified not to attend work, he was dismissed from his post.
- ^{6} The President abolished Ministry of Transport and Communication. Mandates were transferred as following:
  - Maldives Civil Aviation Authority and Regional Airports to the Ministry of Tourism.
  - Transport Authority to the Ministry of Economic Development.
  - Communication Authority of Maldives to the Ministry of Home Affairs.
- ^{7} The President revised the mandate of Ministry of Health and Gender and established two new ministries under the names of Ministry of Law and Gender and Ministry of Health.
  - Ministry of Law and Gender to oversee all government functions related to families, children, women, people with special needs, and human rights appointing Attorney General Uz. Mohamed Anil.
  - Ministry of Health to oversee all government functions related to health and social protection sectors. Initial appointment for Minister of Health Dr. Mariyam Shakeela was dismissed from the cabinet on 11 August 2014, following parliament's vote against approval. Mohamed Nazim was appointed as Acting Minister of Health.
- ^{8} Mohamed Nazim was dismissed two days after Maldives Police Service conducted a raid on his residence, confiscating lethal weapons. President's Office spokesperson said that the President made the decision to remove Mohamed Nazim due to the seriousness of allegations against him, and due to sensitivity of the whole matter. Mohamed Nazim denied the allegations against him stating that he didn't believe police should have raided the private residence of the government defence minister in the middle of the night and that no one was safe any longer in the country if the police could raid the country's defence minister's private residence in that manner.

=== Cabinet of Mohamed Waheed Hassan ===
Cabinet of Mohamed Waheed Hassan (Note: References:)
Office	Officeholder	In office from	In office until	Notes
President, Commander-in-Chief of the Armed Forces	Mohamed Waheed Hassan	7 February 2012	17 November 2013	
Vice President	Mohamed Waheed Deen ^{7}	25 April 2012	10 November 2013	Resigned
Attorney General	Aishath Azima Shakoor	12 February 2012	10 April 2013	
Attorney General	Aishath Bisam	10 April 2013	1 July 2013	
Attorney General	Aishath Azima Shakoor ^{5}	1 July 2013	17 November 2013	
Minister of Defence and National Security	Mohamed Nazim	8 February 2012	17 November 2013	
Minister of Home Affairs	Mohamed Jameel Ahmed ^{3}	8 February 2012	11 May 2013	
Minister of Home Affairs	Ahmed Shafeeu	11 May 2013	17 November 2013	Acting
Minister of Foreign Affairs	Abdul Samad Abdulla ^{4}	5 March 2012	25 August 2013	
Minister of Foreign Affairs	Asim Ahmed	25 August 2013	12 September 2013	Acting
Minister of Foreign Affairs	Mariyam Shakeela	12 September 2013	17 November 2013	Acting
Minister of Islamic Affairs	Mohamed Shaheem Ali Saeed	19 February 2012	17 November 2013	
Minister of Finance and Treasury	Abdulla Jihad	5 March 2012	17 November 2013	
Minister of Education	Asim Ahmed	12 February 2012	17 November 2013	
Minister of Health and Family	Ahmed Jamsheed Mohamed	12 February 2012	7 May 2012	Ministry abolished
Minister of Health	Ahmed Jamsheed Mohamed ^{6}	7 May 2012	4 November 2013	
Minister of Health	Aamaal Ali	4 November 2013	17 November 2013	Acting
Minister of Fisheries and Agriculture	Ahmed Shafeeu	12 March 2012	17 November 2013	
Minister of Transport and Communication	Ahmed Shamheed ^{1}	12 February 2012	8 November 2012	
Minister of Transport and Communication	Mohamed Nazim	8 November 2012	10 April 2013	Acting
Minister of Transport and Communication	Ameen Ibrahim	10 April 2013	17 November 2013	
Minister of Tourism, Arts and Culture	Ahmed Adeeb Abdul Ghafoor	12 February 2012	17 November 2013	
Minister of Economic Development	Ahmed Mohamed	12 February 2012	17 November 2013	
Minister of Housing and Environment	Mohamed Muizzu	19 February 2012	21 May 2012	Ministry abolished
Minister of Housing and Infrastructure	Mohamed Muizzu	21 May 2012	17 November 2013	
Minister of Human Resources, Youth and Sports	Mohamed Hussain Shareef	12 February 2012	17 November 2013	
Minister of Gender, Family and Human Rights	Fathimath Dhiyana Saeed ^{2}	7 May 2012	19 November 2012	
Minister of Gender, Family and Human Rights	Mariyam Shakeela	21 November 2012	7 March 2013	Acting
Minister of Gender, Family and Human Rights	Aishath Azima Shakoor	10 April 2013	1 July 2013	
Minister of Gender, Family and Human Rights	Aamaal Ali	9 July 2013	17 November 2013	
Minister of Environment and Energy	Mariyam Shakeela	21 May 2012	17 November 2013	

- ^{1} Minister Ahmed Shamheed was dismissed after disputes between the Government as he extended the Villa International Airport Maamigili lease to JP leader Qasim Ibrahim for 99 years.
- ^{2} Minister Fathimath Dhiyana Saeed was dismissed after criticizing the government and the police, stating that her husband, MP Abdulla Jabir, was beaten by the police and that his arrest was politically motivated.
- ^{3} Minister Mohamed Jameel Ahmed was dismissed after he became the running-mate of the then MP Abdulla Yameen, presidential candidate of PPM. Prior to dismissal, Media Secretary at the President's Office, told the press that having a rival candidate's running-mate as the Home Minister would create a conflict of interest as the President himself is contesting in the presidential elections.
- ^{4} Minister Abdul Samad Abdulla died early morning of 25 August 2013 whilst receiving treatment in Singapore.
- ^{5} Attorney General Azima Shakoor was removed office by a motion of no confidence in the People's Majlis.
- ^{6} According to the Media Secretary at the President's Office, Minister Ahmed Jamsheed Mohamed resigned to take up a job at the United Nations in Delhi.
- ^{7} Vice President Mohamed Waheed Deen resigned hours before the end of the presidential term.

=== Cabinet of Mohamed Nasheed ===
Cabinet of Mohamed Nasheed
Office	Officeholder	In office from	In office until	Notes
President, Commander-in-Chief of the Armed Forces	Mohamed Nasheed	11 November 2008	7 February 2012	
Vice President	Mohamed Waheed Hassan	11 November 2008	7 February 2012	
Attorney General	Fathimath Dhiyana Saeed	12 November 2008	19 May 2009	
Attorney General	Ali Hashim	19 May 2009	3 June 2009	Acting
Attorney General	Husnu Al Suood	3 June 2009	29 June 2010	Resigned in June 2010 en masse resignation
Attorney General	Husnu Al Suood	7 July 2010	8 August 2010	Reappointed after mass resignation
Attorney General	Ahmed Ali Sawad	12 August 2010	10 December 2010	
Attorney General	Uz. Hassan Latheef	10 December 2010	13 December 2010	Acting
Attorney General	Ahmed Ali Sawad	13 December 2010	21 March 2011	Reappointed; rejected by parliament on 21 March 2011
Attorney General	Abdulla Muiz	21 March 2011	7 February 2012	
Ministry of Defence and National Security	Ameen Faisal	12 November 2008	29 June 2010	Resigned in June 2010 en masse resignation
Ministry of Defence and National Security	Ameen Faisal	7 July 2010	10 December 2010	Resigned after parliamentary rejection
Ministry of Defence and National Security	Ahmed Muizzu Adnan	December 2010	30 June 2011	Acting
Ministry of Defence and National Security	Thalhath Ibrahim Kaleyfaanu	30 June 2011	7 February 2012	
Ministry of Home Affairs	Qasim Ibrahim	12 November 2008	4 December 2008	
Ministry of Home Affairs	Ameen Faisal	4 December 2008	3 June 2009	Acting
Ministry of Home Affairs	Mohamed Shihab	3 June 2009	29 June 2010	Resigned in June 2010 en masse resignation
Ministry of Home Affairs	Mohamed Shihab	7 July 2010	10 December 2010	Resigned after parliamentary rejection
Ministry of Home Affairs	Hassan Afeef	13 December 2010	7 February 2012	Endorsed by parliament in 2011
Ministry of Foreign Affairs	Ahmed Shaheed	12 November 2008	29 June 2010	Resigned in June 2010 en masse resignation
Ministry of Foreign Affairs	Ahmed Shaheed	7 July 2010	10 December 2010	Resigned after parliamentary rejection
Ministry of Foreign Affairs	Mohamed Aslam	14 December 2010	21 March 2011	Acting
Ministry of Foreign Affairs	Ahmed Naseem	21 March 2011	7 February 2012	Endorsed by parliament in 2011
Ministry of Islamic Affairs	Abdul Majeed Abdul Bari	12 November 2008	29 June 2010	Resigned in June 2010 en masse resignation
Ministry of Islamic Affairs	Abdul Majeed Abdul Bari	7 July 2010	4 October 2011	Resigned after coalition dispute
Ministry of Islamic Affairs	Abdul Majeed Abdul Bari	9 October 2011	7 February 2012	Reappointed
Ministry of Finance and Treasury	Ali Hashim	12 November 2008	29 June 2010	Resigned in June 2010 en masse resignation
Ministry of Finance and Treasury	Ali Hashim	7 July 2010	10 December 2010	Resigned after parliamentary rejection
Ministry of Finance and Treasury	Mahmood Razee	December 2010	10 April 2011	Acting
Ministry of Finance and Treasury	Ahmed Inaz	10 April 2011	29 December 2011	
Ministry of Finance and Treasury	Mohamed Aslam	2 January 2012	4 January 2012	Acting
Ministry of Finance and Treasury	Mohamed Shihab	4 January 2012	7 February 2012	
Ministry of Health and Family	Aminath Jameel	12 November 2008	29 June 2010	Resigned in June 2010 en masse resignation
Ministry of Health and Family	Aminath Jameel	7 July 2010	7 February 2012	Reappointed after mass resignation
Ministry of Education	Mustafa Lutfi	12 November 2008	29 June 2010	Resigned in June 2010 en masse resignation
Ministry of Education	Mustafa Lutfi	7 July 2010	10 December 2010	Resigned after parliamentary rejection
Ministry of Education	Shifa Mohamed	13 December 2010	7 February 2012	Endorsed by parliament in 2011
Ministry of Tourism, Arts and Culture	Ahmed Ali Sawad	12 November 2008	29 June 2010	Resigned in June 2010 en masse resignation
Ministry of Tourism, Arts and Culture	Ahmed Ali Sawad	7 July 2010	12 August 2010	
Ministry of Tourism, Arts and Culture	Ali Hashim	17 August 2010	8 November 2010	Acting
Ministry of Tourism, Arts and Culture	Mariyam Zulfa	8 November 2010	7 February 2012	Endorsed by parliament in 2011
Ministry of Economic Development	Mohamed Rasheed	12 November 2008	9 May 2010	
Ministry of Economic Development	Mahmood Razee	11 May 2010	7 July 2010	Acting
Ministry of Economic Development	Mahmood Razee	7 July 2010	7 February 2012	Reappointed after mass resignation
Ministry of Human Resources, Youth and Sports	Hassan Latheef	12 November 2008	29 June 2010	Resigned in June 2010 en masse resignation
Ministry of Human Resources, Youth and Sports	Hassan Latheef	7 July 2010	7 February 2012	Reappointed after mass resignation
Ministry of Fisheries and Agriculture	Ibrahim Didi	12 November 2008	29 June 2010	Resigned in June 2010 en masse resignation
Ministry of Fisheries and Agriculture	Ibrahim Didi	7 July 2010	11 December 2010	Reappointed after mass resignation
Ministry of Fisheries and Agriculture	Aminath Jameel	11 December 2010	28 March 2011	Acting
Ministry of Fisheries and Agriculture	Mohamed Aslam	28 March 2011	19 July 2011	Acting
Ministry of Fisheries and Agriculture	Ibrahim Didi	19 July 2011	7 February 2012	
Ministry of Housing, Transport and Environment	Mohamed Aslam	12 November 2008	29 June 2010	Ministry abolished on 7 July 2010
Ministry of Housing and Environment	Mohamed Aslam	7 July 2010	7 February 2012	
Ministry of Civil Aviation and Communication	Dr. Mohamed Jameel Ahmed	12 November 2008	30 May 2009	
Ministry of Civil Aviation and Communication	Mahmood Razee	3 June 2009	29 June 2010	Ministry abolished on 7 July 2010
Ministry of Transport and Communication	Mahmood Razee	8 July 2010	8 November 2010	Acting
Ministry of Transport and Communication	Mohamed Adil Saleem	8 November 2010	7 February 2012	Endorsed by parliament in 2011

==== June 2010 en masse cabinet resignation ====
On 29 June 2010, thirteen cabinet ministers resigned en masse, protesting the behaviour of opposition MPs who they said were “hijacking” the powers of the executive and making it impossible for the cabinet Ministers to discharge their constitutional duties and deliver the government's election manifesto. The ministers called on the President to investigate why certain MPs were blocking the government's work, citing allegations of corruption and bribery in parliament.

On 29 June, Maldives Police Service arrested two parliamentarians, Abdulla Yameen, leader of the People's Alliance party and Gasim Ibrahim, head of the Jumhooree Party, on suspicion of bribing fellow parliamentarians to vote against the government.

On 7 July, President Nasheed reappointed all thirteen ministers, at a ceremony held at the President's Office.

==== Parliament rejection of cabinet members ====
After the reinstallation of the cabinet on 7 July, the cabinet was sent to the parliament for endorsement.

On 22 November, the parliament voted and declared that only five out of the twelve appointees would be accepted. They also called for the rejected ministers to step down immediately. This resulted in heated arguments between ruling party MDP and opposing Dhivehi Rayyithunge Party (DRP), who holds majority seats in parliament. The parliament ruled that the rejected appointees would not be considered as ministers, and refused to allow Finance minister, Ali Hashim present the 2011 state budget for parliament approval. Members of MDP responded to this by declaring that neither parliament or supreme court had rights to dismiss ministers and threatened high members of the parliament.

On 10 December, the Supreme Court of the Maldives ruled that the ministers not endorsed by the parliament cannot remain in their posts; and requested their immediate resignation from office.

On 13 December, President Nasheed appointed two new ministers and acting ministers for 4 more offices. He also reappointed the rejected Attorney General, Ahmed Ali Sawad.

==== 2011 parliament cabinet endorsement ====
On 21 March 2011, the parliament voted on the endorsement of five new ministers appointed. The result was the endorsement of 4 ministers. These include:

- Shifa Mohamed, Minister of Education
- Hassan Afeef, Minister of Home Affairs
- Mohamed Adil Saleem, Minister of Transport and Communication.
- Dr. Mariyam Zulfa, Minister of Tourism.

Only 1 of the appointees were rejected. This was the Attorney General, Dr. Ahmed Ali Sawad, who had been re-appointed by President Nasheed after being rejected by the parliament earlier. Just hours after the endorsement, two new ministers were sworn into office. This included a new Attorney General and a new Minister of Foreign Affairs.

=== Cabinet of Maumoon Abdul Gayoom ===
Cabinet of Ministers of Maumoon Abdul Gayoom's Government
Office	Name	Term
President, Commander-in-Chief of the Armed Forces and of the Police	Maumoon Abdul Gayoom	Nov. 11, 1978 – Nov. 11, 2008
Senior Minister	Dr. Mohamed Zahir Hussain
Senior Minister	Uz. Abdulla Hameed
Senior Minister	Umar Zahir
Senior Minister	Uz. Fathulla Jameel
Senior Minister	Ali Umar Maniku
Senior Minister	His Eminence Sheikh Dr. Mohamed Rasheed Ibrahim
Dhivehi Dhaulathuge Minister	Abdul Rasheed Hussain
Dhivehi Dhaulathuge Minister	Ibrahim Hussain Manik
Dhivehi Dhaulathuge Minister	Rashida Yousuf
Dhivehi Dhaulathuge Minister	Abbas Ibrahim
Minister for Presidential Affairs	Mohamed Hussain
Ministry of Defence and National Security	Ismail Shafeeu	Sep. 1, 2004 – Nov. 12, 2008
Ministry of Foreign Affairs	Fathulla Jameel; Dr. Ahmed Shaheed; Abdulla Shahid	Mar. 14, 1978 – Jul. 14, 2005; Jul. 15, 2005 – Aug. 21, 2007; Aug. 23, 2007 – Nov. 17, 2008
Ministry of Health	Ilyas Ibrahim
Ministry of Higher Education, Employment and Social Security	Dr. Ibrahim Hassan
Ministry of Atolls Development	Ahmed Thasmeen Ali
Ministry of Finance and Treasury	Maumoon Abdul Gayoom; Arif Hilmy; Mohamed Jaleel; Qasim Ibrahim; Abdulla Jihad	Jan. 5, 1989 – Nov. 11, 1993; Nov. 11, 1993 – May 31, 2000; Sep. 1, 2004 – Jul. 14, 2005; Aug. 18, 2005 – Jul. 15, 2008; Jul. 15, 2008 – Nov. 11, 2008
Ministry of Education	Mohamed Zahir Hussain; Abdulla Hameed; Mohamed Latheef; Ismail Shafeeu; Mahamood Shougee; Zahiya Zareer	Jul. 23, 1979 - May. 30, 1990; May. 30, 1990 - Nov. 11, 1993; Nov. 11, 1993 - Oct. 9, 2002; Oct. 9, 2002 - Nov. 11, 2003; Nov. 11, 2003 - Jul. 14, 2005; Jul. 14, 2005 - Nov. 10, 2008
Ministry of Tourism and Civil Aviation	Ahmed Mujthaba; Ismail Shafeeu; Abdulla Jameel; Ibrahim Hussain Zaki; Hassan Sabir; Dr. Musthafa Luthfee; Dr. Mohamed Shaugee; Dr. Abdulla Mausoom; Abdulla Yameen Abdul Gayoom	Jan. 5, 1989 – May 29, 1990; May 30, 1990 – May 26, 1991; May 27, 1991 – Nov. 10, 1993; Nov. 11, 1993 – Nov. 10, 1998; Nov. 11, 1998 – Sep. 14, 2004; Sep. 15, 2004 – Jul. 13, 2005; Jul. 14, 2005 – Jul. 14, 2008; Jul. 15, 2008 – Sep. 29, 2008; Sep. 2008 – Nov. 2008
Ministry of Planning and National Development	Hamdun Hameed
Ministry of Youth and Sports	Dr. Aishath Shiham
Ministry of Construction and Public Infrastructure	Mohamed Mauroof Jameel
Ministry of Gender and Family	Aishath Mohamed Didi
Ministry of Home Affairs	Umar Zahir; Abdullah Jameel; Ismail Shafeeu; Umar Zahir; Ahmed Thasmeen Ali; Abdulla Kamaaluhdheen	Nov. 11, 1983 – Nov. 11, 1993; Nov. 11, 1993 – Nov. 11, 1998; Nov. 11, 1998 – Sep. 1, 2004; Sep. 1, 2004 – Jul. 14, 2005; Jul. 14, 2005 – Jun. 25, 2007; Jun. 25, 2007 – Nov. 2008
Ministry of Housing and Urban Development	Dr. Ali Haidhar Ahmed	Jul. 2008 – Oct. 2008
Ministry of Transport and Communication	Mohamed Saeed
Ministry of Environment, Energy and Water	Abdul Rasheed Hussain; Ismail Shafeeu; Ahmed Abdulla; Abdulla Mausoom	Nov. 06, 1996 – Nov. 11, 1998; Nov. 11, 2003 – Sep. 1, 2004; Jul. 14, 2005 – Aug. 31, 2008 – Aug. 29, 2008 – Nov. 11, 2008
Ministry of Legal Reform, Information and Arts	Uz. Mohamed Nasheed
Attorney General	Ahmed Zaki; Ahmed Zahir; Dr. Mohamed Munavvar; Dr. Hassan Saeed; Uza. Aishath Azima Shakoor	Nov. 11, 1983 – Feb. 22, 1990; Feb. 22, 1990 – Mar. 27, 1991; Nov. 11, 1993 – Nov. 11, 2003; Nov. 11, 2003 – Aug. 5, 2007; Oct. 31, 2007 – Nov. 11, 2008
Ministry of Trade and Economic Development	Mohamed Jaleel
