= List of ministries of the Maldives =

This is a list of ministries of the government of the Maldives.

== List ==
Ministry name		Minister	Founded	Website
English	Dhivehi	Minister	Founded	Website
Ministry of Homeland Security and Technology	ދާޚިލީ ސަލާމަތާއި މަސައްކަތްތެރިކަމާއި ފަންނިއްޔާތާ ބެހޭ ވުޒާރާ	Ali Ihusaan	1932	mohst.gov.mv
Ministry of Foreign Affairs	ޚާރިޖީ ވުޒާރާ	Iruthisham Adam	1932	foreign.gov.mv
Ministry of Defence and	ދިފާޢީ އަދި ވަޠަނީ ޚިދުމަތާ ބެހޭ ވުޒާރާ	Hassan Rasheed	1932	defence.gov.mv
Ministry of Health, Family and Welfare	ޞިއްޙަތާއި ޢާއިލާއާއި އިޖުތިމާއީ އެހީއާ ބެހޭ ވުޒާރާ	Geela Ali	2026	health.gov.mv
Ministry of Finance and Public Enterprises	މާލީކަންކަމާއި ސަރުކާރު ކުންފުނިތަކާ ބެހޭ ވުޒާރާ	Moosa Zameer	1932	finance.gov.mv
Ministry of Education, Higher Education and Skills Development	ތަޢުލީމާއި މަތީ ތަޢުލީމާއި ހުނަރުތައް ތަރައްޤީކުރުމާ ބެހޭ ވުޒާރާ	Ismail Shafeeu	1965	moe.gov.mv
Ministry of Economic Development, Transport and Trade	އިގުތިސާދީ ތަރައްޤީއާއި ދަތުރުފަތުރާއި ވިޔަފާރިއާ ބެހޭ ވުޒާރާ	Mohamed Saeed	2023	trade.gov.mv/en
Ministry of Fisheries and Ocean Resources	މަސްވެރިކަމާއި ދަނޑުވެރިކަމާއި ކަނޑުގެ ވަސީލަތްތަކާ ބެހޭ ވުޒާރާ	Ahmed Shiyam	2018	fisheries.gov.mv
Ministry of Islamic Affairs and Endowments	އިސްލާމީކަންތައްތަކާއި އައުޤާފާ ބެހޭ ވުޒާރާ	Mohamed Shaheem Ali Saeed	1996	islamicaffairs.gov.mv
Ministry of Youth Empowerment, Sports and Fitness	ޒުވާނުން ބާރުވެރިކުރުވުމާއި ކުޅިވަރާއި ހަށިހެޔޮކަމާ ބެހޭ ވުޒާރާ	Abdulla Rafiu	2026	sports.gov.mv/en
Ministry of Tourism and Civil Aviation	ފަތުރުވެރިކަމާއި މަދަނީ އުދުހުންތަކާ ބެހޭ ވުޒާރާ	Mohamed Ameen	2026	tourism.gov.mv
Ministry of Infrastructure, Housing and Urban Development	ބިނާރާއި ގެދޮރުވެރިކަމާއި އުމްރާނީ ތަރައްޤީއާ ބެހޭ ވުޒާރާ	Abdulla Muththalib	2023	infrastructure.gov.mv
Ministry of Arts, Culture and Heritage	ފަންނާއި ސަގާފަތާއި ތަރިކައާ ބެހޭ ވުޒާރާ	Heena Waleed	2026	mdlch.gov.mv
Ministry of Climate Change, Environment and Energy	މޫސުމީ ބަދަލުތަކާއި ތިމާވެއްޓާއި ހަކަތައާ ބެހޭ ވުޒާރާ	Ali Shareef	2026	environment.gov.mv
