= Special Cabinet Committee on Middle East Tensions =

Government committee in the Maldives

Agency overview
- Formed: 28 February 2026
- Jurisdiction: Government of the Republic of Maldives
- Headquarters: Malé, Maldives
- Agency executive: Abdulla Khaleel, Chairperson
- Parent agency: Cabinet of the Maldives

The Maldives’ Special Cabinet Committee on Middle East Tensions is an ad hoc government committee established by President Mohamed Muizzu on 28 February 2026. It was formed amid a sharp escalation of the Iran–Israel proxy conflict, with the stated purpose of coordinating joint measures to assist Maldivian citizens and interests affected by regional instability. In announcing the committee, the President’s Office emphasized that its role was “to implement joint measures to address any difficulties Maldivians may face” due to the unfolding Middle East situation. The committee operates under the Cabinet of the Maldives.

== Background ==
In the late February 2026, the Middle East saw renewed hostilities between Israel and Iran. On 28 February, the United States and Israel launched coordinated strikes against targets in Iran, prompting Iran to retaliate with missile attacks on Israel and neighboring Gulf countries. Reuters reported that these strikes aimed at Iranian leadership and military assets triggered panic in Iran and raised fears of a wider regional war. The disruption included closures of airspace and flight cancellations, and several countries began withdrawing embassy dependents or issuing travel warnings.

The Maldives government publicly expressed concern over the escalation. On 28 February the Ministry of Foreign Affairs issued a statement calling for immediate de-escalation, condemning all attacks, and underscoring respect for the sovereignty of nations. Earlier, in 2025 the Maldives had formally “strongly condemn the Israeli aggression against the Islamic Republic of Iran” and urged global action to prevent further destabilization. Similarly, President Muizzu’s administration has taken a pro-Palestinian stance: in April 2025 it banned entry to Israeli passport holders (in June 2024 the government established a cabinet subcommittee to implement that ban) as part of solidarity with Palestinians. These actions signaled the government’s vigilance regarding Middle Eastern conflicts in general.

By late February 2026, Maldivian authorities were issuing safety advisories for their citizens abroad. The Foreign Ministry urged Maldivians living in the Middle East to exercise caution amid “escalating tensions and ongoing military operations” and to stay in touch with local embassies. The Maldives Airports Company Limited (MACL) also warned travelers that airspace closures could affect flights, advising passengers to check airline updates before travel., Over more than 2,000 tourists mostly from Europe were stranded at Velana International Airport. as Dubai and Doha are key transit points for tourist from Europe and other regions visiting Maldives. These precautions set the stage for the government’s decision to formalize inter-ministerial coordination through the Special Cabinet Committee.

== Establishment and Composition ==
President Muizzu officially formed the committee on 28 February 2026, as announced in the President’s Office press release. The announcement (posted on social media and press channels) made clear the committee was created “in response to the ongoing tensions in the Middle East” According to the President’s Chief Spokesperson, Heena Waleed, the committee’s mandate is to coordinate the national response to coordinate solutions for rising essential goods and fuel prices amid economic pressures and ensure that any hardship faced by Maldivians can be addressed through timely measures.

The membership of the committee spans key ministries. It is chaired by the Minister of Foreign Affairs, Dr. Abdulla Khaleel

The inclusion of these ministers indicates the committee will draw on diplomatic, defence, economic, and security portfolios. The cabinet-level composition underscores that the committee is part of the existing Cabinet of the Maldives, convened specifically to address the regional crisis.

=== Members ===
- Dr. Abdulla Khaleel, Minister of Foregin Affairs – Chair
- Ghassan Maumoon, Minister of Defence
- Moosa Zameer, Minister of Finance and Planning
- Mohamed Saeed, Minister of Economic Development and Trade
- Mohamed Ameen, Minister of Transport and Civil Aviation
- Ali Ihusaan, Minister of Homeland Security and Technology
- Thoriq Ibrahim, Minister of Tourism and Environment
- Ali Haidar Ahmed, Minister of Higher Education, Labour and Skills Development
- Mohamed Shaheem, Minister of Islamic Affairs

== See also ==
- Iran–Israel proxy conflict
- Cabinet of the Maldives
- Foreign relations of the Maldives
