= Cabinet of Ibrahim Mohamed Solih =

Government of the Maldives from 2018 to 2023

Solih Cabinet
- Cabinet of the Maldives

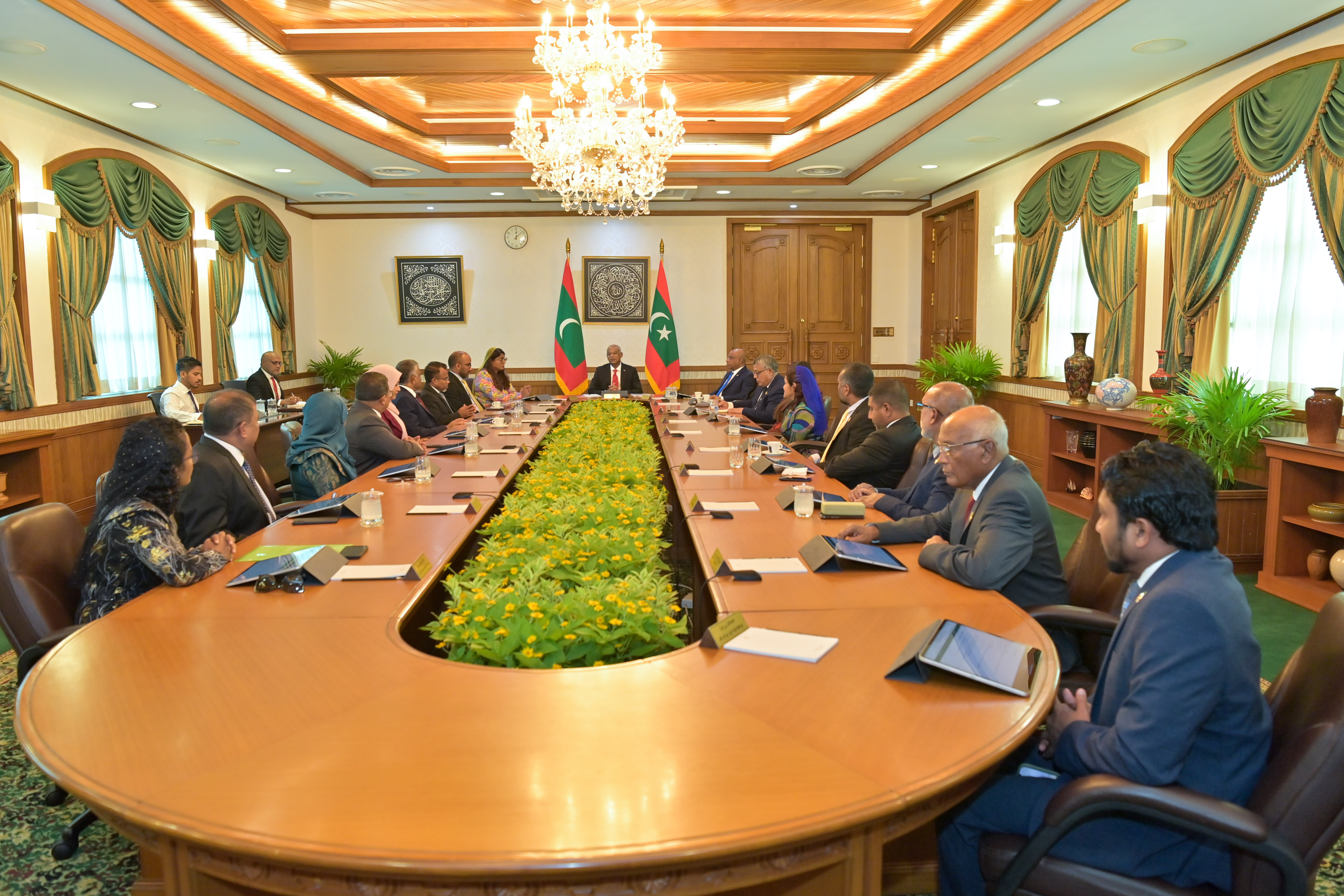
- Cabinet of President Solih in November 2023
- Date formed: 17 November 2018
- Date dissolved: 17 November 2023

People and organisations
- President: Ibrahim Mohamed Solih
- President's history: Member of the People's Majlis (Hinnavaru; 2009–2018); Member of the People's Majlis (Lhaviyani Atoll; 1995–2009)
- Vice President: Faisal Naseem
- No. of ministers: 18 (including AG)
- Ministers removed: 5 resigned 1 dismissed
- Member parties: Maldivian Democratic Party; Jumhooree Party; Adhaalath Party
- Status in legislature: Majority government (2019–2023)
- Opposition parties: Progressive Party of Maldives; People's National Congress
- Opposition leader: Abdulla Yameen (2018–2023); Mohamed Muizzu (2023)

History
- Election: 2018 presidential election
- Advice and consent: People's Majlis
- Predecessor: Yameen Cabinet
- Successor: Muizzu Cabinet

The Cabinet of Ibrahim Mohamed Solih was the most senior level of the executive branch of the government of the Maldives from 2018 to 2023. The cabinet ministers were appointed following Ibrahim Mohamed Solih's inauguration as president.

Ibrahim Mohamed Solih assumed office as President of the Maldives on 17 November 2023. The cabinet ministers were also appointed on 17 November 2023.

== Overview ==
President Solih's administration originally comprised up of 19 ministers along with the Attorney General in the cabinet. The positions were distributed among politicians representing various political factions. Following the appointments of ministers, Solih submitted the names of ministers to the People's Majlis for approval.

On 11 June 2020, Ibrahim Mohamed Solih dissolved the Ministry of Housing and Urban Development, along with the dissolution, the Ministry of National Planning and Infrastructure was renamed to the Ministry of National Planning, Housing and Infrastructure.

On 5 May 2021, the Ministry of Communications, Science and Technology was dissolved and the president renamed the Ministry of Environment to the Ministry of Environment, Climate Change and Technology.

=== Composition ===
Cabinet of Ministers of Ibrahim Mohamed Solih's Government
Position	Portrait	Name	Term in office		Ref
Position	Portrait	Name	Took office	Left office	Ref
President, Commander-in-Chief of the Armed Forces		Ibrahim Mohamed Solih	17 November 2018	17 November 2023	
Vice President		Faisal Naseem	17 November 2018	17 November 2023	
Attorney General		Ibrahim Riffath	17 November 2018	17 November 2023	
Minister of Foreign Affairs		Abdulla Shahid	17 November 2018	17 November 2023	
Minister of Defence		Mariya Ahmed Didi	17 November 2018	17 November 2023	
Minister of Home Affairs		Sheikh Imran Abdulla	17 November 2018	17 November 2023	
Minister of Finance		Ibrahim Ameer	17 November 2018	17 November 2023	
Minister of National Planning, Housing and Infrastructure		Mohamed Aslam	17 November 2018	17 November 2023	
Minister of Health		Ahmed Naseem	22 October 2020	17 November 2023	
Minister of Education		Aishath Ali	17 November 2018	17 November 2023	
Minister of Tourism		Abdulla Mausoom	6 August 2020	17 November 2023	
Ministry of Economic Development		Fayyaz Ismail	17 November 2018	17 November 2023	
Minister of Fisheries, Marine Resources and Agriculture		Hussain Rasheed Hassan	5 May 2021	17 November 2023	
Minister of Islamic Affairs		Ahmed Zahir Ali	17 November 2018	17 November 2023	
Minister of Youth, Sports, and Community Empowerment		Ahmed Mahloof	17 November 2018	17 November 2023	
Minister of Gender, Family, and Social Services		Aishath Mohamed Didi	9 February 2020	17 November 2023	
Minister of Transport and Civil Aviation		Aishath Nahula	17 November 2018	17 November 2023	
Minister of Environment, Climate Change and Technology		Aminath Shauna	5 May 2021	17 November 2023	
Minister of Arts, Culture, and Heritage		Yumna Maumoon	17 November 2018	17 November 2023	

=== Former ministers ===
Position	Portrait	Name	Term in office		Replacement	Ref
Position	Portrait	Name	Took office	Left office	Replacement	Ref
Minister of Communication Science and Technology		Mohamed Maleeh Jamal	17 November 2018	1 March 2021	Fayyaz Ismail (acting), later dissolved	
Minister of Health		Abdulla Ameen	17 November 2018	21 October 2020	Mohamed Aslam (acting), Ahmed Naseem	
Minister of Tourism		Ali Waheed	17 November 2018	9 July 2020	Fayyaz Ismail (acting), Abdulla Mausoom	
Minister of Fisheries, Marine Resources and Agriculture		Zaha Waheed	17 November 2018	5 May 2021	Hussain Rasheed Hassan	
Minister of Environment		Hussain Rasheed Hassan	17 November 2018	5 May 2021	Aminath Shauna	
Minister of Housing and Urban Development		Aminath Athifa	17 November 2018	11 June 2020	None, as the ministry was dissolved.	
Minister of Gender, Family and Social Services		Shidhatha Shareef	17 November 2018	6 February 2020	Aishath Mohamed Didi	
