= Ministry of Youth Empowerment, Sports and Fitness =

Maldivian government ministry

- ޒުވާނުން ބާރުވެރިކުރުވުމާއި ކުޅިވަރާއި ހަށިހެޔޮކަމާ ބެހޭ ވުޒާރާ Zuvaanun Baaruverikurumaai Kulhivaraai Hashiheyokamaa Behey Vuzaaraa

Ministry overview
- Formed: 17 November 2023
- Jurisdiction: Government of the Maldives
- Headquarters: Velaanage, Malé, Maldives
- Ministry executive: Abdulla Rafiu, Minister of Youth Empowerment, Sports and Fitness
- Website: sports.gov.mv

The Ministry of Youth Empowerment, Sports and Fitness (Dhivehi: ޒުވާނުން ބާރުވެރިކުރުވުމާއި ކުޅިވަރާއި ހަށިހެޔޮކަމާ ބެހޭ ވުޒާރާ) is a Maldivian government ministry tasked with the responsibility of promoting sports, recreational events, uniting and empowering youth across the Maldives.

== Ministers ==
No.	Portrait	Name (born-died)	Term			Political party	Government	Ref.
No.	Portrait	Name (born-died)	Took office	Left office	Time in office	Political party	Government	Ref.
Ministry of Human Resources, Youth and Sports
1	Hassan Latheef	Hassan Latheef	12 November 2008	29 June 2010	1 year, 229 days	SLP	Nasheed	
1	Hassan Latheef	Hassan Latheef	07 July 2010	07 February 2012	1 year, 215 days	MDP	Nasheed	
2	Mohamed Hussain Shareef	Mohamed Hussain Shareef (born 1977)	12 February 2012	17 November 2013	1 year, 278 days	DRP	Waheed	
Ministry of Youth and Sports
3	Mohamed Maleeh Jamal	Mohamed Maleeh Jamal (born 1978)	17 November 2013	20 May 2015	1 year, 184 days	JP	Yameen	
4	Ahmed Zuhoor	Ahmed Zuhoor	20 May 2015	22 June 2016	1 year, 33 days	?	Yameen	
5	Iruthisham Adam	Iruthisham Adam	22 June 2016	17 November 2018	2 years, 148 days	?	Yameen	
Ministry of Youth, Sports, and Community Empowerment
6	Ahmed Mahloof	Ahmed Mahloof (born 1980)	17 November 2018	17 November 2023	5 years, 0 days	MDP	Solih	
Ministry of Sports, Fitness and Recreation
7	Abdulla Rafiu	Abdulla Rafiu	17 November 2023	14 April 2026	2 years, 148 days	?	Muizzu	
Ministry of Youth Empowerment, Sports and Fitness
7	Abdulla Rafiu	Abdulla Rafiu	14 April 2026	Incumbent	159 days	?	Muizzu	
