= Fayyaz Ismail =

Maldivian politician (born 1974)

- ފައްޔާޒު އިސްމާއިލް
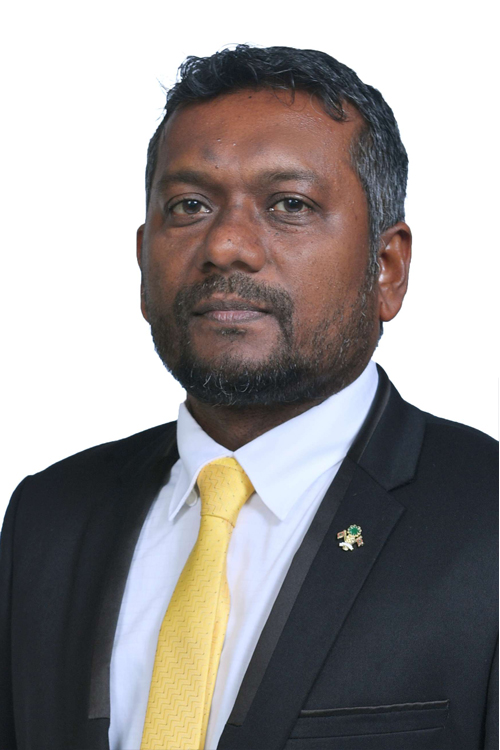
- Official portrait, 2018

Chairperson of the Maldivian Democratic Party
- In office 23 May 2022 – 23 November 2025
- Preceded by: Hassan Latheef

Minister of Economic Development
- In office 17 November 2018 – 17 November 2023
- President: Ibrahim Mohamed Solih
- Preceded by: Mohamed Saeed
- Succeeded by: Mohamed Saeed

Member of the People's Majlis
- In office 28 May 2014 – 17 November 2018
- President: Abdulla Yameen
- Succeeded by: Mohamed Visam
- Constituency: Gan

Personal details
- Party: Maldivian Democratic Party (2003–2008; 2011–present)
- Other political affiliations: Social Liberal Party (2008–2011)
- Children: 2
- Parent: Ismail Naseer
- Education: Middlesex University

Fayyaz Ismail (Dhivehi: ފައްޔާޒު އިސްމާއިލް) is a Maldivian politician and lawyer who served as the minister of economic development of the Maldives from 2018 to 2023. A member of the Maldivian Democratic Party, he served as the chairperson of the party from 2022 until his resignation in 2025. He also served as the member of the People's Majlis for the L. Gan constituency from 2014 until 2018, to become minister.

== Education ==
Ismail holds a Bachelor of Laws from Middlesex University.

== Career ==
=== Early career ===
In 2009, Ismail served as a non-executive director of Dhiraagu. He also sat on the employment advisory board of the Ministry of Human Resources. He was a managing partner at Aequitas Legal Consultants.

=== Political career ===
Ismail was a member of the Social Liberal Party from 2008, until he joined the Maldivian Democratic Party (MDP) in 2011.

==== Member of the 18th People's Majlis (2014–2018) ====
Ismail was elected to the 18th People's Majlis as the representative for the L. Gan constituency following a victory over incumbent Yoosuf Abdul Ghafoor during the 2014 parliamentary election.

In 2015, Ismail was arrested and detained, alongside MDP Vice President Mohamed Shifaz, National Council Member and former MP Ilyas Labeeb and 23 others at the 2015 May Day protests calling for the release of opposition MDP's president Mohamed Nasheed, who had been convicted of terrorism in the midst of a crackdown on political opposition and dissent by President Abdulla Yameen.

==== Minister of Economic Development (2018–2023) ====
After Ibrahim Mohamed Solih was sworn in as the president of the Maldives, Ismail was appointed as the Minister of Economic Development on 17 November 2018.

Among the policies enacted during his tenure, Ismail was responsible for the formation of a minimum wage board, through which the Maldives' first minimum wage was established on 8 November 2021, and instituted at the start of 2022. Despite being a landmark bill for labour rights in the Maldives, the policy has been criticized for excluding migrant workers, who remain among the most vulnerable populations in the Maldives.

Ismail also oversaw development of the Industrial Relations and Occupational Health and Safety bills passed in 2023, codifying the right to take industrial action, freedom to form trade unions, and protections for freedom of speech, as well as setting guidelines for establishing workplace safety, and mechanisms for compensating injured workers. He has also been credited with the largest scale regularization and repatriation of undocumented foreign workers, with more than 40,000 undocumented laborers registering with the Maldivian government in 2020. However, Ismail has come under criticism with regard to the ballooning foreign debt of the Maldives, caused in considerable part due to external shocks such as the Russia-Ukraine war, and the COVID-19 pandemic.

Ismail was appointed as the interim Minister of Tourism on 9 July 2020 following Ali Waheed's dismissal due to allegations of sexual harassment and assault from employees. Ismail was succeeded by Abdulla Mausoom. Ismail served as the interim Minister of Communications, Science and Technology in March 2021 after the People's Majlis (parliament) passed a no confidence vote against incumbent Minister Mohamed Maleeh Jamal. The Ministry was later dissolved in May with functions being transferred to the Ministry of Climate Change, Environment and Energy.

==== Chairperson of the Maldivian Democratic Party ====
On 23 May 2022, Ismail was elected as the Chairperson of the Maldivian Democratic Party. He was elected following a landslide victory.

In 2025, Ismail resigned as the chairperson of the party. In his resignation letter, Ismail noted that he resigned due to his interest to take part in the 2028 presidential election.
