= Ali Shareef (minister) =

Maldivian government official

- ޢަލީ ޝަރީފް
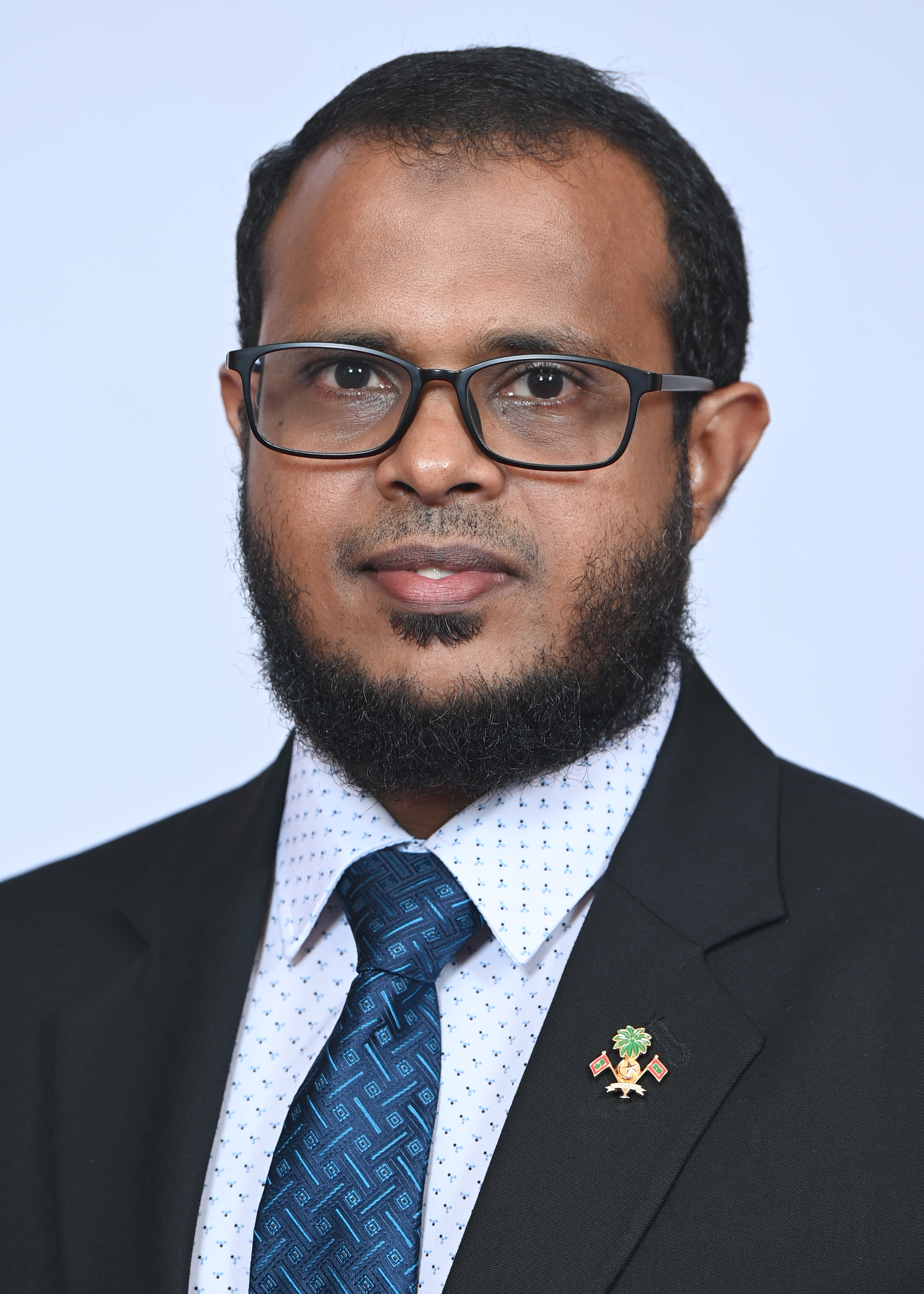
- Official portrait, 2026

Minister of Climate Change, Environment and Energy
- Incumbent
- Assumed office 14 April 2026
- President: Mohamed Muizzu
- Preceded by: Thoriq Ibrahim

Ali Shareef is a Maldivian politician who served as Minister of Climate Change, Environment and Energy since 2026.

== Career ==
Shareef previously served as the Muizzu administration's Special Envoy for Climate Change and years as a Director at the Environment Ministry. He represented the Maldives at the 2025 United Nations Climate Change Conference.

Shareef was appointed by President Mohamed Muizzu as the Minister of Climate Change, Environment and Energy.

== Controversy ==
After his appointment, Shareef faced backlash over resurfaced tweets where he mocked former MP Ibrahim Ismail's disability and called former President Mohamed Nasheed an apostate. His posts also labelled Indian Prime Minister Narendra Modi a terrorist.
