= Ministry of Climate Change, Environment and Energy =

Ministry tasked with preserving Maldivian ecosystems, etc.

- މޫސުމީ ބަދަލުތަކާއި ތިމާވެށްޓާއި ހަކަތައާ ބެހޭ ވުޒާރާ Moosumeee Badhaluthakaai Thimavehtaai Hakatha-aa Behey Vuzaaraa

Ministry overview
- Formed: 17 November 2023 14 April 2026 - re-established
- Dissolved: 1 February 2025 - merged with Ministry of Tourism
- Jurisdiction: Government of the Maldives
- Headquarters: Dharubaaruge, Malé, Maldives
- Ministry executive: Ali Shareef, Minister of Climate Change, Environment and Energy
- Website: environment.gov.mv

The Ministry of Climate Change, Environment and Energy (Dhivehi: މޫސުމީ ބަދަލުތަކާއި ތިމާވެށްޓާއި ހަކަތައާ ބެހޭ ވުޒާރާ) is a Maldivian government ministry tasked with safeguarding and preserving the Maldives ecosystems and biodiversity as well as promoting sustainable energy resources.

It was headquartered in Dharubaaruge following the Maldives government buildings fire.

In February 2025, the ministry was merged into the Ministry of Tourism and formed the Ministry of Tourism and Environment.

In April 2026, it was re-established as a separate entity.

== Ministers ==
No.	Portrait	Name (born-died)	Term			Political party	Government	Ref.
No.	Portrait	Name (born-died)	Took office	Left office	Time in office	Political party	Government	Ref.
1	Abdul Rasheed Hussain	Abdul Rasheed Hussain (born 1946)	6 November 1996	11 November 1998	2 years, 5 days	?	Gayoom	
2	Ismail Shafeeu	Ismail Shafeeu (born 1956)	11 November 2003	1 September 2004	295 days	?	Gayoom	
3	Ahmed Abdulla	Ahmed Abdulla	14 July 2005	31 August 2008	3 years, 48 days	?	Gayoom	
4	Abdulla Mausoom	Abdulla Mausoom (born 1967)	29 August 2008	11 November 2008	75 days	DRP	Gayoom	
5	Mohamed Aslam	Mohamed Aslam	12 November 2008	8 February 2012	3 years, 88 days	MDP	Nasheed	
6	Mohamed Muizzu	Mohamed Muizzu (born 1978)	19 February 2012	21 May 2012	92 days	PPM	Waheed	
7	Mariyam Shakeela	Mariyam Shakeela (born 1961)	21 May 2012	17 November 2013	1 year, 180 days	?	Waheed	
8	Thoriq Ibrahim	Thoriq Ibrahim (born 1969)	19 November 2013	17 November 2018	4 years, 363 days	PPM	Yameen	
9	Hussain Rasheed Hassan	Hussain Rasheed Hassan	17 November 2018	5 May 2021	2 years, 169 days	JP	Solih	
10	Aminath Shauna	Aminath Shauna (born 1985)	5 May 2021	17 November 2023	2 years, 196 days	MDP	Solih	
11	Thoriq Ibrahim	Thoriq Ibrahim (born 1969)	17 November 2023	1 February 2025	1 year, 76 days	PNC	Muizzu	
12	Ali Shareef	Ali Shareef	14 April 2026	Incumbent	105 days	?	Muizzu	
