= Mahmood Razee =

Maldivian politician

Minister of Economic Development
- In office 7 July 2010 – 7 February 2012
- President: Mohamed Nasheed
- Preceded by: Mohamed Rasheed
- Succeeded by: Ahmed Mohamed

Minister of Civil Aviation and Communication
- In office 2 June 2009 – 29 June 2010
- President: Mohamed Nasheed
- Preceded by: Mohamed Jameel Ahmed

Mahmood Razee (Note: It's unclear whether his name is spelled as 'Mahmood Razi' or 'Mahmood Razee' as The President's Office uses both. Although, according to Nasheed's cabinet his name is spelled as 'Mahmood Razee' so this article will use that spelling to avoid confusion.) is a Maldivian politician who served as the Minister of Economic Development from 2010 to 2012. He served as the Minister of Civil Aviation and Communication from 2009 to 2010. He also served as the Minister of State for Civil Aviation and Communication.

== Career ==
In November 2008, Razee was appointed by president Mohamed Nasheed as the Minister of State for Civil Aviation and Communication. Later in 2009, Razee was sworn in as the Minister of Civil Aviation and Communication.

In 2010, Razee was appointed as the Minsiter of Economic Development.

Before his appointment as Minister of Economic Development in 2010, he also served as the acting Minister of Economic Development. He also served as acting Minister of Transport and Communication and acting Minister of Finance and Treasury.
