= Ibrahim Faisal =

Maldivian politician (born 1986)

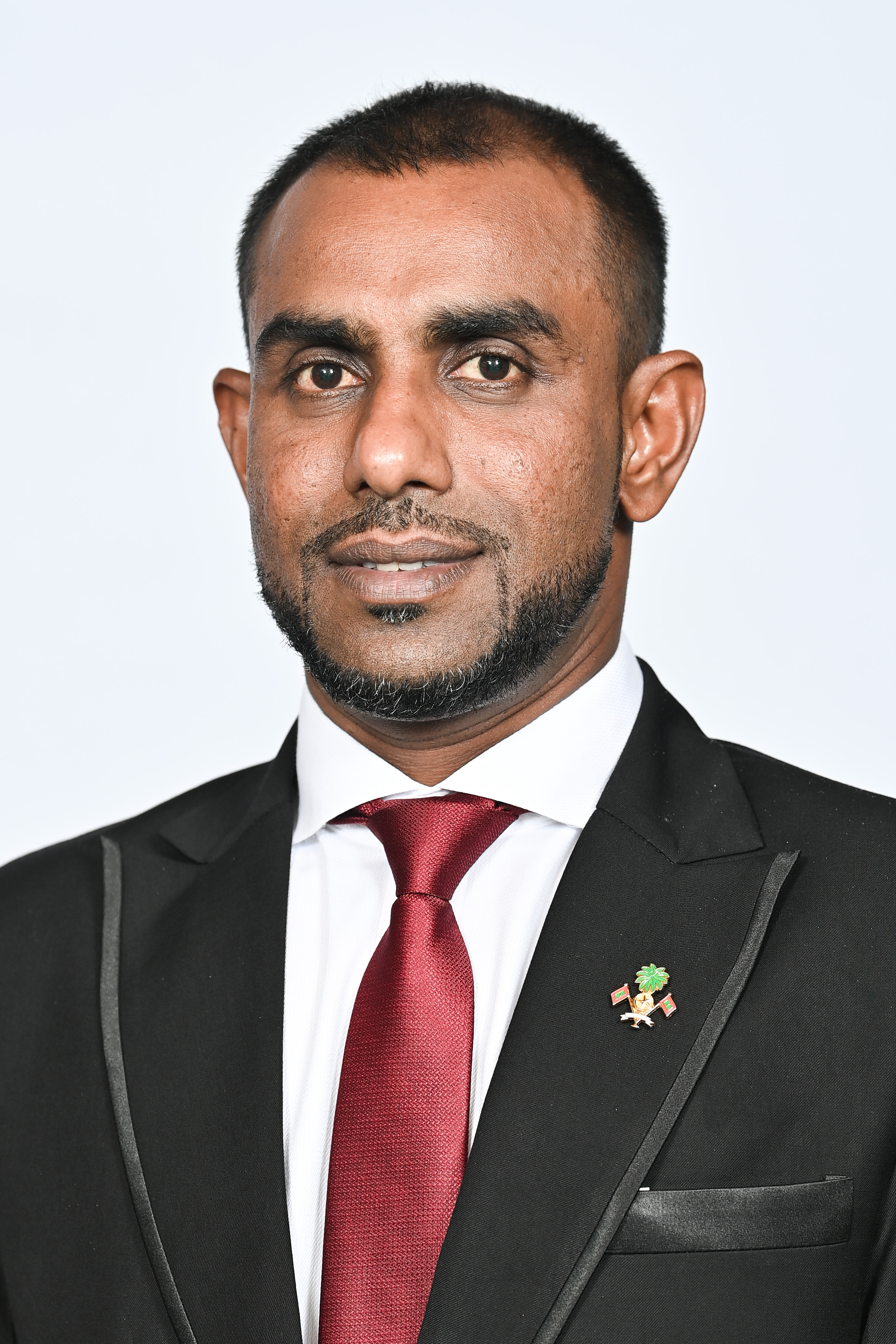

Minister of Tourism
- In office 17 November 2023 – 28 January 2025
- President: Mohamed Muizzu
- Preceding: Abdulla Mausoom
- Succeeded by: Thoriq Ibrahim

Deputy Minister of Youth & Sports
- In office 2013–2015
- President: Abdulla Yameen

Personal details
- Born: 18 July 1986 (age 40) Fonadhoo, Laamu Atoll, Maldives
- Parent(s): Abdul Raheem Abdulla (father); Dhiyana Hussain (mother)

Ibrahim Faisal (born 18 July 1986) is a Maldivian politician who served as the minister of tourism of the Maldives from 2023 to 2025. He previously served as deputy minister in the Ministry of Youth and Sports from 2013 to 2015. He also served as an additional secretary at the High Commission of Maldives in Malaysia from 2015 to 2018.

== Personal life ==
Faisal is the son of Abdul Raheem Abdulla, who was MP for Fonadhoo constituency as well as the deputy leader of the Progressive Party of Maldives (PPM).

Faisal holds a First Degree in Business Management, his thesis focusing on tourism.
