= Aminath Athifa =

Maldivian politician

- އާމިނަތު ޢާޠިފާ
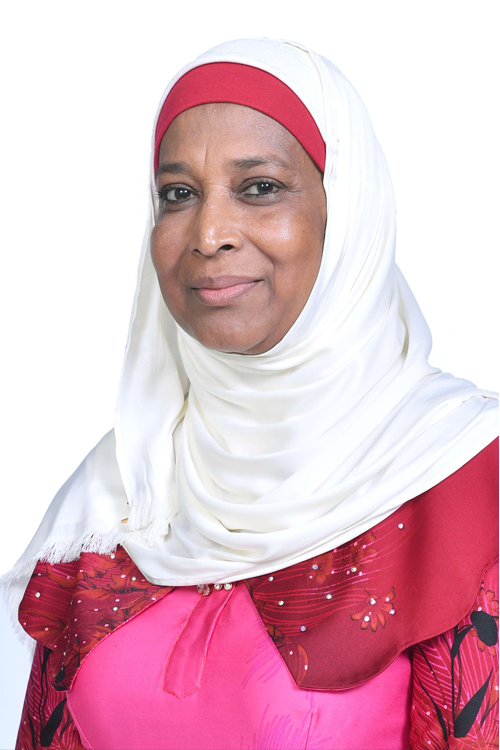
- Official portrait, 2018

Minister of Housing and Urban Development
- In office 17 November 2018 – 11 June 2020
- President: Ibrahim Mohamed Solih
- Succeeded by: (Ministry abolished)

Minister of State for Housing and Infrastructure
- In office 5 December 2013 – 17 November 2018
- President: Abdulla Yameen

Chairperson of the Maldives Transport and Contracting Company
- In office 6 May 2012 – 24 December 2013
- President: Mohamed Waheed Hassan
- Succeeded by: Iqbal Adam

Personal details
- Party: Reform (2019–2023; 2024–2025); Progressive (until 2016)
- Relations: Aishath Azima Shakoor (sister)
- Education: Loughborough University

Aminath Athifa Shakoor (Dhivehi: އާމިނަތު ޢާޠިފާ ޝަކޫރު) is a Maldivian politician who served as the minister of housing and urban development from 2018 to 2020.

== Early life and education ==
Shakoor was born on 1 January, her sister is Aishath Azima Shakoor.

Shakoor studied at Loughborough University and did her master's degree in urban engineering. She has a postgraduate diploma from the Institute for Housing and Urban Development Studies.

== Career ==
Shakoor had been working in the government since 1982. She held senior positions within the Ministry of Housing and Infrastructure, including deputy executive director. She served as a member of the board of directors at the Maldives Transport and Contracting Company (MTCC) from 2004 to 2006. Eventually, Shakoor served as the chairperson of MTCC from 2012 to 2013.

In 2013, Shakoor was appointed by President Abdulla Yameen as the minister of state for housing and infrastructure. Shakoor was also serving as the registrar of the Progressive Party of Maldives (PPM).

In 2016, Shakoor was expelled from PPM in part of an internal feud between Abdulla Yameen and Maumoon Abdul Gayoom, which Shakoor supporting Maumoon.

In 2018, Shakoor was appointed by President Ibrahim Mohamed Solih as the minister of housing and urban development. She was elected to this position on a slot given to the Maldives Reform Movement (MRM), led by Maumoon Abdul Gayoom. She was also appointed as a member of the Economic Council.

Shakoor's asset disclosure in 2019 was criticized as incomplete by NGO Transparency Maldives as she declared an income of Rf. 90,000 without reporting a source.

In 2020, Shakoor submitted her resignation to President Solih, citing health reasons. Following this, President Solih dissolved the Ministry of Housing and Urban Development and merged it with the Ministry of National Planning and Infrastructure. Maumoon Abdul Gayoom described Shakoor's resignation as a huge loss.
