= Ministry of Islamic Affairs =

A Ministry of Islamic Affairs is a Ministry found in certain Islamic countries that is responsible for advising the government on religious matters, and particularly on efforts to conform government efforts to the requirements of Islam.

Examples include:

- Ministry of Islamic Affairs (Afghanistan)
- Ministry of Islamic Affairs (Maldives)
- Ministry of Awqaf and Islamic Affairs (Qatar)
- Ministry of Islamic Affairs, Dawah, and Guidance (Saudi Arabia)
