= Ali Waheed =

Maldivian politician (born 1984)

- ޢަލީ ވަޙީދު
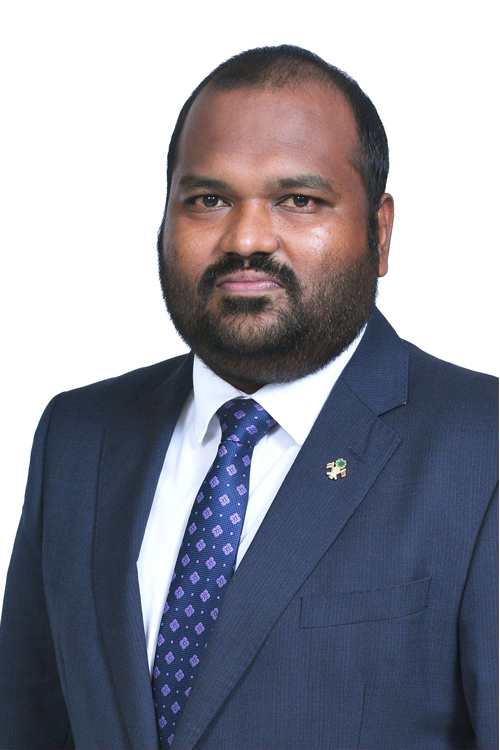
- Official portrait, 2018

Minister of Tourism
- In office November 17, 2018 – July 9, 2020
- President: Ibrahim Mohamed Solih
- Preceded by: Moosa Zameer
- Succeeded by: Abdulla Mausoom

Chairperson of Maldivian Democratic Party
- In office August 30, 2014 – May 2016

Deputy PG Leader of Maldivian Democratic Party
- In office 2013–2014

Member of People's Majlis
- In office 2009–2014
- Constituency: Thoddoo

Deputy Leader of Dhivehi Rayyithunge Party
- In office 2010–2011

Personal details
- Born: July 20, 1984 (age 42) Malé, Maldives
- Party: Maldivian Democratic Party (2011–2016; 2023–present)
- Other political affiliations: Dhivehi Rayyithunge Party (until 2011); Jumhooree Party (2016–2023)
- Education: Limkokwing University of Creative Technology; Curtin University (BA)

Ali Waheed (Dhivehi: ޢަލީ ވަޙީދު; born July 20, 1984), also known as Balak, is a Maldivian politician who served as the Minister of Tourism of the Maldives from 2018 to 2025. He also served as the Member of the People's Majlis for the Thoddoo constituency from 2009 to 2014. He was the Deputy Parliamentary Group Leader of the Maldivian Democratic Party. He was also the Chairman of New Radiant Sports Club.

== Early life and education ==
Born on July 20, 1984, Ali Waheed is the only son of Mohamed Waheed and Zuhura Abdulla. Although his parents are from the islands of Kulhudhuffushi and Thoddoo, Ali Waheed was born and raised in the capital city of Malé. He underwent primary and secondary education at Jamaluddin School and Majeediyya School. Upon completion of secondary education at Center for Higher Secondary Education, Ali Waheed went abroad for his undergraduate studies.

He completed his undergraduate studies at Limkokwing University of Creative Technology, Malaysia and holds a bachelor's degree of Mass Communication from Curtin University, Australia.

Ali Waheed worked at the Presidents’ Office of Maldives for a short period of time before and after completing his undergraduate studies. During this time he was offered to work at the 2008 Presidential Elections. He quit his job at the President's Office in order to pursue a career in politics, as the then Civil Service Act prohibited Civil servants from working at political campaigns and rallies.

== Career ==
=== Political work and Parliament ===
Ali Waheed first entered into the Maldivian political arena as the Spokesperson of Dhivehi Rayyithunge Party (DRP), the political party of the then incumbent President Maumoon Abdul Gayoom. He worked during the first democratic elections held in the Maldives to represent and defend DRP and President Gayoom's policies and other agendas. With the defeat of the 2008 elections, Ali Waheed ran for the first Parliamentary elections to be held after the ratification of the new Constitution, as a member of Dhivehi Rayyithunge Party.

In the May 2009 election, he ran for the Constituency of Thoddoo and succeeded against his main opponent at that time from the ruling Maldivian Democratic Party (MDP).

After his election to Parliament, Ali Waheed also represented his party, the main opposition at the leadership level, being elected the first Deputy Leader during the 2010 DRP Congress. His close affiliation with the then DRP leader, Ahmed Thasmeen Ali was highly criticized by those loyal to the former President and the public as well. With the internal political disputes in DRP, Ali Waheed quit the party and joined the ruling party MDP in May 2011 with controversial criticism and allegations from both his former party and the general public.

=== Chairman of New Radiant Sports Club ===
In addition to politics, Ali Waheed took an active involvement in sports, particularly football. He became Chairman of the New Radiant Sports Club in 2011 for a four-year term. Founded in 1979, the Club is one of the oldest clubs in the history of Maldives. New Radiant has since his Chairmanship repeated its success after a few unsuccessful years and qualified for the 2013 AFC quarter-finals. Prior to being elected Chairman of New Radiant Sports Club, Ali Waheed served as the club manager for a brief period in 2008 and was appointed as the Maldivian National Football team Manager in the year 2011.

=== Exile ===
After the trumped up charges against Mohamed Nasheed, opposition members and leaders organized a protest calling for the charges to be dropped in 2015. Riot police later clashed with the protesters and sprayed tear gas and hit them with batons. During this, many protesters were arrested including Waheed. He was later released a few weeks later and fled to the UK where he remained in exile.

In 2016, he was granted political refugee status by the British government. Maldives Immigration also revoked Waheed's passport. He was later charged with terrorism in connection to the 2015 protest. In November, Waheed resigned as the Deputy Leader of the Maldives United Opposition and as the Chairperson of the MDP. Waheed later joined the Jumhooree Party.

=== Minister of Tourism and sexual harassment allegations ===
Ali Waheed was appointed as the Minister of Tourism on November 17, 2018 by president Ibrahim Mohamed Solih.

In February 2020, audio calls were leaked where Waheed made allegedly derogatory remarks against cabinet members. There was a public outcry calling for the resignation of Waheed alongside the members of the Jumhooree Party. The Maldives Police Service launched a probe into the leaked audio.

In July 2020, several worked of the Ministry of Tourism made allegations of sexual harassment and assault against Waheed, some meeting with president Solih to lodge complaints. Waheed was asked to resign by Solih. When Waheed refused to resign, he was dismissed by Solih.

His residence was later raided by the police in connection to the sexual misconduct and was placed under a travel ban. The Prosecutor General's Office (PGO) charged Waheed with sexual abuse, attempted sexual abuse, unlawful sexual contact, indecent exposure and a single count of attempted rape.

In 2021, the Criminal Court lifted Waheed's travel ban to do a medical checkup but later fled to the United Kingdom. He was arrested by UK authorities citing breaches to the UK's immigration act, he was later released and compensated.

In 2023, the charges against Waheed were dropped by the PGO citing victim's unwillingness to proceed with the trial. He later returned to the Maldives in July. Qasim Ibrahim appointed Waheed as special advisors to him. Waheed later resigned from the Jumhooree Party and rejoined the Maldivian Democratic Party.
