= Abdulla Jabir =

Maldivian politician (born 1971)

Personal details
- Born: 6 October 1971 (age 55) Malé, Maldives
- Profession: Politician

Abdulla Jabir (born 6 October 1971) is a Maldivian politician and the former MP of the Kaashidhoo Constituency of the 19th Parliament Session of People's Majlis. He was the chairman of the now defunct Dhivehi Rayyithunge Party (DRP).

Abdulla Jabir is a prominent and controversial figure in Maldivian politics, formerly serving as the Member of Parliament (MP) for the Kaashidhoo constituency. Over the years, he has gained a reputation for his flamboyant style and erratic behavior, both inside and outside of parliament.

Jabir's political career has seen him affiliate with multiple parties. He has been a member of the Maldivian Democratic Party (MDP) several times, but his relationship with the party has been turbulent. Most recently, he rejoined the MDP in June 2023 after the dissolution of the Dhivehi Rayyithunge Party (DRP), of which he was formerly the leader. However, his time with the MDP was cut short in February 2024 when he was expelled from the party following a disciplinary investigation.

Jabir has also been involved in several controversies, including a recent incident where he verbally assaulted a seaplane pilot and crew members, leading to his ban from flying on Maldivian Airlines. His actions have often drawn widespread condemnation, and he has been ejected from parliamentary sessions multiple times for disruptive conduct.

Despite his controversial nature, Jabir has been a resilient figure in Maldivian politics, known for his eccentric speeches and proposals, such as advocating for the legalization of medical marijuana, poker, and casinos on resort islands—ideas that starkly contrast with the country's legal and religious framework.
