= Abdulla Mausoom =

Maldivian politician (born 1967)

- ޢަބްދުﷲ މަޢުޞޫމް
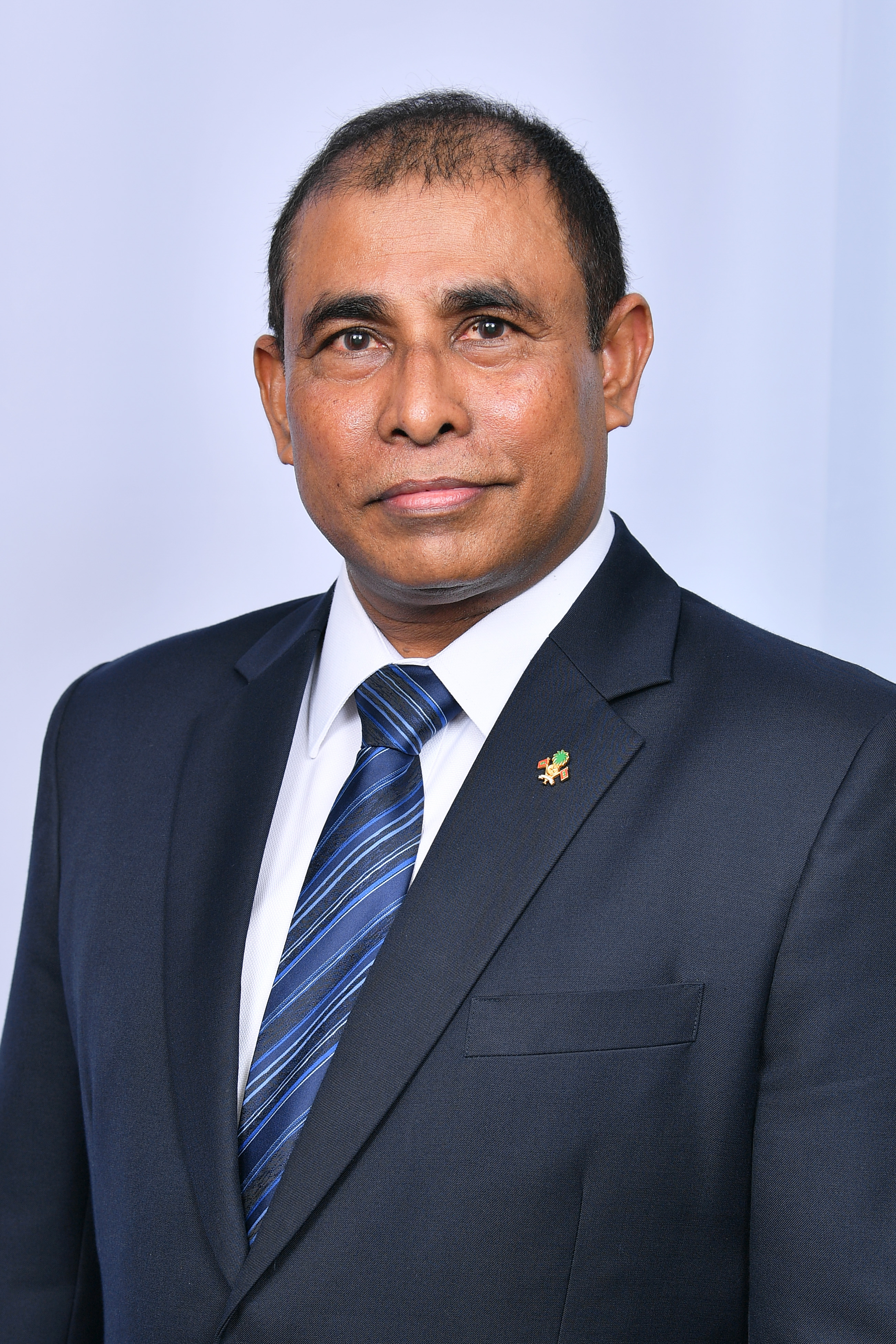
- Official portrait, 2020

Minister of Tourism
- In office 6 August 2020 – 17 November 2023
- President: Ibrahim Mohamed Solih
- Preceded by: Ali Waheed
- Succeeded by: Ibrahim Faisal

High Commissioner of the Republic of Maldives to the Republic of Singapore
- In office 18 February 2019 – 6 August 2020
- President: Ibrahim Mohamed Sollih
- Preceded by: Hamdhoon Hameed
- Succeeded by: Ibrahim Shaheeb

Member of the People's Majlis
- In office 28 May 2009 – 28 May 2014
- President: Mohamed Nasheed
- Speaker: Abdulla Shahid
- Constituency: Kelaa

Minister of Environment, Energy, and Water
- In office 29 August 2008 – 11 November 2008
- President: Maumoon Abdul Gayoom
- Preceded by: Ahmed Abdulla
- Succeeded by: Mohamed Aslam

Minister of Tourism and Civil Aviation
- In office 15 July 2008 – 29 September 2008
- President: Maumoon Abdul Gayoom
- Preceded by: Mahmood Shaugee
- Succeeded by: Abdulla Yameen

Personal details
- Born: 13 February 1967 (age 59) Kelaa, Haa Alif Atoll, Maldives
- Party: Maldivian Democratic Party (2023–present)
- Other political affiliations: Jumhooree Party (2014–2023); Dhivehi Rayyithunge Party
- Education: Ulster University; University of Birmingham

Abdulla Mausoom (Dhivehi: ޢަބްދުﷲ މަޢުޞޫމް; born 13 February 1967) is a Maldivian politician who served as Minister of Tourism of the Maldives from 2020 to 2023.

== Education ==
Mausoom earned his PhD in Urban and Regional Studies from the School of Public Policy at the University of Birmingham, UK. He also obtained a Master of Science degree in Hotel and Catering from Ulster University in the UK. His academic pursuits kept him overseas for more than a decade, during which he studied in England, Northern Ireland, Germany, and Malaysia.

== Career ==
In his career, Mausoom has served in multiple cabinet roles within the Maldives government, including as Minister of Tourism and Civil Aviation and as Minister of Environment, Energy, and Water. He was elected in 2009 to represent the Kelaa Constituency in the Parliament. His professional background also includes membership on the Tourism Promotion Advisory Council, service as a board director for the State Trading Organization, participation in the College Council of Maldives, a board directorship at the Maldives Transport & Construction Company, and membership on the board of the Maldives Association of Tourism Industry. Additionally, he held the position of general manager at Sun Island Resort and Spa.

His Foreign Affairs positions include High Commissioner of the Republic of Maldives to the Republic of Singapore, Non-Resident High Commissioner of the Republic of Maldives to the Commonwealth of Australia and Non-Resident High Commissioner of the Republic of Maldives to New Zealand.

== Awards ==
Abdulla Mausoom received the Special Award from the Government of Maldives in 2004 for his PhD.
