= Maldives Civil Aviation Authority =

Maldivian aviation regulator

- Abbreviation: CAA
- Formation: 11 January 2012; 14 years ago
- Headquarters: Velaanaage, Ameer Ahmed Magu
- Location: Malé, Maldives
- Chairman: Abdul Haris
- Chief Executive: Hussain Jaleel
- Website: https://caa.gov.mv

The Maldives Civil Aviation Authority is the civil aviation authority of the Maldives, headquartered in Malé. It is responsible to regulate, and promote the development of air transport in the Maldives.

== History ==
It was first established on 10 November 1982 as a department functioning under the President's Office with the name "Department of Civil Aviation", the functions were undertaken by the Civil Aviation section of the Ministry of Transport. The mandate of the authority had been transferred to many ministries before all functions of the authority was transferred to the Ministry of Transport and Civil Aviation. On 11 January 2012, the Maldives Civil Aviation Authority formed as an independent authority by the Parliament under Act 2/2012 and all functions of CAD were transferred to this authority.
