= Hussain Rasheed Hassan =

Maldivian politician

- ޙުސައިން ރަޝީދު ޙަސަން
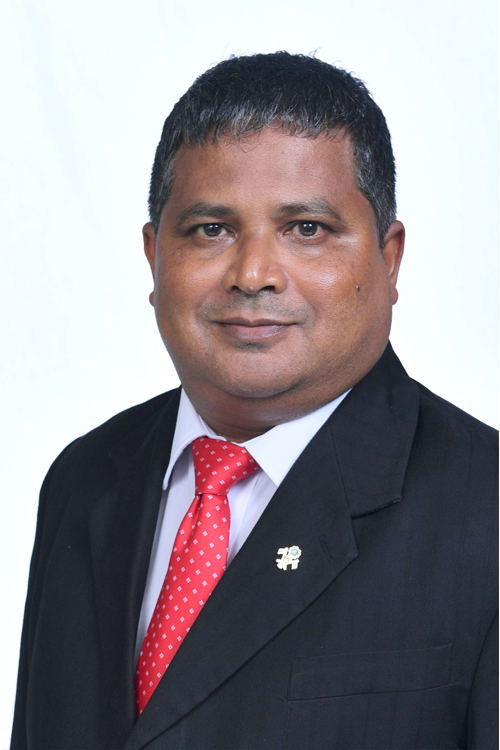
- Official portrait, 2018

Minister of Fisheries, Marine Resources and Agriculture
- In office 5 May 2021 – 17 November 2023
- President: Ibrahim Mohamed Solih
- Preceded by: Zaha Waheed
- Succeeded by: Ahmed Shiyam

Minister of Environment
- In office 17 November 2018 – 5 May 2021
- President: Ibrahim Mohamed Solih
- Preceded by: Thoriq Ibrahim
- Succeeded by: Aminath Shauna

Minister of State for Fisheries and Agriculture
- In office 2008–2013
- President: Mohamed Nasheed; Mohamed Waheed Hassan

Personal details
- Party: Jumhooree Party
- Education: Australian Maritime College; University of Portsmouth

Hussain Rasheed Hassan (Dhivehi: ޙުސައިން ރަޝީދު ޙަސަން) is a Maldivian politician who served as Minister of Fisheries, Marine Resources and Agriculture of the Maldives from 2021 to 2023.

== Education ==
Hussain Rasheed Hassan obtained his bachelor's degree in Fisheries Sciences and Management from the Australian Maritime College. He then obtained his master's degree with distinction in Fisheries Economics and his Doctor of Philosophy in International Production and Trade in Principle Market Tunas from the University of Portsmouth, UK.

== Career ==
Hussain Rasheed Hassan started his government service in 1986. He had served at the Ministry of Fisheries and Agriculture and the Ministry of Human Resources, Employment and Labour. After that, he served as a member of the People's Special Majlis formed to amend the Constitution of the Maldives. Other positions he held include Minister of State for Fisheries and Agriculture (2008 - 2013) and Minister of Environment (2018 - 2021).

From 1997 to 2001, Hussain was a researcher and lecturer at the University of Portsmouth. He also served as the president of the College Council of the College of Islamic Studies, Maldives, from 2011 to 2013.

Hussain was also a founding member of the Jumhooree Party. In addition, he was the party's deputy leader.

== Awards ==
Hussain Rasheed Hassan received the Special Award from the Government of Maldives in 2002 for his PhD.
