= Social Liberal Party (Maldives) =

Political party in the Maldives from 2008 to 2013

Social Liberal Party ސޯޝަލް ލިބަރަލް ޕާޓީ
- Abbreviation: SLP
- Leader: Mazlan Rasheed
- Founded: 4 May 2008
- Dissolved: 2013
- Split from: MDP
- Ideology: Social liberalism
- Political position: Centre to centre-left

The Social Liberal Party (Dhivehi: ސޯޝަލް ލިބަރަލް ޕާޓީ) was a centrist/centre-left social liberal political party in the Maldives. The party was a splinter from the Maldivian Democratic Party, and faced a long battle to gain registration. It was finally registered by the courts on 4 May 2008.

The party's leader was Nisaal, and the deputy leader was Aiham.

On 8 May 2011, Ibrahim Ismail, candidate for Social Liberal Party in the 2008 Maldivian presidential election joined MDP together with other key members, Hassan Latheef, Fayyaz Ismail, Ahmed Abdullah Afeef, Hassan Ismail, Hussain Ismail.

The party was dissolved in 2013.

== Election results ==
=== President elections ===
Election	Party candidate	Running mate	Votes	%	Votes	%	Result
Election	Party candidate	Running mate	First round		Second round		Result
2008	Ibrahim Ismail	Fathimath Nahid Shakir	1,382	0.78	—		Lost ✗

=== People's Majlis elections ===
Year	Party Leader	Votes	%	Position	Seats	+/-
2009	Unknown	674	0.41	7th	0 / 77	New
