= Ali Haidar Ahmed =

Maldivian politician

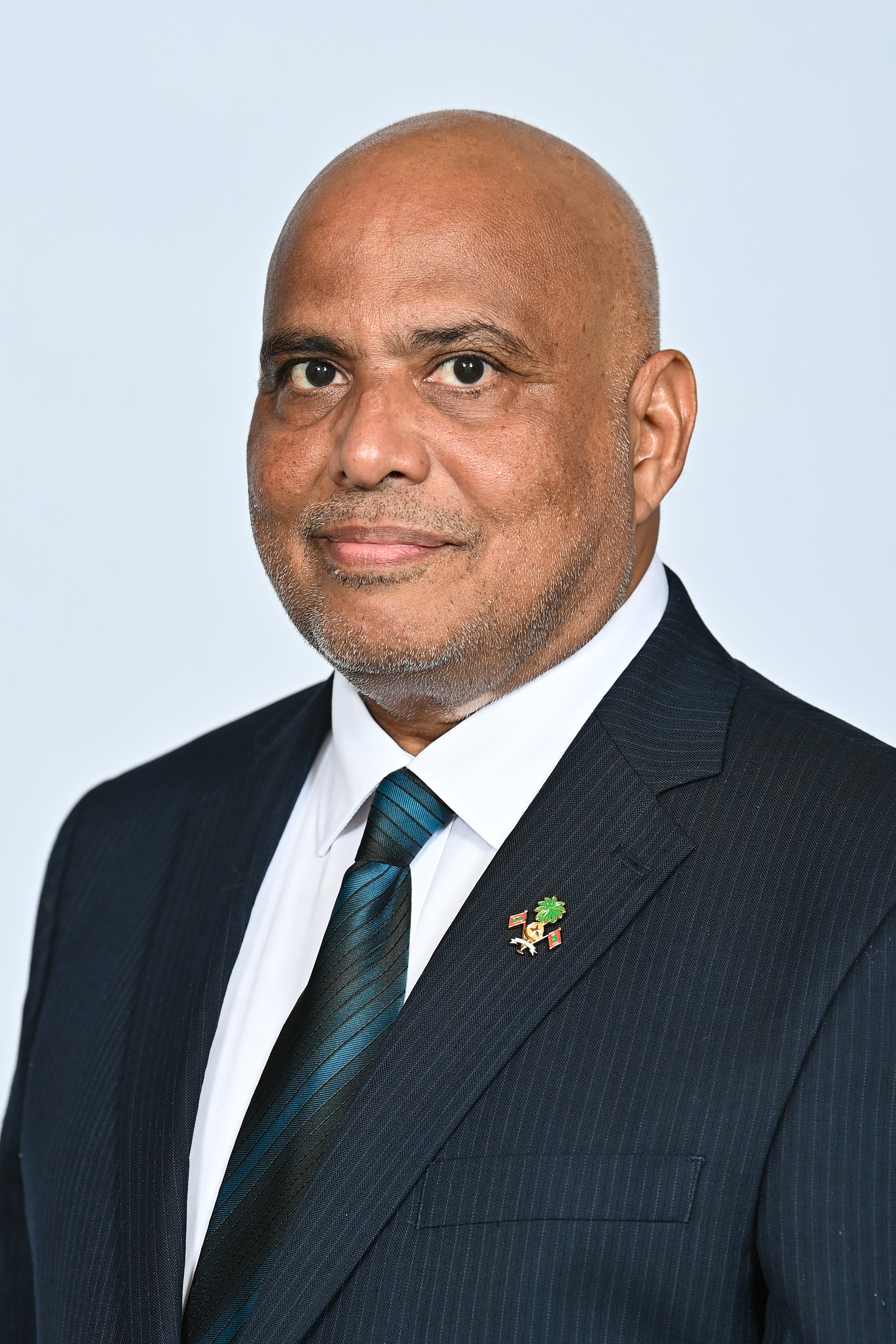

Minister of Higher Education, Labour and Skills Development
- In office 26 December 2024 – 14 April 2026
- President: Mohamed Muizzu
- Preceded by: Maryam Mariya

Minister of Housing, Land and Urban Development
- In office 17 November 2023 – 26 December 2024
- President: Mohamed Muizzu
- Preceded by: Mohamed Aslam
- Succeeded by: Abdulla Muththalib

Minister of Housing and Urban Development
- In office July 2008 – October 2008
- President: Maumoon Abdul Gayoom
- Succeeded by: Mohamed Aslam

Personal details
- Born: Machchangolhi, Malé, Maldives
- Spouse: Maryam Thaufeeg
- Education: University College London; University of Manchester

Ali Haidar Ahmed is a Maldivian politician who served as Minister of Higher Education, Labour and Skills Development from 2024 to 2026. He previously served as the Minister of Housing, Land and Urban Development.in 2023 to 2024.

== Early life and education ==
Haidar obtained his Bachelor in Town and Country Planning from the University of Manchester and his PhD in Planning Studies from the University College London. He received the Maldivian government's special award for completing his PhD.

== Career ==
Haidar served as the Housing Minister for three months, at the end of Maumoon Abdul Gayoom’s administration. He later endorsed Mohamed Muizzu during the 2021 Malé mayoral election, he was later appointed as the Minister of Housing, Land and Urban Development in 2023. In 2024, the Ministry of Housing, Land and Urban Development and the Ministry of Construction and Infrastructure merged resulting in the Ministry of Construction, Housing and Infrastructure. Ahmed's portfolio changed to Minister of Higher Education, Skill Development and Labour.
