= Mohamed Aslam (housing minister) =

Maldivian politician

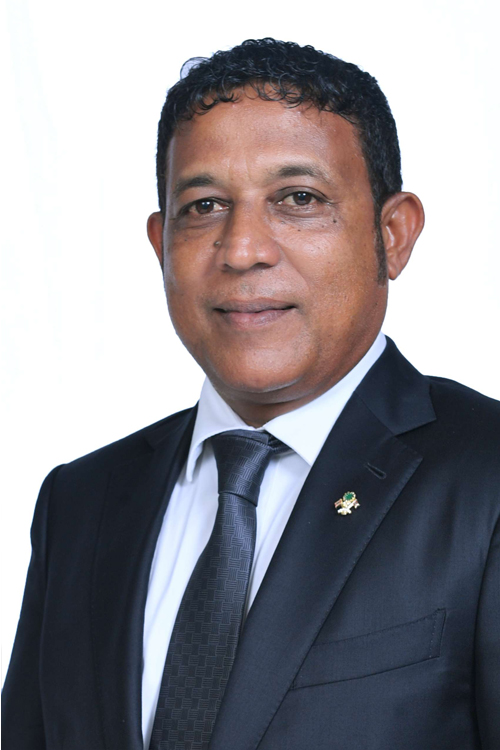
- Aslam in 2018

Minister of National Planning, Housing and Infrastructure
- In office 14 June 2020 – 17 November 2023
- President: Ibrahim Mohamed Solih
- Preceded by: Himself as Minister of National Planning and Infrastructure
- Succeeded by: Ali Haidar Ahmed

Minister of National Planning and Infrastructure
- In office 17 November 2018 – 14 June 2020
- President: Ibrahim Mohamed Solih
- Succeeded by: Himself as Minister of National Planning, Housing and Infrastructure

Minister of Housing and Environment
- In office 7 July 2010 – 7 February 2012
- President: Mohamed Nasheed
- Preceded by: Himself as Minister of Housing, Transport and Environment
- Succeeded by: Mohamed Muizzu

Minister of Housing, Transport and Environment
- In office 12 November 2008 – 29 June 2010
- President: Mohamed Nasheed
- Preceded by: (Ministry created)
- Succeeded by: Himself as Minister of Housing and Environment

Personal details
- Party: Maldivian Democratic Party

Mohamed Aslam is a Maldivian politician who served as the Minister of National Planning, Housing and Infrastructure. He has also served other governmental positions during his career.

== Career ==
Aslam was first the Minister of Housing, Transport and Environment during the presidency of Mohamed Nasheed, the ministry was later abolished and changed to the Ministry of Housing and Environment where Aslam still served as the Minister. Aslam served as the Acting Minister of Foreign Affairs from 14 December 2010 to 21 March 2011, Acting Minister of Fisheries and Agriculture from 28 March 2011 to 19 July 2011, Acting Minister of Acting Minister of Finance and Treasury from 2 January 2012 to 4 January 2012, and Acting Minister of Education from 11 December 2011 to 12 February 2012. He also served as Minister of National Planning, Housing and Infrastructure from 14 June 2020 to 17 November 2023.
