= Abdulla Rafiu =

Maldivian government official

- އަބްދުﷲ ރާފިއު
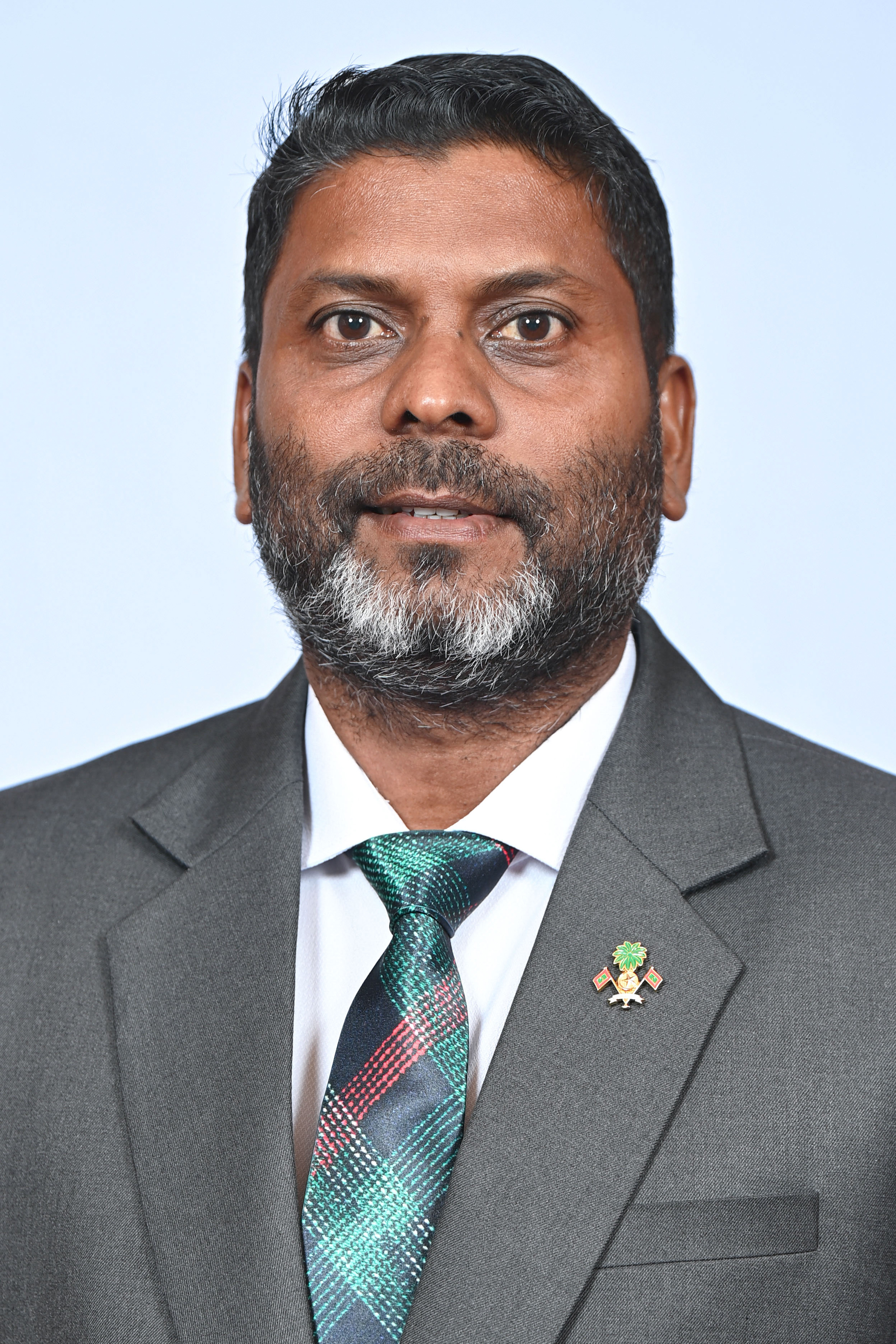
- Official portrait, 2026

Minister of Youth Empowerment, Sports and Fitness
- Incumbent
- Assumed office 14 April 2026
- President: Mohamed Muizzu
- Preceded by: Ibrahim Waheed; Himself

Minister of Sports, Fitness and Recreation
- In office 17 November 2023 – 14 April 2026
- President: Mohamed Muizzu
- Preceded by: Ahmed Mahloof
- Succeeded by: Himself

Personal details
- Born: Ukulhas, Alif Alif Atoll, Maldives
- Party: People's National Congress

Abdulla Rafiu (Dhivehi: އަބްދުﷲ ރާފިއު) is a Maldivian sports physician who is currently serving as the Minister of Youth Empowerment, Sports and Fitness since 2023.

== Education ==
He studied Sports Physiotherapy and Sports Physician courses at the Indian Institute of Physical Medicine and Rehabilitation.

== Career ==
Prior to his ministerial appointment, he was a Maldives Sports Council member. As a sports physician he led the medical team of the Maldivian contingent that took part in the 2015, 2019, and the 2023 Indian Ocean Island Games (IOIG).

He was appointed as the Minister of Sports, Fitness and Recreation by President Mohamed Muizzu on 17 November 2023. On 14 April 2026, he was appointed as the Minister of Youth Empowerment, Sports and Fitness.

On 16 September 2026, Rafiu was elected as the vice president of the People's National Congress.
