= Hassan Latheef =

Maldivian politician

- ހަސަން ލަތީފް
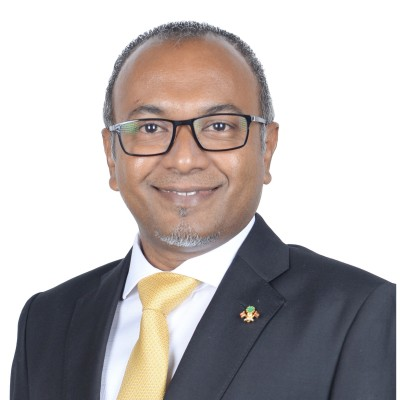
- Latheef in 2019

1st President of The Democrats
- In office 3 December 2023 – 11 January 2025
- Succeeded by: Hussain Firushan (interim); Imthiyaz Fahmy

Member of the People's Majlis
- In office April 2019 – 28 May 2024
- Preceded by: Mohamed Abdul Kareem
- Succeeded by: Ali Ibrahim
- Constituency: West Henveiru

Chairperson of the Maldivian Democratic Party
- In office December 2016 – 2022
- Preceded by: Ali Waheed
- Succeeded by: Fayyaz Ismail

Minister of Human Resources, Youth and Sports
- In office 7 July 2010 – 7 February 2012
- President: Mohamed Nasheed
- Succeeded by: Mohamed Hussain Shareef
- In office 12 November 2008 – 29 June 2010
- President: Mohamed Nasheed

Personal details
- Born: Malé, Maldives
- Party: Maldivian Democratic Party (2011–2023; 2025–present)
- Other political affiliations: The Democrats (2023–2025); Social Liberal Party (2008–2011)
- Profession: Politician

Hassan Latheef (Dhivehi: ހަސަން ލަތީފް) is a Maldivian politician who served as the President of The Democrats from 2023 to 2025 and was the former Chairperson of the Maldivian Democratic Party as well as the former People's Majlis member for the West Henveiru Constituency.

== Career ==
He started his political career as being a member of the Social Liberal Party. Later, he became the Minister of Human Resources, Youth and Sports during the Nasheed administration. He was also announced as the Civil Rights Minister in the Maldives United Opposition's shadow cabinet. He became the People's Majlis member for the West Henveiru Constituency. He left MDP in 2023 and was one of the founding members of The Democrats and was the first Party President. In 2025, he resigned as party president and rejoined the MDP.
