= Ministry of Tourism and Civil Aviation =

Ministry responsible for the tourism sector of Maldives

- ފަތުރުވެރިކަމާއި މަދަނީ އުދުހުންތަކާ ބެހޭ ވުޒާރާ Fathuruverikamaai Madhanee Udhuhunthakaa Behey Vuzaaraa

Agency overview
- Formed: 30 June 1965
- Jurisdiction: Government of the Maldives
- Headquarters: 5th Floor, H. Velaanaage, Ameeru Ahmed Magu, Male' 20096, Maldives
- Annual budget: MVR 48.5 million
- Minister responsible: Mohamed Ameen
- Deputy Ministers responsible: Ibrahim Yoosuf Fulhu; Mohamed Yamin Ahmed; Nashima Abdul Latheef
- Agency executives: Uz. Ahmed Nazim Mohamed, Minister of State for Tourism; Haris Mohamed, Minister of State for Tourism
- Website: tourism.gov.mv

Footnotes
- Tourism is the largest public sector in the Maldives

The Ministry of Tourism and Civil Aviation is part of the Maldivian Executive branch responsible to develop the Maldivian tourism industry. The tourism ministry monitors the tourism sector and regulates it. The tourism ministry was introduced in 1965 shortly after the independence of Maldives.

The Ministry awards the 1,000,000th tourist of every year to visit Maldives.

In February 2025, the ministry was merged with the Ministry of Climate Change, Environment and Energy and formed the Ministry of Tourism and Environment. The merger came with major backlash from the public as many viewed this as the government not caring about tourism. It also sparked fear about potential collapse of environmental oversight in the country.

In April 2026, the ministry was renamed to the Ministry of Tourism and Civil Aviation, with President Mohamed Muizzu appointing Mohamed Ameen as the minister.

== List of ministers ==
No.	Portrait	Name (born-died)	Term			Political party	Government	Ref.
No.	Portrait	Name (born-died)	Took office	Left office	Time in office	Political party	Government	Ref.
Ministry of Tourism
1	Ahmed Mujthaba	Ahmed Mujthaba	5 January 1989	29 May 1990	1 year, 144 days	?	Maumoon	
2	Ismail Shafeeu	Ismail Shafeeu	30 May 1990	26 May 1991	361 days	?	Maumoon	
3	Abdulla Jameel	Abdulla Jameel	27 May 1991	10 November 1993	2 years, 167 days	?	Maumoon	
4	Ibrahim Hussain Zaki	Ibrahim Hussain Zaki (born 1947)	11 November 1993	10 November 1998	4 years, 364 days	?	Maumoon	
5	Hassan Sabir	Hassan Sabir	11 November 1998	14 September 2004	5 years, 308 days	?	Maumoon	
6	Mustafa Lutfi	Mustafa Lutfi	15 September 2004	13 July 2005	301 days	?	Maumoon	
Ministry of Tourism and Civil Aviation
7	Mahmood Shaugee	Mahmood Shaugee	14 July 2005	14 July 2008	3 years, 0 days	?	Maumoon	
8	Abdulla Mausoom	Abdulla Mausoom	15 July 2008	29 September 2008	76 days	?	Maumoon	
9	Abdulla Yameen	Abdulla Yameen (born 1959)	September 2008	November 2008	1 month	?	Maumoon	
10	Ahmed Ali Sawad	Ahmed Ali Sawad	12 November 2008	29 June 2010	1 year, 228 days	MDP	Nasheed	
Ministry of Tourism, Arts and Culture
10	Ahmed Ali Sawad	Ahmed Ali Sawad	7 July 2010	12 August 2010	36 days	MDP	Nasheed	
11	Mariyam Zulfa	Mariyam Zulfa	7 November 2010	7 February 2012	2 years, 31 days	MDP	Nasheed	
12	Ahmed Adeeb	Ahmed Adeeb (born 1982)	12 February 2012	22 July 2015	3 years, 160 days	PPM	Waheed; Yameen	
Ministry of Tourism
13	Moosa Zameer	Moosa Zameer	28 October 2015	16 November 2018	3 years, 19 days	PPM	Yameen	
14	Ali Waheed	Ali Waheed (born 1984)	17 November 2018	9 July 2020	1 year, 235 days	MDP	Solih	
15	Abdulla Mausoom	Abdulla Mausoom	9 July 2020	17 November 2023	3 years, 131 days	MDP	Solih	
16	Ibrahim Faisal	Ibrahim Faisal (born 1986)	17 November 2023	28 January 2025	1 year, 72 days	PNC	Muizzu	
Ministry of Tourism and Environment
17	Thoriq Ibrahim	Thoriq Ibrahim (born 1969)	1 February 2025	14 April 2026	1 year, 72 days	PNC	Muizzu	
Ministry of Tourism and Civil Aviation
18	Mohamed Ameen	Mohamed Ameen	14 April 2026	Incumbent	81 days	PNC	Muizzu	

== See also ==
- Maldives
- Ministry of Home Affairs (Maldives)
- Economy of the Maldives
