= Mohamed Maleeh Jamal =

Maldivian politician (born 1978)

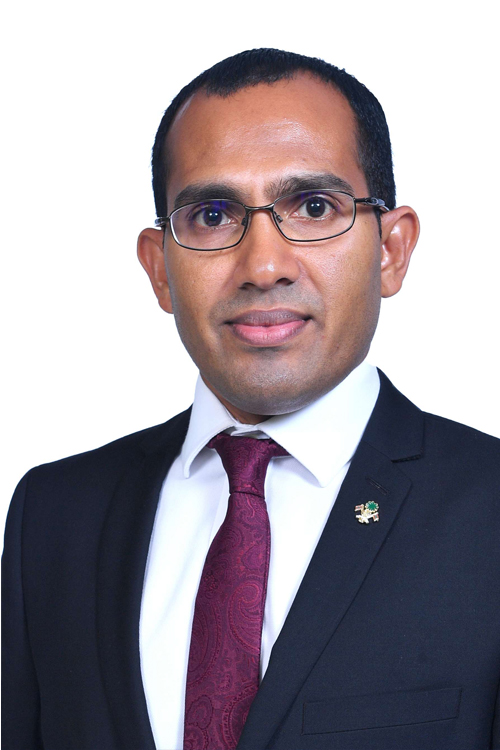
- Official portrait, 2018

Minister of Communications, Science and Technology
- In office 17 November 2018 – 1 March 2021
- Preceded by: Created
- Succeeded by: Dissolved

Minister of Youth & Sports
- In office 21 November 2013 – 20 May 2015
- Preceded by: Mohamed Hussain Shareef
- Succeeded by: Ahmed Zuhair

Personal details
- Born: 13 July 1978 Fuvahmulah, Maldives
- Party: People's National Front
- Other political affiliations: Progressive Party of Maldives; Jumhooree Party
- Education: Rochester Institute of Technology (MBA)
- Occupation: Politician

Mohamed Maleeh Jamal (Dhivehi: މުޙައްމަދު މަލީޙް ޖަމާލް; born 13 July 1978) is a Maldivian politician.

== Life ==
Born on the island of Fuvahmulah, Maleeh is a Fulbright scholar who graduated from the Rochester Institute of Technology (RIT). Throughout his political career, he has worked with various political parties, including the Progressive Party of Maldives (PPM) and the Jumhooree Party (JP). Recently, he returned to PPM.

Maleeh began his political career with the Progressive Party of Maldives (PPM) and later joined the Jumhooree Party (JP). He was appointed as the Minister of Youth from 2013 to 2015, during President Yameen's administration. He later served as the Minister of Technology and Science from 2018 to 2021, during the administration of President Ibrahim Mohamed Solih.
