= Thoriq Ibrahim =

Maldavian government official (born 1969)

- ޠާރިޤު އިބްރާހީމް
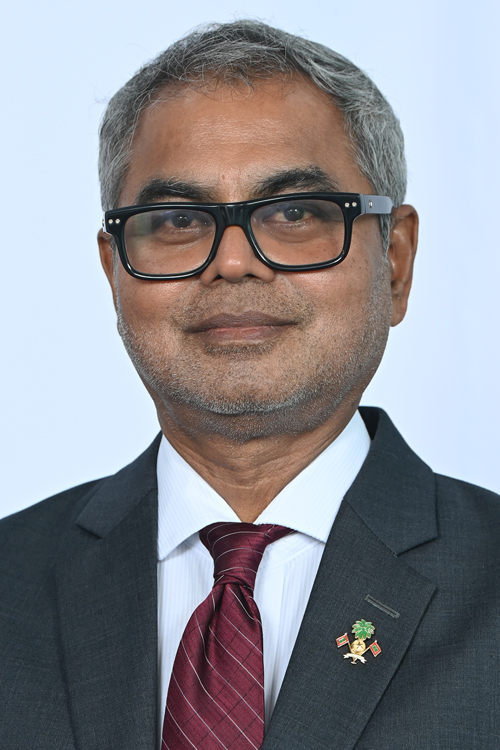
- Official portrait, 2026

Ambassador–designate of the Maldives to the United Arab Emirates
- Incumbent
- Assumed office 25 June 2026
- President: Mohamed Muizzu

Minister of Tourism and Environment
- In office 1 February 2025 – 14 April 2026
- President: Mohamed Muizzu
- Preceded by: Himself as Minister of Climate Change, Environment and Energy
- Succeeded by: Mohamed Ameen

Minister of Climate Change, Environment and Energy
- In office 17 November 2023 – 1 February 2025
- President: Mohamed Muizzu
- Preceded by: Shauna Aminath
- Succeeded by: Himself as Minister of Tourism and Environment

Minister of Environment and Energy
- In office 21 November 2013 – 17 November 2018
- President: Abdulla Yameen
- Preceded by: Mariyam Shakeela
- Succeeded by: Hussain Rasheed Hassan

Personal details
- Born: 1 February 1969 (age 57) Galolhu, Malé, Maldives
- Education: Loughborough University; National University of Singapore; Preston University

Thoriq Ibrahim (Dhivehi: ޠާރިޤު އިބްރާހީމް; born 1 February 1969) is a Maldivian politician who is currently serving as the Ambassador–designate of the Maldives to the United Arab Emirates since 2026. He previously served as the Minister of Tourism and Environment from 2023 to 2026.

== Education ==
Ibrahim acquired a Bachelor's degree in Building Services Engineering from Loughborough University of Technology. In 1995, a master's degree in Building Science from the National University of Singapore in 2002, and an MBA from Preston University in 2004.

== Career ==
He was appointed as Minister of Climate Change, Environment and Energy by President Mohamed Muizzu on 17 November 2023. Earlier, he served as the Minister of Environment and Energy from 19 November 2013 to 17 November 2018 during the presidency of Abdulla Yameen.

After finishing schooling, he took on a variety of engineering and project management work, most notably being the Project Director for the rebuilding nine houses that were damaged in the 2004 tsunami. He was also the chairman of the Alliance of Small Island States.

His ministerial portfolio was changed on 1 February 2025 after President Mohamed Muizzu merged the Ministry of Tourism and the Ministry of Climate Change, Environment and Energy together to make the Ministry of Tourism and Environment, which made Ibrahim the minister. Thoriq later resigned from the cabinet on 14 April 2026 and was appointed an Ambassador-at-Large at the Ministry of Foreign Affairs a few days later. President Muizzu later sent Ibrahim's name as the Maldivian ambassador to the United Arab Emirates to the People's Majlis, which they approved. On 25 June 2026, he appointed Ibrahim as the ambassador to the UAE.
