= Mohamed Saeed (politician) =

Maldivian government official (born 1974)

- މުޙައްމަދު ސައީދު
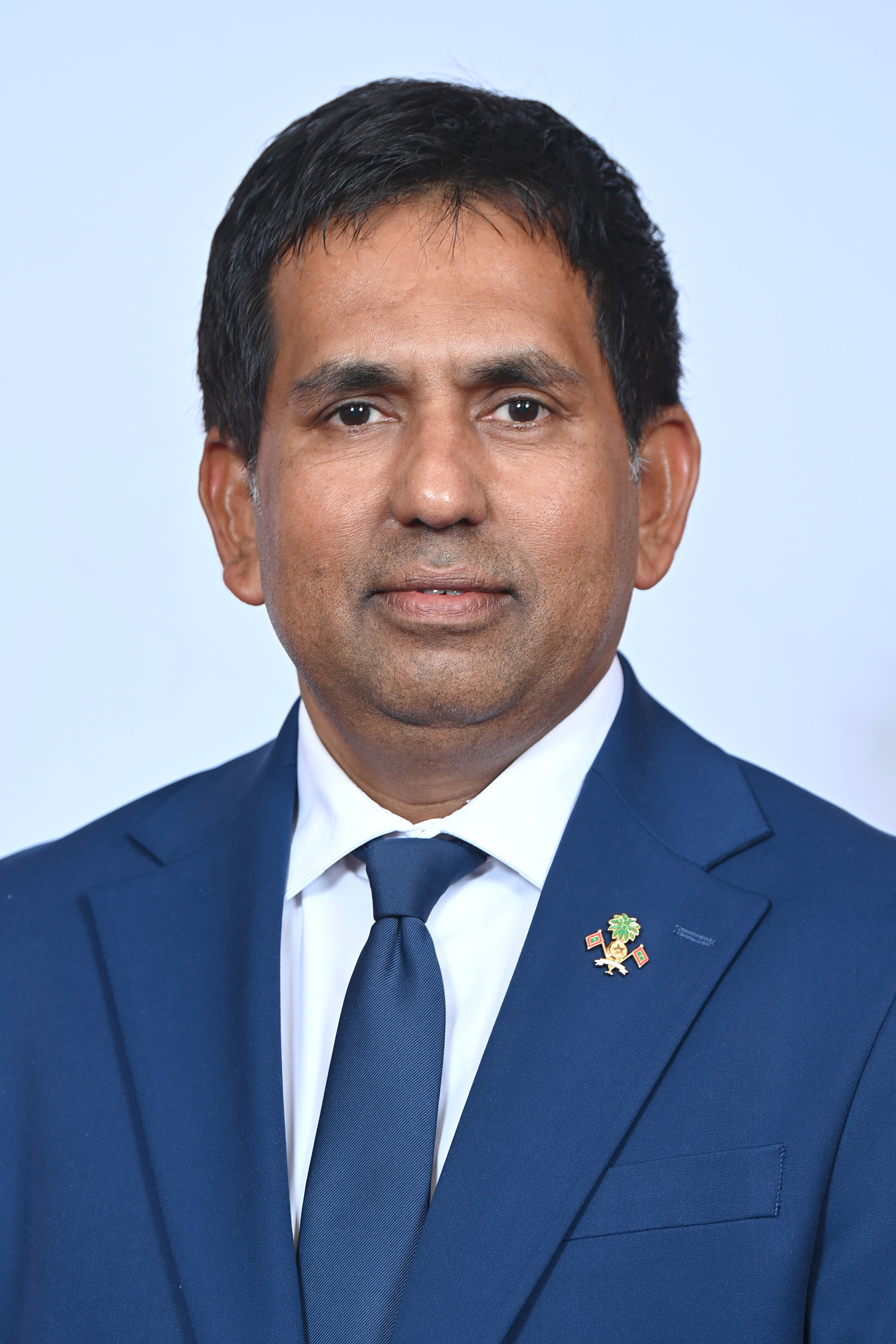
- Official portrait, 2026

Minister of Economic Development, Transport and Trade
- Incumbent
- Assumed office 14 April 2026
- President: Mohamed Muizzu
- Preceded by: Himself

Minister of Economic Development and Trade
- In office 17 November 2023 – 14 April 2026
- President: Mohamed Muizzu
- Preceded by: Fayyaz Ismail
- Succeeded by: Himself

Member of the People's Majlis
- In office 28 May 2019 – 17 November 2023
- President: Ibrahim Mohamed Solih
- Preceded by: Ahmed Azhan Fahumy
- Succeeded by: Ahmed Shakir
- Constituency: Maavashu

Minister of Economic Development
- In office 19 November 2013 – 17 November 2018
- President: Abdulla Yameen
- Preceded by: Ahmed Mohamed
- Succeeded by: Fayyaz Ismail

Personal details
- Born: 9 June 1974 Thuraakunu, Haa Alif Atoll, Maldives
- Party: People's National Congress
- Education: University of Nottingham

Mohamed Saeed (Dhivehi: މުޙައްމަދު ސައީދު; born 9 June 1974) is a Maldivian politician who is currently serving as the Minister of Economic Development, Transport and Trade since 2026.

== Early life and education ==
Mohamed Saeed was born on 9 June 1974 in Thuraakunu, Haa Alif Atoll.

Saeed obtained his Master of Tourism and Hospitality from the University of Birmingham.

== Career ==
Saeed served as the Economics Minister during the presidency of Abdulla Yameen, he was again reappointed as Economics Minister in the presidency of Mohamed Muizzu He was the MP for the Maavashu constituency in the 19th Parliament. He is also the Deputy Leader of the People's National Congress. Saeed was reappointed by President Mohamed Muizzu as the Minister of Economic Development, Transport and Trade in April 2026.

On 16 September 2026, Saeed was elected as the one of the vice presidents of the PNC.
