= Aminath Shauna =

Maldivian activist and government administrator (born 1985)

Her Excellency Aminath Shauna
- އާމިނަތް ޝައުނާ
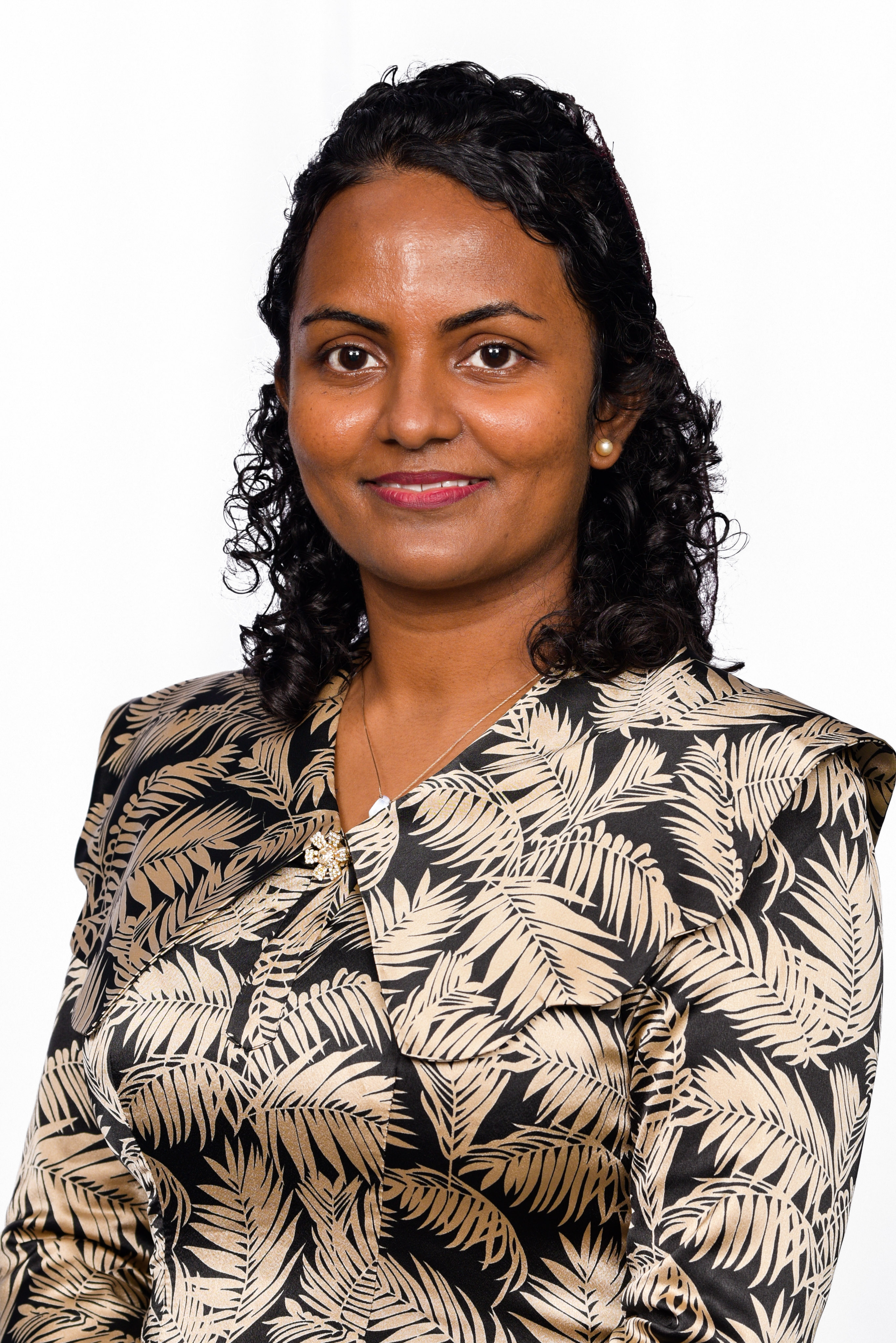
- Official portrait, 2021

Minister of Environment, Climate Change and Technology
- In office 5 May 2021 – 17 November 2023
- President: Ibrahim Mohamed Solih
- Preceded by: Office established
- Succeeded by: Thoriq Ibrahim

Personal details
- Born: Shauna Aminath; 31 January 1985 (age 41)
- Party: Maldivian Democratic Party
- Education: Westminster College
- Profession: Policy advisor

Aminath Shauna (born 31 January 1985) is a Maldivian politician who served as the Minister of Environment, Climate Change, and Technology of the Maldives.

== Early life ==
Shauna is a native of the Maldives. She began activism in the ninth grade, where she spoke out against government policies in a school debate. She attended Pearson College UWC in Victoria, British Columbia, Canada, for two years and earned her bachelor's degree from Westminster College in Fulton, Missouri in 2008. She worked for former president Mohamed Nasheed and was president of the Maldivian Democratic Party's Youth Wing.

== Government work ==
=== Deputy Under Secretary, and Under Secretary, The President's Office, 2008–2012 ===
From 2008, Shauna worked in President Nasheed's administration as Deputy Undersecretary, and later Undersecretary, for policy in the President's Office. Her portfolio included climate change, and the Maldives government worked to show the world how much climate change and the sea level rise would effect the Maldives. In 2009, President Nasheed famously held a meeting of his cabinet underwater to highlight the threats of rising seas to the low-lying Maldives.

The military forced Nasheed to resign on 7 February 2012, in an alleged coup d'état. Shauna was arrested on 17 July 2012 during a public protest against the resignation. She was released five days later upon the conditions that she not participate in protests for the next twenty one days. Shauna was arrested on several other occasions as police forces broke up peaceful demonstrations and rallies.

=== Policy Secretary, The President's Office, 2018–2021 ===
In November 2018, shortly after assuming office, President Ibrahim Mohamed Solih appointed Shauna as Policy Secretary at the President's Office. During this role, Shauna was responsible for oversight of the implementation and coordination of government policies, as well as advising the President on policy issues.

=== Minister of the Environment, Climate Change, and Technology, 2021–2023 ===
In May 2021, President Ibrahim Mohamed Solih appointed Shauna as Minister of the Environment, Climate Change, and Technology for the Maldives, a position that also included the energy brief.

During her time in office, Shauna spearheaded policies that led to a tripling of investments in renewable energy, a national phase out of single-use plastics, and a large expansion in the country’s network of protected areas, including coral reefs, sandbanks, uninhabited islands, mangroves, and surf breaks. Shauna also led the Maldives’ delegation during UN climate talks, helping to position the country as a key global advocate for climate action.

In 2021, the President of the 26th United Nations Climate Change Conference (COP26), Alok Sharma, appointed Minister Shauna to facilitate ministerial negotiations on adaptations under the COP agenda, together with Spanish Environment Minister Teresa Ribera. Shauna and Ribera were re-appointed to the role at the COP27 negotiations in Sharm-el-Sheikh, Egypt.

Also at the 2022 UN COP 27 negotiations in Sharm-el-Sheikh, Egypt, Shauna, representing the Maldives Government, played an instrumental role in the establishment of a Loss and Damage fund, to help developing countries rebuild after a climate disaster strikes, or following other losses and damages caused by climate heating.

In October 2023, Shauna published an op-ed in The New York Times arguing that small island developing states, such as the Maldives, struggle to adopt renewable energy because of the high cost of borrowing money to finance such projects. She called for greater international support to underwrite the risks associated with clean energy projects in developing countries, citing the example of a successful World Bank-supported solar project in the Maldives, in which the Bank underwrote risks associated with the investment, leading to a 1/3 drop in the price of the solar power produced.

In 2020 Shauna was recognised as a 'Young Global Leader' by the World Economic Forum.

In 2023, Bloomberg named Shauna as a ‘New Economy Catalyst’.

== Activism ==
Aminath works for the Maldivian Democratic Party as a member of the party's National Council. She was previously president of the party's youth wing. She is active in voicing her concerns for her country and climate change. Some of her early work can be seen in the documentary The Island President, which follows the story of former President Nasheed.
