= Ministry of Economic Development, Transport and Trade =

Government ministry of the Maldives

- އިގުތިސާދީ ތަރައްޤީއާއި ދަތުރުފަތުރާއި ވިޔަފާރިއާ ބެހޭ ވުޒާރާ Iqthisaadhee Tharaqqeeaai Dhathurufathuraai Viyaafaari-aa Behey Vuzaaraa

Agency overview
- Jurisdiction: Government of the Maldives
- Headquarters: Velaanaage, 11th Floor, Ameer Ahmed Magu, 20096, Male’, Maldives
- Minister responsible: Mohamed Saeed
- Deputy Ministers responsible: Solih Hussain; Aishath Shahudha Abdulla; Mohamed Aish; Ahmed Salim Saeed; Mohamed Ahmed; Ahmed Nashid Abdulla
- Agency executives: Hussain Zamir, Minister of State for Economic Development and Trade; Mohamed Thariq Ahmed, Minister of State for Economic Development and Trade; Mohamed Ahmed, Minister of State for Economic Development and Trade; Abdul Haleem Abdul Latheef, Economic Advisor on Investments and Capital Market
- Child agencies: Business Center Corporation; Consumer Ombudsman's Office; SDFC; Invest Maldives
- Website: trade.gov.mv/en

The Ministry of Economic Development, Transport and Trade (Dhivehi: އިގުތިސާދީ ތަރައްޤީއާއި ދަތުރުފަތުރާއި ވިޔަފާރިއާ ބެހޭ ވުޒާރާ) is a government ministry in the Maldives. It is the regulator of trade and provides business registration services to the country.

There are 12 committees in the Ministry. Eight of them are the Internal Committees while four are the External Committees and Councils.

Internal Committees:

- HR Management & Development Committee (HRMD)
- Bid Committee
- Bid Evaluation Committee (BEC)
- Gender Equality Committee
- Sexual Harassment Prevention Committee
- Whistleblower Protection Committee
- Right to Information
- Training Committee

External Committees & Councils:

- Business Council
- Small and Medium Enterprise Council
- Trade Facilitation Committee
- Minimum Wage Advisory Board
