= Cabinet of Mohamed Muizzu =

Government of the Maldives since 2023

Muizzu Cabinet
- Cabinet of the Maldives

- Cabinet of Mohamed Muizzu in October 2026
- Date formed: 17 November 2023

People and organisations
- President: Mohamed Muizzu
- President's history: Mayor of Malé (2021–2023); Minister of Housing and Infrastructure (2012–2018); Minister of Housing and Environment (2012–2012)
- Vice President: Hussain Mohamed Latheef
- No. of ministers: 15
- Ministers removed: 13 resigned 7 dismissed
- Member party: People's National Congress
- Status in legislature: Majority government (2024–present)
- Opposition parties: Maldivian Democratic Party; People's National Front
- Opposition leaders: Fayyaz Ismail; Mohamed Nasheed; Abdulla Shahid; Abdulla Yameen

History
- Election: 2023 presidential election
- Advice and consent: People's Majlis
- Predecessor: Solih Cabinet

The Cabinet of Mohamed Muizzu is the current most senior level of the executive branch of the current Government of the Maldives. The cabinet ministers were appointed following the inauguration of President Mohamed Muizzu.

Mohamed Muizzu assumed office as President of the Maldives on 17 November 2023. The cabinet ministers were also appointed on 17 November 2023. The cabinet include 22 Ministers.

== Overview ==
President Muizzu's administration originally comprised 21 ministers in the cabinet. The positions were distributed among politicians representing various political factions. Following the appointments of ministers, Muizzu submitted the names of ministers to the People's Majlis for approval.

Among twenty two cabinet ministers, three ministers, Ali Haidar Ahmed, Mohamed Shaheem and Ahmed Usham were unapproved after a brawl in the parliament. President Muizzu reappointed the three ministers, Shaheem as Minister of Islamic Affairs, Usham as Attorney General and Haidar as Minister of Housing, Land and Urban Development.

On 30 September 2024, when finance minister Mohamed Shafeeq resigned from his position, the cabinet was re-structured shuffling Foreign Minister Zameer as Finance minister, and Health Minister Abdulla Khaleel as Foreign minister. Health minister was replaced by Principal Secretary to the President on Public Policy Abdulla Nazim Ibrahim.

On 1 December 2024, Aishath Rameela resigned as the Minister of Agriculture and Animal Welfare citing her deteriorating health. Maryam Mariya was appointed to oversee the ministry on the same day.

On 26 December 2024, President Muizzu merged the Ministry of Construction and Infrastructure and the Ministry of Housing, Land, and Urban Development to create the Ministry of Construction, Housing and Infrastructure. The Ministry of Finance was renamed to the Ministry of Finance and Planning. The Minister of Housing, Land, and Urban Development Ali Haidar Ahmed was appointed as the Minister of Higher Education, Labour and Skills Development, Maryam Mariya officially appointed as Minister of Agriculture and Animal Welfare, and Abdulla Muththalib as Minister of Construction, Housing and Infrastructure.

On 28 January 2025, President Mohamed Muizzu dismissed Ibrahim Faisal as Minister of Tourism, no reason being given for the dismissal.

On 1 February 2025, Muizzu merged the Ministry of Tourism and the Ministry of Climate Change, Environment and Energy, thus making the Ministry of Tourism and Environment. He appointed Thoriq Ibrahim as the head of the new ministry. This merger came with public backlash and criticism.

On 14 April 2026, ten cabinet ministers — Foreign Minister Abdulla Khaleel, Defence Minister Mohamed Ghassan Maumoon, Health Minister Abdulla Nazim Ibrahim, Family Development Minister Aishath Shiham, Local Government Minister Adam Shareef, Agriculture and Animal Welfare Minister Maryam Mariya, Youth Minister Ibrahim Waheed, Tourism Minister Thoriq Ibrahim, Higher Education Minister Ali Haidar Ahmed and Dhivehi Language Minister Adam Naseer Ibrahim— resigned en masse. Muizzu merged some ministries together and appointed four new ministers — Heena Waleed as the Minister of Arts, Culture, and Heritage, Ali Shareef as the Minister of Climate Change, Environment, and Energy, Geela Ali as the Minister of Health, Family, and Welfare, and Iruthisham Adam as the Minister of Foreign Affairs — today in a ceremony. The People's Majlis approved the reshuffled cabinet on 29 April 2026.

On 8 June 2026, Moosa Zameer resigned as the Minister of Finance and Public Enterprises. President Muizzu later appointed Hassan Zareer as the Minister of Finance and Public Enterprises.

=== Composition ===
Cabinet of Ministers of Mohamed Muizzu's Government
Office	Portrait	Name	Term in office		Ref
Office	Portrait	Name	Took office	Left office	Ref
President, Commander-in-Chief of the Armed Forces		Mohamed Muizzu	November 17, 2023	Incumbent	
Vice President		Hussain Mohamed Latheef	November 17, 2023	Incumbent	
Attorney General		Ahmed Usham	November 17, 2023	Incumbent	
Minister of Foreign Affairs		Iruthisham Adam	April 14, 2026	Incumbent	
Minister of Defence and National Service		Hassan Rasheed	April 14, 2026	Incumbent	
Minister of Homeland Security, Labour and Technology		Ali Ihusaan	April 14, 2026	Incumbent	
Minister of Finance and Public Enterprises		Hassan Zareer	June 8, 2026	Incumbent	
Minister of Health, Family and Welfare		Geela Ali	April 14, 2026	Incumbent	
Minister of Education, Higher Education and Skills Development		Ismail Shafeeu	April 14, 2026	Incumbent	
Minister of Economic Development, Transport and Trade		Mohamed Saeed	April 14, 2026	Incumbent	
Minister of Fisheries, Agriculture and Ocean Resources		Ahmed Shiyam	April 14, 2026	Incumbent	
Minister of Islamic and Endowments Affairs		Mohamed Shaheem	April 14, 2026	Incumbent	
Minister of Youth Empowerment, Sports and Fitness		Abdulla Rafiu	April 14, 2026	Incumbent	
Minister of Tourism and Civil Aviation		Mohamed Ameen	April 14, 2026	Incumbent	
Minister of Infrastructure, Housing and Urban Development		Abdulla Muththalib	April 14, 2026	Incumbent	
Minister of Arts, Culture and Heritage		Heena Waleed	April 14, 2026	Incumbent	
Minister of Climate Change, Environment and Energy		Ali Shareef	April 14, 2026	Incumbent	

=== Former ministers ===
Office	Portrait	Name	Term in office		Replacement	Ref
Office	Portrait	Name	Took office	Left office	Replacement	Ref
Minister of Finance		Mohamed Shafeeq	November 17, 2023	September 30, 2024	Moosa Zameer	
Minister of Foreign Affairs		Moosa Zameer	November 17, 2023	September 30, 2024	Abdulla Khaleel	
Minister of Health		Abdulla Khaleel	November 17, 2023	September 30, 2024	Abdulla Nazim Ibrahim	
Minister of Agriculture and Animal Welfare		Aishath Rameela	November 17, 2023	December 1, 2024	Maryam Mariya (acting: December 1-26, appointed: December 26)	
Minister of Higher Education, Labour and Skills Development		Maryam Mariya	November 17, 2023	December 26, 2024	Ali Haidar Ahmed	
Minister of Housing and Urban Development		Ali Haidar Ahmed	November 17, 2023	December 26, 2024	Ministry dissolved.	
Minister of Tourism		Ibrahim Faisal	November 17, 2023	January 28, 2025	Merged with the Ministry of Climate Change, Environment and Energy to form the Ministry of Tourism and Environment.	
Minister of Foreign Affairs		Abdulla Khaleel	September 30, 2024	April 14, 2026	Iruthisham Adam	
Minister of Defence		Mohamed Ghassan Maumoon	November 17, 2023	April 14, 2026	Hassan Rasheed	
Minister of Health		Abdulla Nazim Ibrahim	September 30, 2024	April 14, 2026	Geela Ali	
Minister of Social and Family Development		Aishath Shiham	November 17, 2023	April 14, 2026	Dissolved	
Minister of Tourism and Environment		Thoriq Ibrahim	February 1, 2025	April 14, 2026	Dissolved	
Minister of Youth Empowerment, Information and Arts		Ibrahim Waheed	November 17, 2023	April 14, 2026	Abdulla Rafiu	
Ministry of Dhivehi Language, Culture and Heritage		Adam Naseer Ibrahim	November 17, 2023	April 14, 2026	Heena Waleed	
Minister of Cities, Local Government and Public Works		Adam Shareef	November 17, 2023	April 14, 2026	Dissolved	
Minister of Agriculture and Animal Welfare		Maryam Mariya	December 26, 2024	April 14, 2026	Ministry dissolved	
Minister of Higher Education, Labour and Skills Development		Ali Haidar Ahmed	December 26, 2024	April 14, 2026	Ismail Shafeeu	
Minister of Finance and Public Enterprises		Moosa Zameer	April 14, 2026	June 8, 2026	Hassan Zareer	
