= Presidency of Mohamed Muizzu =

Maldivian presidential administration since 2023

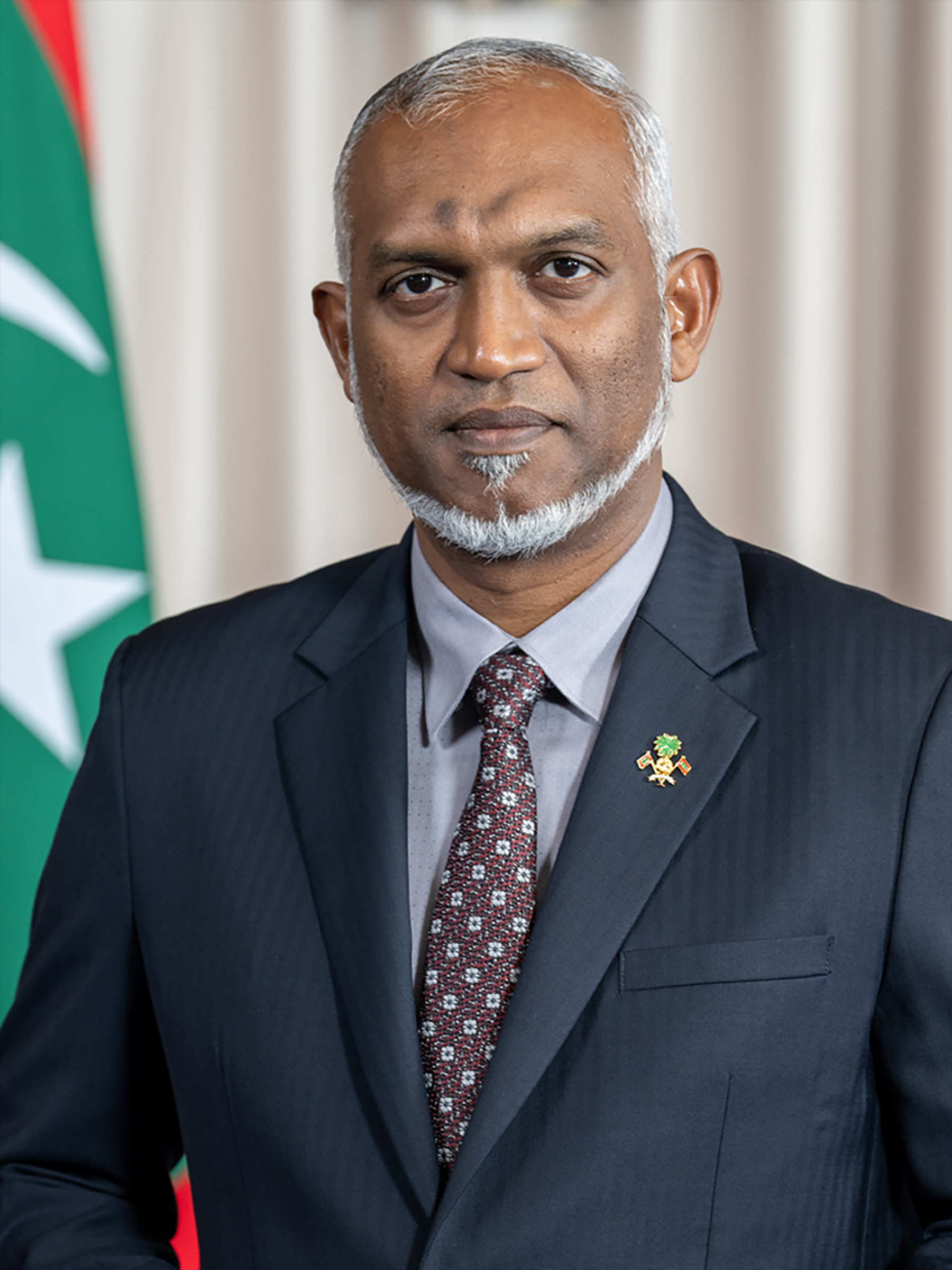
- Official portrait, 2024
- Presidency of Mohamed Muizzu; 17 November 2023 – present
- President: Mohamed Muizzu
- Vice President: Hussain Mohamed Latheef
- Cabinet: Full list
- Party: People's National Congress
- Election: 2023
- Seat: Muliaage
- Seal of the President of the Maldives

Mohamed Muizzu's tenure as the 9th President of the Maldives began with his inauguration on 17 November 2023. Muizzu, a People's National Congress politician who previously served as Housing Minister for two terms under president Mohamed Waheed Hassan and Abdulla Yameen. Muizzu was the Mayor of Malé from 2021 until his resignation in 2023.

During his presidency, Muizzu has overseen many things, such as Independence and Sovereignty, Housing and infrastructural development, Wellness and a Compassionate Society and other several things.

== 2023 elections ==
Progressive Party of Maldives announced candidacy for president as Abdulla Yameen, but due to his corruption and money laundering charges, he was sentenced in 2018 to 11 years in prison and he was ineligible to appear on the ballot. Muizzu was nominated as the presidential candidate for the People's National Congress, with parliament member, Hussain Mohamed Latheef as his running mate.

During his election campaign, Muizzu have pledged many things and projects, such as building the Addu Bridge, Rasmalé project, Economy and Environment, Independence and Sovereignty and Islam and Nationalism.

Muizzu won the 2023 Maldivian presidential election with a vote of 129,159 or 54.04%, defeating then-president Ibrahim Mohamed Solih.

== Inauguration ==
The Inauguration of Mohamed Muizzu as the 9th President of the Republic of the Maldives, was held on the Republic Square on 17 November 2023.

=== Inaugural Speech ===
During his inaugural speech after taking the oath as president, Muizzu turned to face the national flag at the Republic Square. After a brief pause, he turned back to address the attendees and continued with his speech, saying a poem on the flag.

== Administration ==
=== Cabinet ===
Mohamed Muizzu's cabinet include 21 ministers, previously 22. The new government created two new ministries, the Ministry of Agriculture and Animal Welfare and Ministry of Cities, Local Government, and Public Works the two ministries were handed to Aishath Rameela and Adam Shareef.

President Muizzu sent the names of the cabinet ministers to the parliament for parliamentary approval in November 2023. In January 2024, the parliament voted to deny approval to three cabinet ministers, Islamic Minister, Mohamed Shaheem and Minister of Housing, Land and Urban Development, Ali Haidar Ahmed, Attorney General, Ahmed Usham, After the rejection, Muizzu re-appointed the two ministers and the Attorney General again.

In September 2024, Mohamed Shafeeq resigned as Finance Minister, which Muizzu proceeded to reshuffle the cabinet. Health minister Abdulla Khaleel was appointed as foreign minister, Foreign minister Moosa Zameer as finance minister, Principal Secretary to the President on Public Policy Abdulla Nazim Ibrahim as health minister.

In December 2024, Aishath Rameela resigned as Animal Welfare minister. Muizzu appointed Maryam Mariya as the acting head of the ministry.

Muizzu merged the Ministry of Construction and Infrastructure and the Ministry of Housing, Land, and Urban Development to form the Ministry of Construction, Housing and Infrastructure. The Ministry of Finance was renamed to the Ministry of FInance and Planning.

Maryam Mariya was officially appointed as the Minister of Agriculture and Animal Welfare, Ali Haidar Ahmed was appointed as the Minister of Higher Education, Skill Development and Labour, Abdulla Muththalib as the Minister of Construction, Housing and Infrastructure.

In January 2025, Muizzu dismissed Ibrahim Faisal as the Minister of Tourism, providing no reason.

In February 2025, Muizzu merged the Ministry of Tourism with the Ministry of Climate Change, Environment and Energy to form the Ministry of Tourism and Environment. This merger sparked intense backlash from the public as they claimed that Muizzu's administration didn't care about the Maldivain tourism industry and concern about the potential collapse of environmental oversight.

== India-Maldives backlash ==
In January 2024, India and Maldives faced a diplomatic row, 3 Deputy Ministers of the Ministry of Youth, Empowerment, Information and Arts tweeted against Indian Prime Minister, Narendra Modi, which led the Maldivian government to suspend the three deputy Ministers. It led Indians to boycott the Maldives and promoting local Indian islands, Lakshadweep.

== Foreign Policy ==
=== Relations with Turkey ===
In November 2023, President Muizzu went on his first international presidential trip to Turkey, accepting the invitation by the Turkish president, Recep Tayyip Erdoğan.

The two leaders held official talks during the visit. During the official talks, President Erdoğan congratulated President Muizzu on his election victory and being sworn in as the eighth president of the Maldives. Following the official talks, the two leaders witnessed the signing of an "Agreement on Trade and Economic Cooperation Between the Government of the Maldives and the Government of Turkey".

=== United States ===
The United States has been seen as a "close friend" in the Muizzu government. Administrator Samantha Power leaded the United States Presidential Delegation to the Maldives to attend the inauguration of Muizzu. Previously, US Secretary of State Antony Blinken and Foreign Minister Moosa Zameer had official talks.

=== India ===
President Muizzu's presidential campaign focused on reducing Indian influence in Maldivian affairs, Muizzu's first 100-day plan included withdrawal of Indian troops in the Maldives. In February 2024, Muizzu said that all Indian troops should leave the Maldives before May 10th of 2024. He also said that "We may be small. But that doesn’t give you the license to bully us".

=== China ===
President Muizzu went to China, accepting the invitation by president Xi Jinping. During the presidential election, observers described Muizzu as "a pro-Chinese candidate".
