= Iruthisham Adam =

Maldivian government official

- އިރުތިޝާމް އާދަމް
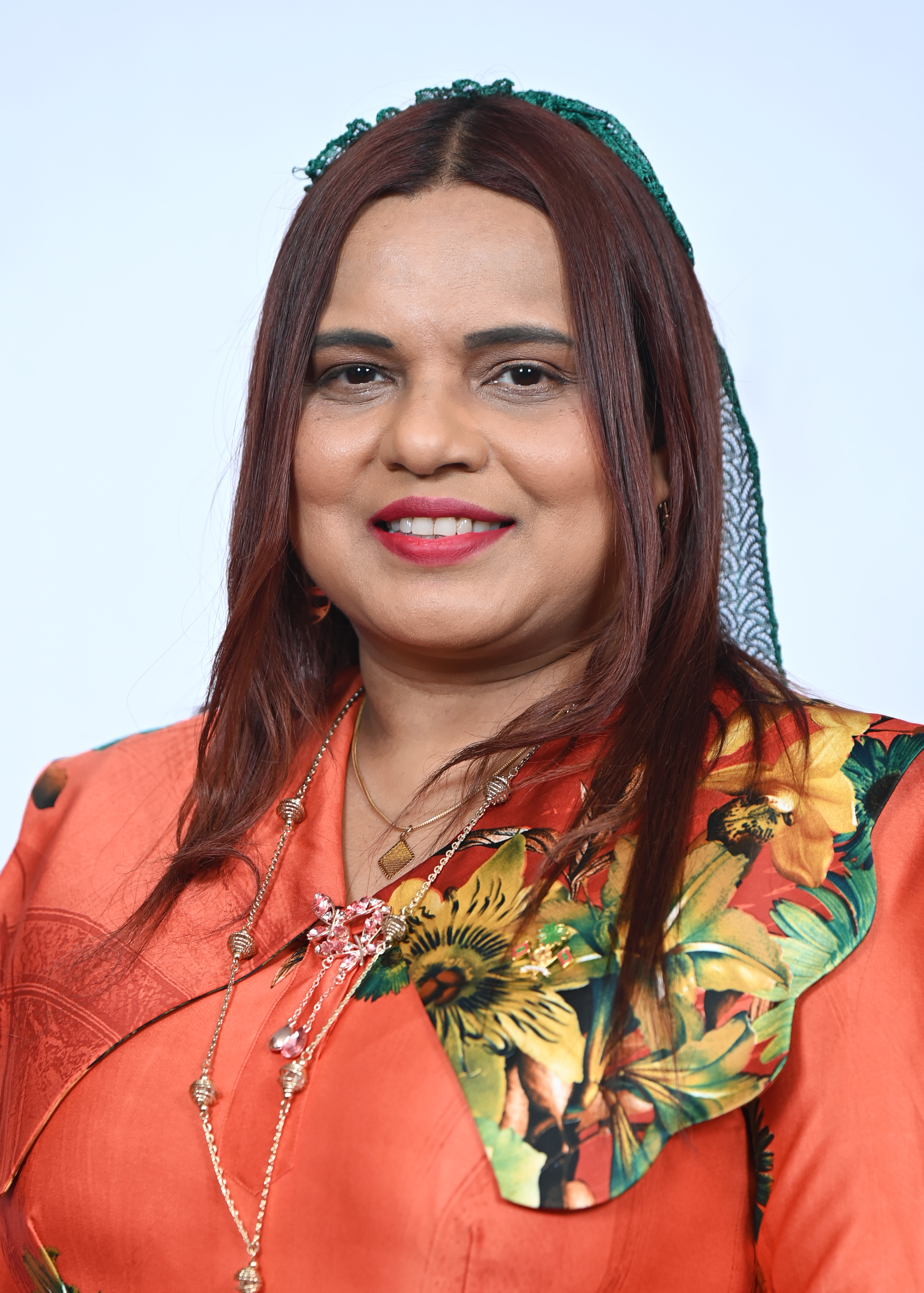
- Official portrait, 2026

Minister of Foreign Affairs
- Incumbent
- Assumed office 14 April 2026
- President: Mohamed Muizzu
- Preceded by: Abdulla Khaleel

High Commissioner of the Maldives to the United Kingdom
- In office 12 December 2024 – 14 April 2026
- President: Mohamed Muizzu
- Preceded by: Farahanaz Faizal

Minister of Health
- In office 20 May 2015 – 22 June 2016
- President: Abdulla Yameen
- Preceded by: Ahmed Zuhoor
- Succeeded by: Abdulla Nazim Ibrahim

Iruthusham Adam (Dhivehi: އިރުތިޝާމް އާދަމް) is a Maldivian politician and diplomat who is currently serving as the Minister of Foreign Affairs since 2026. Adam previously served as the High Commissioner of the Maldives to the United Kingdom from 2024 to 2026.

== Career ==
Adam was appointed as the Permanent Representative of the Maldives to the United Nations Office at Geneva in 2009 by President Mohamed Nasheed.

Adam served as the Minister of Health and was appointed by President Abdulla Yameen on 20 May 2015.

On 22 June 2016, she was later appointed by President Yameen as the Minister of Youth and Sports.

On 7 May 2024, Adam was appointed by President Mohamed Muizzu as the High Commissioner of the Maldives to the United Kingdom. She presented her letter of credence to Charles III on 12 December 2024.

On 14 April 2026, President Muizzu appointed Adam as the Minister of Foreign Affairs.
