= Ministry of Agriculture and Animal Welfare =

Maldivian government ministry

- ދަނޑުވެރިކަމާއި ދިރޭތަކެއްޗާ ބެހޭ ވުޒާރާ

Ministry overview
- Formed: 17 November 2023
- Dissolved: 14 April 2026 - merged with Ministry of Fisheries, Agriculture and Ocean Resources
- Jurisdiction: Government of the Maldives
- Headquarters: Velaanage, Malé, Maldives
- Website: agriculture.gov.mv

The Ministry of Agriculture and Animal Welfare (Dhivehi: ދަނޑުވެރިކަމާއި ދިރޭތަކެއްޗާ ބެހޭ ވުޒާރާ) was a Maldivian government ministry that's responsible for the welfare of the Maldivian animals and agriculture.

== Ministers ==
No.	Portrait	Name (born-died)	Term			Political party	Government	Ref.
No.	Portrait	Name (born-died)	Took office	Left office	Time in office	Political party	Government	Ref.
1	Aishath Rameela	Aishath Rameela (born 1972)	17 November 2023	01 December 2024	1 year, 14 days	PNC	Muizzu	
-	Maryam Mariya	Maryam Mariya; Acting	01 December 2024	26 December 2024	25 days	?	Muizzu	
2	Maryam Mariya	Maryam Mariya	26 December 2024	14 April 2026	1 year, 109 days	?	Muizzu	
