= Geela Ali =

Maldivian government official

- ގީލާ އަލީ
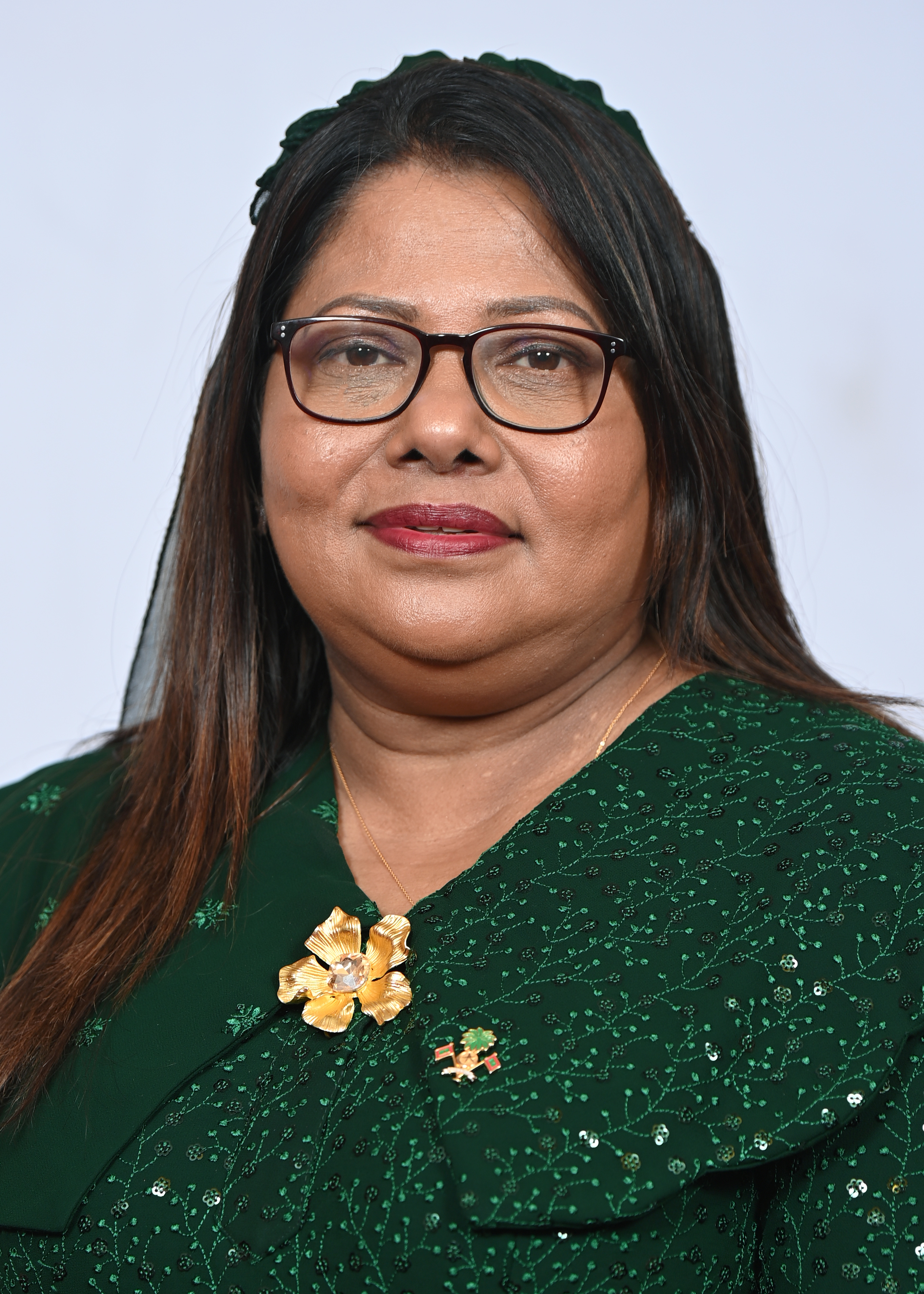
- Official portrait, 2026

Minister of Health, Family and Welfare
- Incumbent
- Assumed office 14 April 2026
- President: Mohamed Muizzu
- Preceded by: Abdulla Nazim Ibrahim

Ambassador of the Maldives to the European Union
- In office 8 July 2024 – 14 April 2026
- President: Mohamed Muizzu
- Preceded by: Omar Abdul Razzak

Ambassador of the Maldives to Belgium
- In office 19 June 2024 – 14 April 2026
- President: Mohamed Muizzu

Personal details
- Education: Chester College of Higher Education (BA); London School of Hygiene and Tropical Medicine (MSc); Avid College (BSL)

Geela Ali (Dhivehi: ގީލާ އަލީ) is a Maldivian diplomat and politician who is currently serving as the Minister of Health, Family and Welfare.

== Education ==
Ali completed her Bachelor of Arts in Health and Community Studies from Chester College of Higher Education, a Master of Science in Public Health from the London School of Hygiene and Tropical Medicine, Bachelor in Sharia and Law from Avid College. She also received a postgraduate diploma in Epidemiology and Biostatistics from Mahidol University.

== Career ==
Ali began her government service as a Health Promotion Officer at the Ministry of Health in 1995. In 2015, she served as the chargé d'affaires at the Permanent Mission of the Republic of Maldives to the United Nations Office at Geneva.

On 7 May 2024, Ali was appointed by President Mohamed Muizzu as the Ambassador of the Maldives to Belgium and the Head of Mission to the European Union. She presetend her letter of credence to King Philippe of Belgium on 19 June 2024 and to the President of the European Council Charles Michel on 8 July 2024.

On 14 April 2026, she was appointed by President Muizzu as the Minister of Health, Family and Welfare.
