= Maldives–Palestine relations =

- Maldives: Palestine

Maldives–Palestine relations refer to foreign relations between the Maldives and the State of Palestine. The Maldives supports an independent Palestine.

Walid A.M. Abu Ali is the Ambassador Palestine to the Maldives. Ambassador Mohamed Khaleel, is the non-resident ambassador of the Maldives to Palestine, stationed in Jordan.

== History ==
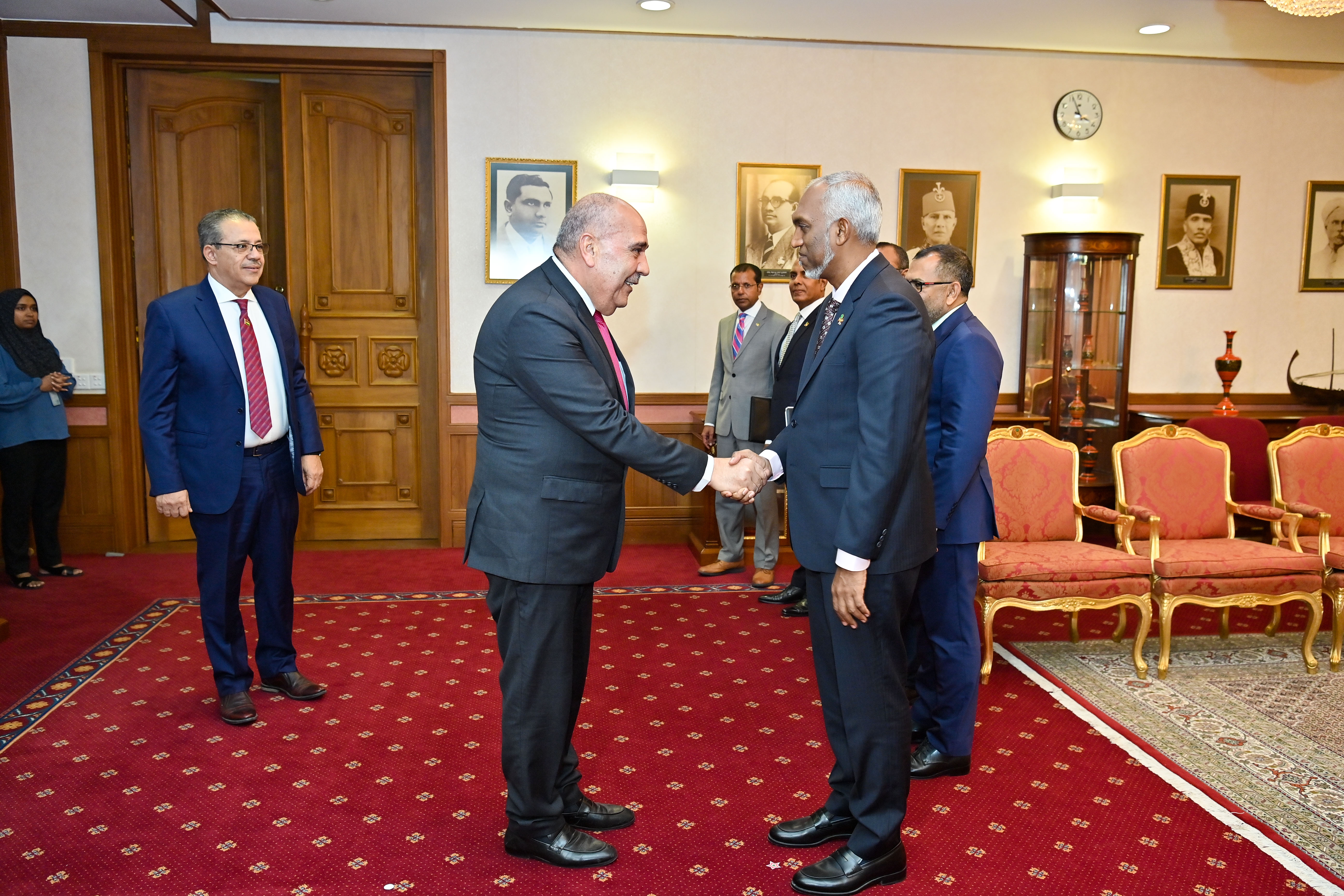
President of Maldives Mohamed Muizzu meets Ambassador of Palestine Walid Abu Ali

The Maldives and Palestine established diplomatic ties on 4 April 1982. The Palestine Liberation Organization opened an office for the Maldives and Sri Lanka in 1975 and would later be transformed to the Embassy of Palestine to Sri Lanka and the Maldives.

The Maldives has called for the establishment of an independent Palestine state based on the pre-1967 borders with East Jerusalem as the capital of Palestine.

On 17 November 2018, Riyad al-Maliki, Foreign Affairs Minister of the Palestinian National Authority, visited the Maldives and met his counterpart Abdulla Shahid.

The Maldives expressed concern over the safety of Palestinians in Gaza during the Gaza war. Mohamed Nasheed Abdulla, Maldivian Member of the People's Majlis, proposed the banning of Israeli passport holders to the Maldives. Maldivians expressed solidarity with Palestine during the war and has held mass rallies and boycotted Israeli products. The Maldives has also plans of donating two million fish cans to relieve Palestinians as part of humanitarian aid.

Maldives had joined South Africa's case against Israel and delivered a statement to the International Court of Justice on behalf of the Government of Palestine and the Palestinian people.

On 23 May 2024, as a show of solidarity with the Palestinian people, Mayor of Malé City Adam Azim announced that a road will be named after Palestine with the name Palestine Road (Dhivehi: ފަލަސްތީން ހިނގުން, romanized: Falasteen Hin’gun).

On 1 August 2024, the Government of Maldives condemned the assassination of Ismail Haniyeh, the Chief of the Political Bureau of Hamas. Critics also noticed how the government was late to condemn the attack which raised questions on President Muizzu's foreign policy.

== See also ==
- Foreign relations of the Maldives
- Foreign relations of the State of Palestine
- International recognition of the State of Palestine
