= Dharubaaruge =

Government building in Malé, Maldives

Coordinates: 4.1705°N 73.5154°E

- Alternative names: Dharubaaruge Convention Centre

General information
- Location: Henveiru, Boduthakurufaanu Magu,, Malé, Maldives
- Completed: 1990

Dharubaaruge (also known as Dharubaaruge Convention Centre; Dhivehi: ދަރުބާރުގެ) is a convention centre located in Malé.

== History ==
Dharubaaruge was initially constructed in 1990 by president Maumoon Abdul Gayoom to host the 5th SAARC Summit. It's been renovated two times, once in 2014, and the other in 2024. Dharubaaruge has three halls, Rannaban’deyri Maalan, Hakuraa Maalan, and Hiriya Maalan. Dharubaaruge had been used as a voting centre, a National Emergency Operation Centre during the COVID-19 pandemic, main headquarters during the 2023 Maldivian presidential election, and is currently being used as the main headquarters for the Ministry of Construction, Housing and Infrastructure, and the Ministry of Climate Change, Environment and Energy in 2024.
