= Addu Bridge =

Hithadhoo and Meedhoo connectivity bridge project, Maldives

- Coordinates: 0.65°S 73.16°E
- Crosses: Hulhumeedhoo, Hithadhoo
- Locale: Addu City, Maldives

Characteristics
- Total length: 15 km^{2}

History
- Contracted lead designer: The Arab Contractors

Addu City Bridge, commonly known as Addu bridge or Addu City Bridge Project, Addu Connectivity Bridge Project is a planned bridge project, which will connect capital of Addu Atoll, Hithadhoo and Meedhoo in Addu city. The estimated length of the bridge is 13 to 15 kilometres cross the Addu atoll.

== Overview ==
The planned bridge connecting Hithadhoo and Hulhumeedhoo in Addu City has been planned to build since the presidency of former president, Abdulla Yameen. The bridge will be connected from the capital of Addu city and Meedhoo.

Connecting Hithadhoo with Hulhumeedhoo stood as a solemn commitment articulated by the former President Abdulla Yameen during his 2018 presidential campaign. This pledge reverberated within the echelons of political discourse, resonating with constituents across the Maldives.

The current incumbent president, Muizzu, avowed to materialize President Yameen's visionary aspiration during his campaign sojourn to Addu City in August 2023, marking a seminal moment wherein a monumental initiative was unveiled beyond the confines of the Greater Malé region.

The forthcoming bridge in Addu Atoll shall transcend as the preeminent infrastructure undertaking in the Maldives, eclipsing even the grandeur of the extant Sinamalé Bridge. In realizing the linkage between Hithadhoo and Hulhumeedhoo, the project necessitates the conceptualization and execution of a bridge spanning a prodigious expanse, estimated between 13 and 15 kilometers, a stark contrast to the mere 1.4 kilometers span of the Sinamalé Bridge.

== Survey and design ==
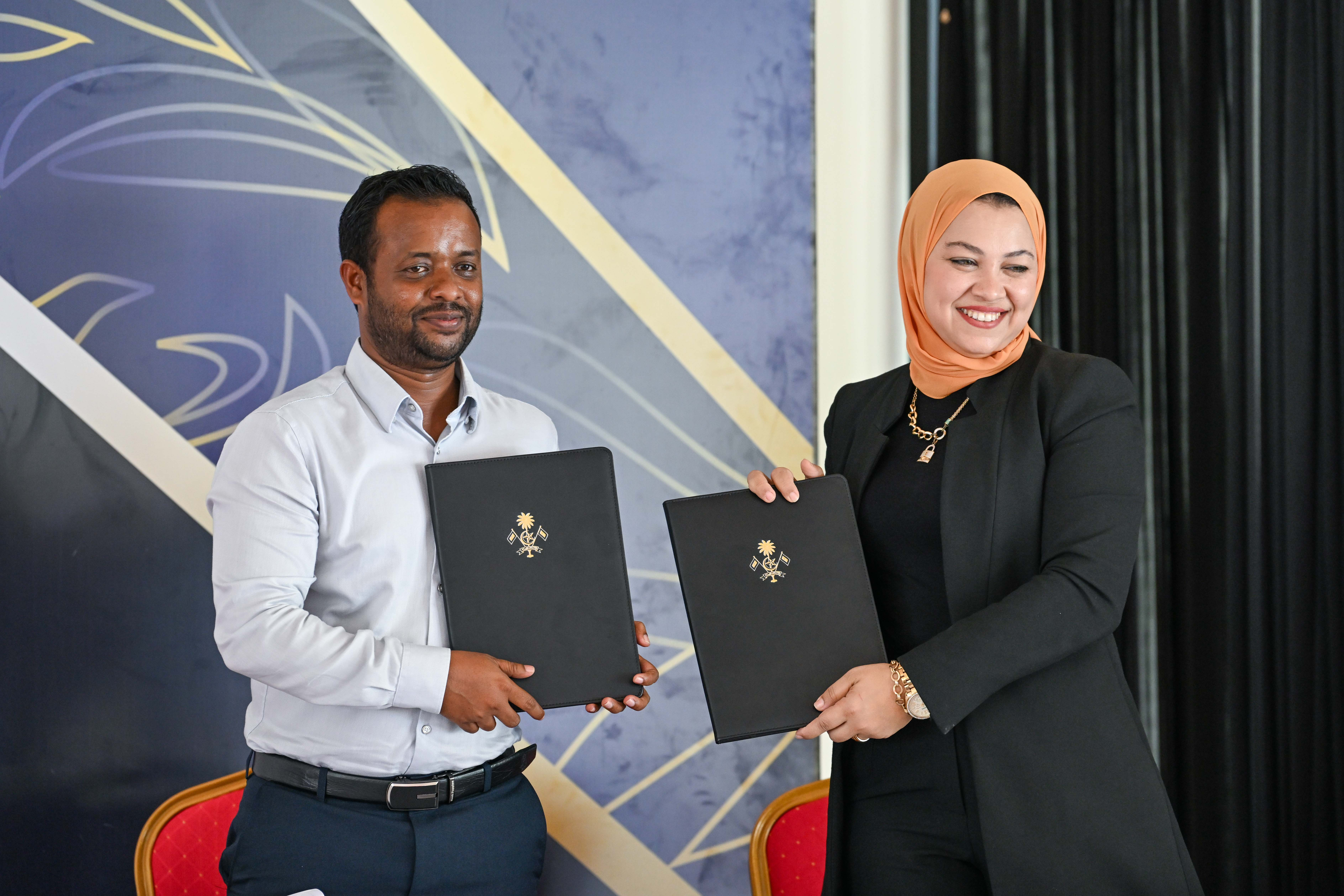
Minister of Construction and Infrastructure, Abdulla Muththalib and Heba Abu AlEla, board member of the Arab Contractors signing the Agreement of preliminary design and survey of the bridge

As pledged, the president Muizzu's government in February, the preliminary design and survey of the bridge had been assigned to The Arab Contractors.

The Minister of Construction and Infrastructure, Abdulla Muththalib, signed the agreement on behalf of the Maldivian Government. On behalf of The Arab Contractors, the agreement was signed by their engineer, Heba Abu AlEla.

In March 2024, The Ministry of Construction and Infrastructure, announced that the commenced the initial surveying works for preparation of the preliminary design of the Addu bridge has been completed by The Arab Contractors — Osman Ahmed Osman & Co.

== See also ==
- Addu atoll
- Addu City
- Hulhumeedhoo
- Hithadhoo
- Maldives
- Sinamalé Bridge
- Thilamalé Bridge

== Sources ==
This article incorporates text from a free content work. Licensed under Creative Commons Attribution 4.0 International Licence (license statement/permission). Text taken from MoU for preliminary design and survey of the Hithadhoo and Hulhumeedhoo Bridge signed, President of the Maldives.
