= Ministry of Youth Empowerment, Information and Arts =

Maldivian government ministry

Ministry of Youth Empowernment, Information and Arts
- ޒުވާނުން ބާރުވެރިކުރުވުމާއި، މައުލޫމާތާއި ފަންނާ ބެހޭ ވުޒާރާ

Agency overview
- Formed: 17 November 2023
- Dissolved: 14 April 2026 - merged with Ministry of Sports, Fitness and Recreation
- Headquarters: Velaanaage, Henveiru, Malé, Maldives Information and Arts
- Website: youth.gov.mv

The Ministry of Youth Empowernment, Information and Arts (Dhivehi: ޒުވާނުން ބާރުވެރިކުރުވުމާއި، މައުލޫމާތާއި ފަންނާ ބެހޭ ވުޒާރާ) was a Maldivian government ministry responsible for uniting and empowering youth across the Maldives.

== Ministers ==
| No. | Portrait | Name (born-died) | Term | | | Political party | Government | Ref. |
| No. | Portrait | Name (born-died) | Took office | Left office | Time in office | Political party | Government | Ref. |
|---|---|---|---|---|---|---|---|---|
| 1 | Ibrahim Waheed | Ibrahim Waheed | 17 November 2023 | 14 April 2026 | 2 years, 148 days | ? | Muizzu | |
