= Ibrahim Didi =

Maldivian politician (born 1966)

- އިބްރާހީމް ދީދީ
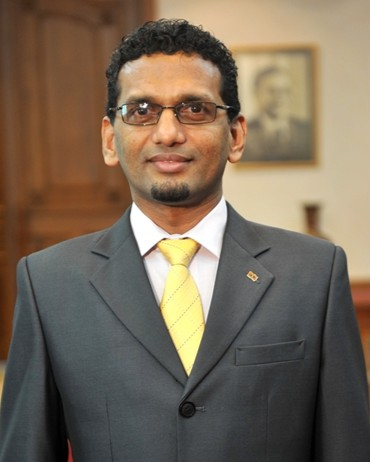
- Didi in 2011

Minister of Fisheries and Agriculture
- In office 19 July 2011 – 7 February 2012
- President: Mohamed Nasheed
- Succeeded by: Ahmed Shafeeu
- In office 12 November 2008 – 11 December 2010
- President: Mohamed Nasheed
- Succeeded by: Aminath Jameel (acting); Mohamed Aslam (acting); Himself

Personal details
- Born: 18 September 1966 (age 60) Addu City, Maldives
- Party: Maldivian Democratic Party (2008–2012; 2013–present)
- Other political affiliations: Jumhooree Party (2012–2013)

Dr. Ibrahim Didi (Dhivehi: އިބްރާހީމް ދީދީ; born 18 September 1966) is a Maldivian politician who served as the Minister of Fisheries and Agriculture from 2008 to 2012. He also served as the president of the Maldivian Democratic Party as well as the president of the Jumhooree Party.

== Political career ==
Prior to entering politics, Didi worked as a dentist.

He was Minister of Fisheries And Agriculture of the Maldives between 2008 and 2012. He became the Minister on 11 November 2008 until resigning after being rejected by the People's Majlis (parliament) on 10 December 2010. He was then re-appointed on 19 July 2011 by president Mohamed Nasheed.

In March 2011, Didi launched his campaign for the President of the Maldivian Democratic Party (MDP).

In April 2012, MDP's national council took a no confience vote against then–MDP president Didi and vice president Alhan Fahmy for making malicious statements which they denied. Both Didi and Fahmy were both critical over the legality and legitimacy of the meeting. The vote was passed which made Didi and Fahmy the former leaders of their respective posts. Didi originally filed a complaint with the Elections Commission but was dropped. He again submitted a complaint to the courts over the dispute. In June, both Didi and Fahmy switched parties to the Jumhooree Party (JP). They both were allegedly poised to keep their roles as president and vice president of the JP.

Later in 2013, Didi rejoined the MDP.

== Arrest ==
In 2015, Didi was arrested for attending opposition protests. He was accused of obstructing police duty, being released on 10 March. His arrest was described as unconstitutional by the Maldivian Democracy Network.
