= Ahmed Shiyam (minister) =

Maldivian government official

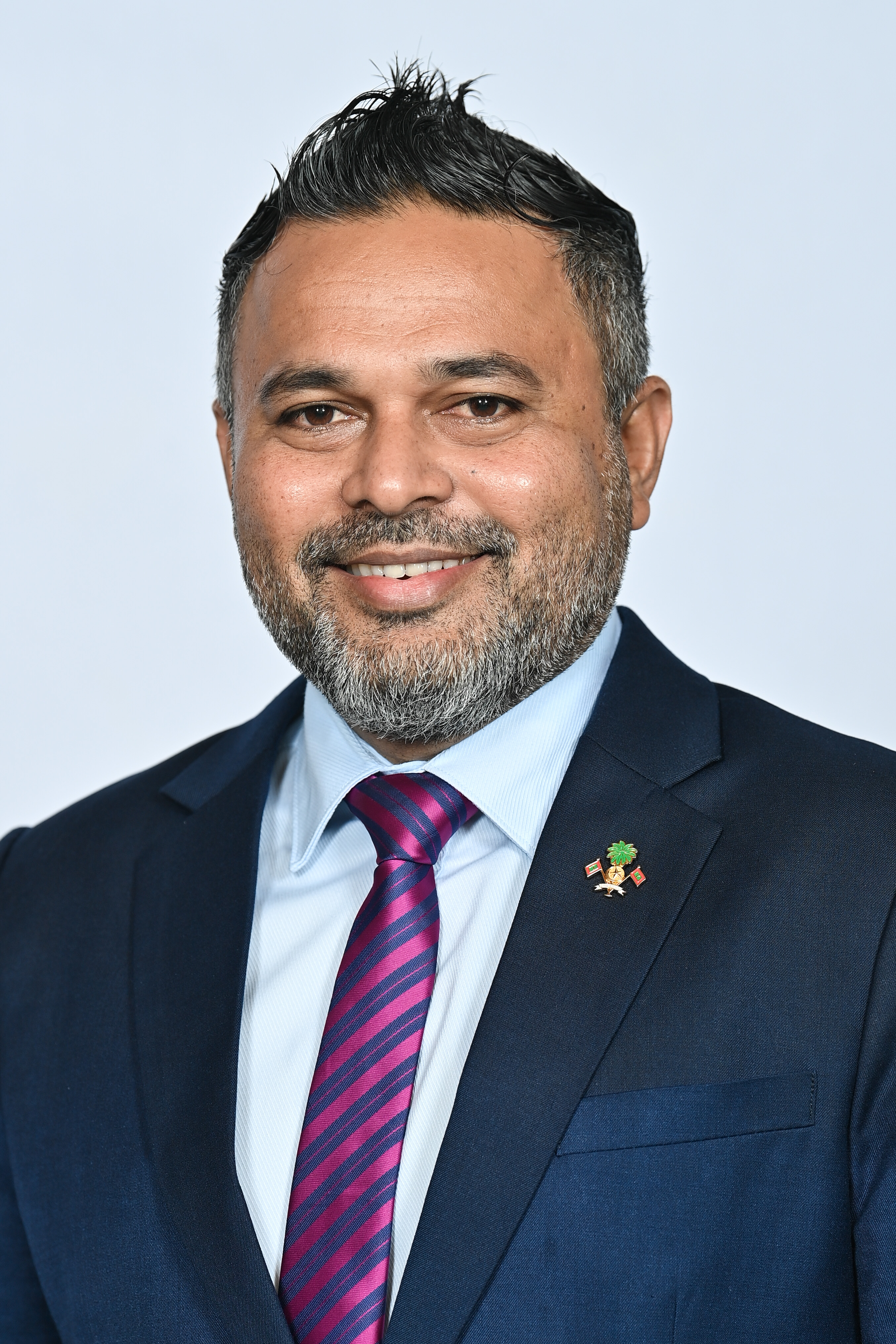
- Official portrait, 2023

Minister of Fisheries and Ocean Resources
- Incumbent
- Assumed office 17 November 2023
- President: Mohamed Muizzu
- Preceded by: Hussain Rasheed Hassan

Member of the People's Majlis
- In office 28 May 2014 – 17 November 2023
- Succeeded by: Yaaseen Abdulla
- Constituency: Naifaru

Personal details
- Born: Naifaru, Lhaviyani Atoll, Maldives
- Party: People's National Congress (2025–present)
- Other political affiliations: Progressive Party of Maldives (until 2025)

Ahmed Shiyam is a Maldivian politician who has served as the Minister of Fisheries and Ocean Resources since 2023.

== Education ==
Shiyam has a diploma in Diplomacy and World Affairs from Bandaranaike International Diplomatic Training Institute, Sri Lanka in 2012. Followed by a postgraduate diploma in Strategic Management and Leadership, in Sri Lanka. He received his Master of Business Administration from NUCB Business School in Japan.

== Career ==
Shiyam served as the 19th Member of the People's Majlis for the Naifaru constituency from 2019 until he was appointed as the Minister of Fisheries and Ocean Resources in 2023 by President Mohamed Muizzu. Shiyam served as the deputy leader of the Progressive Party of Maldives.

Following the dissolution of the PPM, Shiyam joined the People's National Congress, serving as one of the vice presidents of the party. He was reelected as the vice presidents of the PNC on 16 September 2026.
