= Yoosuf Maaniu Mohamed =

Maldivian public official

- ޔޫސުފް މާނިއު މުހައްމަދު
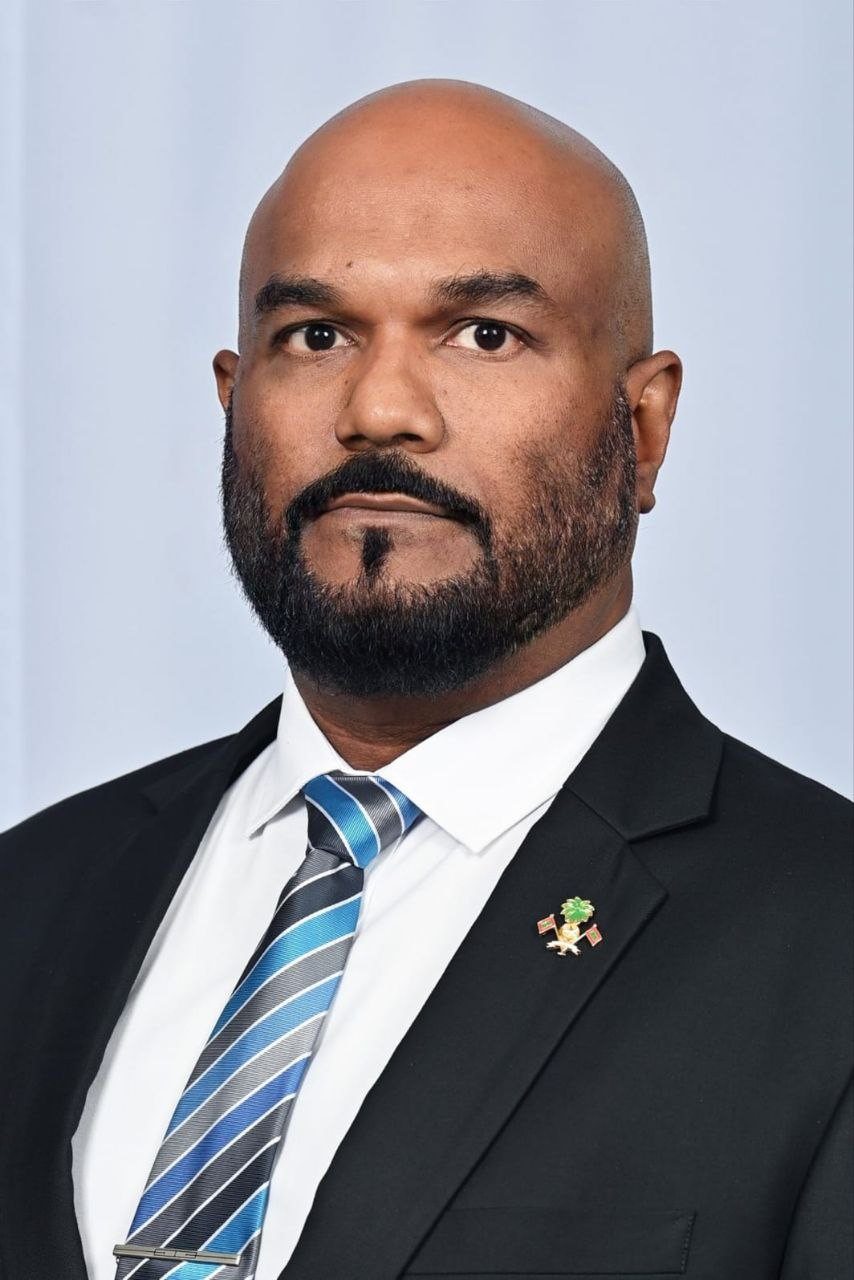
- Official portrait, 2024

CEO of Greater Malé Transport and Mobility Office
- Incumbent
- Assumed office 15 September 2026
- President: Mohamed Muizzu

Commissioner General of Customs
- In office 20 November 2023 – 22 July 2024
- President: Mohamed Muizzu
- Preceded by: Abdulla Shareef
- Succeeded by: Fathimath Dhiyana

President of the National Integrity Commission
- In office 19 December 2016 – 23 November 2017
- Preceded by: Mohamed Faruhad
- Succeeded by: Ahmed Sulaiman

Personal details
- Relations: Maryam Mariya (sister)
- Education: Northumbria University; Federation University Australia

Yoosuf Maaniu Mohamed (Dhivehi: ޔޫސުފް މާނިއު މުހައްމަދު) is a Maldivian public official who served as the chief executive officer of the Greater Malé Transport and Mobility Office of the Maldives since 2026. He previously served as the Commissioner General of Customs from 2023 to 2024 and had a brief stint as the Minister of State for Homland Security and Technology. He also served as the President of the National Integrity Commission from 2016 to 2017.

== Education and early career ==
Maaniu was born in Malé to the businessman Mohamed Yoosuf and is the brother of the politician Maryam Mariya. He holds a Master of Business Administration (MBA) in General Management from Federation University Australia in 2010 and a bachelor's degree in marketing from Northumbria University.

Mohamed previously worked at Maldives Ports Limited, JPMorgan Chase, and Horizon Fisheries. He later became CEO of the Maldives National Defence Force (MNDF)’s Sifainge Co-operative, and spent three years as the corporate head of the Auditor General's Office. He became the president of the Customs Integrity Commission following its creation in 2013.

== Career ==
=== National Integrity Commission ===
Maaniu suggested to some members of the People's Majlis to merge the Police Integrity Commission and the Customs Integrity Commission, which created the National Integrity Commission. The law was passed by the Majlis in August 2015. President Abdulla Yameen nominated Maaniu as one of the first four members of the commission, later being appointed. On 19 December 2016, the President's Office appointed Maaniu as the President of the commission.

In November 2017, Maaniu posted a tweet that police leaders who obstructed the commission's investigations "will face the full legal power of NIC". He told Mihaaru that the tweet was about non-cooperation from the police when conducting investigations. On 23 November 2017, President Yameen dismissed him as president as a member of the commission, which a presidential spokesperson confirmed.

=== Commissioner General of Customs and State Minister ===
On 20 November 2023, President Mohamed Muizzu appointed Mohamed as the Commissioner General of Customs. On 29 January 2024, International Customs Day, Customs launched an Authorized Economic Operator service for traders with clean compliance records. In March 2024 it set up a Maritime Surveillance and Border Protection Section to monitor vessels, including with surveillance drones, in cooperation with the MNDF Coast Guard.

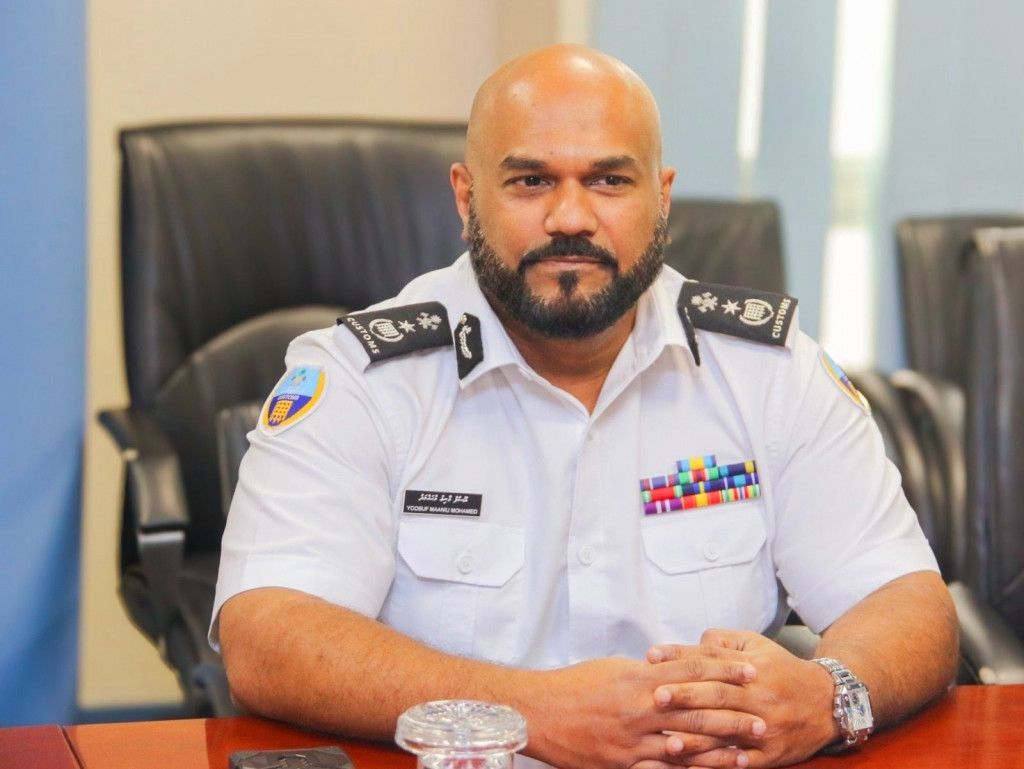
Mohamed as the Commissioner General of Customs Maldives in 2024

On 16 July 2024, Maaniu told the People's Majlis' Committee on National Security Services that Customs lacked the resources to monitor vessels entering Maldivian waters on its own, and that the United States and China would provide drones and Japan an 85-foot vessel. At another meeting with the Finance committee, he claimed that Customs had stopped 99% of drug shippments via air to the Maldives. He added that an officer who had been working the scanning machine in the first case had been suspended.

On 22 July 2024, President Muizzu appointed Fathimath Dhiyana as the Commissioner General of Customs, replacing Mohamed. Mohamed was also moved to a state minister role at the Ministry of Homeland Security and Technology. In a comment to Adhadhu, he said that he was not given a reason for the dismissal when the appointment was announced. His dismissal came following criticism of his remarks drew widespread criticism, such as wanting to destroy seized drugs within 24 hours without handing them to police. Sun also reported that his reassignment came after he claimed that "anyone who willed to smuggle weapons into Maldives could easily find the means for it". On 24 July, Mohamed resigned as the Minister of State for Homeland Security and Technology. In an interview with Adhadhu, he said that he did not want to draw a state minister's salary without having work to do.

=== Greater Malé Transport and Mobility Office ===
President Muizzu established the Greater Malé Transport and Mobility Office on 12 July 2026 as an agency under the Ministry of Economic Development, Transport and Trade, to address traffic congestion in the Greater Malé region. Following its creation, Muizzu appointed Mohamed as the head of the office on 15 September 2026. In late September he said the office would take over streets and parking zones from October, and that he would consult stakeholders including the police, the Maldives Transport and Contracting Company and the Housing Development Corporation before making decisions.
