= Ministry of Cities, Local Government and Public Works =

Government ministry of the Maldives

Ministry overview
- Formed: 17 November 2023
- Dissolved: 14 April 2026
- Jurisdiction: Government of the Maldives
- Child agencies: Maldives Post; Communications Authority of Maldives; Local Government Authority Maldives; Addu City Council; Malé City Council; Fuvahmulah City Council; Kulhudhuffushi City Council
- Website: mclp.gov.mv

The Ministry of Cities, Local Government and Public Works (Dhivehi: ސިޓީތަކާއި އިދާރީ ދާއިރާތައް ހިންގުމާއި އާންމު މަސައްކަތްތަކާ ބެހޭ ވުޒާރާ) was a Maldivian government ministry that is tasked with ensuring the councils of different cities as well as assisting them.

== Description ==
The ministry was created on 17 November 2023.

Critics say that the ministry is used as an effort to control councils, but this was denied by Minister Adam Shareef, who said that the ministry is used to facilitate a more efficient running of councils.

The ministry was abolished on 14 April 2026 following an en masse resignation of the cabinet of Mohamed Muizzu.

== Ministers ==
No.	Portrait	Name (born-died)	Term			Political party	Government	Ref.
No.	Portrait	Name (born-died)	Took office	Left office	Time in office	Political party	Government	Ref.
1	Adam Shareef	Adam Shareef (born 1964)	17 November 2023	14 April 2026	2 years, 148 days	PNC	Muizzu	
