= Zaha Waheed =

Maldivian politician

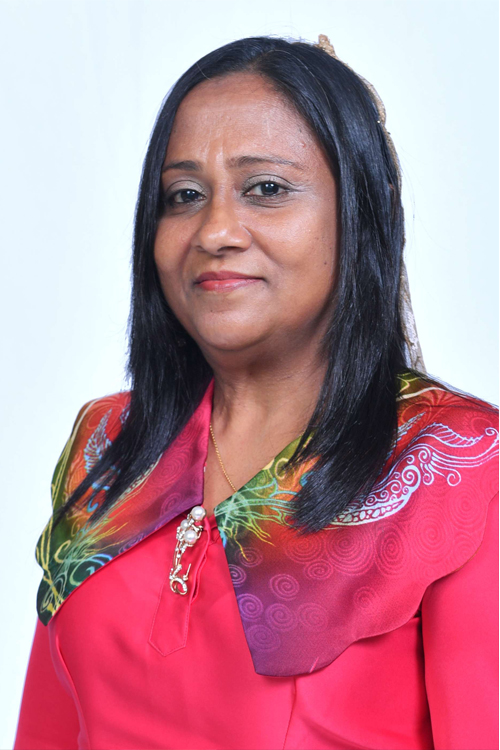
- Official portrait, 2018

Minister of Fisheries, Marine Resources and Agriculture
- In office 17 November 2018 – 5 May 2021
- President: Ibrahim Mohamed Solih
- Preceded by: Mohamed Shainee
- Succeeded by: Hussain Rasheed Hassan

Personal details
- Children: 1
- Parents: Mohamed Waheed (father); Ramlaa Abdul Ghani (mother)
- Education: Bangor University (BSc)

Zaha Waheed is a Maldivian politician who has served as a government minister.

== Biography ==
She served as Minister of Fisheries, Marine Resources and Agriculture from 2018 to 2021. In 2021, she was appointed as a Minister at the President's Office.

Zaha Waheed was given an honorary degree from Bangor University in Wales.
