= Ministry of Arts, Culture and Heritage =

Government ministry of the Maldives

- ފަންނާއި ސަގާފަތާއި ތަރިކައާ ބެހޭ ވުޒާރާ Fannaai Saqaafathaai Tharika-aa Behey Vuzaaraa

Ministry overview
- Formed: 17 November 2023
- Jurisdiction: Government of the Maldives
- Headquarters: National Museum, Machchangolhi, Malé
- Annual budget: 316k MVR (2025)
- Minister responsible: Heena Waleed
- Deputy Ministers responsible: Ahmed Anwar, Deputy Minister of Dhivehi Language, Culture and Heritage; Ibrahim Sobah, Deputy Minister of Dhivehi Language, Culture and Heritage; Adam Naseer, Deputy Minister of Dhivehi Language, Culture and Heritage; Aishath Shimla, Deputy Minister of Dhivehi Language, Culture and Heritage; Aminath Ibrahim, Deputy Minister of Dhivehi Language, Culture and Heritage; Abdulla Ali, Deputy Minister of Dhivehi Language, Culture and Heritage; Ahmed Rasheed Ibrahim, Deputy Minister of Dhivehi Language, Culture and Heritage
- Ministry executives: Ahmed Salim, Minister of State for Dhivehi Language, Culture and Heritage; Mohamed Shahuruzziyad, Minister of State for Dhivehi Language, Culture and Heritage
- Child agencies: Dhivehi Language Academy; National Center for the Protection of Heritage
- Website: mach.gov.mv

The Ministry of Arts, Culture and Heritage (Dhivehi: ފަންނާއި ސަގާފަތާއި ތަރިކައާ ބެހޭ ވުޒާރާ), is a Maldivian government ministry responsible for preserving the culture, and heritage of the Maldives.

== Description ==
The ministry was originally formed on 21 January 2014 under the name of Ministry of Culture and Heritage, it was renamed and created by the Maldivian government in 2023 to the Ministry of Dhivehi Language, Culture and Heritage. The name and responsibilities was named after president Mohamed Muizzu's government directed it. The institutions under this agency are the Dhivehi Language Academy, and such more. In 2026, the ministry was renamed to the Ministry of Arts, Culture and Heritage due to a cabinet shift.

== Ministers ==
No.	Portrait	Minister	Took office	Left office	Time in office	Party	Cabinet	Ref.
1	Yumna Maumoon	Yumna Maumoon (born 1970)	17 November 2018	17 November 2023	5 years, 0 days	MRM	Solih	
2	Adam Naseer Ibrahim	Adam Naseer Ibrahim	17 November 2023	14 April 2026	2 years, 148 days	PNC	Muizzu	
3	Heena Waleed	Heena Waleed	14 April 2026	Incumbent	27 days	PNC	Muizzu	
