= Abdulla Khaleel =

Maldivian politician

- ޢަބްދުﷲ ޚަލީލް
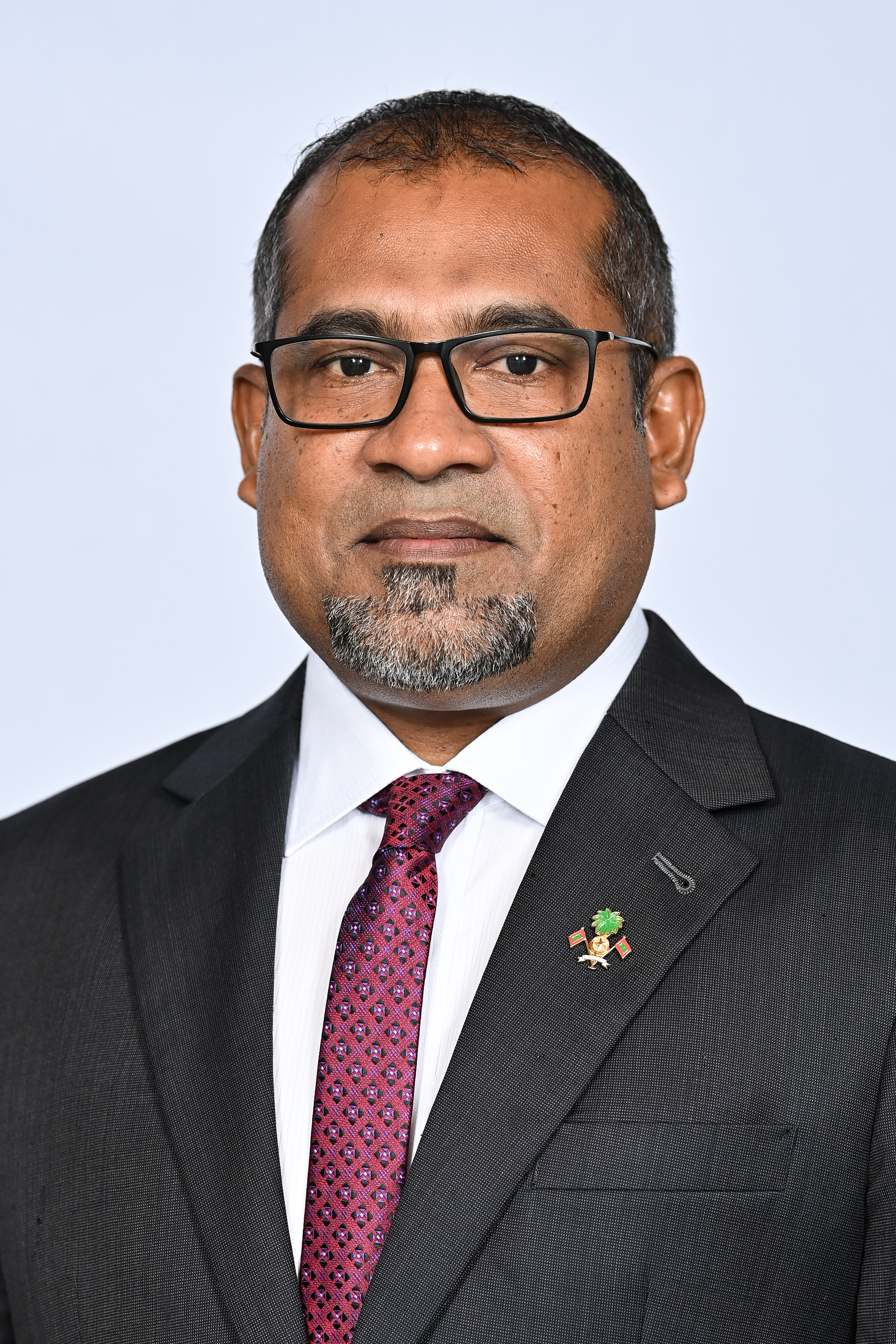
- Official portrait, 2023

Minister of Foreign Affairs
- In office 30 September 2024 – 14 April 2026
- President: Mohamed Muizzu
- Preceded by: Moosa Zameer
- Succeeded by: Iruthisham Adam

Minister of Health
- In office 17 November 2023 – 30 September 2024
- President: Mohamed Muizzu
- Preceded by: Ahmed Naseem
- Succeeded by: Abdulla Nazim Ibrahim

Member of the People's Majlis
- In office 2014–2019
- Succeeded by: Abdul Muhsin Hameed
- Constituency: Nilandhoo

Personal details
- Born: 12 February 1975 (age 51) Nilandhoo, Faafu Atoll, Maldives
- Citizenship: Maldives
- Party: People's National Congress

Abdulla Khaleel (Dhivehi: ޢަބްދުﷲ ޚަލީލް) is a Maldivian politician who served as the Minister of Foreign Affairs of the Maldives from 2024 to 2026. He previously served as the Minister of Health from 2023 to 2024. He holds a PhD in Public Policy and wrote his thesis on Decentralizing Maldives in 2015.

== Career ==
Khaleel was an assistant teacher at Faafu Atoll Education Centre in Nilandhoo (Faafu Atoll). He was responsible for teaching Financial Accounting and Economics for London GCE O level classes. From November 2004 to April 2005, he was a part-time lecturer at the International Islamic College, Malaysia. After that he was a part-time lecturer at Maldivian Academy for Professional Studies (MAPS) from January 2005 to May 2006. He was then a part-time lecturer at Villa College, Maldives from July to December 2010.

Khaleel started serving the government in 1997, and has held senior positions in the Ministry of Finance. He previously served as an MP for Nilandhoo Constituency from 2014 to 2019, as well as secretary general of the Civil Service Commission, and secretary general of the Progressive Party of Maldives (PPM). While he served for the People's Majlis, he was the chairman of the Parliamentary Economic Affairs Committee. He had also served as the atoll chief of Alif Alif Atoll from May 2006 to May 2007 as well as the atoll chief of Noonu Atoll from June 2007 to June 2008. Khaleel had also worked as an assistant supervisor at Maldives Ports Authority.

On 30 September 2024, Mohamed Muizzu reshuffled the cabinet, making Khaleel the new Foreign Affairs Minister. On 17 October 2024, Khaleel was elected as one of three vice presidents of PPM.

On 14 April 2026, Khaleel resigned as the Foreign Affairs minister as part of a mass resignation in the Muizzu cabinet.
