= Avid College =

- Motto: Gateway to Lifelong Learning
- Type: Private
- Established: 2005; 20 years ago
- Address: Ameenee Goalhi, Malé, Kaafu Atoll, Maldives; 4.171028°N 73.512956°E
- Website: https://avidcollege.edu.mv

Avid College is a private educational institution located in Malé, Maldives. It was established in 2005 and offers diverse MQA (Maldives Qualifications Authority) approved programs from certificates to postgraduate levels.

== Faculties ==
- Faculty of Education
- Faculty of Humanities & Social Sciences
- Faculty of Business Management
- Faculty of Islamic Studies & Law
- Faculty of Arts and Literature
- Center for Foundation Studies
- Avid School of Aviation
- Center for Research and Innovation
