= Aishath Rameela =

Maldivian politician (born 1972)

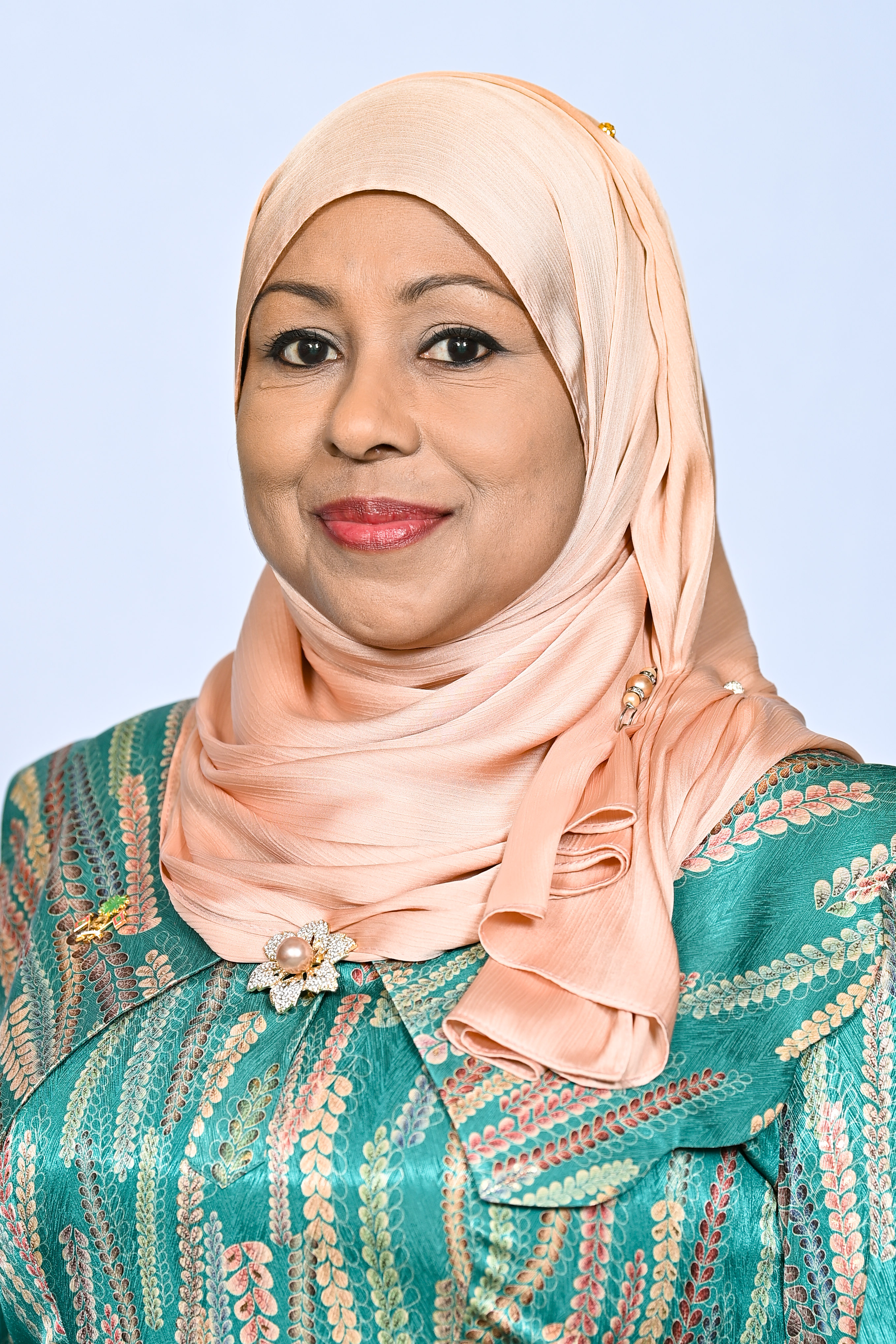

Minister of Agriculture and Animal Welfare
- In office 17 November 2023 – 1 December 2024
- President: Mohamed Muizzu
- Preceded by: (Ministry created)
- Succeeded by: Maryam Mariya

Minister of State for Health
- In office 12 March 2012 – 17 November 2018
- President: Mohamed Waheed Hassan Manik; Abdulla Yameen Abdul Gayoom
- Preceded by: Ibrahim Waheed
- Succeeded by: Khadeeja Abdul Samad Abdulla

Personal details
- Born: 12 September 1972 (age 53) Galolhu, Malé, Maldives
- Party: People's National Congress
- Occupation: Politician
- Cabinet: Cabinet of Mohamed Muizzu

Aishath Rameela (born 12 September 1972) is a Maldivian politician who is currently serving as a member of the Human Rights Commission of the Maldives since 2025. She previously served as the Minister of Agriculture and Animal Welfare from 2023 until her resignation in 2024.

== Career ==
Rameela started her career in 1990, as a nurse.

She served as the Minister of State for Health during the Waheed and Yameen administration. Rameela has a PhD and was the Registrar at the Maldives Medical and Dental Council.

She was appointed as the Minister of Agriculture and Animal Welfare on 17 November 2023 by President Mohamed Muizzu. She later resigned in December 2024 due to a cancer diagnosis.

In October 2025, President Muizzu nominated Rameela to the Human Rights Commission of the Maldives (HRCM) for parliamentary approval. She was later approved by the People's Majlis. In November, she was appointed by Muizzu.

In January 2026, President Muizzu forwarded Rameela's name to the Human Rights and Gender Committee as the President of the Human Rights Commission of the Maldives. The Majlis later approved her as the president of the commission.
