= Ministry of Infrastructure, Housing and Urban Development (Maldives) =

Government ministry of the Maldives

- ބިނާރާއި ގެދޮރުވެރިކަމާއި އުމްރާނީ ތަރައްޤީއާ ބެހޭ ވުޒާރާ Binaaraai Gedhoruverikamaai Umraanee Tharaqqee-aa Behey Vuzaaraa

Ministry overview
- Formed: 17 November 2023
- Jurisdiction: Government of the Maldives
- Headquarters: Dharubaaruge, Malé, Maldives
- Minister responsible: Abdulla Muththalib
- Deputy Ministers responsible: Mohamed Imran Hassan, Deputy Minister of Infrastructure, Housing and Urban Development; Fathmath Ifasha, Deputy Minister of Infrastructure, Housing and Urban Development; Ali Saleem, Deputy Minister of Infrastructure, Housing and Urban Development; Ismail Suood, Deputy Minister of Infrastructure, Housing and Urban Development; Mohamed Nasheed, Deputy Minister of Infrastructure, Housing and Urban Development; Ali Janah, Deputy Minister of Infrastructure, Housing and Urban Development
- Ministry executives: Ibrahim Thoaam Mohamed, Minister of State for Infrastructure, Housing and Urban Development; Ibrahim Nazeem, Minister of State for Infrastructure, Housing and Urban Development; Ismail Hameed, Minister of State for Infrastructure, Housing and Urban Development; Hassan Rasheed, Minister of State for Infrastructure, Housing and Urban Development
- Website: infrastructure.gov.mv

The Ministry of Infrastructure, Housing and Urban Development (Dhivehi: އިމާރާތްކުރުމާއި، ގެދޮރުވެރިކަމާއި އުމުރާނީ ތަރައްގީއާ ބެހޭ ވުޒާރާ), also called the Ministry of Construction and Infrastructure, is a Maldivian government ministry that is responsible for carrying out social housing projects and formulating housing policies, including those related to social housing of the Maldives.

The ministry was established on 17 November 2023 as the Ministry of Construction and Infrastructure. On 26 December 2024, President Mohamed Muizzu renamed the ministry to the Ministry of Construction, Housing and Infrastructure.

It is headquartered in Dharubaaruge following the Maldives government buildings fire.

== Ministers ==
No.	Portrait	Name (born-died)	Term			Political party	Government	Ref.
No.	Portrait	Name (born-died)	Took office	Left office	Time in office	Political party	Government	Ref.
1	Abdulla Muththalib	Abdulla Muththalib	17 November 2023	Incumbent	2 years, 157 days	?	Muizzu	

== See also ==
- List of ministries of the Maldives
