= Naifaru =

Naifaru ނައިފަރު
- Inhabited island
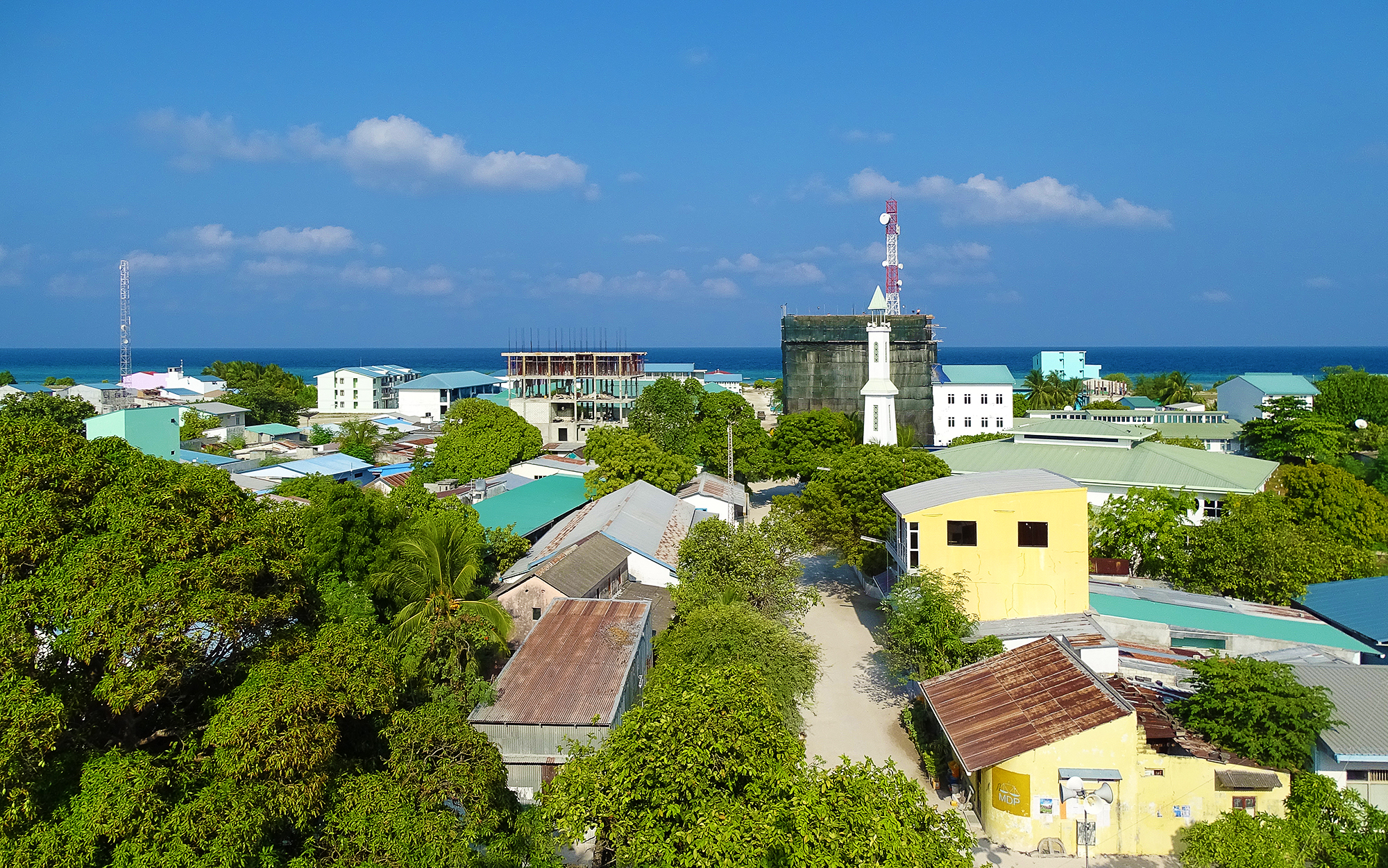

- Location in Maldives
- Coordinates: 5°26′39.74″N 73°21′56.56″E
- Country: Maldives
- Administrative atoll: Faadhippolhu
- Distance to Malé: 200 km (120 mi)

Area
  - Total: 0.5553 km^{2} (0.2144 sq mi)

Dimensions
  - Length: 1.112 km (0.691 mi)
  - Width: 0.725 km (0.450 mi)

Population (2022)
  - Total: 4,832
  - Density: 8,702/km^{2} (22,540/sq mi)
- Including foreigners
- Time zone: UTC+05:00 (MST)

Naifaru (Dhivehi: ނައިފަރު) is an island in the Maldives 144 km (89 mi) north of the capital, Malé. It is the capital and most populous island of Lhaviyani Atoll.

== History ==
According to local historian late Ali Hussain, Naifaru has been inhabited for more than 400 years. He concluded this based on some evidences he observed. among these are:

1. lack of evidence of Naifaru being a big town historically, like the abandoned cemeteries, foundations and rocky mounds of the buried stupas from the Buddhist era like of which we find in some other islands of the atoll like Maafilaafushi, Dhiffushimaidhoo. And lack of any record which mention Naifaru being a populated place historically.
2. Written record of a political prisoner named Hussain Velaanaa Thakurufaanu (Hussain Shah Bandhar) being banished to Naifaru in 1116 AH (1704–1705 CE). Since political prisoners are banished to islands with small populations, Ali Hussain concludes it must not have been very long since Naifaru was inhabited.
3. Written record of the endowment of Raafushi Island to Naifaru Kuda Miskiy (small mosque) in 1197 AH (1783 CE). Ali Hussain estimates it would take about two centuries for an island to populate enough to have an endowment be registered to its mosque.
4. Observed dates from local cemetery tombstones which goes back to 12th century AH (17th century CE)
5. A huge tombstone which was erected to the west of Hukuru Miskiy (Friday Mosque); according to local oral tradition it belonged to a martyr of the Battle of Dhonakulhi which took place in 1167 AH (1753 CE)

Looking at all these evidences, Ali Hussain concludes Naifaru was inhabited at around 1000 AH (1591 CE).

Ali Hussain also saw a written document which says that when islands like Dhiffushimaidhoo and Huruvalhi were inhabited islands, Naifaru and Madivaru were uninhabited islands leased to a citizen of Huruvalhi. He had employed a group of people from Raa Atoll Kothaafaru to get toddy from palm trees of Naifaru and Madivaru. When a fight broke out in Huruvalhi, he came to Naifaru with his family and inhabited it. Ali Hussain says, he neither accepts this narration nor rejects it.

== Geography ==
Naifaru is at 5.4444°′ north latitude and 73.3657°′ east longitude. The island is 141.23 km (88 mi; 76 nmi) north of the country's capital, Malé. The total area of Naifaru is 55.5 hectares (0.555 km^{2}), including the part of the island expanded in 2004 by reclaiming the surrounding lagoon of the island.

=== Climate ===
Naifaru has a tropical monsoon climate (Köppen: Am).

Climate data for Naifaru
Month	Jan	Feb	Mar	Apr	May	Jun	Jul	Aug	Sep	Oct	Nov	Dec	Year
Mean daily maximum °C (°F)	27.4 (81.3)	27.7 (81.9)	28.4 (83.1)	28.9 (84.0)	28.7 (83.7)	28.4 (83.1)	28.1 (82.6)	28.0 (82.4)	27.8 (82.0)	27.8 (82.0)	27.7 (81.9)	27.6 (81.7)	28.0 (82.5)
Daily mean °C (°F)	26.9 (80.4)	27.2 (81.0)	27.8 (82.0)	28.1 (82.6)	27.9 (82.2)	27.7 (81.9)	27.4 (81.3)	27.3 (81.1)	27.1 (80.8)	27.1 (80.8)	26.9 (80.4)	26.9 (80.4)	27.4 (81.2)
Mean daily minimum °C (°F)	26.3 (79.3)	26.6 (79.9)	27.2 (81.0)	27.2 (81.0)	26.9 (80.4)	26.8 (80.2)	26.5 (79.7)	26.5 (79.7)	26.2 (79.2)	26.2 (79.2)	26.1 (79.0)	26.2 (79.2)	26.6 (79.8)
Average precipitation mm (inches)	63.6 (2.50)	38.2 (1.50)	54.1 (2.13)	97.0 (3.82)	230.0 (9.06)	131.3 (5.17)	144.1 (5.67)	152.7 (6.01)	180.7 (7.11)	201.0 (7.91)	209.7 (8.26)	185.1 (7.29)	1,687.5 (66.43)
Source: Weather.Directory

== Demography ==
Historical population
Year	Pop.	±%
2006	3,687	—
2014	3,868	+4.9%
2022	4,832	+24.9%
Census populations Source:

In 1931, Naifaru had a population of around 1800; in 1979 it has increased to 2810.

As of the 2006 census, Naifaru had population of 3687, contributing 1.23% of total population of the country. Compared to the 2000 census, Naifaru had a slightly negative population growth (-0.09%). This negative change is due to emigration to the Capital.

In the latest census conducted in 2022, Naifaru recorded a residing population of 4832 people. this includes 4114 Maldivians and 718 foreigners.

Naifaru is the 6th most populous town in the Maldives after Malé, Addu City, Fuvahmulah, Kulhudhuffushi, and Thinadhoo.

== Governance ==
=== Municipal Council ===
Secretariat of the Naifaru Council

== Economy ==
=== Fishing ===
Fishing has been the major source of income for the islanders throughout history. The location of the first tuna canning factory in the Maldives was selected to be the nearby island of Felivaru due to the high number of catch by the people. Fishing is still a major source of income for the island, although working in resort islands has gained popularity among the youth in the last few years.

=== Retail business ===
Naifaru has more than 120 shops and markets that serve the island population as well the atoll population. These include hardware stores, food and consumer product stores, electronic shops, building materials, fabric stores, boutiques and automobile showrooms.

=== Guest houses ===
There are two guest houses in operation in Naifaru.

== Transportation ==
There are two passenger boats operating between Naifaru and the capital Male; it takes about nine hours on the sea in order to reach the destination. A passenger boat from Dhaalu atoll travels between Naifaru and Male.

== Healthcare ==
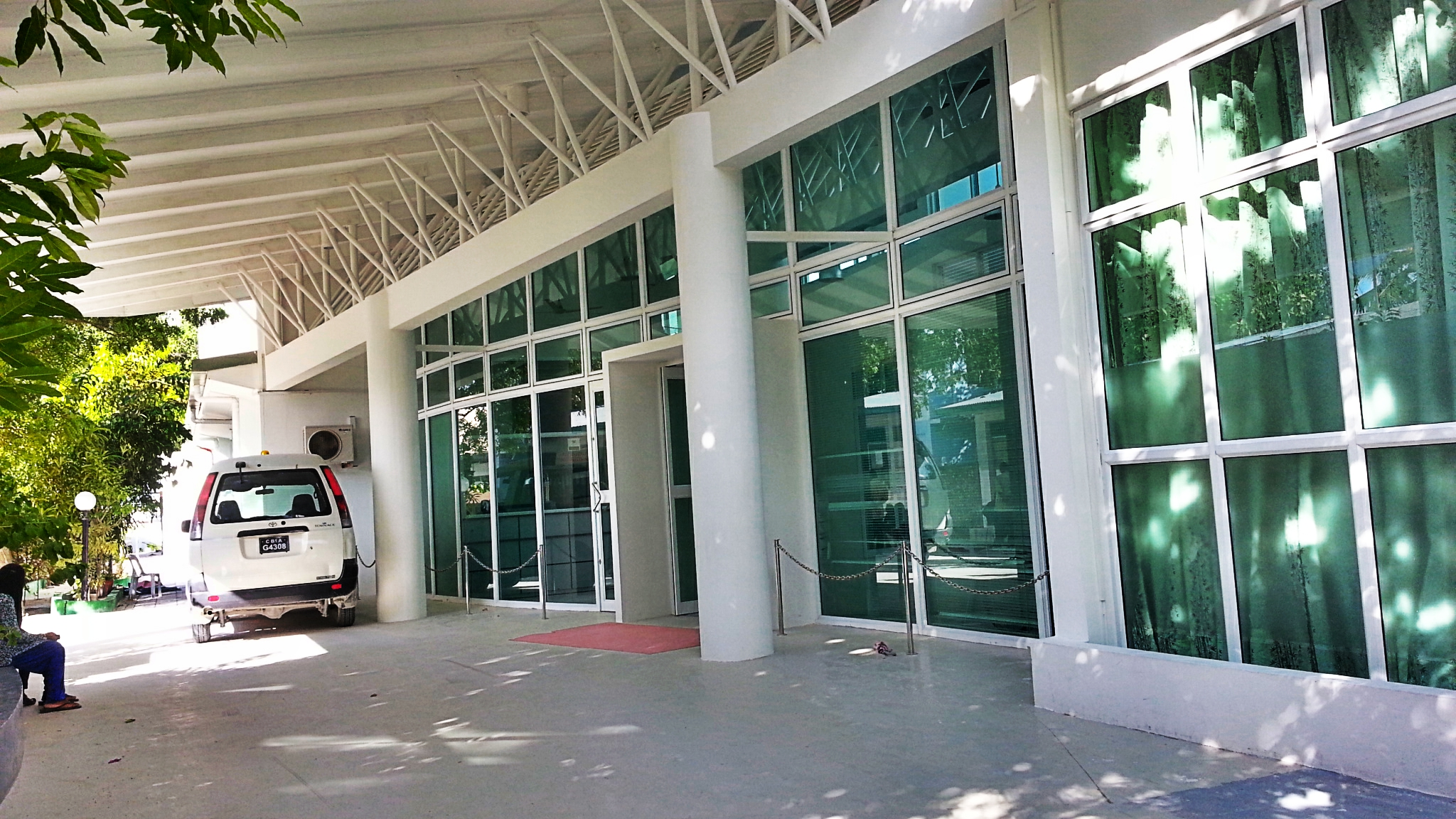
Lhaviyani Atoll Hospital

Lhaviyani Atoll Hospital (LHAH) is the only medical facility in Naifaru. It is the state level hospital of Lhaviyani Atoll and so people from Naifaru and people from neighboring islands and atolls visit it for medical procedures.

== Education ==
=== Secondary and primary education ===
Madhrasathul Ifthithaah is the second oldest education institute in the country. It was inaugurated in the year 1933 by the Naifaru born scholar and Judge Abdullah Fahmi Didi (Jalaluddin). It teaches students from LKG, UKG, Grade 1 up to grade 12. Students of grade 10 do the Cambridge O' levels and after finishing grade 12 they sit in Edexcel A-level examinations.

=== Preschool ===
Until 2023, Naifaru had three preschools; Nooraanee Preschool (NPS), Roashanee Preschool (RPS) and Zoom Tuition. NPS and RPS were managed by the local council while Zoom tuition was a private school. NPS and RPS are the oldest preschools in the Maldives. Nooraanee Preschool was opened in 1947. In 2017 the name of Roashanee Preschool changed to Iqra International Preschool.
