= Adam Shareef =

Maldivian government official (born 1964)

Adam Shareef Umar
- އާދަމް ޝަރީފް ޢުމަރު
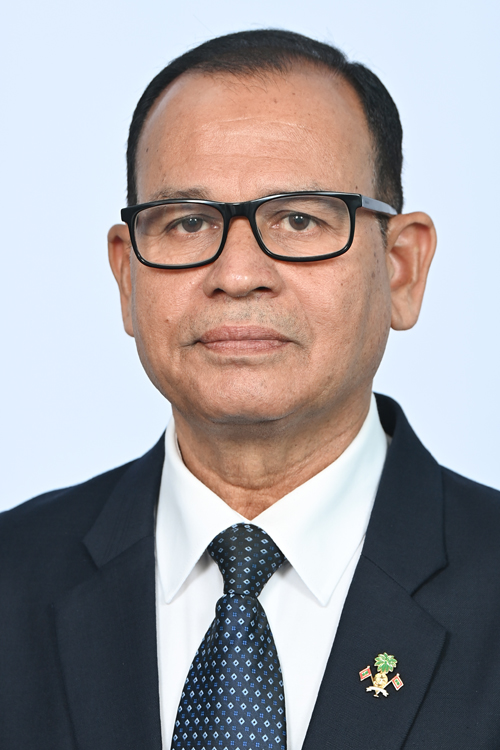
- Official portrait, 2026

Ambassador–designate of the Maldives to Qatar
- Incumbent
- Assumed office 25 June 2026
- President: Mohamed Muizzu

Minister of Cities, Local Government and Public Works
- In office 17 November 2023 – 14 April 2026
- President: Mohamed Muizzu
- Preceded by: Ministry created
- Succeeded by: Ministry abolished

Member of the People's Majlis
- In office 28 May 2019 – 17 November 2023
- President: Ibrahim Mohamed Solih
- Preceded by: Mohamed Ameeth Ahmed Manik
- Succeeded by: Ahmed Zahir
- Constituency: Maduvvari

Minister of Defence and National Security
- In office 28 October 2015 – 17 November 2018
- President: Abdulla Yameen
- Preceded by: Moosa Ali Jaleel
- Succeeded by: Mariya Ahmed Didi

Minister of State for Education
- In office 2014 – 28 October 2015
- President: Abdulla Yameen

Personal details
- Born: 12 December 1964 (age 61) Fainu, Raa Atoll, Maldives
- Party: People's National Congress
- Spouse: Zeenaz Adnan
- Children: 6
- Education: University of East Anglia

Adam Shareef Umar (Dhivehi: އާދަމް ޝަރީފް ޢުމަރު; born 12 December 1964) is a Maldivian politician and diplomat who is currently serving as the Ambassador-designate of the Maldives to Qatar since 2026. He previously served as the Minister of Cities, Local Government and Public Works of the Maldives from 2023 to 2026.

== Early life and education ==
Adam Shareef Umar was born on 12 December 1964 in Fainu, Raa Atoll.

Shareef obtained a master's degree in education from the University of East Anglia.

== Career ==
He served as Minister of Defense and National Security during the presidency of Abdulla Yameen. Prior to that, he served as the Minister of State for Education from 2014 to 2015.

He was also a Special Envoy of President Yameen to attend Abdul Sattar Moosa Didi's funeral.

He was a Member of the 19th People's Majlis for the Madduvari Constituency. He is also the Deputy Leader of the People's National Congress (PNC).

On 17 November 2023, President Mohamed Muizzu appointed Umar as the Minister of Cities, Local Government and Public Works. On 14 April 2026, Umar resigned as the minister. He was later reappointed as an Ambassador-at-Large at the Ministry of Foreign Affairs. On 14 June 2026, President Muizzu sent Shareef's name as the Maldivian Ambassador to Qatar to the People's Majlis, which they approved. On 25 June, they were formally appointed.
