= Heena Waleed =

Maldivian government official

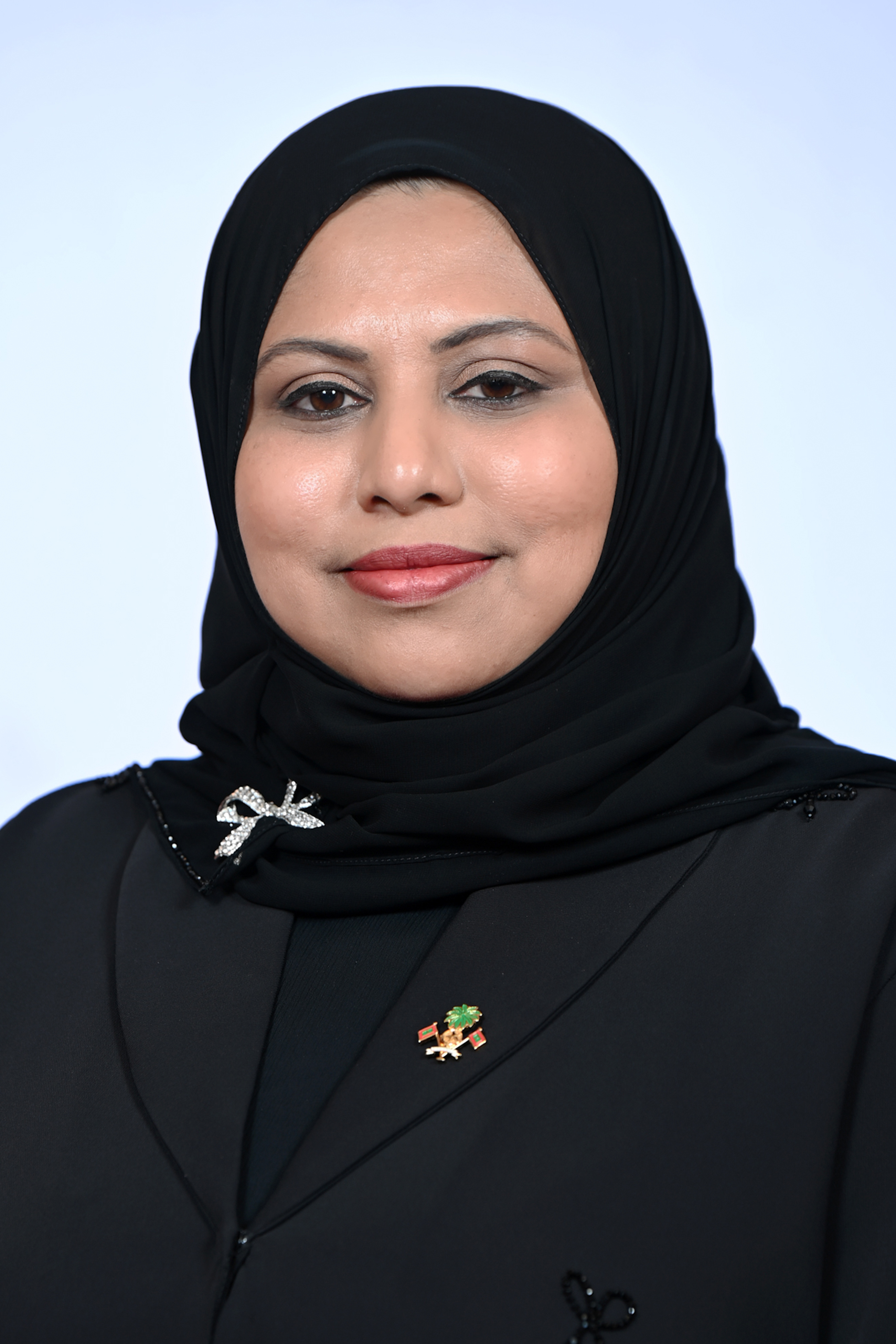
- Official portrait, 2026

Minister of Arts, Culture and Heritage
- Incumbent
- Assumed office 14 April 2026
- President: Mohamed Muizzu
- Preceded by: Adam Naseer Ibrahim

Spokesperson of the President's Office
- In office 23 April 2024 – 14 April 2026
- President: Mohamed Muizzu
- Preceded by: Mohamed Shahyb
- Succeeded by: Mohamed Hussain Shareef

Managing Director of the National Social Protection Agency
- In office 29 November 2023 – 14 April 2026

Personal details
- Born: Hithadhoo, Addu City, Seenu Atoll, Maldives
- Party: People's National Congress
- Other political affiliations: Progressive Party of Maldives

Heena Waleed (Dhivehi: ހީނާ ވަލީދް) is a Maldivian politician who is currently serving as the Minister of Arts, Culture and Heritage of the Maldives since 2026. She is also the spokesperson of the People's National Congress.

She previously served as the spokesperson for The President's Office and managing director for the National Social Protection Agency as well.

== Career ==
Heena previously served as a Council member for the Progressive Party of Maldives (PPM) before she became a Spokesperson for PPM's partner, People's National Congress (PNC). She was also a journalist and had filled positions such as deputy editor and news executive editor at Television Maldives (TVM), and has served several high ranking positions such as Head of News at P.S.M. She also served as the Political Director of the Ministry of Foreign Affairs. In 2023, she was appointed as the Managing Director of the National Social Protection Agency (NSPA).

On 14 April 2026, Waleed was appointed by President Mohamed Muizzu as the Minister of Arts, Culture and Heritage.

== Corruption allegations ==
In 2024, Heena Waleed faced corruption allegations as Managing Director of the National Social Protection Agency (NSPA). Protests demanded her resignation, citing mismanagement and difficulties in accessing social services under her leadership.

A key allegation involved leasing office space for NSPA through Maldives Media House, linked to President Mohamed Muizzu. NSPA reportedly agreed to pay MVR 580,000 per month, totaling MVR 34.8 million over five years, raising concerns about transparency and misuse of funds.

Reports revealed that the funds were used to establish MMTV, a TV channel allegedly created to promote President Muizzu. Maldives Media House, which leased the building, was linked to Muizzu through Abdulla Zahir, a family member managing his residence. Two floors were rented to NSPA while the other floors housed the TV station. The contract was only terminated after public criticism following its exposure on social media by Hassan Kurusee. The case is still under investigation, and no actions have been taken against those involved.
