= Adam Naseer Ibrahim =

Maldivian politician

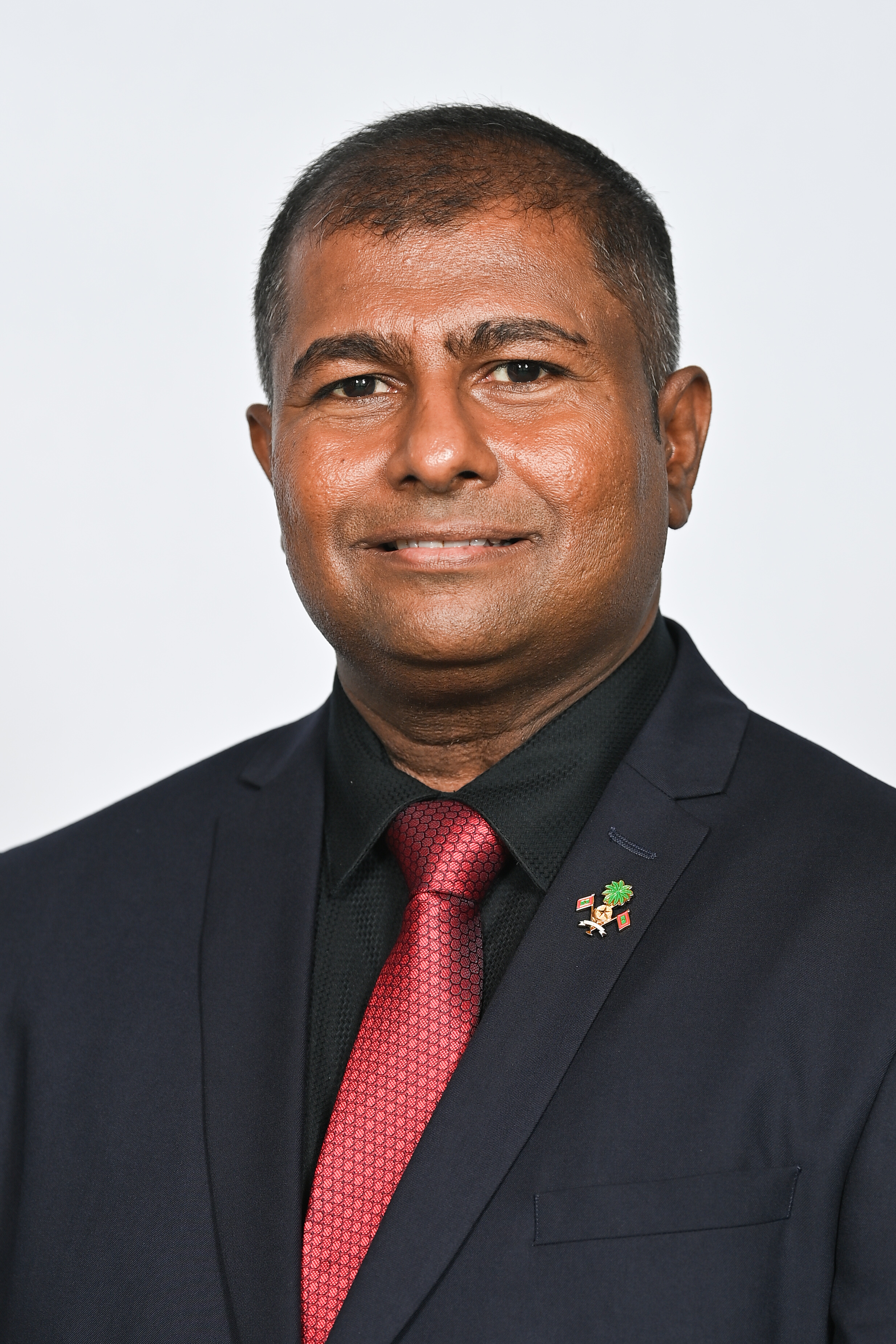
- Official portrait, 2023

Minister of Dhivehi Language, Culture and Heritage
- In office 17 November 2023 – 14 April 2026
- President: Mohamed Muizzu
- Preceded by: Yumna Maumoon
- Succeeded by: Heena Waleed

Personal details
- Born: Thoddoo, Alif Alif Atoll, Maldives
- Party: People's National Congress (Maldives)
- Website: adamnaseeribrahim.com

Adam Naseer Ibrahim is a Maldivian politician and researcher who served as the Minister of Dhivehi Language, Culture and Heritage since 17 November 2023 to 14 April 2026.

== Career ==
He received the National Youth Award in 2007 for his contributions to poetry and literature. He served as a lecturer at the Islamic University of Maldives for 29 years.
