= Fainu =

Fainu ފައިނު
- Inhabited island
- Location in Maldives
- Coordinates: 5°27′48″N 73°02′05″E
- Country: Maldives
- Administrative atoll: Raa Atoll
- Distance to Malé: 151.84 km (94.35 mi)

Government
  - Body: R. Fainu Council
  - President: Ahmed Rishfan

Dimensions
  - Length: 1.325 km (0.823 mi)
  - Width: 0.500 km (0.311 mi)

Population (2022)
  - Total: 423
- Time zone: UTC+05:00 (MST)

Fainu (Dhivehi: ފައިނު) is one of the inhabited islands of Raa Atoll. Fainu is situated in Raa Atoll which is officially known as North Maalhosmadulu Atoll. The island is located between the Kinolhas and Inguraidhoo. The island is 151.84 km (94 mi; 82 nmi) north of the country's capital, Malé. From Fainu in a normal boat it takes about over 8 hours to reach capital city Malé.

== Ecology ==
Issues such as environmental degradation remain prominent. Maldives Human Development Report 2000 highlighted the poor irrigation system at place which is still unchanged. Also, Maldives State of the Environment Report 2002 highlighted the severe beach erosion problem faced by the island (notably the biggest island in Raa Atoll). Moreover, December 2004 - Indian Ocean tsunami left the island as the second most devastated in the atoll.

In 2018, a controversial project by the Maldivian government was set to destroy two-thirds of the vegetation of the island including dense jungle and cultivation land, to build an airport and luxury hotel on the island. The project will confine the residents of the island to just the settlement and they will lose access to half of the island's beach area. Activists have been campaigning raising concern about the need for the project when there is a domestic airport just 25 minutes away

== Demography ==
Historical population
Year	Pop.	±%
2006	251	—
2014	304	+21.1%
2022	423	+39.1%
2006-2022: Census populations Source:

== Education ==
Being a small population, the island faces many challenges. Children's education remains a critical issue with every single child having to leave the island for secondary school. The first foreign teacher ever in the history of Fainu School started working in the academic year 2006.

== Health ==
On 31 May 2004, the island won the award for no-smoking by the World Health Organization.

== Gallery ==
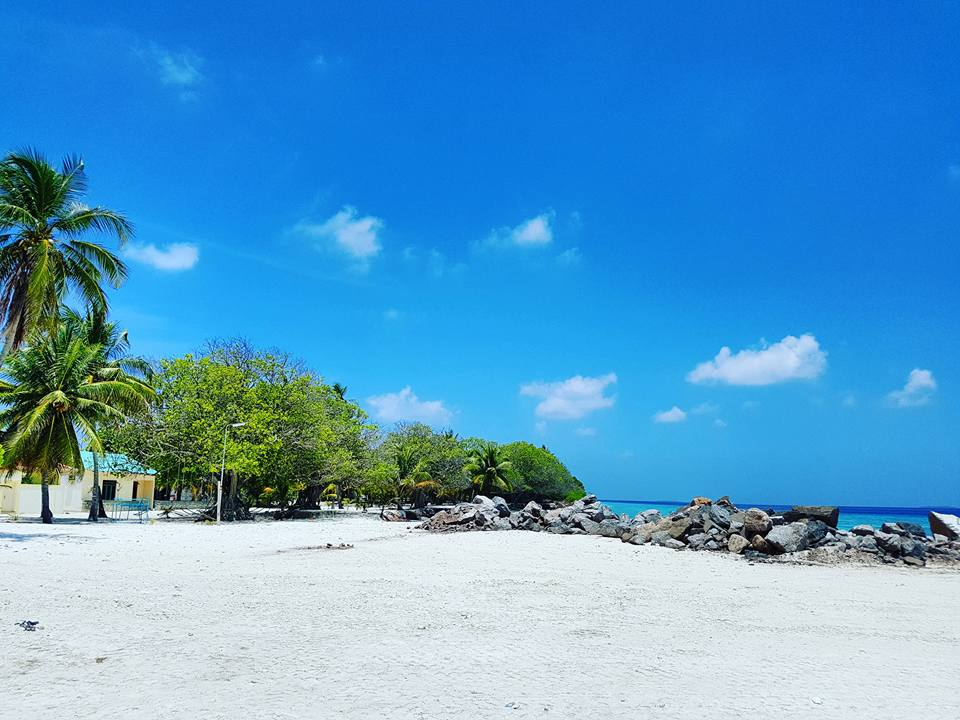

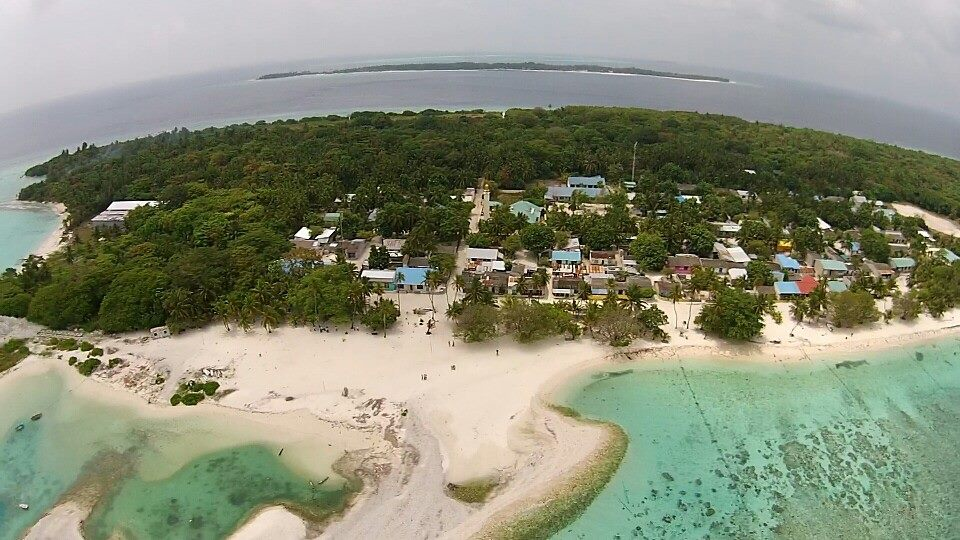

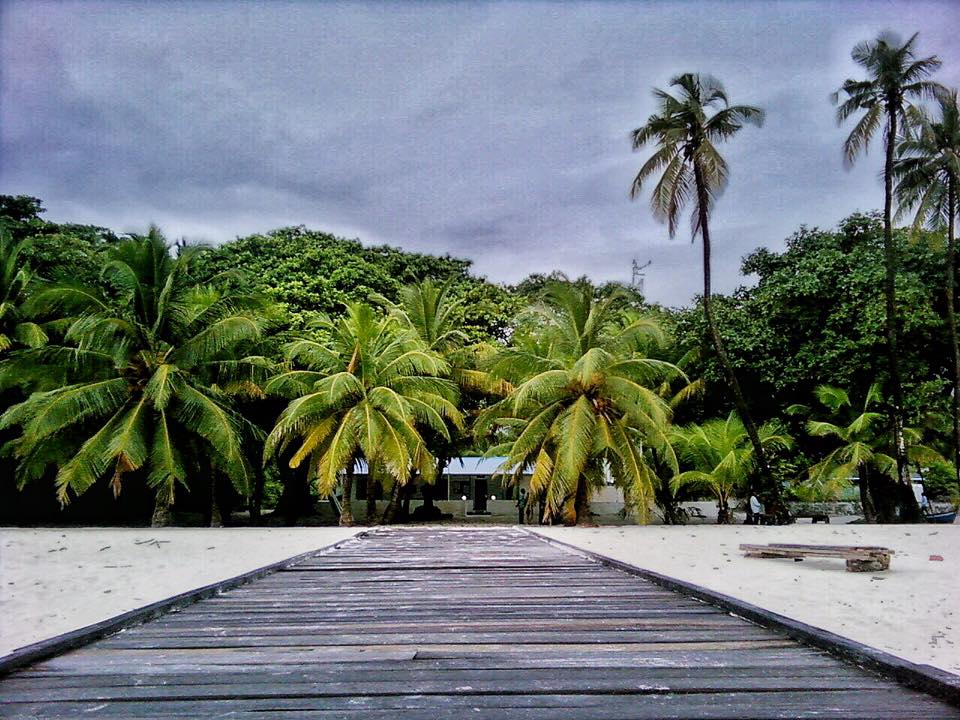
