= Ibrahim Waheed =

Maldivian politician (born 1990)

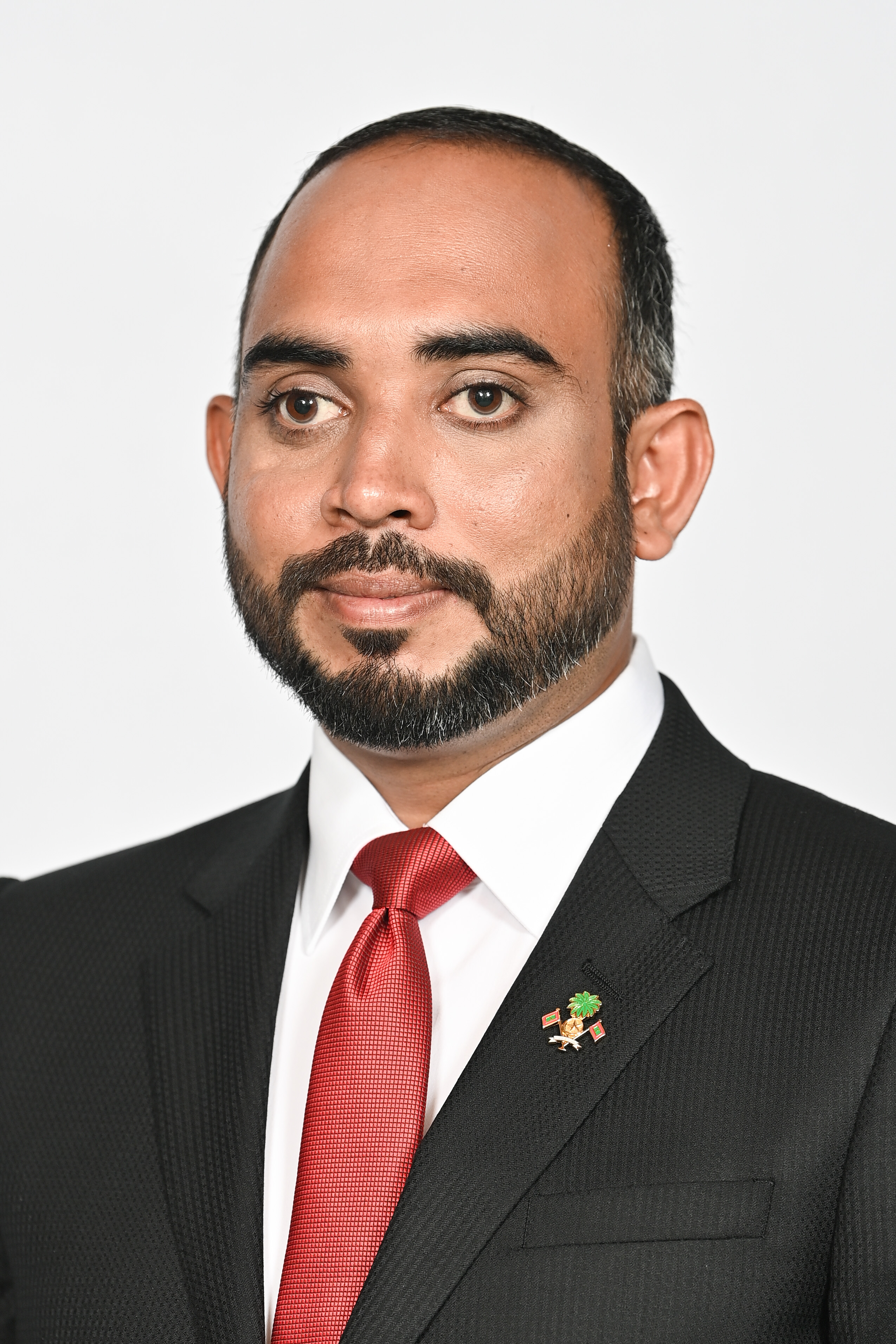

Minister of Youth Empowerment, Information and Arts
- In office 17 November 2023 – 14 April 2026
- President: Mohamed Muizzu
- Preceded by: (Ministry established)
- Succeeded by: (Ministry dissolved)

Personal details
- Born: Dhevvadhoo, Gaafu Alifu Atoll, Maldives
- Party: Independent
- Other political affiliations: Maldivian Democratic Party; Maldives Third Way Democrats; Progressive Party of Maldives

Ibrahim Waheed, popularly known as Asward, is a Maldivian politician who is served as the Minister of Youth Empowerment, Information and Arts from 2023 to 2026.

== Career ==
He got his higher education in Journalism. He is the current CEO of SanguTV, the previous Deputy CEO of RaajjeTV. He contested in the MDP primaries for the 2014 Maldivian parliamentary elections, he later left the MDP and ran for the Thulusdhoo parliamentary seat on a MTD ticket.
