= Ministry of Fisheries, Agriculture and Ocean Resources =

Government ministry responsible for fisheries in the Maldives

Ministry of Fisheries and Ocean Resources
- މަސްވެރިކަމާއި ދަނޑުވެރިކަމާއި ކަނޑުގެ ވަސީލަތްތަކާ ބެހޭ ވުޒާރާ Masverikamaai Dhanduverikamaai Kan'duge Vaseelaiythakaa Behey Vuzaaraa

Agency overview
- Jurisdiction: Government of the Maldives
- Headquarters: Velaanage, Malé, Maldives
- Agency executive: Ahmed Shiyam, Minister of Fisheries and Ocean Resources
- Website: fisheries.gov.mv

The Ministry of Fisheries, Agriculture and Ocean Resources (Dhivehi: މަސްވެރިކަމާއި ދަނޑުވެރިކަމާއި ކަނޑުގެ ވަސީލަތްތަކާ ބެހޭ ވުޒާރާ) is a Maldivian government ministry tasked with optimising the productivity, sustainability of fisheries and ocean resources using effective regulation.

== Ministers ==
No.	Portrait	Name (born-died)	Term			Political party	Government	Ref.
No.	Portrait	Name (born-died)	Took office	Left office	Time in office	Political party	Government	Ref.
Ministry of Fisheries and Agriculture
1	Ibrahim Didi	Ibrahim Didi	12 November 2008	29 June 2010	1 year, 229 days	MDP	Nasheed	
1	Ibrahim Didi	Ibrahim Didi	07 July 2010	11 December 2010	157 days	MDP	Nasheed	
-	Aminath Jameel	Aminath Jameel; Acting	11 December 2010	28 March 2011	107 days	?	Nasheed	
-	Mohamed Aslam	Mohamed Aslam	28 March 2011	19 July 2011	113 days	MDP	Nasheed	
1	Ibrahim Didi	Ibrahim Didi	19 July 2011	07 February 2012	203 days	MDP	Nasheed	
2	Ahmed Shafeeu	Ahmed Shafeeu	12 March 2012	17 November 2013	1 year, 250 days	?	Waheed	
3	Mohamed Shainee	Mohamed Shainee	19 November 2013	17 November 2018	4 years, 363 days	PPM	Yameen	
Ministry of Fisheries, Marine Resources and Agriculture
4	Zaha Waheed	Zaha Waheed	17 November 2018	05 May 2021	2 years, 169 days	?	Solih	
5	Hussain Rasheed Hassan	Hussain Rasheed Hassan	05 May 2021	17 November 2023	2 years, 196 days	JP	Solih	
Ministry of Fisheries and Ocean Resources
6	Ahmed Shiyam	Ahmed Shiyam	17 November 2023	Incumbent	2 years, 158 days	PNC	Muizzu	
