= International Islamic College =

College in Kuala Lumpur, Malaysia

Coordinates: 3.2240215°N 101.6884392°E

- Kolej Islam Antarabangsa (Malay) الكلية لإسلامية العالمية (Arabic)
- Emblem
- Type: Private
- Established: 2001; 25 years ago
- Parent institution: IIUM Higher Education
- Accreditation: Malaysian Qualifications Agency
- Affiliations: International Islamic University Malaysia (IIUM)
- Chairman: Dato' Abdul Majit Ahmad Khan
- Location: Kuala Lumpur, Malaysia
- Campus: Urban
- Language: English; Malay; Arabic
- Colours: Gold
- Website: www.iic.edu.my

The International Islamic College (IIC; Malay: Kolej Islam Antarabangsa; Arabic: الكلية لإسلامية العالمية) is a private college located in Taman Batu Muda, Kuala Lumpur, Malaysia. The college was established in 2001 as a private higher education institution and is one of the private higher education institutions in Malaysia. It is owned by the International Islamic University Malaysia (IIUM) through its wholly-owned subsidiary, IIUM Higher Education.

== Campus ==
The first campus of the IIC was at the 4th miles, Jalan Gombak, opposite of the Saad Abi Waqqas mosque. In April 2005, the college moved to the current complex at Jalan 31/10A, Taman Batu Muda, 68100 Kuala Lumpur. The neighboring academic institution at the area are the Kolej Unikop and Pusrawi International College of Medical Science (PICOMS). The new complex is bigger and can accommodate more students.

== Schools and centres ==
IIC consisted of five schools and one Pusat Bertauliah. They are as follows:

- Faculty of Information and Communication Technology (FICT)
- Faculty of Social Sciences (FSS)
- Faculty of Business Management (FBM)
- Faculty of Languages and Communication (FLC)
- Faculty of Law and Enforcement (FLE)
- Pusat Bertauliah International Islamic College (PBIIC) (TVET)

== Courses ==
Currently the IIC offers one foundation course, 3 certificate level courses, 30 diploma level courses and 9 TVET courses.

=== Foundations ===
- Foundation in Arts

=== Certificate programmes ===
- Certificate in Business Administration (CBA)
- Certificate in Early Childhood Education (CCE)
- Certificate in English (CPE)

=== Diploma programmes ===
- Diploma in Computer Science (DCS)
- Diploma in Information Technology (DIT)
- Diploma in Information Technology ODL (DIT-ODL)
- Diploma in Creative Animation (DCA)
- Diploma in Graphic Design (DGD)
- Diploma in Interactive Multimedia (DIM)
- Diploma in Business Administration (DBA)
- Diploma in Business Administration ODL (DBA-ODL)
- Diploma in Accounting (DIA)
- Diploma in Office Management and Secretaryship (DMS)
- Diploma in Islamic Banking and Finance (DBF)
- Diploma in Enforcement Management (DEM)
- Diploma in Marketing Management (DMM)
- Diploma in Risk Management (DRM)
- Diploma in Islamic Early Childhood Education (DCE)
- Diploma in Contemporary Islamic Sciences (DIC)
- Diploma in Halal Industry Management (DHM)
- Diploma in Psychology (DIP)

=== TVET courses ===
- DKM PENYELIAAN PENGASUHAN DAN PENDIDIKAN PERKEMBANGAN AWAL KANAK-KANAK (Tahap 4)
- DKM PENYELIAAN PENGASUHAN DAN PENDIDIKAN PERKEMBANGAN AWAL KANAK-KANAK (Tahap 3 & 4)
- DKM PENGURUSAN PENTADBIRAN (SETIAUSAHA KORPORAT EKSEKUTIF) (Tahap 3 & 4)
- DKM PENGURUSAN PENTADBIRAN (Tahap 3 & 4)
- DKM PENTADBIRAN PENGAJARAN DAN PENDIDIKAN PRA SEKOLAH (Tahap 3 & 4)
- DKM PEMBANGUNAN KANDUNGAN KREATIF (Tahap 3 & 4)
- SKM PENGASUHAN DAN PENDIDIKAN AWAL KANAK-KANAK (Tahap 3)
- SKM PENGURUSAN MASJID (Tahap 3)
- SKM OPERASI PENJAGAAN WARGA EMAS (Tahap 3)

== See also ==
- International Islamic University Malaysia (IIUM)
