= Maryam Mariya =

Maldivian politician

- މަރިޔަމް މާރިޔާ
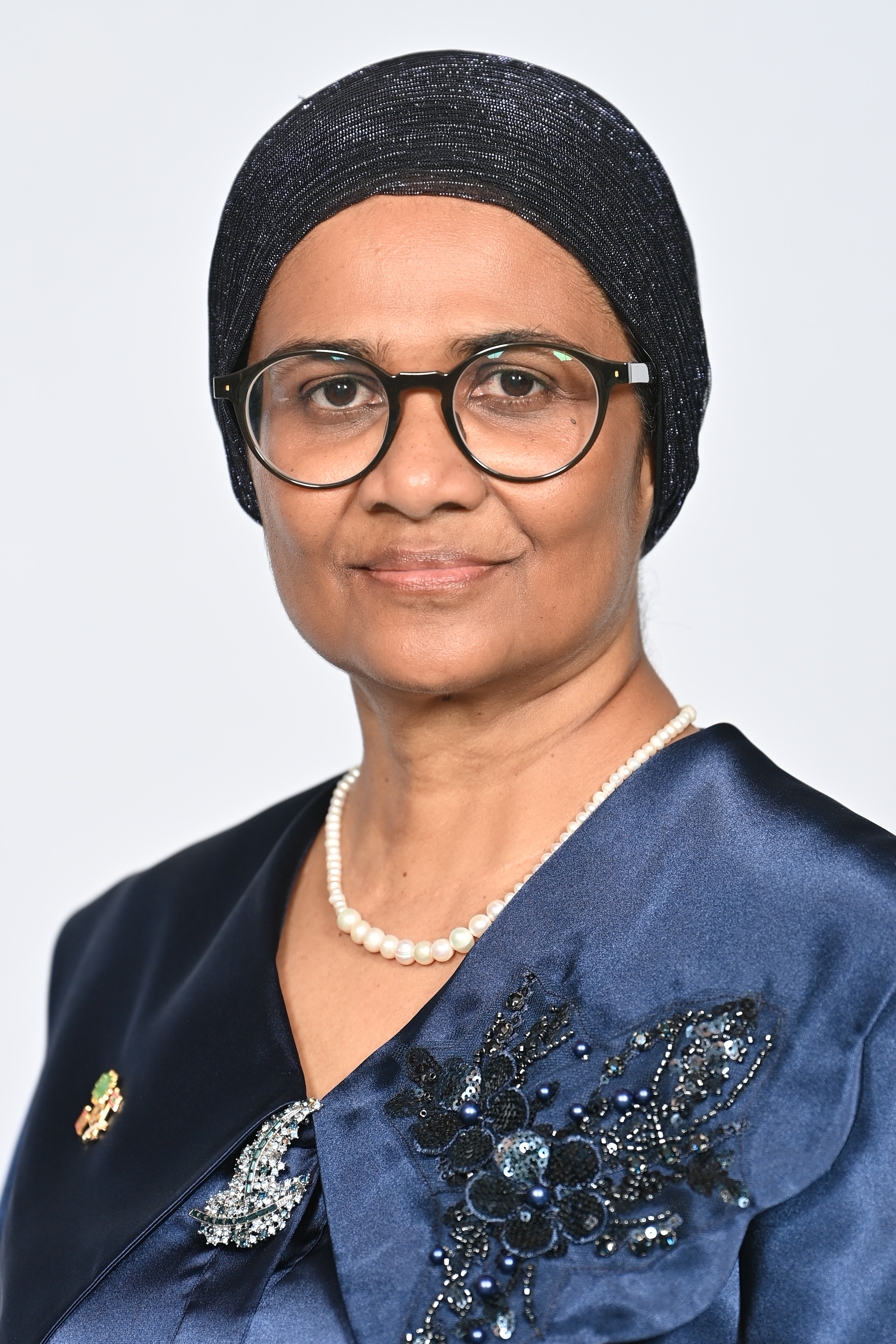

Minister of Agriculture and Animal Welfare
- In office 26 December 2024 – 14 April 2026
- President: Mohamed Muizzu
- Preceded by: Aishath Rameela
- Succeeded by: (Ministry dissolved)

Minister of Higher Education, Labour and Skills Development
- In office 17 November 2023 – 26 December 2024
- President: Mohamed Muizzu
- Preceded by: Ibrahim Hassan
- Succeeded by: Ali Haidar Ahmed

Personal details
- Born: Machchangolhi, Malé, Maldives
- Relations: Yoosuf Maaniu Mohamed (brother)
- Education: National Institute of Education; University of Canberra; Massey University; University of Waikato

Maryam Mariya is a Maldivian politician who served as the Minister of Agriculture and Animal Welfare of the Maldives from 2024 to 2026. She previously served as the Minister of Higher Education, Labour and Skills Development from 2023 to 2024.

== Early life and education ==
Born in Malé, Mariya was the daughter of businessman Mohamed Yoosuf (Kuwaa Mohadhey).

Mariya got a diploma in TESL at the National Institute of Education in 1998. She got an MA TESOL at the University of Canberra, Australia and a PhD in Applied Linguistics at the Massey University. She received postgraduate teaching and learning at the University of Waikato, New Zealand, where she was a Research Associate.

== Career ==
Mariya had worked at various educational institutes such as the Maldives National University, Villa College, the Islamic University of Maldives.

On 17 November 2023, Mariya was appointed by President Mohamed Muizzu as the Minister of Higher Education, Labour and Skills Development. In December 2024, she was assigned to oversee the Agriculture Ministry following the restructuring of ministries. President Muizzu later appointed her as the Minister of Agriculture and Animal Welfare. On 14 April 2026, Mariya resigned en masse with other cabinet ministers.

On 14 September 2026, Mariya was appointed as an Ambassador-at-Large.
