= Ministry of Health, Family and Welfare =

Government ministry of the Maldives

- ޞިއްޙަތާއި ޢާއިލާއާއި އިޖުތިމާއީ އެހީއާ ބެހޭ ވުޒާރާ Sihhathaai Aailaa-aai Ijjuthimaaee Ehee-aa Behey Vuzaaraa

Agency overview
- Jurisdiction: Government of the Maldives
- Headquarters: Velaanaage
- Minister responsible: Geela Ali
- Deputy Ministers responsible: Ibrahim Nasir, Deputy Minister of Health; Ismail Zahir, Deputy Minister of Health; Aminath Ismail, Deputy Minister of Health; Mohamed Fiznee, Deputy Minister of Health
- Agency executives: Khadeeja Abdul Samad Abdulla, Minister of State for Health; Ismail Abdulla, Minister of State for Health; Ahmed Gasim, Minister of State for Health; Aminath Shirna, Minister of State for Health
- Website: health.gov.mv

The Ministry of Health, Family and Welfare of the Republic of Maldives is a government ministry in the Maldives. It is directly responsible for the health and wellbeing of the Citizens of Maldives.

== List of Health ministers ==
List of Health ministers
Minister	Term	President
Ilyas Ibrahim	?-2008	Maumoon Abdul Gayoom
Dr. Aminath Jameel	12 November 2008 - 29 June 2010	Mohamed Nasheed
Dr. Aminath Jameel	7 July 2010 - 7 February 2012	Mohamed Nasheed
Dr. Ahmed Jamsheed Mohamed	7 May 2012 - 31 October 2013	Mohamed Waheed Hassan Manik
Dr. Amal Ali (Acting)	4 November 2013 - 17 November 2013	Mohamed Waheed Hassan Manik
Dr. Mariyam Shakeela	1 July 2014 - 11 August 2014	Abdulla Yameen Abdul Gayoom
Col. (Rtd.) Mohamed Nazim (Acting)	11 August 2014 - 20 January 2015	Abdulla Yameen Abdul Gayoom
Dr. Mohamed Shainee (Acting)	21 January 2015 - 10 March 2015	Abdulla Yameen Abdul Gayoom
Ahmed Zuhoor	10 March 2015 - 17 November 2018	Abdulla Yameen Abdul Gayoom
Abdulla Ameen	17 November 2018 - 21 October 2020	Ibrahim Mohamed Solih
Ahmed Naseem	22 October 2020 - 17 November 2023	Ibrahim Mohamed Solih
Abdulla Khaleel	17 November 2023 - 30 September 2024	Mohamed Muizzu
Abdulla Nazim Ibrahim	30 September 2024 - 14 April 2026	Mohamed Muizzu
Geela Ali	14 April 2026 - Incumbent	Mohamed Muizzu
