= Abdulla Muththalib =

Maldivian government official

- ޢަބްދުﷲ މުއްޠަލިބް
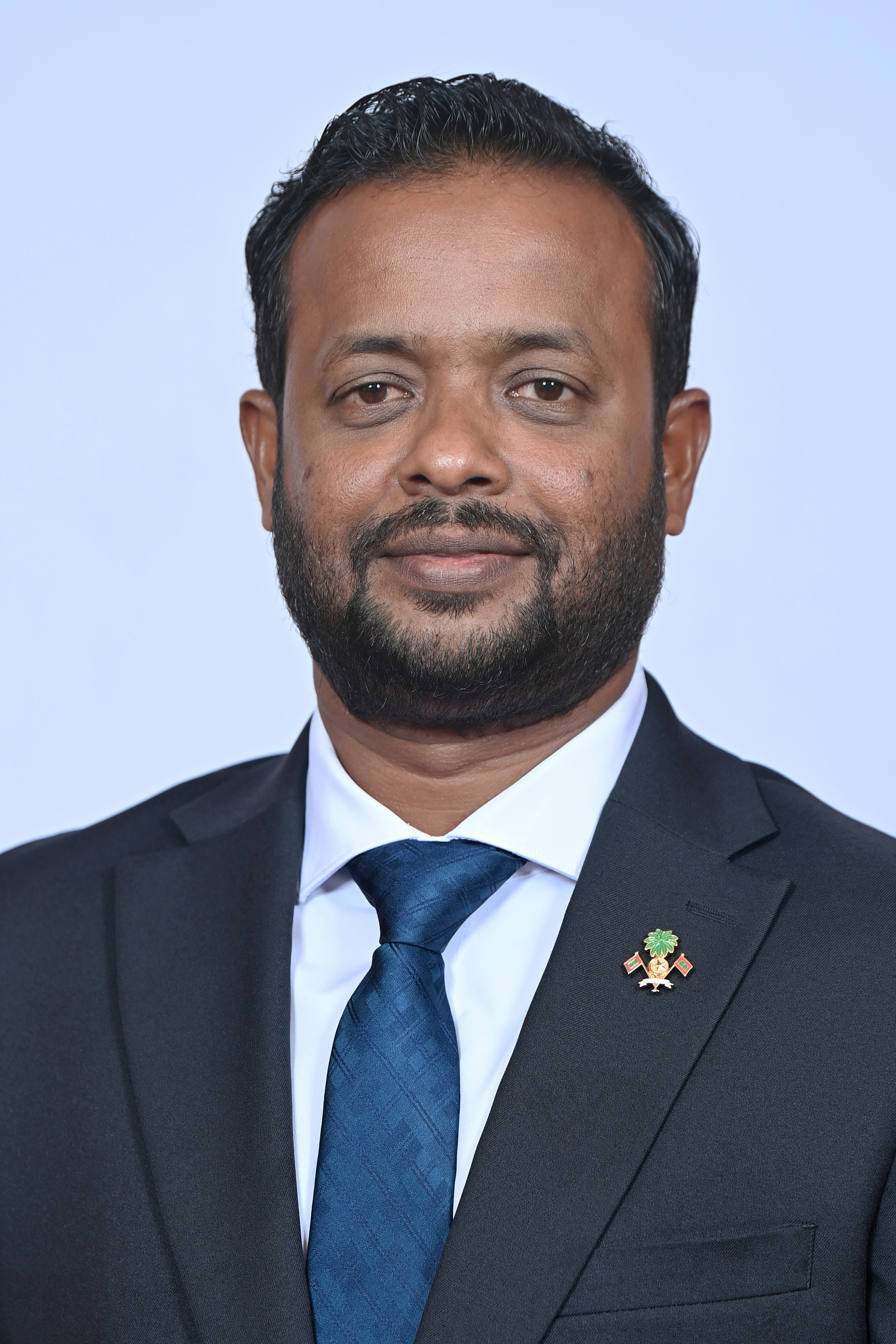
- Official portrait, 2026

Minister of Infrastructure, Housing and Urban Development
- Incumbent
- Assumed office 14 April 2026
- President: Mohamed Muizzu
- Preceded by: Himself

Minister of Construction, Housing and Infrastructure
- In office 24 November 2024 – 14 April 2026
- President: Mohamed Muizzu
- Preceded by: Himself (as Minister of Construction and Infrastructure); Ali Haidar Ahmed (as Housing Minister)
- Succeeded by: Himself

Minister of Construction and Infrastructure
- In office 17 November 2023 – 26 December 2024
- President: Mohamed Muizzu
- Preceded by: (Ministry created)
- Succeeded by: (Ministry abolished)

Deputy Minister of Housing and Infrastructure
- In office 21 November 2013 – 17 November 2018
- President: Abdulla Yameen
- Succeeded by: (Ministry abolished)

Personal details
- Born: Fiyoaree, Gaafu Dhaalu Atoll, Maldives
- Spouse: Aishath Shaina (m. 2013)
- Children: 3
- Education: University College London

Abdulla Muththalib (Dhivehi: ޢަބްދުﷲ މުއްޠަލިބް) is a Maldivian politician who is currently serving as the minister of Infrastructure, Housing and Urban Development since 2026.

== Early life and education ==
Abdulla Muththalib was born in Fiyoaree, Gaafu Dhaalu Atoll. He studied at Malé English School and Centre for Higher Secondary Education (CHSE). During his time as a student in CHSE, he was the school captain. He scored A during A'levels and won Best All Around award and the President's Scholarship. He holds a PhD in civil engineering from University College London.

== Career ==
Muththalib previously served as Mohamed Muizzu's deputy during Muizzu's time as housing minister during the Yameen administration. Before he was deputy, he was the projects department head of the Housing Development Corporation (HDC).

Muththalib was appointed as the minister of Construction and Infrastructure in November 2023 by President Mohamed Muizzu. In December 2024, Muththalib was appointed as the minister of Construction, Housing and Infrastructure. In April 2026, he was appointed as the minister of Infrastructure, Housing and Urban Development.

== Controversies ==
Muththalib faced bribery allegations after a news agency published a video of him carrying a large duffle bag over his shoulder. Netizens believed that it contained money used to bribe lawmakers. Muththalib denied the allegations and said that it was sports equipment.

== Family life ==
Muththalib is married to Shaina. They met during his time as deputy minister, and they have three children together.
