= Abdulla Nazim Ibrahim =

Maldivian politician

- ޢަބުދުﷲ ނާޡިމް އިބްރާހީމް
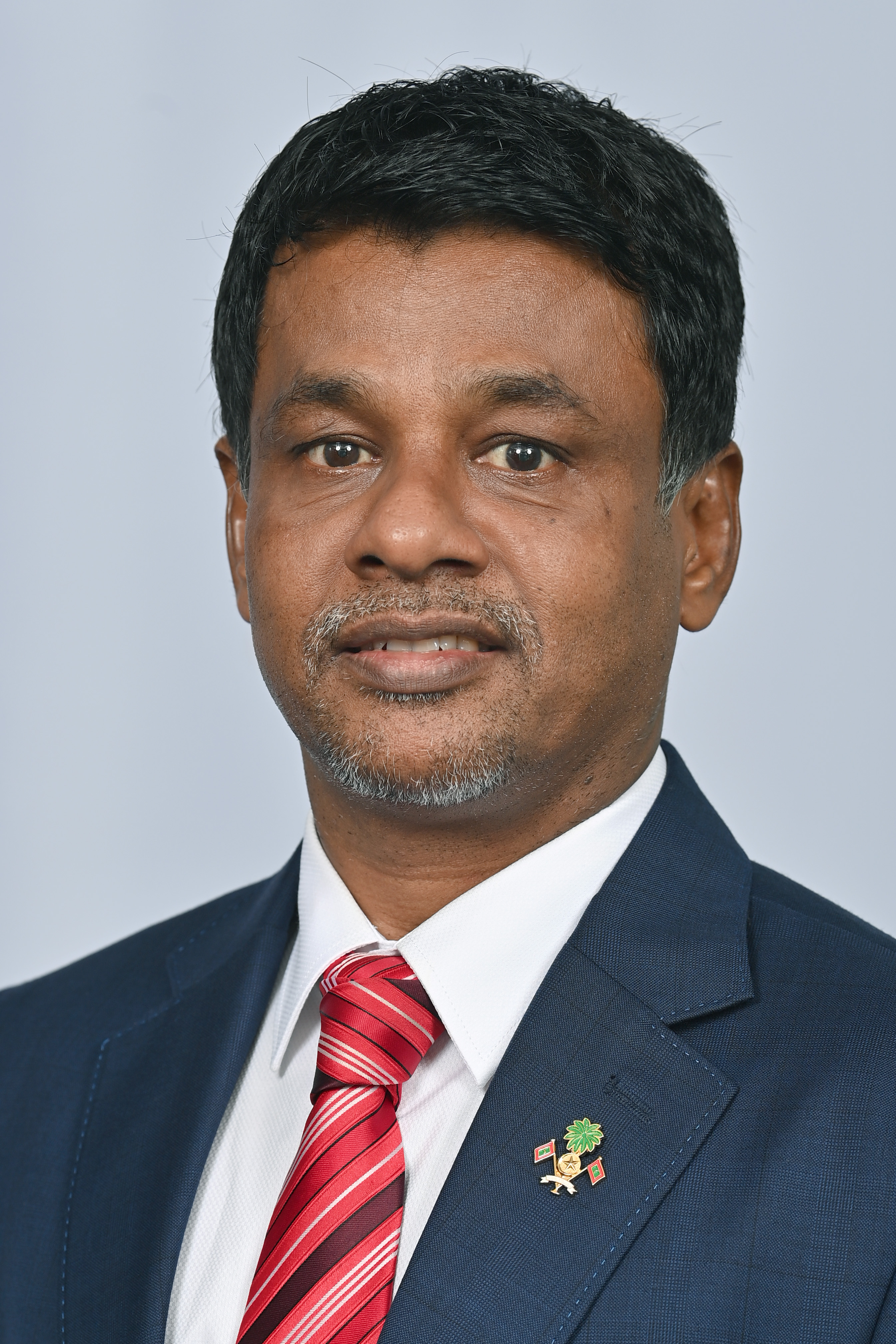
- Official portrait, 2023

Minister of Health
- In office 30 September 2024 – 14 April 2026
- President: Mohamed Muizzu
- Preceded by: Abdulla Khaleel
- In office 22 June 2016 – 17 November 2018
- President: Abdulla Yameen

Principal Secretary to the President on Public Policy
- In office 20 November 2023 – 30 September 2024
- President: Mohamed Muizzu
- Preceded by: Position created
- Succeeded by: Position abolished

Deputy Minister of Education
- In office 2014 – 22 June 2016
- President: Abdulla Yameen

Personal details
- Born: Hinnavaru, Lhaviyani Atoll, Maldives
- Education: University of Auckland

Abdulla Nazim Ibrahim (Dhivehi: ޢަބުދުﷲ ނާޡިމް އިބްރާހީމް) is a Maldivian politician who served as the Minister of Health from 2024 to 2026. He served the same position from 2016 to 2018. He also served as a Deputy Minister of Education.

== Early life and education ==
Nazim was born in Hinnavaru in Lhaviyani Atoll, Maldives. He studied at the Science Education Center (now Centre for Higher Secondary Education) and studied at the University of Auckland.

== Career ==
Nazim first served as the Deputy Minister of Education from 2014 to 2016, where he was appointed as Minister of Health up until 2018. In 2023, he was appointed as Abdulla Yameen's Vice Campaign Manager for the 2023 presidential election. Nazim previously served as the Principal Secretary to the President on Public Policy, before his current role as Minister of Health.

Nazim was appointed as the Minister of Health on 30 September 2024 by President Mohamed Muizzu. On 14 April 2026, he resigned en masse with other ministers.

On 6 June 2026, Ibrahim was appointed as the Principal Secretary to the President on Policy and Manifesto. He resigned on 14 September 2026.
