= Gnaviyani Atoll =

Coordinates: 0°18′S 73°26′E

- Atoll of the Maldives
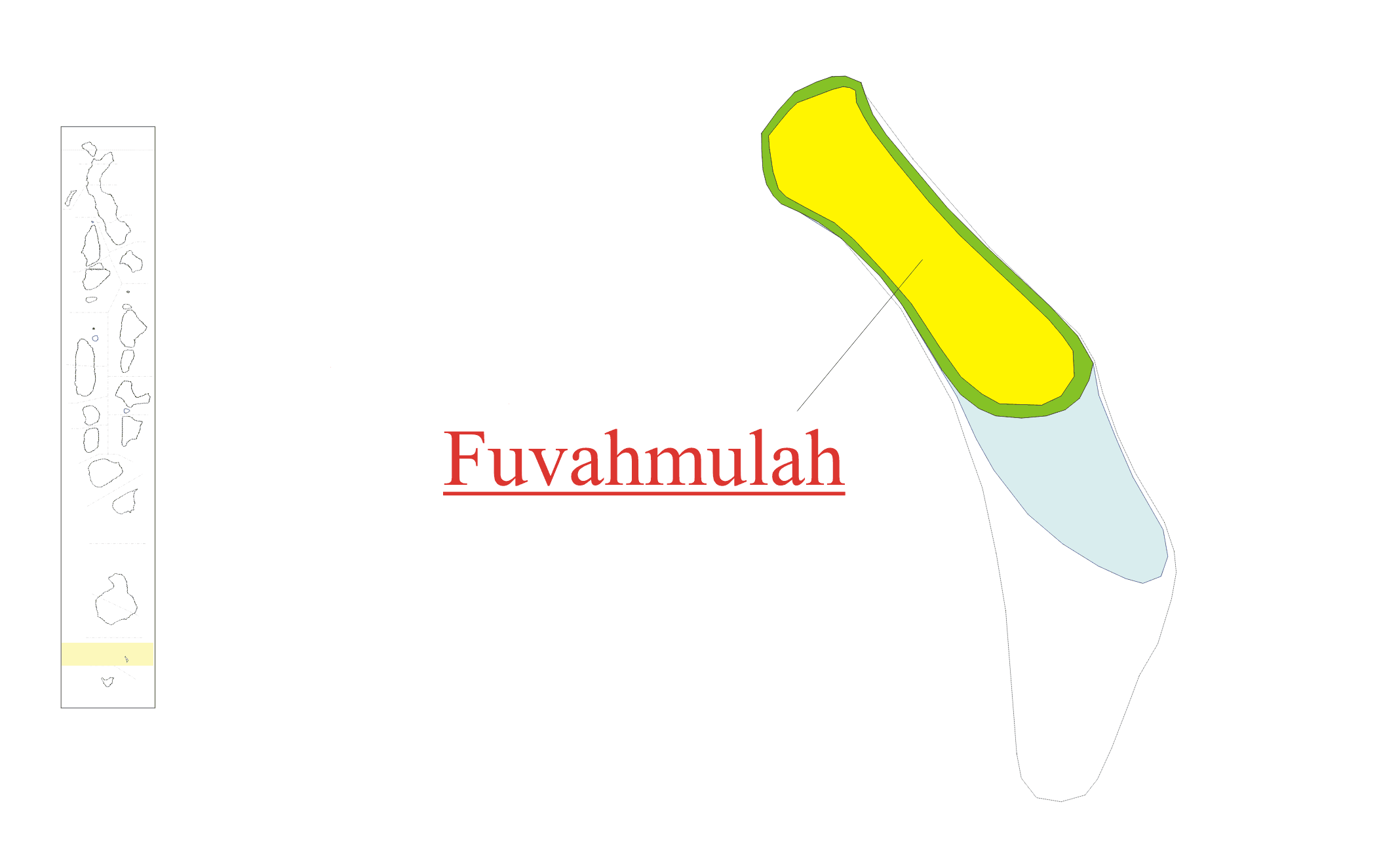

- Country: Maldives
- Corresponding geographic atoll(s): Fuvahmulah
- Location: 0° 15' S and 0° 20' S
- Capital: Fuvahmulah

Government
  - City Mayor: Ismail Rape (MDP)

Population (2022)
  - Total: 9,166
- Letter code: Gn
- Dhivehi letter code: Gn (ޏ)
  - Number of islands: 1
  - Inhabited islands: Fuvahmulah
- Resort islands(*), airports(¤) and industrial islands are also considered uninhabited.

Gnaviyani Atoll (Dhivehi: ޏ. އަތޮޅު, pronounced [ɳaʋijan̪i at̪oɭu], Nyaviyani) is one of the administrative divisions of the Maldives corresponding to the natural atoll Fuvahmulah. Surfacewise, it is the smallest administrative unit in the Maldives, situated on the Equatorial Channel (Addu - Mulah Kandu) between Huvadhu Atoll and Addu Atoll.

== Geography ==
The atoll of Fuvahmulah corresponding to this administrative division is the 25th natural atoll of the Maldives. In the distant past, Fuvahmulah was a small coral atoll whose southern end was open at a spot called Diyarehifaando, and the inside of the island was a saltwater lagoon forming a natural harbour. There is a spot in the southern end known as a Kudhuheraivali (the forest of the small islet), which indicates that there was a separate small island in that area in ancient times. Later the channel connecting the lagoon with the ocean was closed by massive coral boulders. Thus the inside of the island is lower than its edges. In time the inner lagoon lost its saltiness, and all that remains today are two small lakes (Kulhi), wetlands and marshy taro fields. Therefore, Fuvahmulah is a small atoll that closed and filled in with silt, like Nukutavake in the Central Pacific.

== Municipal Divisions ==
Fuvahmulah was traditionally divided into nine wards. From north to south these wards were Dhadimago and Diguvāndo (both stretching from east to west shore), Hōdhado and Dhashokubaa (both segmental), separated by Mādhado (a diagonal strip of parallel width); whilst the other four divisions, which occupied the southern part of the island, consisted of two eastern and western strips bisected into four wards: Mālegan and Dūndigan lying to the east and Miskimmago and Funādo to the west.

The largest division among all is Dhadimago. Over time, changes occurred. The number of wards was reduced to eight, since the village of Dhashokubaa was merged with Miskimmago. Moreover, extension of some wards with time, brought its way into certain changes in area such as that of Hōdhado. The northerly extension of the ward led to the land from eastern strip of Diguvāndo and some parts of that of Dhadimago being claimed to the village. It was mainly the land consisting of agricultural fields and plantations to vegetation owned by the villagers of Dhadimago and Diguvāndo.

Administratively these divisions act as the replacement for islands in other atolls. For each ward a chief (“Katheeb”) was appointed as in charge of the day-to-day affairs of the respective ward and held accountable for an Island chief. With the introduction of local government policy in the Maldives, an Island Council is to be elected for each ward of the island according to the Decentralisation act 2010. Also, an Atoll Council is to be elected for the atoll as a whole.

NOTE: Haa Alifu, Haa Dhaalu, Shaviyani, Noonu, Raa, Baa, Kaafu, etc.. (including Gnaviyani) are code letters assigned to the present administrative divisions of the Maldives. They are not the proper names of the natural atolls that make up these divisions. Some atolls are divided into two administrative divisions or contain half of an atoll (In case of Thiladhunmathi to Haa Alif, Haa Dhaal, Shaviyani and Noonu Atolls, Huvadhu Atoll to Gaafu Alifu and Gaafu Dhaalu Atolls and In case of half of Ari Atoll to Alifu Dhaalu Atoll), while other divisions are made up of two or more natural atolls (In case of Raa, Baa, Kaafu, Alifu Alifu and Vaavu Atolls). Some administrative divisions correspond to the same natural atoll too (In case of Lhaviyani, Meemu, Faafu, Dhaalu, Thaa, Laamu, Gnaviyani and Seenu Atolls). The order followed by the code letters are from North to South, beginning with the first letters of the Thaana alphabet used in Dhivehi. These code letters may not be accurate from the geographical and cultural point of view. However, they have become popular among tourists and foreigners in the Maldives who find them easier to pronounce than the true atoll names in Dhivehi, (save a few exceptions, like Ari Atoll).

Aware of the extent of this problem, Maldivian expert Mr. Ibrahim Luthfee wrote a book on Maldivian geography before he died. With this book, which is unfortunately available only in Dhivehi, the late Mr. Luthfee tried to clear a number of misconceptions that carelessly researched tourist publications have generalized even among Maldivians. Much of this article has been translated and adapted from his posthumous work.
