= Fua Mulaku Havitta =

Buddhist remains in Fuvahmulah, Maldives

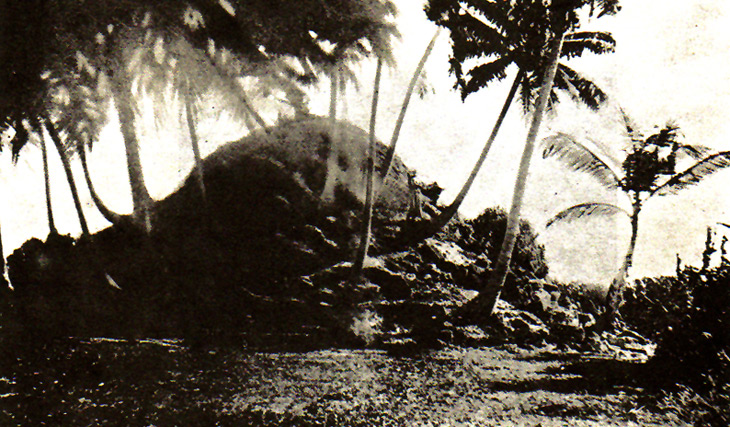
- The Fua Mulaku Havitta, by H.C.P. Bell, in 1922.
- Interactive map of Fua Mulaku Havitta
- Location: Fuvahmulah, Maldives
- Height: 40ft (1922)
- Governing body: Fuvahmulah City Council

Fua Mulaku Havitta (formerly Dhadimagi Havitta) is the ruin of a Buddhist chaitya whose main feature is its ruined stupa. The Havitta is located at the northeastern end of Fuvahmulah, Maldives. It was historically located in Dhadimagu ward of the island, in an area which has now been annexed to Hoadhadu ward. Being the most important center of the Buddhist community in the pre-Islamic period, Dhadimagu was the last ward of the island to have accepted Islam. It was after the acceptance of Islam by the residents of Dhadimagu ward that the Havitta was buried under a mound of sand and one of the temples in the area was converted into a mosque to be known as Gemmiskiy. This happened in the early 1200s under the leadership of Abu Bakr Naib, who completed the conversion process in Fuvahmulah started by his great grandfather Yoosuf Naib in the year 1145 CE.

In 1922, when H.C.P. Bell saw the ruin, the big Havitta was of about 40 feet in height. A smaller mound, about 15 feet in height, was located nearby. In 1982, their shapes had already been lost because of the damage done by careless diggings to find valuable artifacts or for bungled research purposes, which according to islanders' reports had been made in the 1940s.

Until the late 18th century, the residents of Dhadimagu used to live in the proximity of Havitta and surrounding areas. From then onwards, the area started to be used primarily for farming and plantation while the people chose to live only in the southern areas of the ward. Names of the houses which were there in the Havitta area, the families who lived in those houses and plantations of those families in the area, which were passed down from generation to generation can still be traced from related documents and genealogical writings. Apart from that, it can be established from the local oral traditions and the writings of H.C.P Bell, Luthfee and other historians that the Havitta area is historically located in Dhadimagu ward.

Starting from the 1990s, the Havitta area up to "Gemmiskiy Fannu" started to be claimed by the then leaders of Hoadhadu ward which became a popular stance among residents of the ward too. This was partly due to the inhabitance of the neighbouring areas by the residents of Hoadhadu as a result of the increase in population and subsequent northerly extension of the ward towards the end of the 20th century. Also, there were other factors like politics, the historical and geographical significance of the area and the important sights it hosts, which contributed to their claim. No historically valid arguments are there for the claim even if it has gained momentum due to political and other factors. There had been no formal decision regarding any changes to the border till 2019, which resulted in area claims of different views out of traditional boundaries.

In 2019, the Eastern half of the disputed area (to the East of Ulaa preschool) was officially merged with Hoadhadu, while the remaining half to the West (including Thoondu) remained as Dhadimagu territory. Even if formal changes have been made, due to the prolonged nature of this matter for decades without any official decision once the dispute started, conflicting views still exist among the people. Some people still hold their own version of beliefs without any historical evidence, while some others still look for ways to defend the traditional boundaries. Some people from Hoadhadu still lay claim to Gemmiskiy and Thoondu as well. Some people from Dhadimagu say that even if the houses in close proximity built by settlers from Hoadhadu were registered for Hoadhadu ward due to geopolitical reasons, the areas to the North of Havitta and most of the disputed areas still remain uninhabited and consist of farmlands (known popularly as "Dhadimagi Dhadomathi" or Dhadimagu farmlands) and woods all the way up to Thoondu, which along with the Havitta should still be considered as Dhadimagu areas due to their historical connection with the ward.

Apart from the reliable sources and historians, official authorities like Fuvahmulah City Council also identify the Havitta historically with Dhadimagu ward.

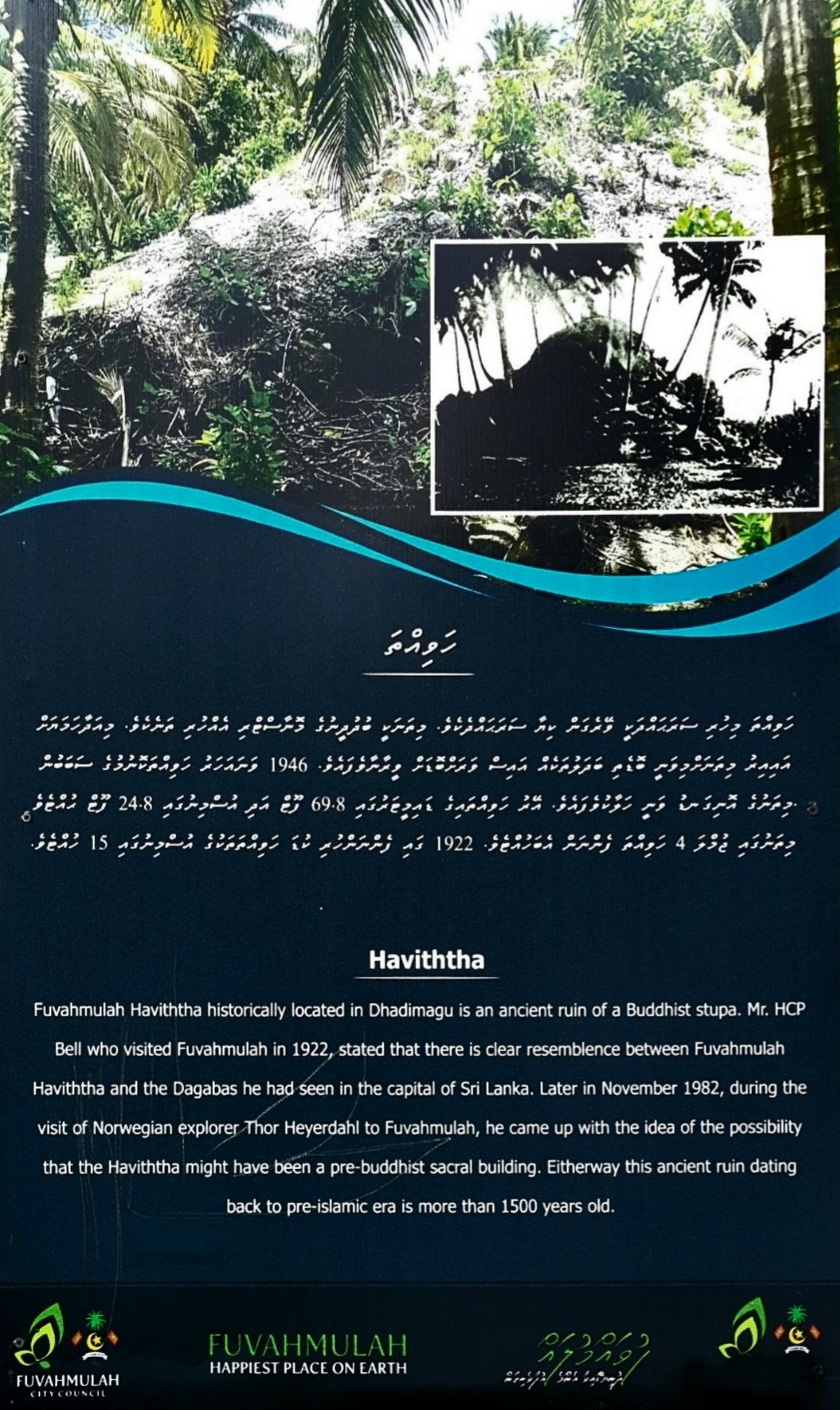
Information board put near the Havitta by Fuvahmulah City Council.

== Explorers ==
In 1922 H. C. P. Bell, who had already visited the Maldives in 1879 and 1920 returned to the islands for a last time with the specific objective of establishing, once for all, whether Buddhism had indeed been the faith of the islanders before their conversion to Islam in ca. 1153 A.D. In February 1922, he travelled to Fuvahmulah and briefly examined the remains of the Havitta. However, he stayed on the island for just half a day, not doing excavations. Bell's extensive reports on the 1922 expedition, published in 1922-35 in the Journals of Royal Asiatic Society, and, as a book, posthumously in 1940, link the pre-Islamic Buddhist structures of the Maldives such as the Havitta with those of neighboring Sri Lanka. It was this Havitta, for which Bell was much struck by the close resemblance between it and the dagabas he had previously seen at Anuradhapura. Bell's expeditions remain to be the only professional archaeological excavations ever conducted in the Maldivian Archipelago. As a part of these excavations Bell travelled to some other islands too.

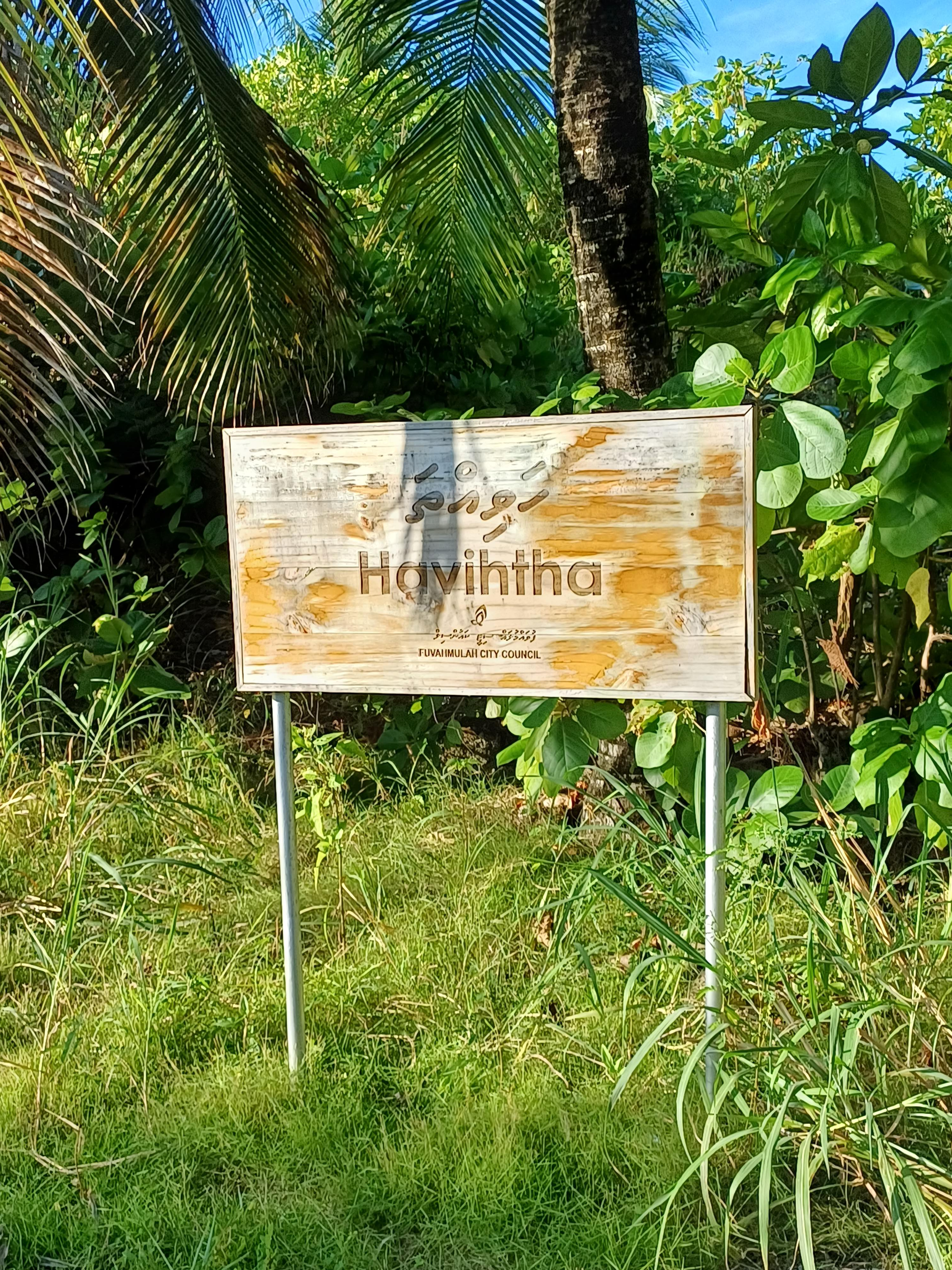
Sign near Havitta

Norwegian Thor Heyerdahl also visited this Havitta (in November 1982), but was not allowed to do excavation work; the site had already been ruined by non-professional digging after Bell's visit. Heyerdahl and his comrades, however found stone parts which had fallen down from former fillings which convinced him that on this same place, there must also have been a pre-buddhist sacral building. They also discovered two more, but much smaller, mounds nearby. The smallest one seemed to have been unknown to the islanders in 1982.

== See also ==
- Kuruhinna Tharaagandu
