= Maadhadu =

Administrative division of Fuvahmulah, Maldives

Maadhadu is an administrative division of Fuvahmulah, Maldives. With the changes it has encountered over time, this is today the smallest district in Fuvahmulah. Located in the center of the island the district shares borders with Diguvāndo, Hōdhado, Mālegan and Miskimmago.

== Economy ==
Most residents of Mādhado rely heavily on white collar jobs for income as this district houses the strategically most important buildings in the island, including the Secretariat of the Atoll Council, Secretariat of the Island Councils, Fuvahmulaku Court, Youth Centre, State Trading Organization Shopping Centre, Wataniya, Bank of Maldives, Fuvahmulaku Branch and other important government buildings including the MNDF establishment in Fuvahmulah, Maldives Police Service building and the Dhiraagu Operations Center, Fuvahmulah.

== Places of interest ==
- The Dhiraagu communications antenna: The tallest structure in the Maldives, along with the Wathaniya communications antenna in the island. Both structures stand 400 feet tall.
- Kedeyre Miskiy: An old historical mosque in Fuvahmulah.
- Ufuraajehi Miskiy: One of 4 the oldest mosques in Fuvahmulah built during the earliest days of Islam in the island.
- Secretariat of the Atoll Council: The highest administrative unit of the atoll as a whole. Headquarters of the Atoll Council.
- Secretariat of the Island Councils: The headquarters of the Councillors elected for the 8 wards of the island.
- Gn. Atoll Education Center: The only Secondary as well as Higher Secondary School in Fuvahmulah. (shared with Miskiymagu)
- Gn. Atoll Hospital (shared with Miskiymagu)
- Atoll Football Ground (shared with Miskiymagu)
- Sports Park
- Dhiraagu Operations Center, Fuvahmulah
- Wataniya Fuvahmulaku Branch
- State Trading Organisation Fuvahmulaku Branch
- Bank of Maldives Fuvahmulaku Branch
- MNDF establishment in Fuvahmulah
- Fuvahmulaku Court
- Fuvahmulaku Police Station
- Fuvahmulaku Media Center
- Fuvahmulaku Youth Center
- Fuvahmulaku Social Center
- Fuvahmulaku Family & Children Service Centre

== Notable people ==
- Ibrahim Fikury Didi (Karayye Kalhuthutthu Didi): Famous poet and scholar.
- Mohamed Ibrahim Didi (Modi): Former MP of Fuvahmulah and also former Maldivian Deputy High Commissioner to Singapore.
- Shifaq Mufeed (Histo): Former Member of Parliament for the Fuvahmulah Central Constituency consisting of Maadhadu, Miskiymagu and Maalegan wards.
- Athiya Naseer: Former Principal of Aminiya School.
- Ibrahim Faamuladeyri Kilegefan: Son of Sultan Muhammed Ghiya'as ud-din. His descendants are many in Fuvahmulah.
- Mulaku Mohamed Manikfan: Son of Sultan Ibrahim Mudzhiruddine of Isdhoo dynasty. His descendants too live in Fuvahmulah.
- Dhaigandu Maafaiy Thakurufan: Father of Sultan Ali V and grandfather of Sultan Ibrahim Mudzhiruddine of Isdhoo dynasty.
- Edhuru Hassan Naib Ranahamaadhi Thakurufan: Father of Qazi Mohamed Shamsuddin.
- Dhaigandu Dhon Isa Khatib Thakurufan: Grandfather of Sultan Ali V and great-grandfather of Sultan Ibrahim Mudzhiruddine of Isdhoo dynasty.
- Dhorubaigedharu Fehelaandaa Muhammad Al-Misri: Grandfather of Qazi Mohamed Shamsuddin. Originally from Egypt.
- Dhorubaigedharu Beefaan: Grandmother of Qazi Mohamed Shamsuddin.
- Edhuruge' Aisha Didi (Dhoshee Didi): Daughter of Ibrahim Faamuladeyri Kilegefan and Kudairani Edhurugey Maryam Manikfan of Fuvahmulah. Her descendants live in both Addu and Huvadhu Atolls and it is from her that the branches of Dhiyamigili dynasty in Addu and Huvadhu Atolls originated.
- Dhaigandu Ganduvaru Moosa Manikfan: Son of Mulaku Mohamed Manikfan. Father of Dhaigandu Ganduvaru Mohamed Manikfan and Kondey Ali Manikfan who is the origin of the branches of Isdhoo dynasty in Addu and Huvadhu Atolls except for the branch of the descendants of Sultan Hasan X of Isdhoo dynasty.
- Dhaigandu Ganduvaru Mohamed Manikfan: Son of Dhaigandu Ganduvaru Moosa Manikfan. Father of Chief Justice Moosa Muhyiddin according to some researchers.
