= Mulah Kandu =

Mulah Kandu, Dv. for "Mulah Channel", is the channel between Fuvahmulah and Addu Atoll.

Addu Kandu and Mulah Kandu are geographically one channel. But because Fuvahmulah lies north-east of Addu Atoll, the part of the channel in between Fuvahmulah and Addu Atoll is considered as Mulah Kandu by geographers. The part of the channel in between Huvadhu Atoll and Addu Atoll with no barrier in between is considered as Addu Kandu. Both the channel divisions together are known as the Equatorial Channel because the Equator lies between Huvadhu Atoll and Fuvahmulah.

Mulah Kandu is one of the deepest and roughest channel in the Maldives. The island of Fuvahmulah lies in this channel and the channel continues to the eastern tip of Addu Atoll Meedhoo Koagannu Faru.

Fuvahmulah in the Mulah Kandu is the first atoll of Maldives in the Southern Hemisphere and the nearest atoll to the Equator. Being so close to the Equator makes Mulah Kandu among the roughest channels in Maldives due to the high pressure winds evolving in the Equator. As a result, Fuvahmulah was often inaccessible to seafarers and travelers in the past.

== Etymology of the name Mulah Kandu ==
The name Mulah was derived from Mulah the original name of Fuvahmulah. Kandu in Dhivehi means channel.
