= Dhoondigan =

Administrative division of Fuvahmulah, Maldives

Dhoondigan is an administrative division of Fuvahmulah, Maldives. It is the most populous district and the second largest by area. This ward lies in the Southeastern corner of the island sharing borders with Mālegan and Funaadu.

== Economy ==
The harbour and airport of Fuvahmulah is located in Dhoondigan. It also has a large marsh land area shared with Funaadu and Maalegan. In addition to that it also had a large area with many coconut trees and vegetation which was cleared to construct the airport in Fuvahmulah. In the past there was a large agricultural area which produced enough water melons and other crops which too have been replaced by the airport.

== Places of interest ==
- Unakede Miskiy: An old historical mosque.
- Vashoveyo: An ancient circular bath with stone steps. This stone pool reveals great craftsmanship in the cutting of Porites coral stone (hirigal) by the locals.
- "Bilihifeyshe neru": One of the famous anchorages (traditional harbours) of Fuvahmulah.
- "Kalho akiri gando": A unique location of black pebbles which can be found in the beach areas of Dhoondigan and Funaadu.
- Fuvahmulaku School: One of the four primary schools in Fuvahmulah.
- Fuvahmulaku Harbor: The harbor of Fuvahmulah.
- Fuvahmulaku Airport: Airport of Fuvahmulah is situated in the areas of Dhoondigan and Funaadu.

== Notables ==
- Dr. Mohamed Jameel Ahmed: former Vice President of the Maldives.
- Mr. Mohamed Maleeh Jamal: former Minister of Youth and Sports of the Maldives.

== Notables from history ==
- Al-Hafiz Ahmed Edhurukaleygefaan (Dhoondigamu Edhurukaleygefan): One of the most famous Islamic Scholars in the country during his time. A student of Vaadhoo Dhannakaleygefaan.
- Fathimath Manikfan: Wife of Ibrahim Faamuladeyri Kilegefan, son of Sultan Muhammed Ghiya'as ud-din of the Maldives.
- Dhoon'digamu Maryam Didi: Daughter of Ibrahim Faamuladeyri Kilegefan, son of Sultan Muhammed Ghiya'as ud-din of the Maldives.
- Dhoon'digamu Ismail Didi: Son of Ibrahim Faamuladeyri Kilegefan, son of Sultan Muhammed Ghiya'as ud-din of the Maldives.
- Bahaboakaleyge Ahmad Kaleyge: Father of Fathimath Manikfan, the wife of Ibrahim Faamuladeyri Kilegefan.
- Dhoon'digamu Haji Kaleyge Ahmed Kaleyge Aminah Manike
