= Ahmed Jamsheed Mohamed =

WHO Representative to North Korea and Bangladesh

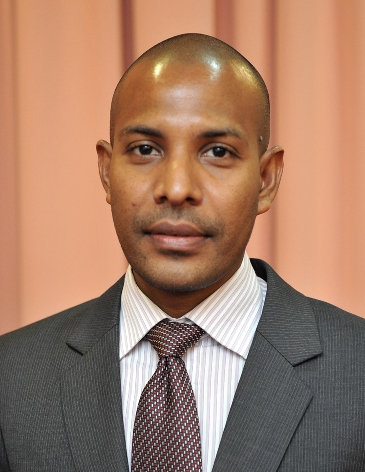
- Portrait, 2012

WHO Representative to Bangladesh
- Incumbent
- Assumed office 1 November 2024

WHO Representative to North Korea
- Incumbent
- Assumed office 3 August 2022

Minister of Health
- In office 7 May 2012 – 31 October 2013
- President: Mohamed Waheed Hassan
- Preceded by: Himself
- Succeeded by: Aamal Ali (acting)

Minister of Health and Family
- In office 7 February 2012 – 7 May 2012
- President: Mohamed Waheed Hassan
- Preceded by: Aminath Jameel
- Succeeded by: Himself

Personal details
- Born: 29 April 1972 (age 54) Miskiymagu, Fuvahmulah, Maldives
- Education: Indira Gandhi Government Medical College, Nagpur; London School of Hygiene & Tropical Medicine

Ahmed Jamsheed Mohamed (born 29 April 1972) is a Maldivian public health expert who is currently serving as the WHO Representative to the North Korea and Bangladesh since 2022 and 2024 respectively. Mohamed also previously served as the Minister of Health from 2012 to 2013.

== Early life and education ==
Mohamed was born in Fuvahmulah. He has an MBBS degree from Indira Gandhi Government Medical College, Nagpur, and a master's degree in public health from the London School of Hygiene & Tropical Medicine.

== Career ==
Mohamed was the previous Director General at the Centre for Community Health and Disease Control, later became the chief operating officer of ADK Hospital until his resignation.

Mohamed was appointed to Minister of Health during the presidency of Mohamed Waheed Hassan, he was the Minister of Health until his resignation in 2013.

Mohamed later became the WHO Representative to North Korea in August 2022, and the WHO representative to Bangladesh in November 2024.
