= Gnaviyani =

Gnaviyani (sometimes spelt Nyaviyani) can refer to:

- Gnaviyani Atoll, an administrative division of the Maldives.
- Gnaviyani ( ޏ ), the 16th consonant of the Thaana alphabet used in Dhivehi. It is located between letters Gaafu and Seenu.
