= Addu Kandu =

Coordinates: 0°10′00″N 73°00′00″E

Addu Kandu, Dv. for "Addu Channel", is the traditional name of the broad channel between Huvadhu Atoll and Addu Atoll in the south of Maldives.

In the British Admiralty charts it is called Equatorial Channel because the Equator passes through its midst.

Within Addu Kandu the Equatorial Channel divides to form another important channel named Mulah Kandu. Geographically a part of Addu Kandu, it is located north-east of Addu Atoll, between the eastern end of this atoll and Fuvahmulah at a lat of 0° 17' S, southwards from the centre of the main channel.

This channel appeared in old French maps with the name Courant de Addoue.

== See also ==
- Mulah Kandu

== Bibliography ==
- Divehiraajjege Jōgrafīge Vanavaru. Muhammadu Ibrahim Lutfee. G.Sōsanī.
- Xavier Romero-Frias, The Maldive Islanders, A Study of the Popular Culture of an Ancient Ocean Kingdom. 1999
