= Havitta =

Name for ancient Buddhist stupas in the Maldives

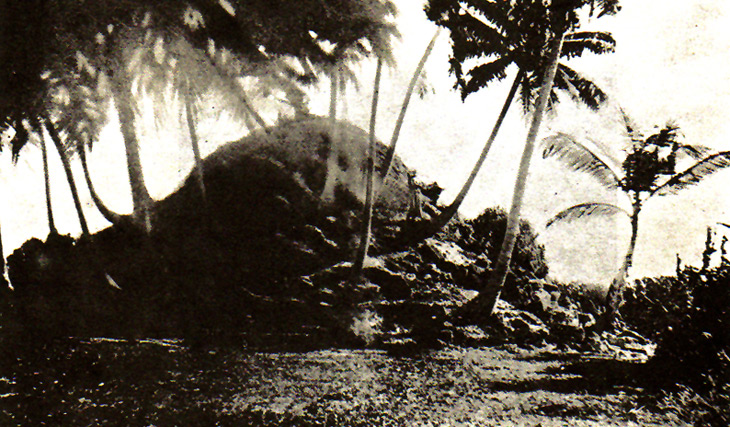

Havitta is a name used to refer the ancient Buddhist stupas in Maldives. The word haviita is believed to have some affinities with the Sanskrit word caitya, used to refer Buddhist sacred places. Some of the famous Havittas in Maldives include Fua Mulaku Havitta and Vādū Havitta.
