= Ali Rafeeq =

Maldivian journalist

Ali Rafeeq was the Editor in Chief of Haveeru Daily and Haveeru Online in the Maldives. After serving the position for 23 years, in 2010 he shifted to New Zealand. A native of Fuvahmulah, Maldives, Rafeeq is the first Maldivian to acquire a PhD from Journalism. He acquired the PhD from the University of Canterbury in New Zealand. He acquired his master's degree from the same University in 2003 and was chosen among the top students, winning a scholarship for his PhD. Rafeeq acquired his bachelor's degree in journalism from the International Islamic University Malaysia. He is also the founder of Haveeru Online.

In the year 1997, Rafeeq was awarded the National Award of Excellence for outstanding service in the field of journalism by the Government of the Republic of Maldives.
