= Hoadhadu =

Administrative division of Fuvahmulah, Maldives

Hoadhadu is an administrative division of Fuvahmulah, Maldives. The district shares borders with Dhadimagu, Dhiguvaandu and Maadhadu. Hoadhadu has been the smallest district in Fuvahmulah throughout history. During the late 20th century, the increase in population of the district led to pressure on land in the neighbouring areas. This led to a northern extension of the village, resulting in land from Dhadimagu and Dhiguvaandu wards being claimed to the village. Though this has resulted in a change of the believed-to-be areas in a disputed state, no formal changes have been made and area claims of different views exist.

== History ==
Hoadhadu is the first district in Fuvahmulah to have accepted Islam. The smaller size of the village with fewer people during the time of conversion may be the main reason for the village being the first district to be converted. What is clear from historical sources is that smaller districts of Fuvahmulah converted first and the larger districts last. After Hoadhadu it was Maadhadu, Maalegan, Miskiymagu and Dhashukubaa (the remaining smallest villages back then) which were converted. The larger ones, Dhadimagu, Dhoondigan, Funaadu and Dhiguvaandu are the last villages to have converted.

== Economy ==
Historically, many residents of Hoadhadu depended on fishing as the primary source of income, although today retail business along with white collar jobs have diminished the dependency on fishing. One of the traditional harbours of Fuvammulah "Anbule Athiri" is located within Hoadhadu which explains the district's dependency on fishing.

== Places of interest ==
- Former Naaibu Aboobakuru School: Was one of the four primary schools in Fuvahmulah till 2012 when it was merged with the other primary schools in the island. On the site of the school, there are government plans to open a junior college or a polytechnics institution.
- Anbule Athiri: One of the traditional harbours of Fuvahmulah.
- Hanihari (Heniari) Miskiy: The first mosque to be built in Fuvahmulah. It was demolished in the 1950s and now only the ruins of its foundation is there.
- Hoadhadu Miskiy: The second mosque to be built in Fuvahmulah.
- Kilhiemagi Miskiy: A mosque which is more than 100 years old.
- Seedhi Miskiy: Another mosque which is more than 100 years old.
- Hoadhadige: The house where the Yoosuf Naaibu family (who introduced Islam to the island) lived.
