= Bandaara Kilhi =

Fresh water lake in Fuvahmulah, Maldives

Bandaara Kilhi (literally "State Lake") is one of the two fresh water lakes in Fuvahmulah, Maldives.

The lake covers about 0.058 square kilometres (14 acres) and averages 15 feet deep, which makes it the largest lake by volume in the Maldives accommodating the largest freshwater reserve in the country. Bounded by dense vegetations of mainly ferns, Screwpine, tropical almond, cheese fruit, Banana trees, coconut palms, taro fields, and a few mango trees. Among local riparian creatures are the common moorhen, exclusively found in Fuvahmulah nationally and Maldivian white-breasted waterhen (Amaurornis phoenicurus maldivus), which is an endemic species of the Maldives.

Most of the lake is in Maalegan ward, the rest is in Miskiymagu.

Today fish from the lake are not used for eating. Unlike, Dhadimagi Kilhi in the north of the island, Bandaara Kilhi is not used by the locals for swimming due to the depth and muddy shorelines.

To complement Fuvahmulah Harbour's opening in 2003, the lake's jetty and observation deck was built. Since 2011 two huts and a restaurant in Maldivian cultural style with the roofs thatched with coconut palm leaves have stood on the shores. A custom is feeding the tilapia and variety of creatures which inhabit the lake from local small craft.

Bandaara Kilhi is a protected area of Fuvahmulah since 12 June 2012, nationally, and by the local atoll council since five months before.
