= Dhadimagi Kilhi =

Fresh water lake in Fuvahmulah, Maldives

Dhadimagi Kilhi (literally "Dhadimagu Lake") is one of the two fresh water lakes in Fuvahmulah, Maldives.

== Description ==
Located in Dhadimagu ward of the island, with an area of 6.37 hectares and an average depth of 4 feet, it is the second-largest lake by volume in the Maldives, and larger in area than its counterpart Bandaara Kilhi, which is the largest lake by volume in the country. Bounded by dense vegetation of different kinds ranging from ferns to reeds used for weaving mats, taro fields and plant varieties such as Syzygium cumini (jambul), pond-apple, mango, pineapple, screwpine, tropical almond, cheese fruit, ambarella and banana fields as well, there is the continuation of a large marsh land area towards the south of the island associated with the lake.

== Ecology ==
In the past, fish were farmed and harvested in the lake. Dhadimagi Kilhi is frequented by anglers who game for tilapia fish and visitors who enjoy boat riding and feeding the fish which inhabit the lake. Among the birds which inhabit the place apart from the common moorhen which is a bird exclusively found in Fuvahmulah only in the Maldivian archipelago, Maldivian white-breasted waterhen (Amaurornis phoenicurus maldivus) which is an endemic species of the Maldives too can be sighted by the lakeside. Among seasonal visitors are flamingos, herons and white terns.

Dhadimagi Kilhi is the most popular for swimming among all fresh water lakes in the Maldives. The lake has been used by the locals to teach young children how to swim, since the lake is calm and there are no waves, unlike the sea which surrounds the island. The rich mineral water and mud in the lake has been used for medicinal purposes. Even though the locals do not use water from the lake for drinking, laboratory tests have shown that the water in Dhadimagi Kilhi is not unsafe for drinking.

== Environmental protection ==
Dhadimagi Kilhi was declared as a protected area of Fuvahmulah by the government of Maldives on 12 June 2012 and the Atoll Council of Fuvahmulah also passed a decree to establish the place as a protected area on 19 January 2012.
