= Ibrahim Rafeeq =

Minister of Housing and Urban Development
- In office July 2005 – August 2008
- President: Maumoon Abdul Gayoom

Personal details
- Born: Fuvahmulah, Maldives

Ibrahim Rafeeq is a Maldivian politician who served as the Minister of Housing and Urban Development of the Maldives from 2005 to 2008. A native of Fuvahmulah, Rafeeq is the managing director of the Rainbow group consisting of Rainbow Enterprises Pvt. Ltd., Rainbow Construction Pvt. Ltd. and Rainland Developers Pvt. Ltd. in the Maldives.
