= Gen Mosque =

Sunni mosque in Fuvahmulah, Maldives

- ގެން މިސްކިތް
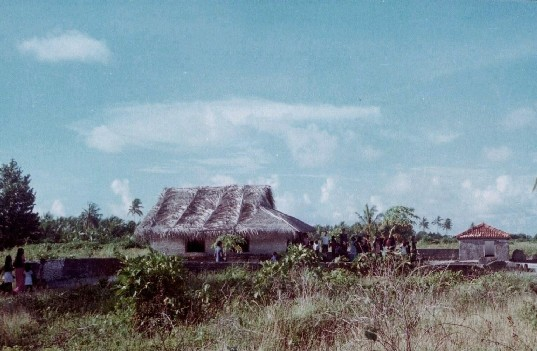
- Gen Mosque in 1984

- Location of the mosque in the Maldives

Religion
- Affiliation: Sunni Islam
- Sect: Sufism
- Ecclesiastical or organizational status: Mosque
- Status: Active

Location
- Location: Dhadimagu, Fuvahmulah, Gnaviyani Atoll
- Country: Maldives
- Interactive map of Gen Mosque
- Coordinates: 0°17′54.1″S 73°25′37.1″E

Architecture
- Style: Traditional Maldivian architecture
- Established: c. 1300
- Materials: Stone; sandstone

The Gen Mosque (Note: alternatively spelled as Gemmiskiy and Gen Miskit.) (Dhivehi: ގެން މިސްކިތް) is a Sunni Islam mosque, located in the district of Dhadimagu, in Fuvahmulah, on the Gnaviyani Atoll, in the Maldives. Built in c. 1300 and before 1378, it is one of the oldest mosques in the Maldives. The mosque is made of coral stone and was built straight after the conversion to Islam. The mosque is not facing towards the Qibla.

== Overview ==
The Gen Miskit is located in the district of Dhadimagu at the northern end of Fuvahmulah. It's now a revered site for its historical significance to the island. It's the first mosque that the residents of the island did their Friday prayer and Eid prayers.

There are disputes whether Gemmiskiy is the oldest mosque in the Maldives and in Fuvahmulah, media reports and residents say that it is the oldest. However, in a monograph written by H.C.P. Bell, Fuvahmulah had four mosques prior to Gen Miskit. It is really uncertain.

There has been some concern about the extinction of the mosque due to lack of maintenance by the Fuvahmulah City Council.

== Features ==
The mosque has a communal well, a rectangular ancient circular bath known as ‘Genmiskiy Veyo’ and a cemetery with enclosed shrines “ziyaarat” of revered religious figures.

=== Shrine ===
A place constructed with sandstone and protected by bricks. It is also said that the person who built the mosque, Addu's Meedhoo Abu Bakr Naib Kaleygefaanu, is buried at and Ah Naib Al-Hafiz Abubakr, potentially the first proselytizer of Islam in the island.

=== Veu ===
Gemmiskiy Veu or Veyo is a rectangular bath that is adjacent to the Southeastern wall of the mosque that has waters going down into the waters. It shares similarities with the baths in monasteries in Pokna and Anuradhapura in Sri Lanka.

=== Well ===
The well is crafted from sandstones and has unique stories about it. It is said by the residents of the island that the water tastes really sweet and each corner of the well has a unique taste.

== Gallery ==
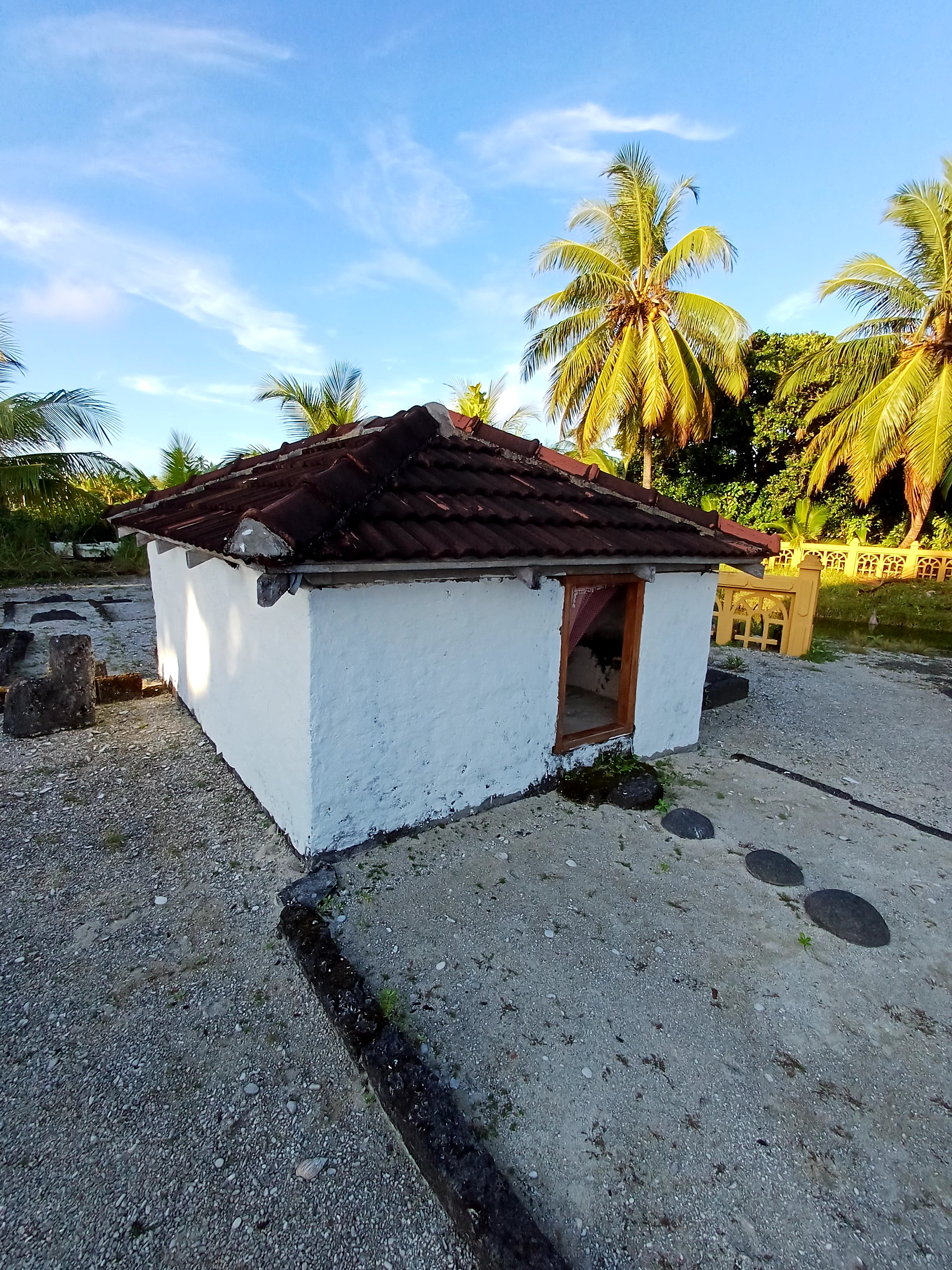
The shrine, at the mosque

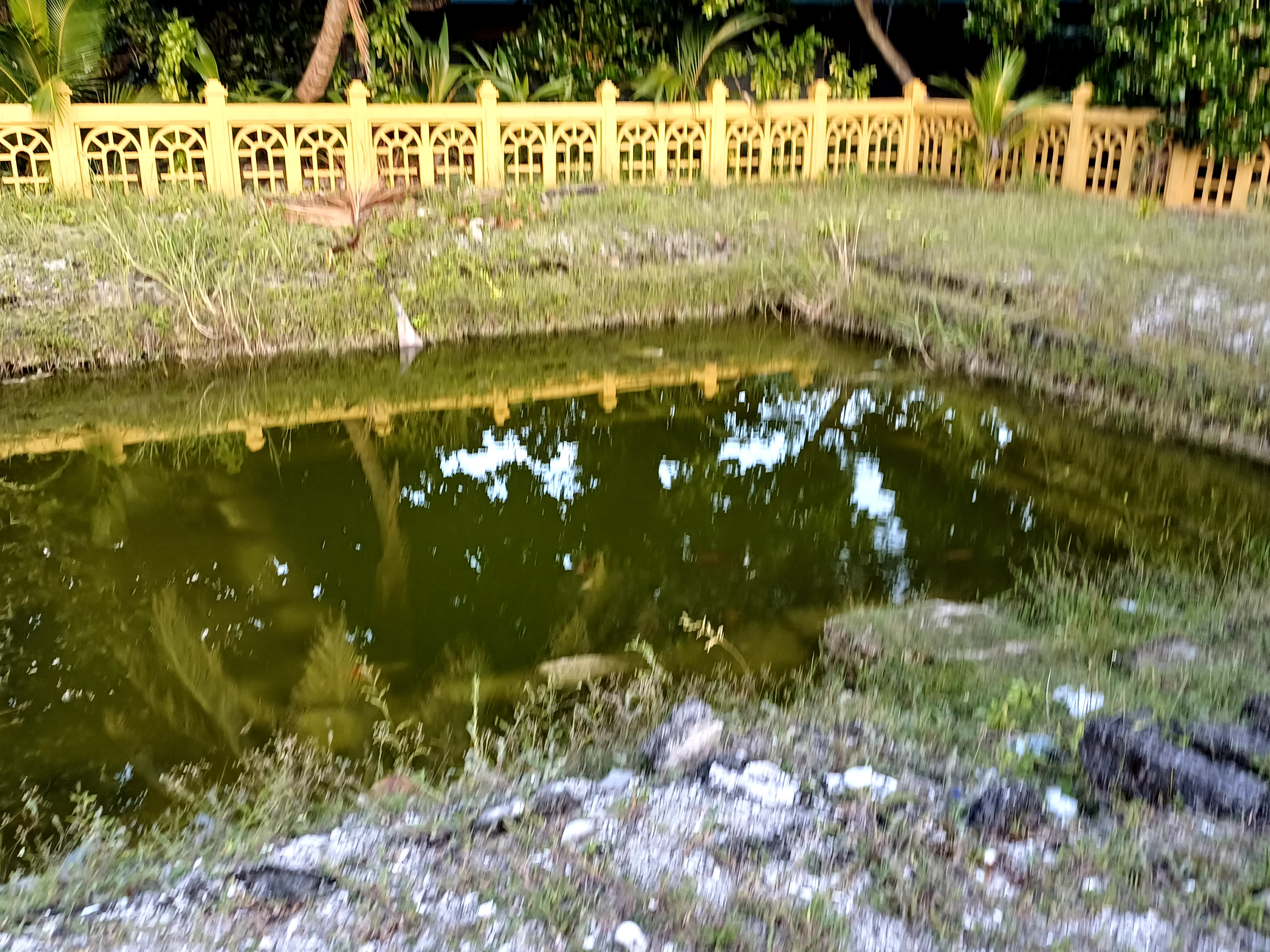
Veyo, at the mosque

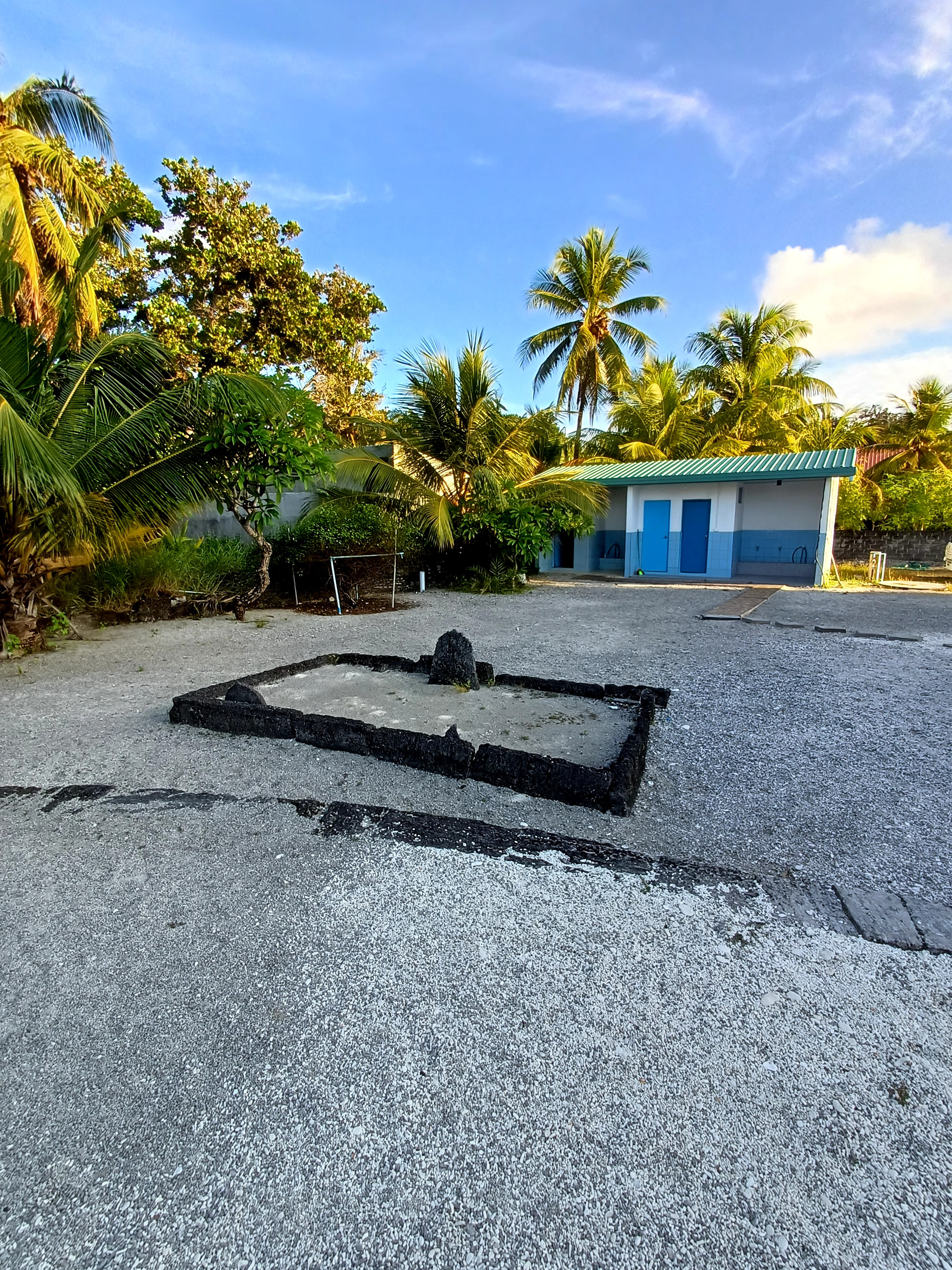
An unmarked grave, at the mosque

== See also ==
- Islam in the Maldives
- List of mosques in the Maldives
