= Indira Gandhi Government Medical College, Nagpur =

Indian government medical college

Indira Gandhi Government Medical College & Hospital
- इंदिरा गांधी शासकीय वैद्यकीय महाविद्यालय व रुग्णालय
- Motto: अहर्निश सेवामहे
- Motto in English: (we) work day and night in service (of people)
- Type: Medical education and research institution
- Established: 1968; 58 years ago
- Academic affiliations: Maharashtra University of Health Sciences
- Endowment: Government-funded
- Dean: Dr. Avinash Gawande
- Students: SAIGGMC (Student Association of IGGMC)
- Undergraduates: MBBS : 200 (per year)
- Postgraduates: MD : 60 (per year)
- Location: Nagpur, Maharashtra, 440018, India; 21°09′12″N 79°05′38″E
- Campus: Urban
- Nicknames: IGGMCH, Mayo Hospital
- Website: www.iggmc.org
- Location within Maharashtra Location within India

Indira Gandhi Government Medical College, Nagpur (IGGMC) is a public medical college located in Nagpur, Maharashtra, India. It was established in 1968. It is run by the Government of Maharashtra. It is one of the three government medical colleges in Nagpur city. The other government medical colleges in Nagpur are the Government Medical College, Nagpur, and All India Institute of Medical Sciences, Nagpur.

== History ==
Indira Gandhi Medical College & Hospital Nagpur was originally known as Mayo Hospital was established in the year 1905. In 1914 to further the cause of Medical Education the "Robertson Medical School" was opened. In 1967 "Corporation Medical College" was established, which was transferred to the Government in 1968 and was renamed as Indira Gandhi Medical College. Now it has an identity as "Indira Gandhi Government Medical College & Hospital". Year 2027 marks the diamond Jubilee of this institute, a historic milestone celebrated by various academic and non academic events by the institute in 2026-2027.

== Location ==
Indira Gandhi Government Medical College & Hospital (IGGMCH), commonly referred to as Mayo Hospital, is situated in Central Nagpur, Maharashtra, India. The institution is located on Central Avenue, close to the Nagpur Railway Station in the postal area 440018.

== Academics ==
Indira Gandhi Government Medical College & Hospital has National Medical Commission recognition for 200 MBBS admissions for the year 2019–2020. Postgraduate courses are available in the subjects like Anatomy, Physiology, Biochemistry, Pharmacology, Pathology, Microbiology, Forensic Medicine, Community Medicine, Ophthalmology, ENT, Orthopedics, Anesthesiology, Paediatrics, General Medicine, General Surgery, Obstetrics & Gynaecology, Radio-Diagnosis, Respiratory Medicine. The institute is also among the key centres providing MRI Scan in Nagpur, supporting both academic research and public healthcare services.

== Notable alumni ==
- Ahmed Jamsheed Mohamed, WHO representative to Bangladesh
