= Faisal Naseem =

Vice President of the Maldives from 2018 to 2023

- ފައިޞަލް ނަސީމް
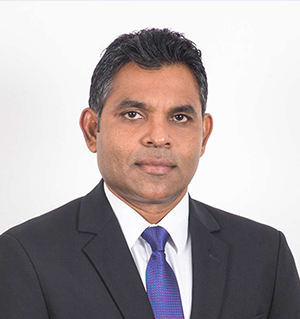
- Official portrait, 2018

12th Vice President of the Maldives
- In office 17 November 2018 – 17 November 2023
- President: Ibrahim Mohamed Solih
- Preceded by: Abdulla Jihad
- Succeeded by: Hussain Mohamed Latheef

Member of the 18th People's Majlis
- In office 28 May 2014 – 16 November 2018
- President: Abdulla Yameen
- Speaker: Abdulla Maseeh Mohamed; Qasim Ibrahim
- Preceded by: Abdulla Jabir
- Succeeded by: Abdulla Jabir
- Constituency: Kaashidhoo

Personal details
- Born: 20 July 1973 (age 52) Funaadu, Fuvahmulah, Maldives
- Party: Maldivian Democratic Party (2024–present)
- Other political affiliations: Jumhooree Party (2008–2024)
- Relations: Nazra Naseem (sister)
- Education: University of Birmingham (BA); Cardiff Metropolitan University (MBA)
- Occupation: Politician

Faisal Naseem (Dhivehi: ފައިޞަލް ނަސީމް; born 20 July 1973) is a Maldivian politician who served as the 12th vice president of the Maldives from 2018 to 2023. He was elected to office as the running mate of Ibrahim Mohamed Solih in the 2018 presidential election. Prior to his election, Naseem served for many years in the social sector, particularly in tourism.

As vice president, Naseem fulfilled the responsibilities of the president for 3 hours and 30 minutes on 25 February 2022 when the president underwent a medical procedure. He is the longest serving vice president in Maldivian history as of 2023.

== Early life ==
Faisal Naseem was born in the Funaadu district in Fuvahmulah on 20 July 1973. In 1986, at age 12, Naseem joined the social sector. Nadeem pursued tertiary education in the United Kingdom, receiving a bachelor's degree in Hospitality and Tourism Management from the University of Birmingham, and a master's degree in Business Administration from the Cardiff Metropolitan University.

== Career ==
Prior to studying in England, Naseem joined the hospitality industry, serving in positions ranging from assistant manager to general manager. He joined the hospitality industry to become better familiar with his field of choice, which is where he would spend the majority of his career. In recognition of his work, Naseem was awarded the National Youth Award in social services in 1999, and received a “Special Recognition” award in 2015. In 2014, he was named a Disability Ambassador.

Faisal Naseem is also a skilled craftsman, architect and interior designer. He has previously worked on the construction of various guesthouses, resorts and residences, and as of recent, the Millennium guest house in Fuvahmulah.

== Politics ==
Naseem entered the political field in 2004, becoming one of the members to represent the Fuvahmulah Constituency during the drafting of a new constitution from 2004 - 2008. After the constitution's successful completion, he stayed away from politics for the next 5 years. He rejoined the parliament again in 2014, serving as the MP for Kaashidhoo. On 13 July 2018, Naseem was chosen as Ibrahim Mohamed Solih's vice presidential candidate for the 2018 presidential election.

Naseem is the first vice president of the Maldives to complete a five year term.
