= Thoondu =

Beach in Fuvahmulah, Maldives

Coordinates: 0.277227°S 73.417609°E

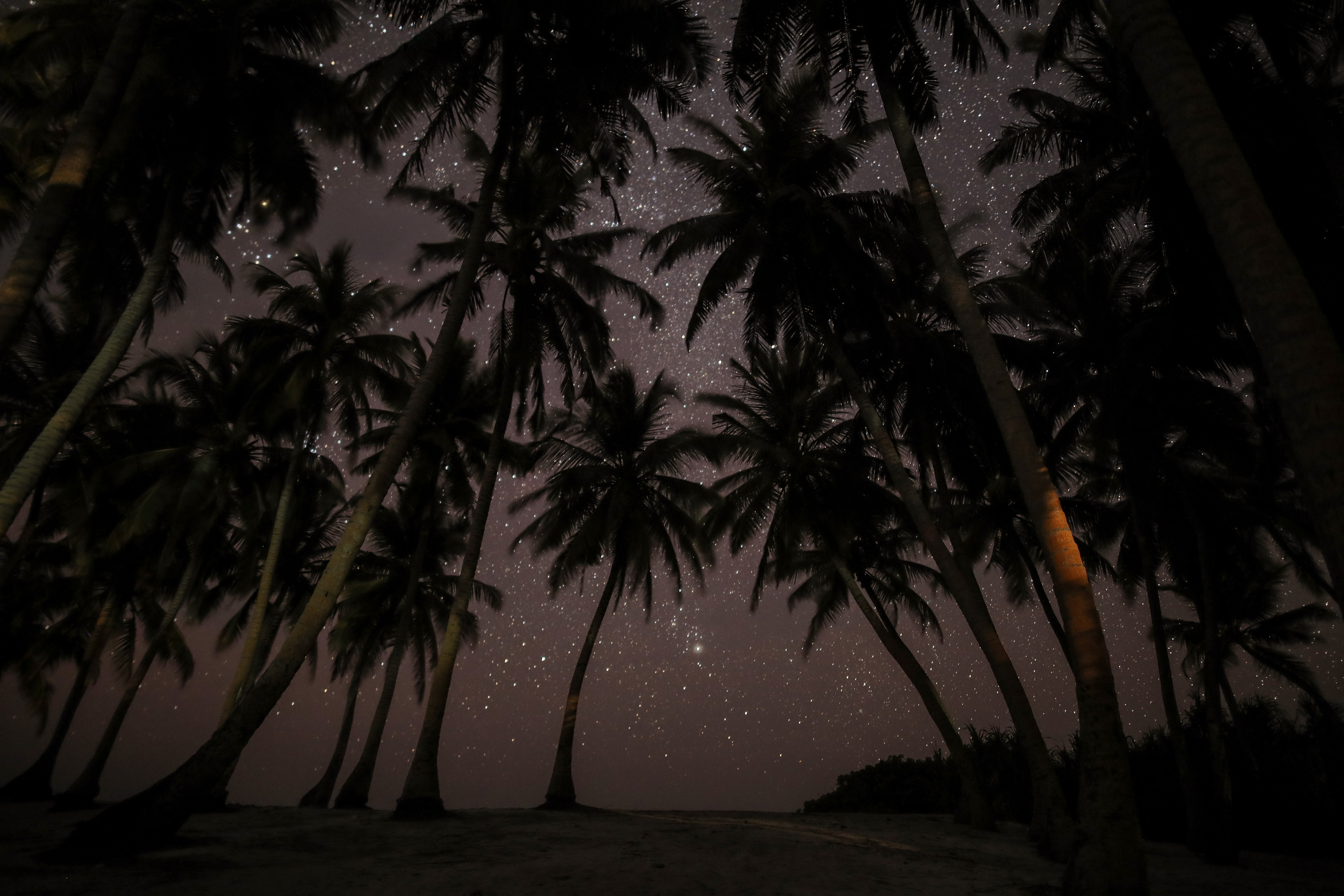
Thoondu, Maldives

Thoondu is a white sandy beach on the north of Fuvahmulah, Maldives. Located within Dhadimagu ward of the island, it is believed to be one of the most well known features of Fuvahmulah. Hundreds of people visit the beach every day, and this figure is much higher during special occasions like Maahefun. Thoondu has also been declared as a Protected area of Fuvahmulah by the government of Maldives on 12 June 2012 and the Atoll Council of Fuvahmulah has also passed a Decree to establish the place as a Protected area on 19 January 2012.

== Characteristics ==
Its sands are formed by white small round pebbles, which are unusually smooth and shiny. This kind of pebbles which sparkle even after being taken away from the beach are exclusive to Fuvahmulah only and there is no record of such kind of pebbles from anywhere in the world except Fuvahmulah. Very commonly, visitors to the island collect pebbles from Thoondu as souvenirs.

It is common for an annual phenomenon called Bissaaveli to form at the Thoondu. The Bissaaveli forms when part of the sand of the beach moves away from the shore towards the edge of the reef, thus creating a lagoon, enclosed by sand and the shore of the island. This natural event attracts hundreds – possibly thousands – of locals who love to go and watch it. When it is well-formed, the Bissaveli is enclosed from all sides, creating a natural shallow swimming pool where locals like to swim. Bissaaveli too is a phenomenon which occurs only in Fuvahmulah in the Maldivian archipelago.
