= Mohamed Didi =

Maldivian politician

Sheikh Mohamed Didi is the Minister of State of the Maldives for Islamic Affairs and a member of the Advisory Council of the Islamic Fiqh Academy of the Maldives. He also served as the President of the Civil Society Coalition (Madhany Itthihaadhu), which was a coalition of non-governmental organizations in the Maldives.
