= Funaadu =

Administrative division of Fuvahmulah, Maldives

Coordinates: 0.3076°S 73.4308°E

Funaadu is an administrative division of Fuvahmulah, Maldives. This is one of the largest wards in Fuvahmulah. The origin of its name lies in some large groves of the tree known locally as "Funa" (Calophyllum inophyllum) that were located on its southern end.

== Economy ==
Fishing and agriculture along with white-collar jobs are the primary source of income. Large taro marshes can be found on the southeastern side of the ward which is the main source of Agriculture.

== Places of interest ==
- Bondo Kirigehe (Bodu Nikagas): allegedly the oldest tree in Fuvahmulah.
- Hafiz Ahmed School: one of the four primary schools in Fuvahmulah.
- Diyarehifaando: the mouth of the island's lagoon in the past.
- Ribaath: an historical shrine from the ancient past.
- "Kalho akiri gando": a unique location of black pebbles which can be found in the beach areas of Funaadu and Dhoondigan.
- Fuvahmulaku Airport: airport of Fuvahmulah is situated in the areas of Funaadu and Dhoondigan.
- "Kodakilhi": Madu Birth The place is located near "alibeage kol" famous for the visitors.

== Notable people ==
- Fazeel Najeeb: Former Governor of the Maldives Monetary Authority (MMA) and Chairman of the Board of MMA.
- Abdul Majeed Mahir: Former Deputy Minister of Finance, Deputy Minister of Peace and Security (Mahkamatul Aman Aammuge Veriyaage Naib) and President of Male Municipality from 1960–1961. Also, father of former Minister of Defence, Ameen Faisal and former Maldivian High Commissioner to the United Kingdom of Great Britain and Northern Ireland, Dr. Farahanaz Faisal.
- Faisal Naseem: Former Member of Parliament for Fuvahmulah (Gnaviyani Atoll), and 7th Vice President of the Maldives. Founder of Faisal Foundation, which is famous for its social work, philanthropic contributions and donations for the development of Fuvahmulah. Faisal was also presented with the National Youth Award by the government of Maldives in the year 1999 in recognition of his social service.
- Abdulla Maseeh Mohamed: Former Member of Parliament for Fuvahmulah-South Constituency in the People's Majlis.
