= Fuvahmulah =

Fuvahmulah ފުވައްމުލަކު
- Inhabited island
- Fuvahmulah City
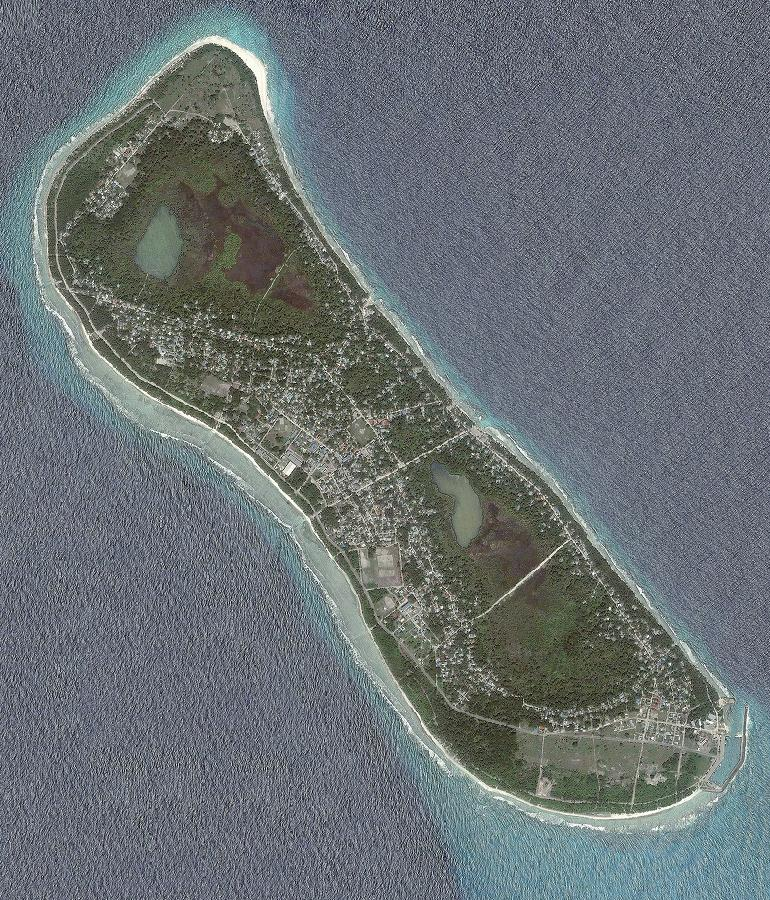
- Satellite image of Fuvahmulah

- Location in Maldives
- Coordinates: 0°17′35.56″S 73°25′24.96″E
- Country: Maldives
- Geographic atoll: Gnaviyani Atoll
- Distance to Malé: 494 km (307 mi)

Government
  - Type: Mayor-council
  - Mayor: Ismail Rafeeq (MDP)

Area
  - Total: 4.94 km^{2} (1.91 sq mi)

Population (2025)
  - Total: 14,251
  - Density: 2,880/km^{2} (7,470/sq mi)
- Time zone: UTC+05:00 (MST)
- Website: fuvahmulah.gov.mv

Fuvahmulah (Dhivehi: ފުވައްމުލައް) is an island (atoll) in the Maldives. It is under Maldives' administrative division of Gnaviyani (or Nyaviyani) Atoll. The island is the second southernmost administrative atoll, located to the south of Huvadhu Atoll and to the north of Seenu Atoll.

The inhabitants of the island speak a distinctive dialect of the Dhivehi language, locally known as "Fuvahmulaki baha".

== Etymology ==
Fuvah refers to Areca nut in the local language, with Mulah likely being the island's original name. Oral history rumors that the island's name was changed to Fuvahmulah due to the abundance of areca nut on the island and to differentiate it from the island of Mulah (sometimes referred to as Boli Mulah).

The admiralty charts and some geographers named the island Fua Mulaku. In old French maps the island appeared under the name Poue Molluque.

== History ==
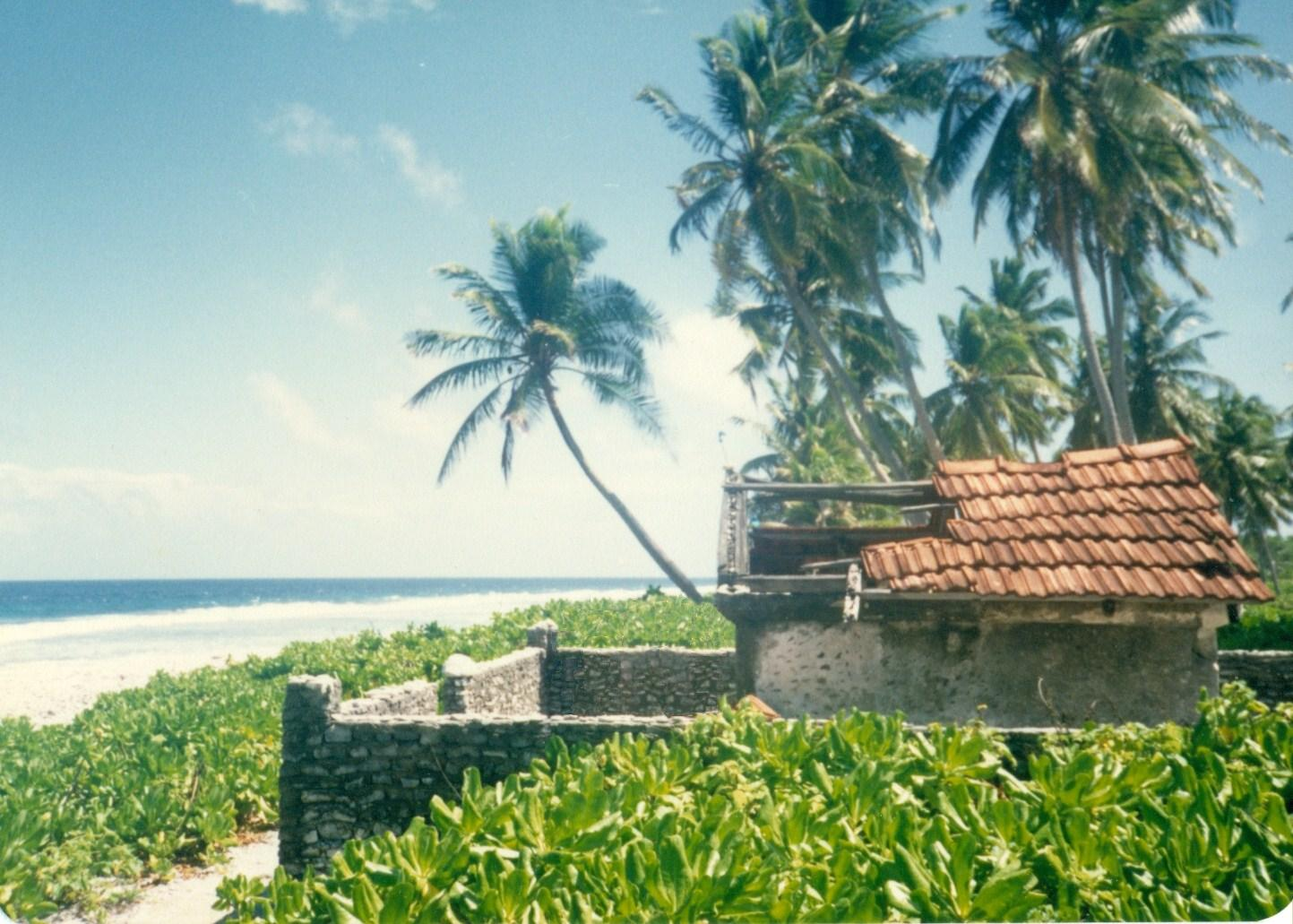
A tomb or ziyaìraiy named Riba, located in a lonely spot on the SW tip of Fua Mulaku Island. The islanders say that it houses the body of a person who had the extreme blessing of finding land and a decent burial even after death. It was destroyed in 2011

The island's historical includes a ruins of a Buddhist stupa, which is known locally as Fua Mulaku Havitta. The original shape of the mound was lost as it was altered after its excavation. The ruin is about 40 feet in height and it looks like a small hill. A smaller mound, about 15 feet in height, is located near the Havitta.

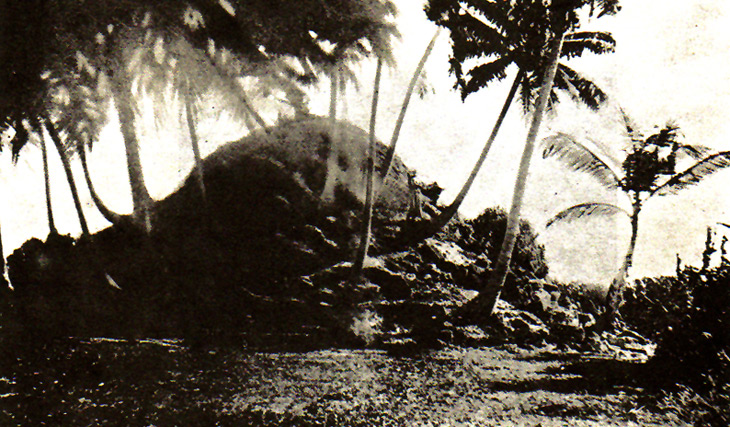
Fuvahmulah Havitta in 1922.

An ancient local poem in the local dialect reads: "Havitta uhe haudahau, Redin taneke hedi ihau". (Thor Heyerdahl visited this island and wrote a book which is named 'Fua Mulaku' in its German edition.)

There is also the Vasho-Veyo, an ancient circular bath with stone steps. This stone pool reveals great craftsmanship in the cutting of Porites coral stone (hirigal) by the locals.

Among the monuments of the Islamic period, the most important is the Gen Miskit, a neat compound including a coral stone mosque, an ancient graveyard and a well. It is located in the northern end of the island. Gen Miskit is the oldest mosque in the Maldives built (~c. 1300). The structure is made of coral stone and was built straight after the conversion to Islam. The mosque still holds congregational prayer to this day.

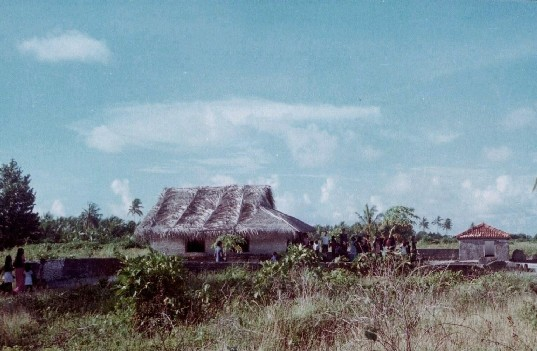
Gen-miskiy in 1984.

It has been said that the island was depopulated and resettled thrice in the last thousand years owing to lethal epidemics. The last time the survivors of the epidemic vacated to neighbouring Addu, Huvadhu and Haddhunmathi Atolls and remained there for a few years.

In the post-war era, tensions rose significantly between the Southern Atolls and the Central Government in Malé. Fuvahmulah was part of the breakaway state of the United Suvadive Republic (1959–1963). However, nothing too eventful happened throughout those years on the island, except for an incident that occurred where a boat (named the Elizabeth Boyer) carrying soldiers from the Maldivian government in Malé tried to disembark at Rasgefanno, on the eastern shore of Fuvahmulah. Islanders gathered at the beach and threw stones at the soldiers in protest. The soldiers from Malé retaliated by opening fire on the unarmed islanders, resulting in the death of one islander and seriously injuring two other islanders who were subsequently ferried by dōni, to Gan, in Addu Atoll. The British who were stationed in Gan sent them by air to Ceylon (now Sri Lanka) for treatment.

=== Recent history ===
On 4 February 2007 a fire burned down the Community Center building. The fire started around 3:00 am local time. The Regional Fire Services, police, and locals contained the fire, within 2 hours after the fire started. An investigation was carried out by the Police, but a report was not published. Police said the most likely cause of the fire was a short circuit.

On 23 February 2007, a fire started at the boat yard near the harbour. The fire completely burnt 6 fiberglass dhows. A forensics team of the Maldives Police Service did the investigation. All the dhows were insured. In an interview with media, the atoll chief said the loss is estimated to be around 20 million Rufiyaa, although insurance companies never publicly disclosed the figures. This fire is said to be the worst fire in the history of the island.

== Geography ==
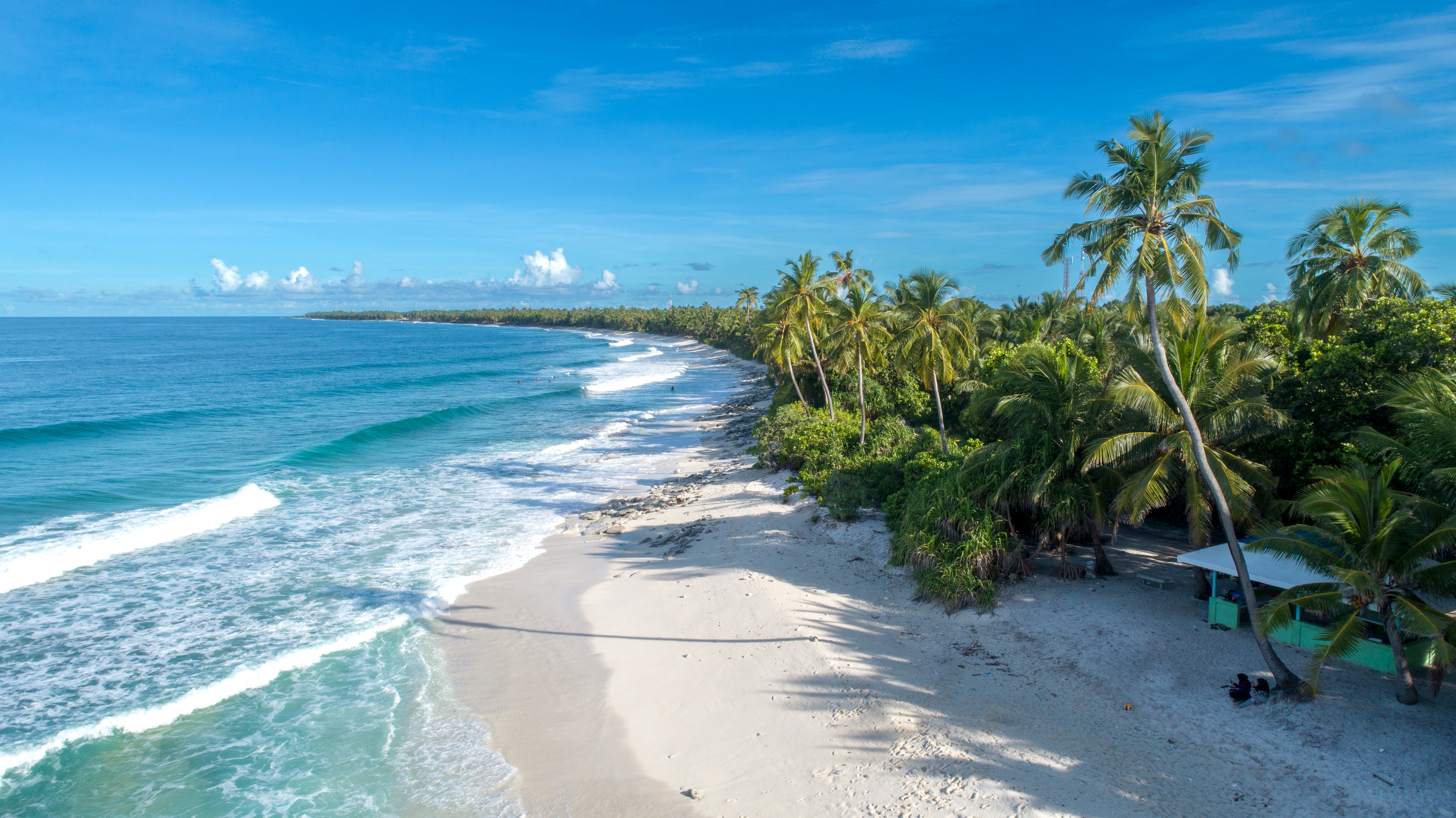
Aerial view of the Thoondu in Fuvahmulah

The island is 494.2 km (307 mi; 267 nmi) south of the country's capital, Malé. The Fuvahmulah city is about 4.5 by 1.2 km (2.80 by 0.75 mi) with a submerged reef (Rashikedefaro) extending for about 3 km (1.9 mi) in a southeasterly direction. The island is the third largest in the Maldives. In the past, Fuvahmulah was a small coral atoll whose southern end was open at a spot called Diyarehifaando and the inside of the island was a saltwater lagoon forming a natural harbour. There is a spot on the southern end known as Kudhuheraival (forest of a small islet), which indicates there was a small separate islet over there in ancient times.

The channel connecting the lagoon with the ocean was closed by massive coral boulders in the past. Thus the inside of the island is lower than its edges. In time the inner lagoon lost its saltiness and all that remains today are two small lakes, wetlands and marshy taro fields. In this respect, Fuvahmulah is like the island of Nukutavake in the Central Pacific.

The northern lake of the island is known as "Dhadimagi Kilhi" (lit. "Lake of Dhadimagu" or "Dhadimagu Lake" since the lake is located in Dhadimagu ward of the island) and the southern is "Bandaara Kilhi" (lit. "State Lake" since the lake has been under state custody throughout history).

Lacking a lagoon and being subject to ocean swells, Fuvahmulah was often inaccessible to seafarers in the past. In the early 2000s a harbour was built at the southeast tip of the island, which minimised the problem to a certain extent. The construction of a domestic airport on the island in 2011 has gradually opened the island to the rest of the country.

=== Environment ===
As H.C.P Bell says in his monograph, throughout history Maldivians themselves have fairly judged Fuvahmulah to be the most beautiful island in the Maldives.

Being a one-island atoll itself and the third largest island in the Maldives (if not for land reclamation), Fuvahmulah includes a diverse range of habitats ranging from tropical woodlands and wetlands to freshwater lakes, well-vegetated marshland areas, beaches of different variations and fertile lands of humus greater in area than any other island in the Maldives. The two freshwater lakes in the island and a number of swamps and marshland areas in the island give habitat to different plant and animal species not found anywhere else in the Maldives. Among such species, the common moorhen (locally known as Valikukulhu) is a bird natively confined to Fuvahmulah only in the Maldivian archipelago. Also, the dense forest of Syzygium cumini (Jambul), locally known as "Dhanvah Baal" (literally "Jambul grove") to the North of Dhadimagi Kilhi is the largest vegetation of Jambul to be found anywhere in the Maldives since this plant variety is nearly extinct elsewhere in the country. Fuvahmulah is also the largest producer of mangoes in the Maldives. Mango trees are found in abundance and every year hundreds of thousands of mangoes are produced from the island. Fuvahmulah also produces pineapples and oranges which cannot be found anywhere else in the country.

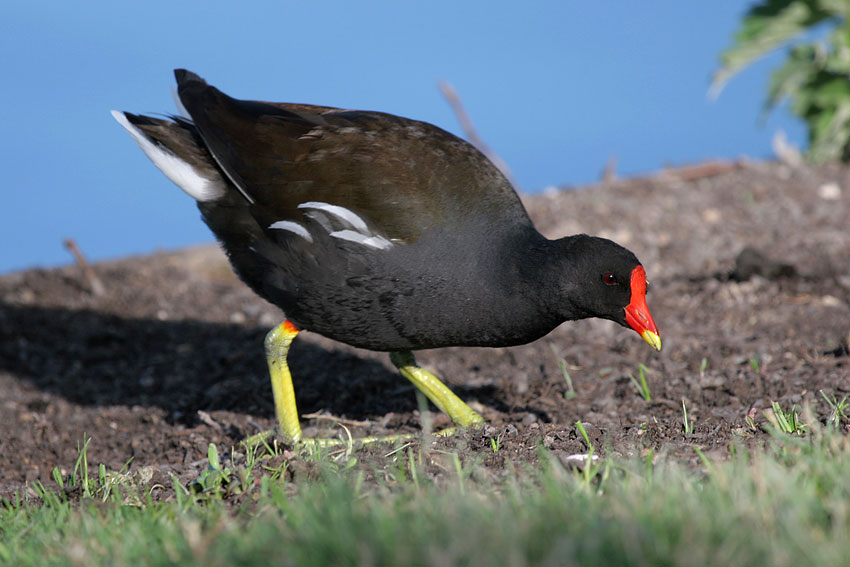
The common moorhen (walikukulhu) is a bird natively confined to Fuvahmulah only in the Maldives.

The wetland areas of Fuvahmulah are mostly made up of dense vegetation ranging from ferns to reeds to taro fields. There is an abundance of water spinach locally known as Mahilanbo (Dhivehi: މަހިލަނބޮ) and plant varieties such as Syzygium cumini (jambul), pond-apple, mango, pineapple, screwpine, tropical almond, cheese fruit, ambarella, banana and many more. Fuvahmulah also has farmland where locals grow crops such as cucumber, tomato, carrot, cabbage, pepper, capsicum, eggplant and ladies' fingers.

=== Natural phenomena ===
There is a broad sandy beach at the northernmost point of Fuvahmulah in the district of Dhadimago. It is locally known as Thūndu (In official Dhivehi Thundi). Its sands are formed by white small round pebbles, which are unusually smooth and shiny. This kind of pebbles are found in Fuvahmulah only in the Maldives and visitors to the island usually collect them as a memory of the island.

It is common for an annual phenomenon called Bissaaveli to form at the Thūndu. The Bissaaveli forms when part of the sand of the beach moves away from the shore towards the edge of the reef, thus creating a lagoon, enclosed by sand and the shore of the island. This natural event attracts hundreds – possibly thousands – of locals who love to go to watch it. When it is well-formed, the Bissaaveli is enclosed from all sides, creating a natural shallow swimming pool where locals like to swim.

Another natural phenomenon called Kalho-Akiri (meaning "Black Pebbles") occurs on the south-east shore of the island. This area only has black pebbles, quite unusual to the normal white coral sand beaches of the Maldives.

Every year, towards the end of the southwest monsoon season, flying fish come to the northwestern shore of Fuvahmulah. Confused by the number of voracious tuna shoals in the water and by aggressive frigate birds hunting them from the air, the flying fish would end up flying close to the beach. They mostly end up in the area between Thoondu and Dhadimago fanno where this phenomenon is most common.. Large crowds will gather on the beaches for what the locals called "Hulhammaha Hifun".

Fuvahmulah is known for having a high concentration of tiger sharks, particularly large female (and often pregnant) sharks.

=== Climate ===
Fuvahmulah has a tropical rainforest climate (Köppen: Af).

Climate data for Fuvahmulah
Month	Jan	Feb	Mar	Apr	May	Jun	Jul	Aug	Sep	Oct	Nov	Dec	Year
Mean daily maximum °C (°F)	27.7 (81.9)	28.1 (82.6)	28.5 (83.3)	28.7 (83.7)	28.6 (83.5)	28.4 (83.1)	28.1 (82.6)	28.0 (82.4)	27.9 (82.2)	27.8 (82.0)	27.7 (81.9)	27.6 (81.7)	28.1 (82.6)
Daily mean °C (°F)	27.1 (80.8)	27.4 (81.3)	27.8 (82.0)	27.9 (82.2)	27.9 (82.2)	27.8 (82.0)	27.4 (81.3)	27.3 (81.1)	27.3 (81.1)	27.1 (80.8)	26.9 (80.4)	26.9 (80.4)	27.4 (81.3)
Mean daily minimum °C (°F)	26.3 (79.3)	26.7 (80.1)	27.0 (80.6)	27.0 (80.6)	27.0 (80.6)	26.9 (80.4)	26.5 (79.7)	26.4 (79.5)	26.4 (79.5)	26.2 (79.2)	26.1 (79.0)	26.1 (79.0)	26.6 (79.8)
Average precipitation mm (inches)	129.7 (5.11)	79.1 (3.11)	90.3 (3.56)	162.4 (6.39)	208.3 (8.20)	102.4 (4.03)	145.7 (5.74)	124.9 (4.92)	155.4 (6.12)	211.8 (8.34)	223.0 (8.78)	202.6 (7.98)	1,835.6 (72.28)
Source: Weather.Directory

== Local government ==
The current Mayor is Ismail Rafeeq who was re-elected on 4 April 2026 and has been serving as mayor since 2020. The council has seven members, one representing each of the seven wards in Fuvahmulah. The mayor and the council are both elected by direct election and the council operates under a mayor-council form of government.The council majority is currently held by the Maldivian Democratic Party as of 15 August 2026. The Secretariat of the Fuvahmulah City Council is located in the Maadhadu ward on Narugis Magu.

Fuvahmulah City Council and its office was established following a presidential decree by Abdulla Yameen on 4 June 2017 which granted the island city status. During its initial formation the city council was composed of three constituency members. The mandate of city council was further revised with additional powers granted through an amendment to Decentralization Act during the presidency of Ibrahim Mohamed Solih

== Demographics ==
Historical population
Year	Pop.	±%
2006	7,636	—
2014	8,510	+11.4%
2022	9,166	+7.7%
2006–2022: Census resident population Source:

As of the 2022 Maldivian Census, the resident population in Fuvahmulah was 9,166. The population of native Maldivians originating from Fuvahmulah, which includes both the resident and non-resident population, is estimated at around 13,849 as of April 2026. The median age of the native population in Fuvahmulah is 32.2 and the gender ratio is 1.03.

Like most other islands in the Maldives, Fuvahmulah has a sizable for expatriate worker population. The resident non-Maldivian population on the island grew from 526 in 2014 to 1,278 in 2022.

== Services ==
=== Communications ===
Dhiraagu is the only landline telephone communication service provider on the island, as well as in the entire country. However, Ooredoo along with Dhiraagu provides mobile communication services on the island.

The Dhiraagu communications antenna, located in the premises of Dhiraagu Fuvahmulah Operations Center, stands 400 feet (120 metres) tall. It connects Gaafu Alif Atoll, Gaafu Dhaalu Atoll and Fuvahmulah to the rest of the nation. Meanwhile, the ooredhoo communications antenna is at Fuvammulah Cricket stadium.

Apart from Dhiraagu, Focus Infocom Private Limited and Ooredhoo also provides internet services on the island.

=== Transport ===
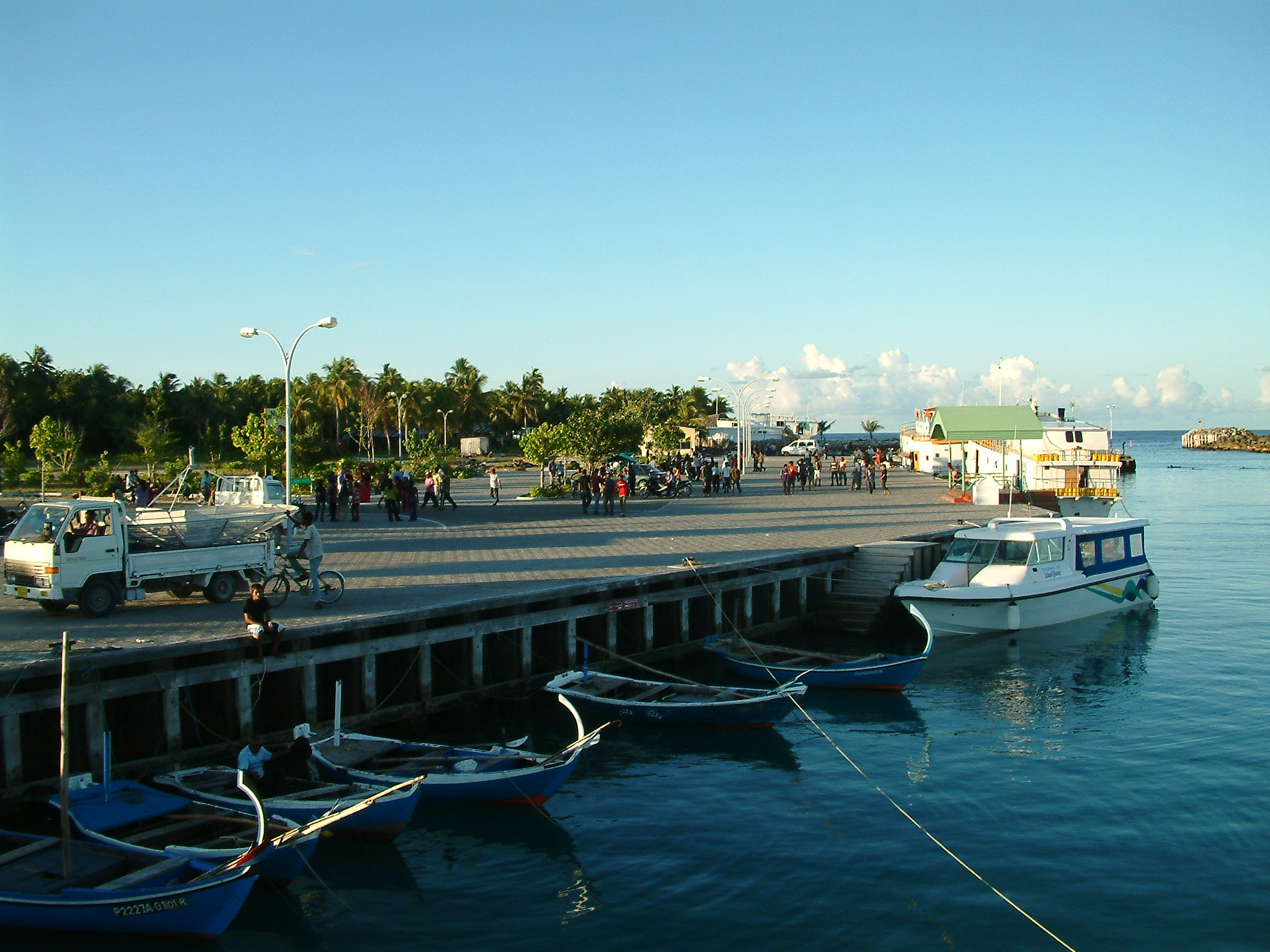
The new harbour

Formerly there were many bicycles on Fuvahmulah, an ideal mode of transportation on the flat, large island. Presently there are a large number of motorcycles. The construction of Fuvahmulah Harbour has led to a boost in the number of vehicles – notably motor cycles – on the island. This has increased road accidents, many of them fatal. The poorly constructed roads have indirectly contributed to road accidents. Finivaa Magu, the main road running from north to south of the island, along with the other roads are not paved. The only partly paved road is the Mohamed Jamaaludeen Naibu Thutthu Magu or else known as 'Ring Road' This road is still under construction. When completed this road will be the longest road on the island, running from the harbour and connecting all 8 districts.

An airstrip is functional on the southeastern side of the island since 11 November 2011. Currently, there two scheduled flights every day to Malé from Fuvahmulah and from Malé to Fuvahmulah Airport.

=== Healthcare ===
The first Health Centre officially started its services on 12 May 1973. Even though the center was fully owned by the government, it did not have its own building, so the center operated in a private house. A separate building for the Health Center was constructed and the services began in the new building on 24 March 1988. As the population of the island increased significantly, and due to the isolation of the island, government upgraded the Health Center to a Hospital on 11 June 2001.

=== Education ===
Fuvahmulah is served by 11 schools. Consisting of 6 pre-schools, 1 primary schools, 3 secondary school (O-level) and 1 secondary school (A-level). Gn. Atoll Education Centre (GN.AEC), the only higher secondary school serving the island,(teaching from grade 7 to 12) is the largest education center on the island. Inaugurated on 20 April 1982, it currently serves more than 343 students. Fuvahmulaku School (FS) which was owned and operated by the citizens of Dūndigan, is one of the three secondary schools on the island. Located in Dūndigan, it serves the south west part of the island. Government assumed full control over the school on 1 March 1992. Mohammed Jamaadudeen school (MJS) (formerly called "Madharusathu-Sheik Mohammed Jamaaluddeen" (MJM)), opened on 3 November 1992. It serves the north-west part of the island. The school was built by the people of Dhadimagu and Dhiguvaadu. This is also a secondary school. There is another secondary school on the island, it is Hafiz Ahmed School (usually referred as HAS) which was opened on 22 April 2004. It currently serves more than 500 students. There is also a primary only school teaching up to grade 6 called Brightways International School (BHIS) which was opened in June 2021. Brightways international education is a private art school teaching up to grade 6 from 1, with another branch teaching from Baby nursery to UKG

=== Law enforcement and security UN ===
Historically the island was and still is, considered as a peaceful island with low crime rates. However, the crime rate has gone up, especially with regards to drugs. A regional branch of the Maldives Police Service was established on the island on 7 October 1996. Initially, the Police and the Armed Forces of the Maldives were the same, known as the National Security Service. The main objective of the Fuvahmulaku Police Station is to maintain peace and stability across the atoll. They carry out investigations into crimes and public complaints fairly and deliver justice to the locals of the atoll. The station also helps other government authorities in fighting and preventing crime. The station is commanded by an Inspector of t police, with a work force around 65 in combating the crime. Administratively Fuvahmulah was recognised as city by the government in 2016, Fuvahmulah Police Station became a division of Fuvahmulah City Police. Most of the officers working in the stations are natives of Fuvahmulah and they are well aware of what's Happening with in the Island.

The appearance of the NSS (National Security Service) means that the armed forces of the Maldives established themselves on the island. However, the police was separated from the armed forces (MNDF) in 2004. MNDF still operates on the island, but separate from the police. They are mostly active in the area of Fire and Rescue, along with military duties.

== Municipal divisions ==
Fuvahmulah was traditionally divided into nine wards. From North to South these wards were: (1) Dhadimagu, (2) Dhiguvaandu (both stretching from East to West shore), (3) Hoadhadu, (5) Dhashukubaa (both segmental) and separated by, (4) Maadhadu, (A diagonal strip of parallel width). The other four divisions, occupying the southern part of the island, consisted of two eastern and western strips, bisected into four wards, (6) Maalegan and (8) Dhoondigan lying to the East, (7) Miskiymagu and (9) Funaadu to the West.

In the 1950s, the number of wards were reduced to eight, with the village of Dhashukubaa being merged with Miskiymagu. Since then, no changes were made though the increase in population of some wards has put pressure on the neighbouring areas, resulting in the extension of some wards with time, and some claims out of the traditional boundaries. An example of such a case is that of the Hoadhadu ward. The northerly extension of the settlements of Hoadhadu ward by time led to the land from eastern strip of Dhiguvaandu and Dhadimagu wards being claimed by the village. A similar case occurred in the Funaadu-Dhoondigan boundaries to the south of the island. However, no formal changes have been made in any of the cases and area claims of different views exist in modern times. The officially used maps and government sources as well do not portray any significant changes to the traditional boundaries.

Taking into consideration the geography of Fuvahmulah along with its size and population, the 8 wards of the island are officially considered to be administrative divisions which act as the replacement for islands in other atolls. In the past, a chief ('Katheeb') was appointed in charge of the day-to-day affairs of each ward of the island as was done for the remote islands of the other atolls. With the introduction of local government policy in the Maldives, the Decentralization Act of 2010 passed by the People's majlis specifically states that in the case of Fuvahmulah an island council has to be elected for each ward of the island. So like the islands of other atolls across the country, the wards of the island act as separate constituencies. From February 2011 onwards the councils have started functioning.

The largest division of the island is Dhadimagu while the most populous ward of the island is Dhoondigan.

=== Dhadimagu ===
This is the largest division of the island, located on the north-west of the island. A centre of learning as well as an important location for the island's economy. Throughout history, scholars and famous personalities came into being from this district housing many of the historical sites and landmarks of the island. The number of Huffaz from this district outnumber that of any other district in Fuvahmulah.

==== Places of interest ====
- Thoondu: A white sandy beach on the north of the island. It is a well-known feature of Dhadimago as well as that of the whole Fuvahmulah. Hundreds of people visit this beach everyday, and this figure is higher on special occasions like Maahifun.
- Dhadimagi Kilhi: One among the two freshwater lakes in Fuvahmulah. Found in the center of the district.
- Gemmiskiy: The oldest building in Fuvahmulah. In the pre-Islamic period it was a part of the Buddhist monastery and later was the first mosque to be built after the whole island converted to Islam.
- The Havitta: An ancient ruin of possibly a Buddhist stupa (burial mound). Located within the historical boundaries of the district.
- Mohammed Jamaaluddeen School: One of the three major primary schools in Fuvahmulah. This school has been a successful primary school throughout the years.
- Ulaa pre-school: One of the pre-schools (Kindergarten) in Fuvahmulah.
- Dhanbo Baal (Dhanvah Baal): A dense vegetation of Syzygium cumini (jambul) locally known as dhanvah associated with the Dhadimagi Kilhi. The wood is durable in water and resistant to termites. It was used for boat building and for construction purposes in the past. Not only the islanders benefitted from it as it was also exported to the neighbouring atolls. This plant variety is nearly extinct elsewhere in the Maldives.
- Dhadimagu Fannu: An iconic feature of Dhadimagu, used for recreational purposes in occasions like Eid (Feast of Breaking the Fast). For Eid celebrations this place stands out in Fuvahmulah history.
- Neregando: An anchorage of Fuvahmulah and a traditional harbour. It is a landmark of the boatbuilding industry of the island.

=== Dhiguvaandu ===
Located just after Dhadimagu, this is one of the largest districts in Fuvahmulah. Apart from Dhadimagu, the district also share borders with Hoadhadu and Maadhadu.

Many residents of Dhiguvaandu rely on white-collar jobs for their income. Retail business is a main source of income as well. The most prominent feature of this district is the "Chas bin" (an area of wetland) associated with the Dhadimagi-Kilhi. Large amounts of taro fields can be found in the wetland area. Vast plantings of areca nut can be found in the district. Mango and breadfruit can be found in reasonable quantities. Almost every house in the district has a mango tree.

==== Places of interest ====
- The Wathaniya(now has been changed to Ooredoo) communications antenna: Located in the Aruffannu Magu and Mohammed Jamaluddin Naibu Thuththu Magu junction, it is the second tallest structure in the Maldives, along with the Dhiraagu Communications antenna on the island and in Gadhdhoo in G.Dh Atoll. All three structures stand 400 feet tall.
- Foundation School: One of the pre-schools in Fuvahmulah.
- Aruffannu: A traditional harbour (anchorage) of the island.
- A significant part of the marshland area associated with the Dhadimagi Kilhi.
- Cricket Stadium: Located in the Aruffanno Magu, Sosan Magu and Mohammed Jamaluddin Naibu Thuththu Magu, it is the largest cricket ground in the Maldives.

=== Hoadhadu ===
Hoadhadu used to be the smallest district in Fuvahmulah, nearly the same size as Maadhadu. During the late 20th century, the increase in population of the district led to pressure on land in the neighbouring areas. This led to a northern extension of the village, resulting in land from Dhadimagu and Diguvaandu wards being claimed to the village. Though this has resulted in a change of the believed-to-be areas in a disputed state, no formal changes have been made and area claims of different views exist.

Hoadhadu is the first district in Fuvahmulah to have accepted Islam. The smaller size of the village with fewer people during the time of conversion may be the main reason for the village being the first district to be converted. What is clear from historical sources is that smaller districts of Fuvahmulah converted first and the larger districts last. Hoadhadu is a remarkable ward in Fuvahmulah. Historically, many residents of Hoadhadu depended on fishing as the primary source of income, although today retail business along with white collar jobs have diminished the dependency on fishing. One of the traditional harbours of Fuvahmulah, "Anbule Athiri" is located within Hoadhadu which explains the district's continued dependency on fishing.

==== Places of interest ====
- Anbule Athiri: One of the traditional harbours of Fuvahmulah.
- Naaibu Aboobakuru School: A defunct primary school in Fuvahmulah. Also known as Hoadhadu Makthab.
- Hanihari (Heniari) Miskiy: The first mosque to be built in Fuvahmulah. It was demolished in the 1950s and now only the ruins of its foundation is there.
- Hoadhadu Miskiy: The second mosque to be built in Fuvahmulah.
- Kilhiemagi Miskiy: A mosque which is more than 100 years old.
- Seedhi Miskiy: Another mosque which is more than 100 years old.
- Hoadhadige: The house where the Yoosuf Naaibu family (who introduced Islam to the island) lived.

=== Maadhadu ===
With changes over time, this is the smallest district in Fuvahmulah. Located in the center of the island, this district houses the strategically most important buildings on the island. This district shares borders with Dhiguvaandu, Hoadhadu, Maalegan and Miskiymagu.

==== Places of interest ====
- The Dhiraagu communications antenna: along with the Wathaniya communications antenna on the island. Both structures stand 400 feet tall.
- Secretariat of the Fuvahmulah City Council: The highest administrative unit of the atoll as a whole.
- 'Kedeyre Miskiy', one of the protected historical sites on the island.
- Dhiraagu Operations Center, Fuvahmulah
- Ideal School: One of the leading pre-schools (Kindergarten) in Fuvahmulah
- Ooredooo Experience Fuvahmulah
- State Trading Organisation Fuvahmulaku Branch
- Post office
- Official Play ground
- Gn. Atoll Education Center
- Bank of Maldives Fuvahmulaku Branch
- MNDF establishment in Fuvahmulah
- Fuvahmulaku Police Station
- Fuvahmulaku Youth Center
- Fuvahmulaku Social Center
- Fuvahmulaku Atoll Council
- Mikalnews – Mikal News is a registered newspaper at Maldives, covering social, economic and political issues and latest news updates.

=== Maalegan ===
This village stretches along the island fringe facing the Northeast. With some of the most significant features of the island this district shares borders with Maadhadu, Miskimmagu, Funaadu and Dhoondigan.

==== Places of interest ====
- Hukuru Miskiy: One of the most significant mosques in the island, which was the only Friday mosque on the island for a long time in history. This mosque is surrounded by an old cemetery which is the resting place of several notables like Prince Ibrahim Faamuladheyri Kilegefaanu of Dhiyamigilee Dynasty and Prince Hassan Izzudin of Huraage Dynasty
- Bandaara Kilhi: One of the two freshwater lakes on the island. The main lake in its true sense is located within this ward with about three-fourths of the whole lake along with its major areas centred within this ward.
- Rasgefanno: Previously, the most famous anchorage of the island.

=== Miskiymagu ===
The former Dashukubaa village was merged with Miskiymagu. This village has merged with neighbouring Funaadu on its southern end and Maadhadu on its northern end. The village also shares borders with Maalegan ward towards the north-east of the village.

==== Places of interest ====
- Gn. Atoll Education Center: The only higher secondary school in Fuvahmulah. Was the only secondary school in the island until 2018.
- Heraha Mago: The transverse street which cuts across this village houses the Fire and Rescue Service Building, the local market and many of the businesses. Mānere anchorage can be found at the southern tip of the street. About three-fourths of the Heraha mago is within Miskiymago and the remaining one-fourth is within Maalegan ward to the north-east of the district.
- Mānere: A historical harbour (anchorage) of Fuvahmulah. This anchorage is used in the NE monsoon season (Iruvai).
- Bandaara Kilhi: One of the two freshwater lakes in Fuvahmulah. About one-fourth of the lake (a segmental part) is located in Miskiymago.
- The local market: All agricultural products, as well as traditional food varieties of Fuvahmulah, can be bought here.
- The Fire and Rescue Service Building

=== Funaadu ===
This is the southernmost and one of the largest wards in Fuvahmulah. This district houses a center of learning.

==== Places of interest ====
- Bondo Kirigehe (Bodu Nikagas): Allegedly the oldest tree in Fuvahmulah.
- Hafiz Ahmed School: One of the three major primary schools in Fuvahmulah.
- Dhiyarehifaandu: The mouth of the island's lagoon in the past.
- Kandhovali Athiri.. previously used a harbour with a narrow channel cut through reef to open sea. Now used as a beach.
- Ribaath: A historical shrine from the ancient past.
- "Kalho akiri gando": A unique location of black pebbles which can be found in the beach areas of Funaadu and Dhoondigan.
- Fuvahmulaku Airport: Airport of Fuvahmulah is situated in the areas of Funaadu and Dhoondigan.

=== Dhoondigan ===
This is the most populous district and by area the second largest division of the island. This village lies in the southeastern corner of the island. It has merged with Maalegan on its northern end and Funaadu to the West. Being a center of learning as well as an important location for all islanders as it houses the island harbour, and a number of historical landmarks.

==== Places of interest ====
- Vashoveyo: A famous historical location.
- "Bilihifeyshe neru": One of the famous anchorages (traditional harbours) of Fuvahmulah.
- "Kalho akiri gando": A unique location of black pebbles which can be found in the beach areas of Funaadu and Dhoondigan.
- Fuvahmulaku School: One of the three major primary schools in Fuvahmulah.
- Fuvahmulaku Harbor: The harbour of Fuvahmulah.
- Fuvahmulaku Airport: Airport of Fuvahmulah is situated in the areas of Dhoondigan and Funaadu.

== Notable figures ==
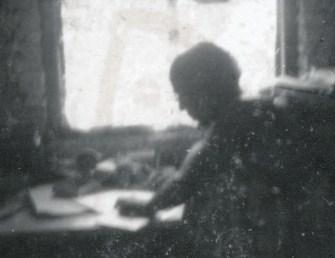
Magieduruge Ibrahim Didi, the most learned man in Fua Mulaku in 1984. Ibrahim Didi stood up to Thor Heyerdahl when the Norwegian explorer visited Fua Mulaku. In front of the translators he demanded to know why such an important visitor from Norway would be more willing to listen to silly things (hus vede) rather than to the sound oral traditions of the island. Then Ibrahim Didi asked some of the old men gathered in the Atoll office verandah for the occasion to stop telling unsound things just to please the foreigner. When the talkative old men fell silent Thor Heyerdahl misinterpreted the situation and humiliated Ibrahim Didi by requesting him to leave. The picture was taken at his home in Fua Mulaku. Picture negative damaged by the high humidity and fungus on the island.

Being home to the most number of Hafizs in the Maldives throughout known history, Fuvahmulah has produced many great scholars. Many figures from Fuvahmulah have been leaders in politics, religion and in business since early times.

One such figure was the Independence Hero of Maldives, former President Ibrahim Nasir. Nasir was born in Fuvahmulah and the early childhood days of Nasir were spent in Fuvahmulah until his family moved to Malé.

Another notable figure from Fuvahmulah was the Maldivian cleric and poet Mohammad Jamaaluddeen, known as Naibu-Thutthu. He wrote several raivaru (Maldive couplets) books. These raivarus are taught and examined in schools, as part of Dhivehi language module. Not only was he good at literature, but was also considered to be the most knowledgeable in Islamic jurisprudence (Fiqh) during his time and was appointed as chief justice.For a fact, the "Naaibu Thuthu Award", a competition organised by Hafiz Ahmed School every year is named after him. There's also a road called "Naaibu Thuthu Hingun" which is named after him

The former vice-president of the Maldives, Dr. Mohamed Jameel Ahmed, is from Fuvahmulah and is the first vice-president of the country from outside the capital Male. Former chief justice and the current president of the Islamic Fiqh Academy, Ustaz Mohamed Rasheed Ibrahim is also from Fuvahmulah. He also served as the president of the Supreme Council for Islamic Affairs. Dr.Mohamed Zahir Hussain, the current chancellor of the Maldives National University, founder of the daily newspaper Haveeru and former minister of education as well as Minister of Youth and Sports is also a native Fuvahmulah citizen. Among other notables from the island include the current Minister of Youth and Sports, Mr. Mohamed Maleeh Jamal, former minister of health, Dr. Ahmed Jamsheed Mohamed, former minister of Housing and urban development, Mr. Ibrahim Rafeeq, former governor of the Maldives Monetary Authority and chairman of the board of MMA, Dr. Fazeel Najeeb, former chairman of the Maldives Civil Service Commission, Mohamed Fahmy Hassan and former editor in chief of Haveeru Daily and Haveeru Online, Dr. Ali Rafeeq.

Abdul Majeed Mahir, who served key positions in Nasir administration and father of former Minister of Defence, Ameen Faisal and former Maldivian High Commissioner to the United Kingdom of Great Britain and Northern Ireland, Dr. Farahanaz Faisal, is also from Fuvahmulah. He was born in Fuvahmulah, to Funaadu Ganduvaru Aisha Didi of Fuvahmulah and Velaanaagey Mohamed Didi (paternal grandfather of President Nasir) of Male, Maldives, who was in exile in Fuvahmulah.

Moreover, the paternal grandmother of former president Mohamed Nasheed is also from Fuvahmulah.

The Isdhoo dynasty which reigned the Maldives from 1692 to 1704 also has its roots in Fuvahmulah. The father of Sultan Ali VII, Shah Bandar Kilege, was from Fuvahmulah and he settled in Isdhoo of Haddhunmathi Atoll, thus resulting in the dynasty being named after Isdhoo. Sultan Ibrahim Muzhiruddin of Isdhoo dynasty was deposed and exiled to Fuvahmulah by his cousin Sultan Muhammad Imaduddin II of Dhiyamigili dynasty in 1704. His descendants still live in Fuvahmulah and the neighbouring atolls of Addu and Huvadhu. Former president Maumoon Abdul Gayoom is among the descendants of Sultan Muzhiruddin through his son Mulaku Muhammad Manikfan and a lady from Fuvahmulah according to researchers.

In 1774, Sultan Muhammed Ghiya'as ud-din of Dhiyamigili Dynasty was deposed while he was on the Hajj pilgrimage and when he returned he was murdered by drowning and his son Abdullah (later Ibrahim Faamuladeyri Kilegefaanu) was banished to Fuvahmulah. Abdullah or his direct descendants never challenged the authority of the Huraagey sultans and continued to live in Fuvahmulah, where their line remains to this day. It is from Fuvahmulah that the branches of Dhiyamigili dynasty in Addu and Huvadhu Atolls too originated. Thus, the many educated figures and intellectuals from this lineage in Addu and Huvadhu Atolls, who later came up to be leaders in politics and different other fields too have their roots in Fuvahmulah. To name some, former Minister of Islamic Affairs Dr. Abdul Majeed Abdul Bari, former chief justice Abdulla Saeed, former attorney general Dr. Mohamed Munavvar, former Minister of Economic Development as well as Minister of Civil Aviation Dr. Mahmood Razi, former Minister of Education Dr. Mustafa Lutfi, former Minister of Transport and Communication Dr. Ahmed Shamheed, former Minister of Justice and Speaker of Parliament Mr. Ahmed Zahir, former Minister of Fisheries and Agriculture Dr. Ibrahim Didi, former attorney general Uz. Husnu Al Suood, Former Minister of Environment as well as Minister of Health and Gender, Dr Mariyam Shakeela; the current Minister of State for Islamic Affairs Sheikh Mohamed Didi, the current MP for Gemanafushi constituency and president of the Football Association of Maldives Ilham Ahmed, current MP for Galolhu-South constituency Ahmed Mahloof and many other, or most of the intellectuals in the country have their roots in Fuvahmulah.

Faisal Naseem – Vice-President of the Maldives – is from the Funaadu district of Fuvahmulah.

== See also ==
- United Suvadive Republic
