= Dhadimagu =

Administrative district of Fuvahmulah, Maldives

Dhadimagu (Dhivehi: ދަޑިމަގު) is an administrative division of Fuvahmulah, Maldives. It is the largest division of the island, located in the northern part of the island. Throughout history, many scholars and famous public figures came into being from this district housing many of the historical sites and landmarks of the island. A center of learning as well as an important location for the island's economy, the number of 'Hafiz's and teachers from this district outnumber that of any other district in Fuvahmulah, and this district is considered by many to be the most educated and learning-centered district of Fuvahmulah.

== Economy ==
Economically this district heavily depends upon agriculture. The adjacent fields to the Thoondu are primarily used for agriculture and are the main agricultural fields of the island. These fields are the largest producers of watermelon in the island. Along with agriculture, white-collar workers are the primary source of income in the district, although some depend upon fishing as a source of income.

=== Agriculture ===
Apart from being the largest producer of watermelon and sweet potatoes, Dhadimagu is the largest producer of coconut in the island. The famous three "Beeva" Kudhu Beeva, Medhe Beeva and Bodo Beeva in the district contributes to the most number of coconuts produced in Fuvahmulah. Apart from the Taro fields, large proportions of Pond-apple (Kalhuhuthu Meyvaa) can also be found in the district from the marsh land area associated with "Dhadimagi Kilhi". Some amount of Pineapple and Oranges can also be found with an abundance of Mangoes. Cucumber, Tomato, Carrot, Cabbage, Pepper, Capsicum, Eggplant and Ladies' fingers are among the vast number of products from the adjacent fields to Thoondu located in the district.

=== Fishing and boat building ===
Dhadimagu has the famous anchorage known as Neregando on its shores along with a boatyard. It is one of the historical harbours of Fuvahmulah. Neregando indicates the close relationship between fishing and the villagers of Dhadimagu as well as the close affinity they have towards the Boat-building industry. Today even, Neregando is an active boatyard of Fuvahmulah.

== Places of interest ==
- Thoondu: A white sandy beach on the north of the island. It is a well known feature of Dhadimagu as well as that of the whole Fuvahmulah. Hundreds of people visit this beach every day, and this figure is higher on special occasions like Maahibun.
- Dhadimagi Kilhi: One among the two fresh water lakes in Fuvahmulah. Found in the center of the district.
- Gemmiskiy: The oldest mosque in the Maldives built c. 1300. In the pre-Islamic period it was a part of the Buddhist monastery and later was the first mosque to be built after the whole island converted to Islam.
- The Havitta: An ancient ruin of possibly a Buddhist stupa. Located within the historical boundaries of the district.
- Madharusathuh-Sheikh Mohammed Jamaaluhdeen: One of the four primary schools in Fuvahmulah. This school has been a successful primary school throughout the years.
- Ula pre-school: One of the pre-schools (Kindergartens) in Fuvahmulah.
- Dhanbo Baal (Dhanvah Baal): A dense vegetation of Syzygium cumini (Jambul) locally known as Dhanvah associated with the Dhadimagi Kilhi. Wood from the trees durable in water and resistant to termites were used for boat building as well as for construction purposes in the past. Not only the islanders benefited from it, but was also exported to the neighboring atolls. This plant variety is nearly extinct elsewhere in the Maldives.
- Dhadimagu Fannu: An iconic feature of Dhadimago, used for recreational purposes. This figure is much higher in occasions like Eid. For Eid celebrations this place stands out in Fuvahmulah history.
- Neregando: A famous anchorage of Fuvahmulah and a traditional harbour. It is a landmark of the boat-building industry of the island.

== Notables ==
- Ibrahim Nasir: Prime Minister of The Maldives (1958–68), President of the Maldives (1968–78)
- Ustaz Mohamed Rasheed Ibrahim: Current President of the Islamic Fiqh Academy of the Maldives. Former Chief Justice and President of Supreme Council for Islamic Affairs in the Maldives.
- Dr. Mohamed Zahir Hussain: Former Minister of Education and later Minister of Youth and Sports, Founder of Haveeru Daily. Current Chancellor of the Maldives National University.
- Mr. Ibrahim Rafeeq: Former Minister of Planning and Urban Development.
- Mr Mohamed Ahmed: Former Minister of State for Defence and National Security.
- Mr. Mohamed Fahmy Hassan: Former Chairman of the Civil Service Commission.
- Mr. Abdullah Farouk Hassan: Famous writer in the Maldives. Filled high government posts such as the position of Commissioner of the Anti-corruption Board. Also, served as MP for Fuvahmulah in the People's Majlis. Currently is a member of the Advisory Board of National Archives. Farouk is also a winner of National Award of Excellence for Outstanding Service in the field of Translation to Maldivian language.
- Dr. Ali Rafeeq: Former Editor in Chief of Haveeru Daily and Haveeru Online. Also, founder of Haveeru Online and Winner of National Award of Excellence for Outstanding Service in the field of Journalism.
- Dr. Mauroof Hussain: Famous ENT Doctor in the Maldives and Vice President of Adhaalath Party.
- Dr. Khaulath Mohamed (1973-2013) the first female of the island who received PhD. She did her PhD in political science in the University of Manchester
- Ali Shah:Current MP for Fuvahmulah in the People's Majlis
- Al-Sheikh Moosa Anwar Hassan: Member of Islamic Fiqh Academy of the Maldives and Spokesperson of the Ministry of Islamic Affairs.
- Mr. Ahmed Mohamed Didi: Director of Human Resources, Board of Directors and Management, Dhiraagu.
- An-Naib As-Shaikh Ibrahim Saeed: Famous writer and scholar. Served as Chief Judge of Fuvahmulah. Also served as a Member of Fuvahmulah Atoll Committee and as a member of National Council on Mosques.
- Dr. Nasreena Waheed: First Maldivian to acquire a professional doctorate in Public Health. Received multiple awards including President's Award for academic excellence (First place from a foreign university).

=== Notables from history ===
- Al-Faqeeh Muhammad Edurukaleygefaanu (Kokkiri Edurukaleygefaanu): One of the most famous Islamic Scholars in the country during his time. A student of Vaadhoo Dhannakaleygefaanu.
- Don Sitti Boo (Vaimatthe Don Sitti): Atoll Chief of Fuvahmulah appointed by Sultana Khadijah of the Maldives. Don Sitti Boo is the first female Atoll Chief of a Maldivian Atoll.
- Dhadofeeshe Ali Thakkhan: Son of Al-Faqeeh Muhammad Edurukaleygefaanu.
- Maigey Muhammad Thakkhan: Son of Dhadofeeshe Ali Thakkhan and direct ancestor of Chief Justice Muhammad Jamaaluddin (Naibu Thutthu) and famous poet Ali Mustafa (Faananmagu Mustafa).
- Nayaagey Aisha Didi: Mother of President Ibrahim Nasir.
- Dhadimagigey Hawwa Faan: Maternal grandmother of President Ibrahim Nasir.
- Dhadimagu Ganduvaru Moosa Didi: Maternal grandfather of President Ibrahim Nasir.
- Dhadimagu Ganduvaru Mariyam Didi: Maternal great-grandmother of President Ibrahim Nasir. Great-granddaughter of Ibrahim Faamuladeyri Kilegefan, son of Sultan Muhammed Ghiya'as ud-din of the Maldives.
- Miskihdhoregey Ahmed Khateeb Thakurufan (Dhon Thakkhan): Maternal great-grandfather of President Ibrahim Nasir.
- Maalhosgedharu Hawwa Manikfan: Mother of Dhadimagu Ganduvaru Mariyam Didi.
- Dhadimagigey Hussain Khateeb Thakurufan: Father of Miskihdhoregey Ahmed Khateeb Thakurufan.
- Olhoginaigey Aishah Didi: Maternal great-grandmother of Ustaz Mohamed Rasheed Ibrahim. She is a descendant of Maryam Kabafa'anu daughter of Sultan Ibrahim Iskandar II.
- Vaaru Hassan Thakkhan: A former Atoll Chief of Fuvahmulah.
- Beyrefeeshe Don Faatin: Among the well-educated women.
- Miskihdhoregey Aminah: Among the well-educated women.
- Finivaagey Ali Moosa Didi: A former Atoll Chief of Fuvahmulah.
- Reki Didi (Abdullah Mufeed): A member of Atoll Committee and a scholar of specially Arabic and Urdu languages.
- Dr. Khaulath Mohamed: First lady to acquire a PhD from Fuvahmulah.
- Al-Hafiz Ali Shafeeq: A commemorated learned Hafiz from Fuvahmulah on whose memory a Qur'an competition was held every year among school children.
