= Miskiymagu =

Administrative division in the Maldives

Coordinates: 0°17′53″S 73°25′29″E

Miskiymagu is an administrative division of Fuvahmulah, Maldives. The former Dhashokubaa village was merged with Miskimmago.

== Economy ==
Agriculture and Fishing along with white-collar jobs are the primary sources of income.

== Places of interest ==
- Algedaru Miskiy: One of the four oldest mosques in Fuvahmulah.
- Gn. Atoll Education Center: The only secondary as well as Higher Secondary School in Fuvahmulah.
- Heraha Mago: The transverse street which cuts across this village houses the Fire and Rescue Service Building, the Local Market and many of the businesses. Mānere anchorage can be found at the southern tip of the street. About three-fourths of the Heraha mago is within Miskiymago and the remaining one-fourth is within Maalegan ward to the north-east of the district.
- Mānere: A historical harbour (anchorage) of Fuvahmulah. This anchorage is used in the NE monsoon season (Iruvai).
- Bandaara Kilhi: One of the two fresh water lakes in Fuvahmulah. About one-fourth of the lake (a segmental part) is located in Miskiymago.
- The Local Market: All agricultural products as well as traditional food varieties of Fuvahmulah can be bought here.
- The Fire and Rescue Service Building
- Kids House: One of the preschools or kindergartens in Fuvahmulah.

== Notables ==
- Dr. Ahmed Jamsheed Mohamed: The current Minister of Health of the Maldives.
- Mohamed Waheed: Former member of parliament of Fuvahmulah.
- Ali Fazad: Incumbent President of Fuvahmulah Atoll Council.

=== Notables from history ===
- Miskiymagu Edhuruge Maryam Manikfan: Wife of Ibrahim Faamuladeyri Kilegefan, son of Sultan Muhammed Ghiya'as ud-din of the Maldives.
- Berimagu Aminath Didi (Berimagu Didi): Daughter of Ibrahim Faamuladeyri Kilegefan, son of Sultan Muhammed Ghiya'as ud-din of the Maldives.
- Randhuvaru Mohamed Didi
- Randhuvaru Reki Didi
