= Maalegan =

Administrative division of Fuvahmulah, Maldives

- Village
- Seat: Fuvahmulah Central Constituency

Government
  - Type: Local council
  - Body: Maalegan Council
  - President of Council: Ali Saeed

Population
  - Estimate: 1,500

Maalegan is an administrative division of Fuvahmulah, Maldives. This ward stretches along the island fringe facing the northeast sharing borders with Mādhado, Miskimmago, Funādo and Dūndigan.

== Places of interest ==
- Bandaara Kilhi: One of the two freshwater lakes in Fuvahmulah. The largest share of the lake (about three-fourths of the whole) is within Maalegan.
- Rasgefanno: Previously, the most famous anchorage of the island.
- Hukuru Miskih: One of the oldest mosques in the island.
- Zikura International College: One of college in Fuvahmulah.
