= Dhiguvaandu =

Administrative division of Fuvahmulah, Maldives

Dhiguvaandu is an administrative division of Fuvahmulah, Maldives. It is one of the largest districts in Fuvahmulah located just after Dhadimago. Apart from Dhadimago, the district also share borders with Hōdhado and Mādhado.

== Economy ==
Most residents of Diguvāndo rely heavily on white collar jobs for income. Apart from this, retail business is also a main source of income. Perhaps the most prominent feature of this district is the "Chas bin" (an area of wet land) associated with the Dhadimagi-Kilhi. Huge amounts of Taro fields can be found in the wet land area. Vast amounts of Areca nut can be found around the district. Mango and Breadfruit also can be found in a reasonable quantity. Almost every house in the district have a Mango tree despite a few houses built recently.

== Places of interest ==
- Ahmed Ali Didi Cricket Ground: Hosted the SAARC Twenty20 Cricket Tournament 2011 which was the first ever international event to be hosted outside the capital Male in the Maldives.
- The Wathaniya communications antenna: It's located in the Aruffanno Mago and Mohammed Jamaaluddin Naibu Thutthu Mago junction and is the tallest structure in the Maldives, along with the Dhiraagu Communications antenna in the island. Both structures stand 400 feet tall.
- Aruffanno: A traditional harbour (anchorage) of the island.
- A minor part of Madharusathu-Sheikh Mohammed Jamaaluddin (one of the three primary schools in the island) is located within Diguvāndo.
- A significant part of the marsh land area associated with the Dhadimagi Kilhi.

== Notables ==
- Mohamed Jamaaluddin Naibu Thuthu: The famous Poet laureate and Chief Justice of the Maldives. Naibu Thuthu is the most famous personality to-date from this district.
- Gnaviyani Ali Shareef: Famous poet who won the National Award of Excellence for Outstanding Service in the field of poetry.
- Mohamed Rafeeq Hassan: Former Member of Parliament for the North Constituency of Fuvahmulah consisting of Dhadimago, Dhiguvaando and Hoadhado wards.

=== Notables from history ===
- Elhathoshigey Isa Naib Thakurufan.
- Elhathoshigey Muhammad Thakurufan
- Malga'di Aminah Manikfan
- Malga'di Thakkhan
- Dhigalagedharu Aminah Manikfan
