= Maldives United Opposition =

Maldivian political coalition (2016–2018)

- Abbreviation: MUO
- Leader: Mohamed Jameel Ahmed
- Founded: 1 June 2016
- Dissolved: September 2018

Website
- maldivesunitedopposition.com (archived)

The Maldives United Opposition was a Maldivian political coalition consisting of political parties with different political ideologies. It was established in June 2016 with the goal of removing president Abdulla Yameen. It was dissolved in 2018, after Yameen lost the 2018 presidential election.

== History ==
In London, rival opposition groups of the government, the Maldivian Democratic Party (MDP), Adhaalath Party (AP), as well as former deputies of president Abdulla Yameen's cabinet, as well as former defence minister Mohamed Nazim, formed the Maldives United Opposition. The party established Mohamed Jameel Ahmed as the leader of the party.

=== Rallies and protests ===
==== First rally ====
In 2016, the Ministry of Housing and Infrastructure originally granted MDP a permit to hold a rally in Malé, but later withdrew it, the minister Mohamed Muizzu saying that it was granted to MDP and not "some group called the united coalition". The MUO later rescheduled the rally to the 21st, but later cancelled due to bad weather. Opposition MP Ahmed Mahloof and others were arrested for promoting the rally using a megaphone on a parked pickup truck. The rally took place at the MDP meeting hall and thousands of supporters came. Riot police was blocking Majeedhee Magu and pushing people onto the pavement. Many were arrested including Ahmed Mahloof, and foreigners.

MUO has seen low turnout at its later rallies, MUO spokesman Ali Zahir saying that the people are scared to come out.

==== Surprise protest ====
On 31 August 2016, hundreds of protesters marched with raincoats in Malé, demanding the resignation of Abdulla Yameen as president of the Maldives. Riot police soon arrived and pepper sprayed the crowd and dispersed the gathering.

=== Shadow cabinet ===
MUO wanted the government of Abdulla Yameen to resign and to form an interim government. So, MUO created a shadow cabinet, so when Abdulla Yameen's government resigns, MUO's shadow cabinet will take over as the interim government.

The following shows the shadow cabinet members and their positions:

Name	Position
Mohamed Jameel Ahmed	Leader of the Maldives United Opposition
Ali Waheed	Deputy Leader of the Maldives United Opposition
Abdulla Ameen	Shadow Minister of Defence and National Security
Mohamed Shihab	Shadow Minister of Finance and Treasury
Ahmed Thasmeen Ali	Shadow Minister of Home Affairs
Ahmed Naseem	Shadow Minister of Foreign Affairs
Adam Azim	Shadow Minister of Trade and Transport
Mohamed Aslam	Shadow Minister of Environment, Clean Energy, and Waste Management
Hisaan Hussain	Shadow Minister of Judicial Reform
Ahmed Nasheed	Shadow Minister of Housing and Infrastructure
Shifa Mohamed	Shadow Minister of Education
Mustafa Lutfi	Shadow Minister of Higher Education
Mohamed Shifaz	Shadow Minister of Youth and Sports
Abdul Majeed Abdul Bari	Shadow Minister of Islamic Affairs
Hassan Latheef	Shadow Minister of Civil Rights
Gais Naseer	Shadow Minister of Local Government and Decentralisation
Ibrahim Ameer	Shadow Minister of International Financial Agreements, Fisheries and Agriculture
Shidhatha Shareef	Shadow Minister of Health, Social Protection and Gender
Mohamed Maleeh Jamal	Shadow Minister of Resort & Guesthouse Tourism
Ali Niyaz	Shadow Minister of Elections Commission & Independent Institutions Reform
Hussain Shameem	Shadow Minister of Constitutional Reform
Ahmed Mahloof	Spokesperson for the United Opposition

=== 2018 presidential election ===
After Mohamed Nasheed withdrew his candidacy for president, the MOU agreed on Ibrahim Mohamed Solih. MDP's presidential ticket was given to Solih.

== Member parties ==
- Maldivian Democratic Party
- Adhaalath Party
- Jumhooree Party
- Maldives Reform Movement
