= 2026 Malé City mayoral election =

Mayoral election in Malé

- 4 April 2026
- Turnout: 56.45%
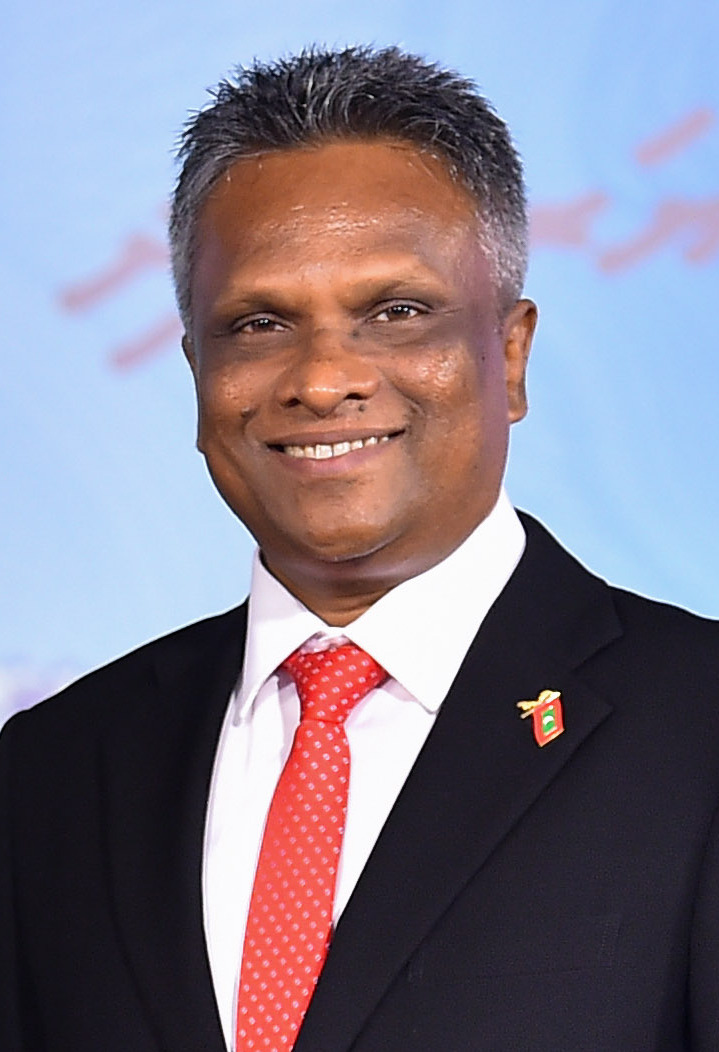

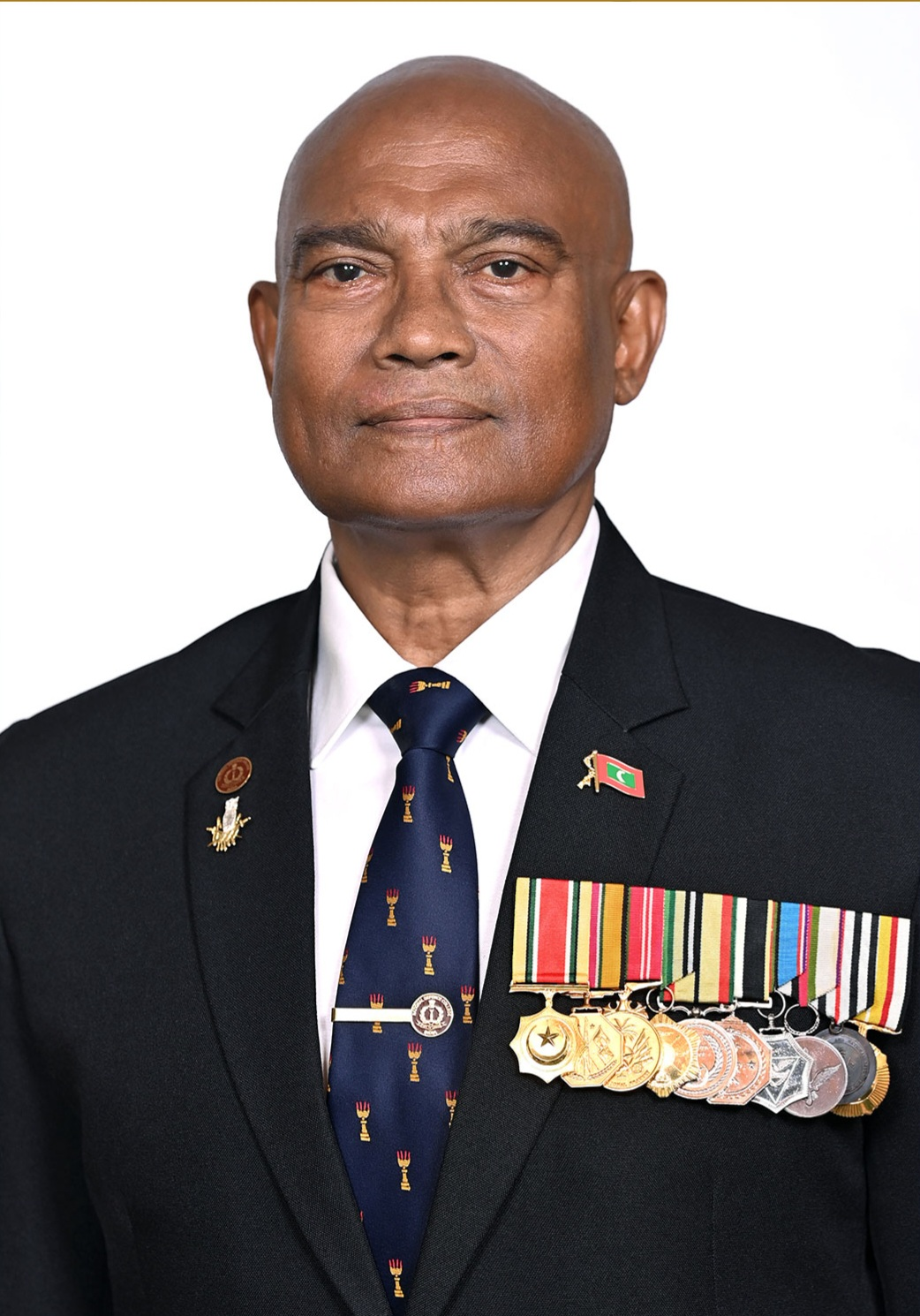
Nominee	Adam Azim	Moosa Ali Jaleel
Party	MDP	PNC
Popular vote	13,820	9,279
Percentage	45.14%	30.39%
Mayor before election
Adam Azim
MDP
Elected Mayor
Adam Azim
MDP

The Malé City mayoral election took place on 4 April 2026, alongside the Maldives’ local council elections and a constitutional referendum. Incumbent Mayor Adam Azim of the Maldivian Democratic Party won re-election for a second term, defeating four challengers. Voter turnout was around 56% of the 58,169 registered voters in Malé, a big jump from the roughly 32% turnout in the January 2024 by-election.

== Background ==
Malé City is the capital of the Maldives and its municipal government is headed by an elected mayor. The Malé City Council consists of the mayor and deputy mayor plus 16 ward councilors. Under the country’s decentralization laws, mayors serve five-year terms. Azim first won the Malé mayoralty in a January 2024 by-election (after then-mayor Mohamed Muizzu resigned).

In past local elections, Malé’s council was contested alongside other atoll councils. In the January 2024 by-election, Azim from the MDP led a three-candidate race with 42.6% of the vote (7,621 votes), beating the ruling party’s contender. The 2026 election, held alongside a major constitutional referendum, was viewed as a test of national politics, and the opposition MDP ended up winning all five city mayoral contests in Malé, Addu, Fuvahmulah, Kulhudhuffushi, and Thinadhoo.

== Date, legal framework, and electoral system ==
On 4 December 2025, the Elections Commission announced that the Local Council Elections, covering city mayors and island councils, would take place on 4 April 2026. Held under the Local Council Elections regulations and the Decentralization Act, these elections allow for the direct election of city mayors and councilors to five-year terms. Malé City, with 58,169 eligible voters, was the only city in the Maldives, with its mayor elected through a city-wide vote. In Malé, each voter casts a single vote for mayor, and the candidate with the most votes wins since there’s no runoff in the Maldives’ local elections. Campaigning follows electoral laws and wraps up at 6:00 PM the day before the vote. No public opinion polls were conducted for the mayoral race.

== Candidates ==
Five candidates ran in the 2026 Malé mayoral race. (The main ward council seats were also up for election at the same time, but this article focuses only on the mayoral contest.) The candidates, along with their party affiliations and backgrounds, were:

- Adam Azim – Maldivian Democratic Party (MDP): Incumbent mayor (elected Jan 2024) and former executive in state firms (ex-CEO of MTCC and STO), Azim, 53, ran for re-election on the MDP ticket.
- Moosa Ali Jaleel – People’s National Congress (PNC): Retired Major General and former Defence Minister, Jaleel, 65, is a decorated veteran (serving as CDF 2008–12 and Minister of Defence in 2015).
- Ismail Zariyand – Independent (backed by the People’s National Front, PNF): Zariyand, 58, is a former national football team goalkeeper and long-serving state auditor. In December 2025 the newly formed PNF (led by ex-President Abdulla Yameen) announced Zariyand as its mayoral candidate. He campaigned on a platform of legal accountability for the city council, combating corruption, and improving city services within the council’s authority.
- Ahmed Aiham Mohamed – Independent: Aiham, 27, is a youth activist, community organizer and former journalist active in NGOs (including youth and environmental movements). Running as a non-partisan candidate (unable to get a major party ticket), he advocated “smart city” urban-planning reforms: traffic light optimization, better public transport and parking, more green spaces, and greater transparency and citizen participation.
- Abdulla Mahzoom Majid – Maldives Development Alliance (MDA): Mahzoom Majid is an LLB-trained lawyer and youth politician who formerly served as Deputy Minister (later suspended) in government. He had been active in student protests and youth movements; in 2025 he gained attention as a leader of the Dhuleh Nukuraanan protest. He ran under the MDA banner (a small registered party) focusing on youth and justice issues.

== Campaign ==
The campaign stayed mostly low-key aside from party rallies, with main topics centering on urban infrastructure, governance, and the city’s ties to the national government. Azim pointed to his track record as mayor on infrastructure and flood control, though he offered few new pledges. Jaleel focused on aligning with President Muizzu’s development plans—like land reclamation and dredging—and promised results through “diligence and sincerity,” prioritizing housing, road upgrades, and foreign labor concerns. Zariyand vowed not to promise beyond the city council’s powers, aiming to audit past unlawful decisions and ensure fair access to services; he was formally endorsed by former President Yameen, who praised Zariyand’s integrity. Aiham, the independent candidate, campaigned on a non-partisan, “smart city” agenda: installing dynamic traffic lights, bike lanes and parking solutions, increasing green spaces, and enhancing transparency and public participation. The MDA’s Mahzoom Majid campaigned on youth and justice issues (e.g. accountability), but drew little media attention.

== Results ==
Party	Votes	%
Maldivian Democratic Party	13,875	45.14
People's National Congress	9,341	30.39
Independent	6,290	20.46
Independent	886	2.88
Maldives Development Alliance	348	1.13
Total	30,740	100.00
Valid votes	30,740	93.77
Invalid/blank votes	2,042	6.23
Total votes	32,782	100.00
Registered voters/turnout	58,169	56.36

Adam Azim won by a clear margin, taking roughly 45% of valid votes. Jaleel (PNC) finished second with about 30%. Notably, independent Zariyand surpassed Jaleel in early counts but ultimately trailed by about 10 points.

The turnout (32,665 votes cast of 58,169 registered) was ~56%. (For comparison, turnout in the 2024 by-election had been only 31.8%.

== Aftermath and reactions ==
Mayor Azim’s re-election was confirmed early on election night. Within hours, President Muizzu congratulated Azim and other winning candidates and publicly accepted the election results.

The defeated candidates conceded: Zariyand issued a statement congratulating Azim, noting that he had run a lawful campaign.

Azim celebrated with party supporters at Malé’s Artificial Beach, along with winners of the city council seats.

The outcome was widely seen as a setback for the ruling PNC government. The opposition MDP’s clean sweep of all five city mayoralties was reported as a “huge blow” to the government. No significant legal challenges were raised against the Malé mayoral result. Azim announced plans to continue his policy programs (e.g. flood control and city services improvements), pledging to cooperate with central authorities. He retained his incumbent deputy and worked with the newly elected Malé councillors (of which the MDP won a majority) to organize the city government.

== Significance ==
The 2026 Malé mayoral election carried weight both locally and nationally. On the local front, it confirmed Adam Azim’s mandate to serve out his five-year term and handed the MDP control over Malé’s municipal government. Nationally, paired with the concurrent referendum loss, it showed strong opposition voter turnout, with state media and analysts noting the MDP “won mayoral seats in all five cities.” Many saw the result as a mid-term slap at President Muizzu’s PNC administration. The high turnout in Malé—almost twice that of the 2024 by-election—suggested voters were energized by the stakes. In the days after, commentators pointed out that Malé’s outcome mirrored other urban MDP wins, hinting at ongoing opposition momentum heading into future national contests.
