= Fathimath Shamnaz =

Maldivian politician

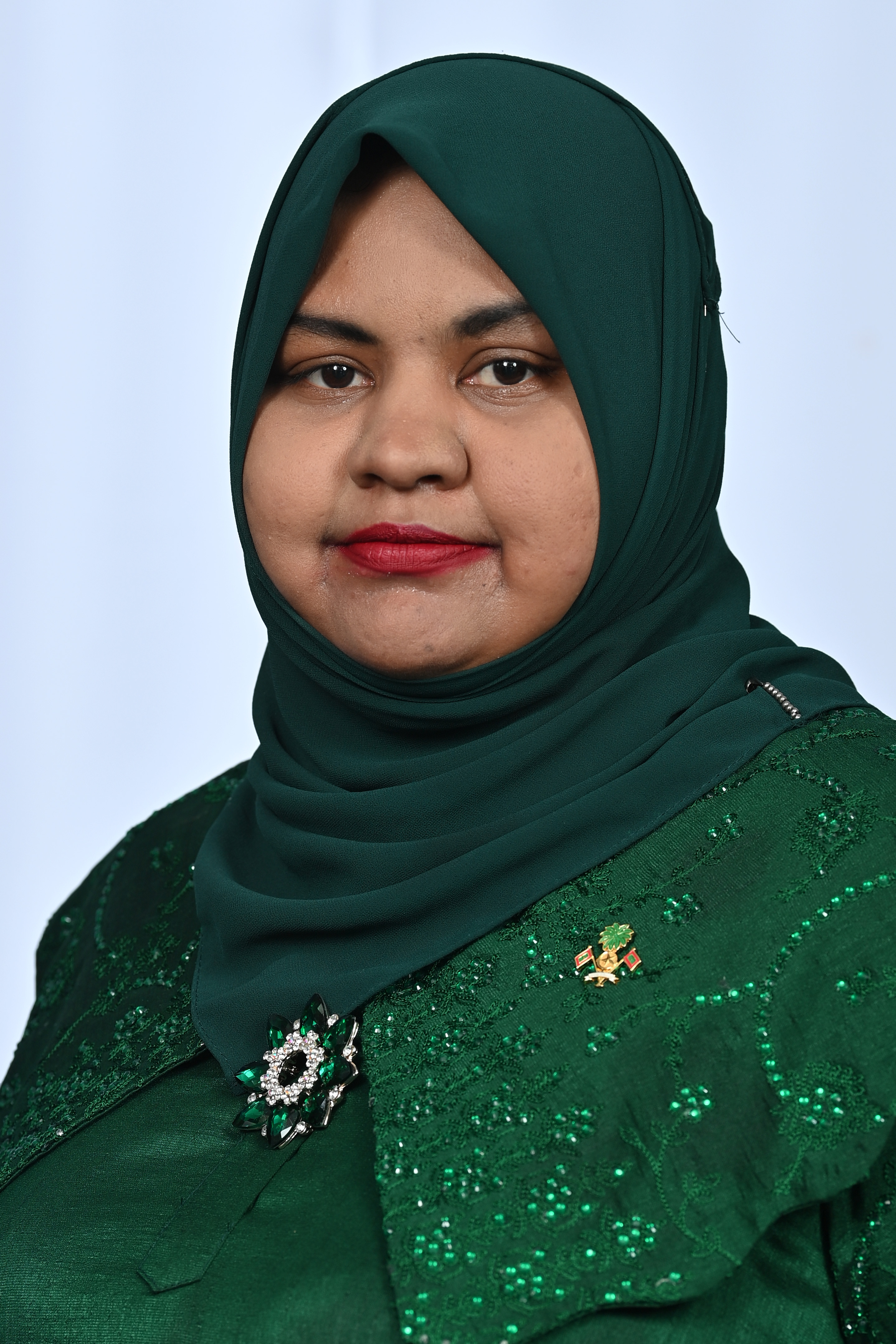
- Official portrait, 2023

Minister of State for Climate Change, Environment and Energy
- In office 17 November 2023 – 28 June 2024
- President: Mohamed Muizzu
- Preceded by: (Ministry created)
- Succeeded by: Ibrahim Mimrah

Personal details
- Born: Fathimath Shamnaz Ali Saleem

Fathimath Shamnaz Ali Saleem is a Maldivian politician who briefly served as the Minister of State for Climate Change, Environment and Energy.

== Alleged sorcery ==
On 28 June 2024, she was arrested for allegedly performing black magic on President Mohamed Muizzu. After she was arrested, her and her former husband, Adam Rameez, was suspended from their roles. On 13 July 2024, she was released from custody.
