= Muizzu (disambiguation) =

Mohamed Muizzu (born 1978) is a Maldivian politician and president of the Maldives.

Muizzu may also refer to :

- Dr. Mohamed Muizzu, a book written by Mohamed Muizzu about his remarks during the presidential election
- Family of Mohamed Muizzu, family members of Mohamed Muizzu
