= Family of Mohamed Muizzu =

List of members of the family of Mohamed Muizzu

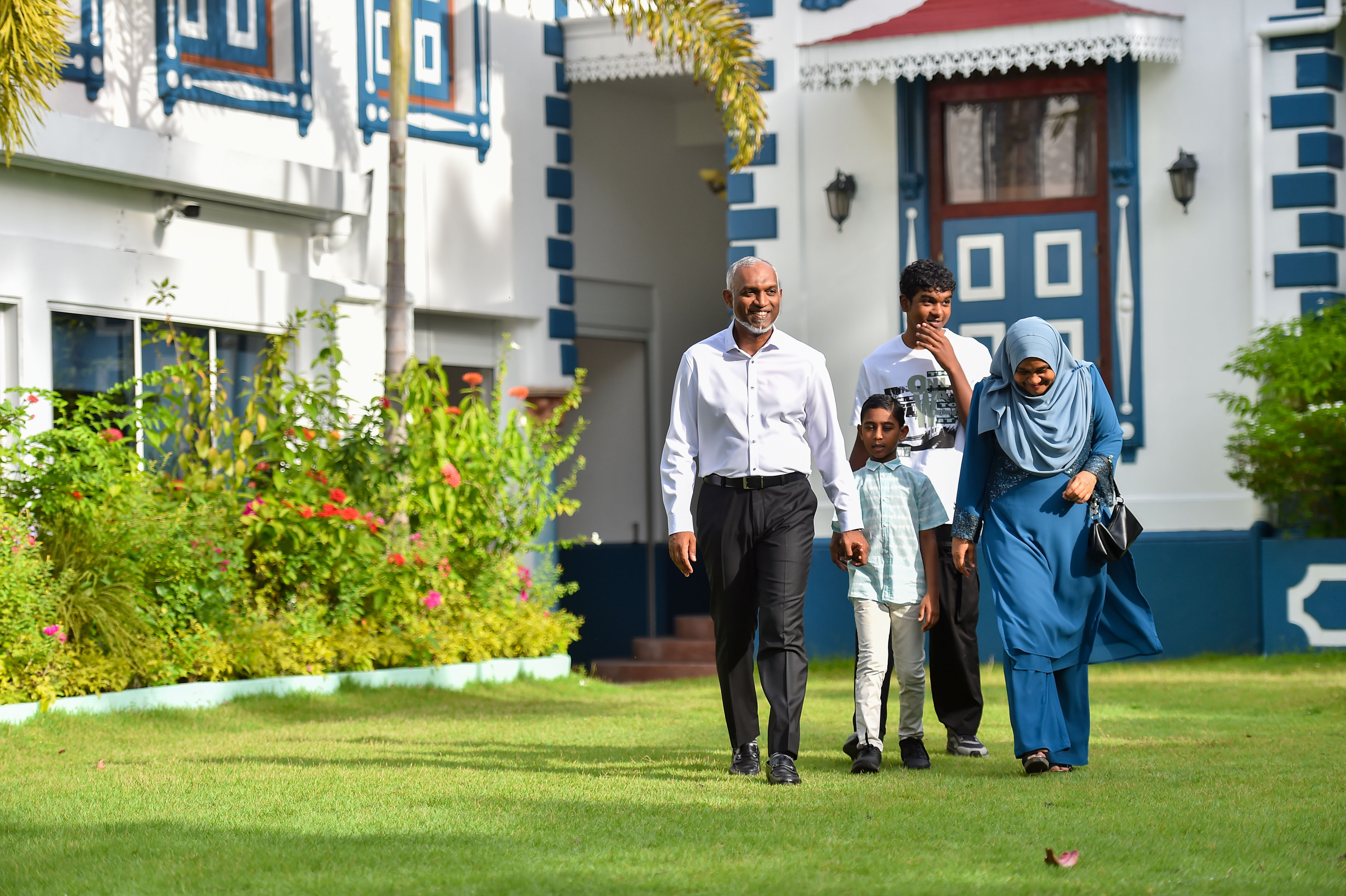
- L–R: Muizzu, Zaid, Umair, Sajidha in August 2024
- Current region: Maldives (Malé)
- Origin: Vasshafaru, Haa Alif Atoll; Malé, Kaafu Atoll
- Members: Mohamed Muizzu; Sajidha Mohamed; Yasmine Mohamed Muizzu; Umyr Mohamed Muizzu; Zaid Mohamed Muizzu; –––: Hussain Abdul Rahman; Husna Adam

The family of Mohamed Muizzu, the 8th and current president of the Maldives is a Maldivian descended family. They are active in law, education, activism and politics. The immediate family of Mohamed Muizzu is the current first family of the Maldives since his inauguration on November 17, 2023.

Mohamed Muizzu was the longest serving housing minister in the Maldivian history. He was the Mayor of Malé until his resignation following his inauguration as the president of the Maldives.

== Immediate family ==
=== Sajidha Mohamed ===
Sajidha Mohamed (Dhivehi: ސާޖިދާ މުޙައްމަދު; born August 6, 1978) commonly known as Saaji, is a Maldivian Civil Servant and the current first lady of the Maldives since 2023. She is the wife of president Mohamed Muizzu. Sajidha Mohamed is a graduate of University of Leeds and a university in Bangalore. she got a Master's degree in Leeds University and a Bachelor's degree in Bangalore in 2003.

Sajidha actively campaigned for her husband's presidential election in 2023. During the campaign, Sajidha delivered many speeches to introduce her husband for the Nation.

As the first lady of the Maldives, Sajidha delivered a video message at the 9th International Day of Women and Girls in Science Assembly on February 12, 2024.

=== Yasmine Mohamed Muizzu ===
Yasmine Mohamed Muizzu (Dhivehi: ޔާސްމީނު މުޙައްމަދު މުޢިއްޒު; born 2004) is the eldest and the only daughter of Mohamed Muizzu and Sajidha Mohamed.

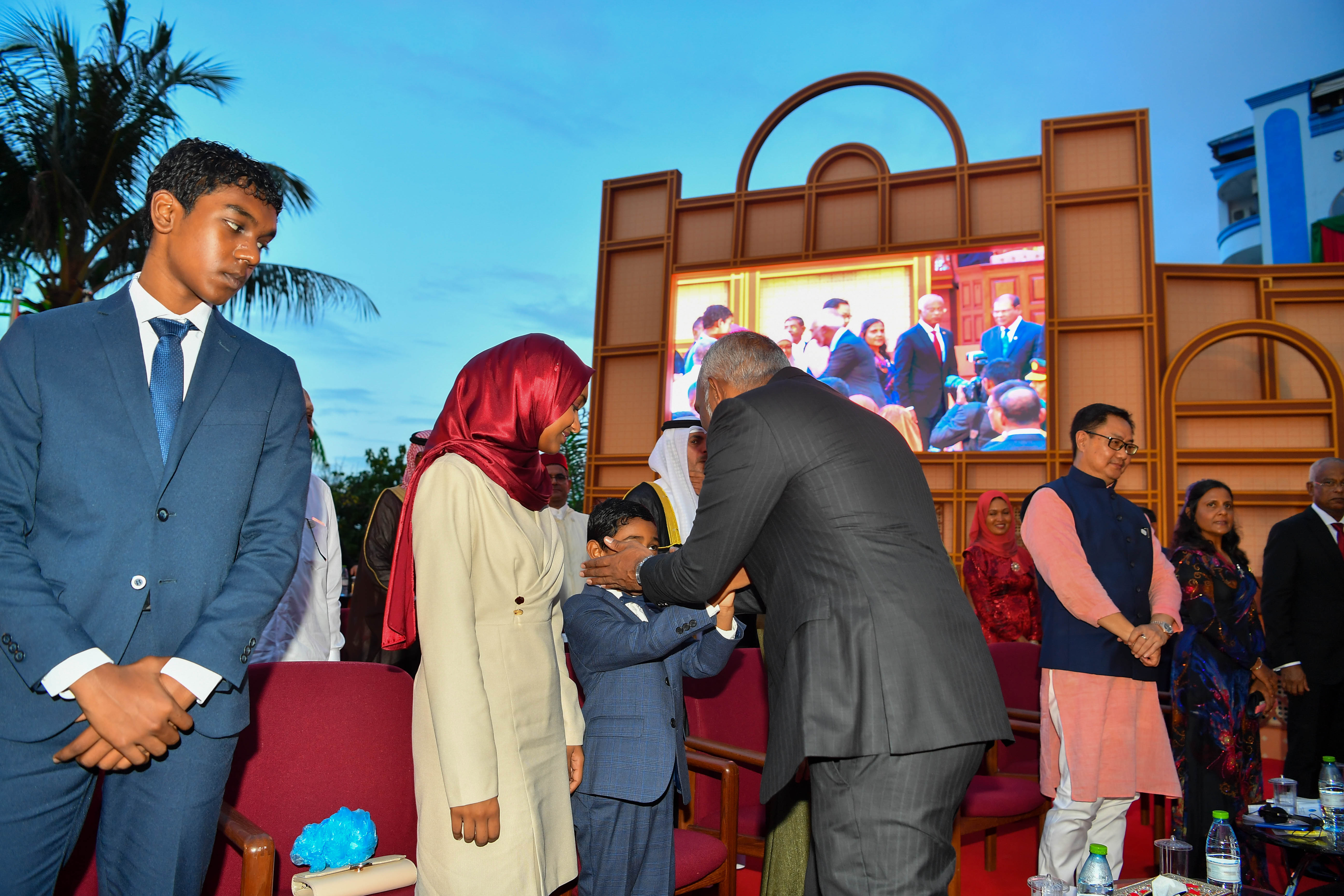
Umair, Yasmine and Zaid with Muizzu seen during his inauguration.

=== Umair Mohamed Muizzu ===
Umair Mohamed Muizzu (Dhivehi: އުމައިރު މުހައްމަދު މުއިއްޒު; born 2009; also known as Umyr) is one of the three children (the older of two sons) of president Mohamed Muizzu and his wife Sajidha Mohamed. Umair is the eldest son of his parents.

Umair was nominated as "Young Sportsman of the Year" in the 2025 Maldives Sports Awards. This prompted criticism as some claiming he only was nominated because he was the President's son.

=== Zaid Mohamed Muizzu ===
Zaid Mohamed Muizzu (Dhivehi: ޒައިދު މުހައްމަދު މުއިއްޒު; born 2016) is the youngest child (and the younger of two sons) of president Mohamed Muizzu and his wife, Sajidha Mohamed. Zaid, aged seven and his elder siblings Yasmine, aged 19 and Umair, aged 14 were present attending their father's inauguration in 2023.

== Maternal and paternal relations ==
=== Hussain Abdul Rahman ===
Hussain Abdul Rahman (c. 1942 – 28 September 2015) was a judge and scholar of religion in the Maldives. He is the Father of Mohamed Muizzu. Abdul Rahman was born in Vashafaru in 1944. He was presented the National Award of Honour in 2013 for "contribution in the area of religious awareness and religious education." Abdul Rahman died in Mecca on 29 September 2015.

=== Husna Adam ===
Husna Adam Ismail Manik is the mother of Mohamed Muizzu. She campaigned for her son's Presidential Election in 2023.

== Other Relations ==
=== Fathimath Saudha ===
Fathimath Saudha is the younger sister of President Mohamed Muizzu. she is the younger child of Husna Adam. Saudha is the daughter of Adam Abdul Rahman, Muizzu's stepfather. Saudha is a People's National Congress Member of Parliament for the Nilandhoo constituency.

=== Sajidha Mohamed's parents ===
Sajidha Mohamed's Father, Sheikh Mohamed Ibrahim was a scholar of religion in the Maldives. Sajidha's Mother is Habeeba Ali.

=== Brother of Sajidha Mohamed ===
Sheikh Abdullah Bin Mohamed, the brother of Sajidha Mohamed, is the brother-in-law of President Mohamed Muizzu. He serves as the President of Jamiyyath Salaf, a prominent religious organization in the Maldives known for its influence in Islamic affairs.

== Controversies ==
=== Allegations Related to Maid's Death ===
In December 2023, Dr. Muizzu's family faced public scrutiny following the tragic suicide of a domestic worker employed by them. Reports emerged speculating possible mistreatment. Dr. Muizzu's spouse, however, issued a public statement denying all allegations of mistreatment and clarified that the matter was under official investigation at the time. She emphasized the family’s cooperation with authorities to ensure transparency in the inquiry.

The incident drew media attention, sparking debates about the treatment of domestic workers in the Maldives and leading to broader discussions on labor rights and protections.

=== Allegations about vape ban due to Umair ===
In March 2025, Mariyam Zubair, also known as Mandhy, alleged at an opposition Maldivian Democratic Party (MDP) rally that Umair being caught vaping was the reason that vaping was banned in the country.

Soon after at a press conference, his mother, Saajidha Mohamed denied the allegations and along with the family's lawyer, Aishath Azima Shakoor announced their intention to file a civil lawsuit against MDP, Mariyam Zubair, and Fayyaz Ismail.
