= Order of Dhiyamigili Dynasty =

National honour in the Maldives

Order of the Dignified Rule of the Dhiyamigili Dynasty

Awarded by Maldives
- Type: Order
- Established: 2011
- Awarded for: Service for the government or the Maldives
- Status: Currently constituted
- Grades: Collar
- Post-nominals: NDSI

Statistics
- Total inductees: 6
- Ribbon bar

The Order of the Dignified Rule of the Dhiyamigili Dynasty (also known as the Nishaan Dhiyamigili Sharafge Izzaiy) is a national honour in the Maldives.

== History ==
The honour commemorates Sultan Muhammed Ghiya'as ud-din of Dhiyamigili dynasty.

== Recipients ==
| Recipient | Date | Ref |
|---|---|---|
| Mohamed Naseem | 2011 | |
| Habeeba Hussain Habeeb | 2011 | |
| Badru Naseer | 26 December 2020 | |
| Mustafa Lutfi | 26 July 2023 | |
| Adam Abdul Rahman | 24 August 2025 | |
| 'Kashima' Ahmed Shakir | 15 August 2026 | |
