= Sajidha Mohamed =

First lady of the Maldives since 2023

- ސާޖިދާ މުޙައްމަދު
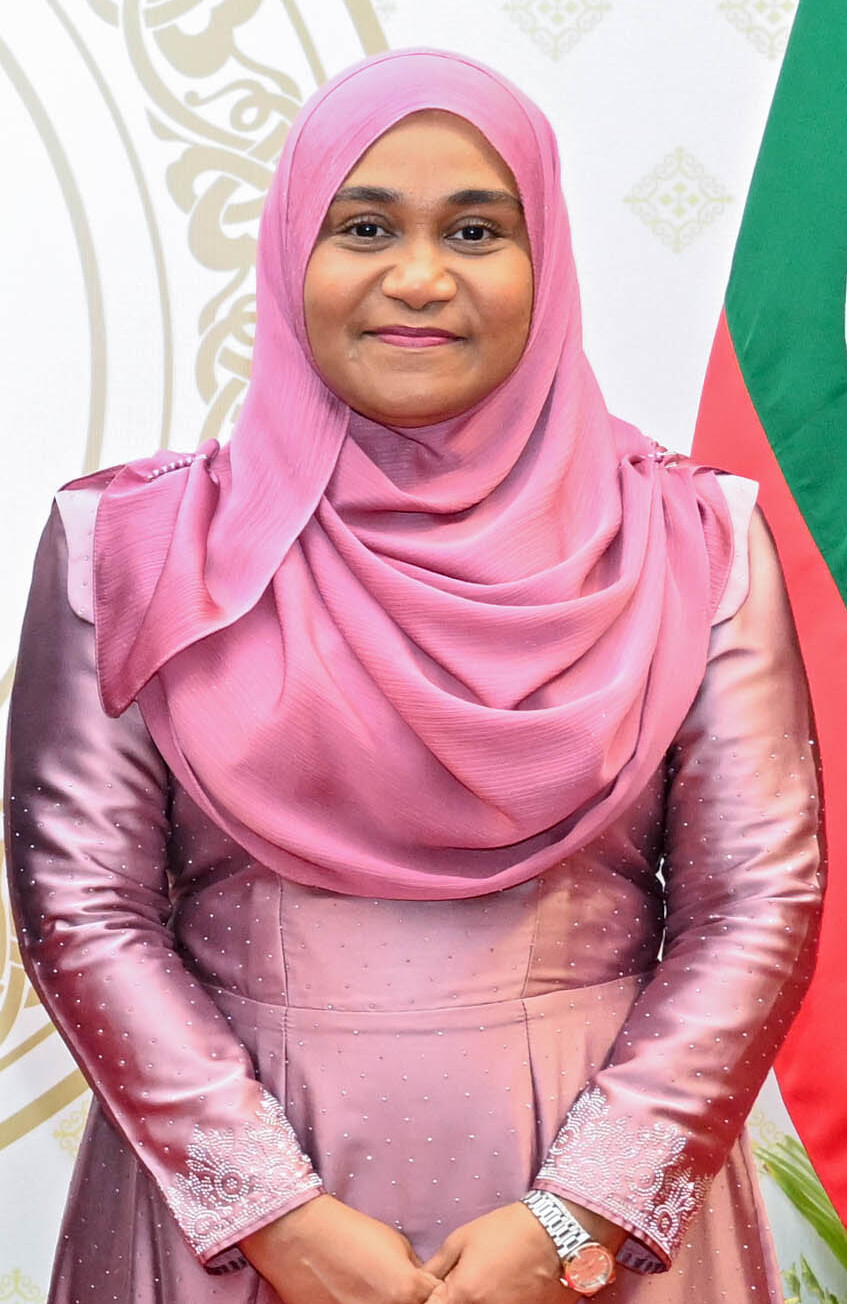
- Sajidha Mohamed in 2025

9th First Lady of the Maldives
- Incumbent
- Assumed office 17 November 2023
- President: Mohamed Muizzu
- Preceded by: Fazna Ahmed

Personal details
- Born: 6 August 1978 (age 48) Malé, Maldives
- Spouse: Mohamed Muizzu (m. 2003)
- Children: Yasmine; Umyr; Zaid
- Education: University of Leeds; St. Joseph's University

Sajidha Mohamed (/sɑːˈdʒiːdə/ saah-JEE-dah, Dhivehi: ސާޖިދާ މުޙައްމަދު; born 6 August 1978) is a Maldivian civil servant and the current first lady of the Maldives since 2023 as the wife of President Mohamed Muizzu.

Born on Malé, Sajidha completed her master's degree at University of Leeds with her husband in the United Kingdom. She completed her bachelor's degree at St. Joseph's University in 2003. She worked as a civil servant at the Civil Service Commission of Maldives.

== Early life ==
=== Family, education and marriage ===
Sajidha Mohamed was born on 6 August 1978 to Sheikh Mohamed Ibrahim and Habeeba Ali at her parents' residence in Machchangolhi, Malé, Maldives. Sheikh Ibrahim was a well-known scholar of religion.

In 2003, she completed her bachelor's degree from St. Joseph's College, Bangalore, and a master's degree at the University of Leeds while with Muizzu in the United Kingdom.

In 2003, Sajidha met her future husband Mohamed Muizzu at the Ibrahim Nasir International Airport (Now Velana International Airport) after arriving from Bangalore. They married on 18 May 2003; they have three children, Yasmine, Umair and Zaid.

== First Lady of the Maldives ==
=== Actions ===
In December 2023, First Lady Sajidha inaugurated the Dhon Bandaarain Handh’aanee Mauraz, a special exhibition of artefacts connected to Dhon Bandaarain, to commemorate Huravee Day in the Maldives.

Sajidha unveiled the creation of an official logo for use by home-based food producers, on initiative of the Maldives Food and Drug Authority. This mark aims to increase public confidence in food safety by adherence to the standards of the MFDA, and to promote the domestic food industry.

=== Foreign visits ===
==== Turkey ====
On 26 November 2023, Sajidha and President Muizzu went on their first official visit to Turkey. First Lady of Turkey, Emine Erdoğan met Sajidha and congratulated her for Muizzu’s inauguration as Maldivian president on 17 November 2023 and on their first official visit to Turkey. During this meeting, Sajidha signed a declaration of "Global Commitment to Zero Waste for the World, Our Common Home", created by Emine Erdoğan to promote efficient resource use and recycling.

==== China ====
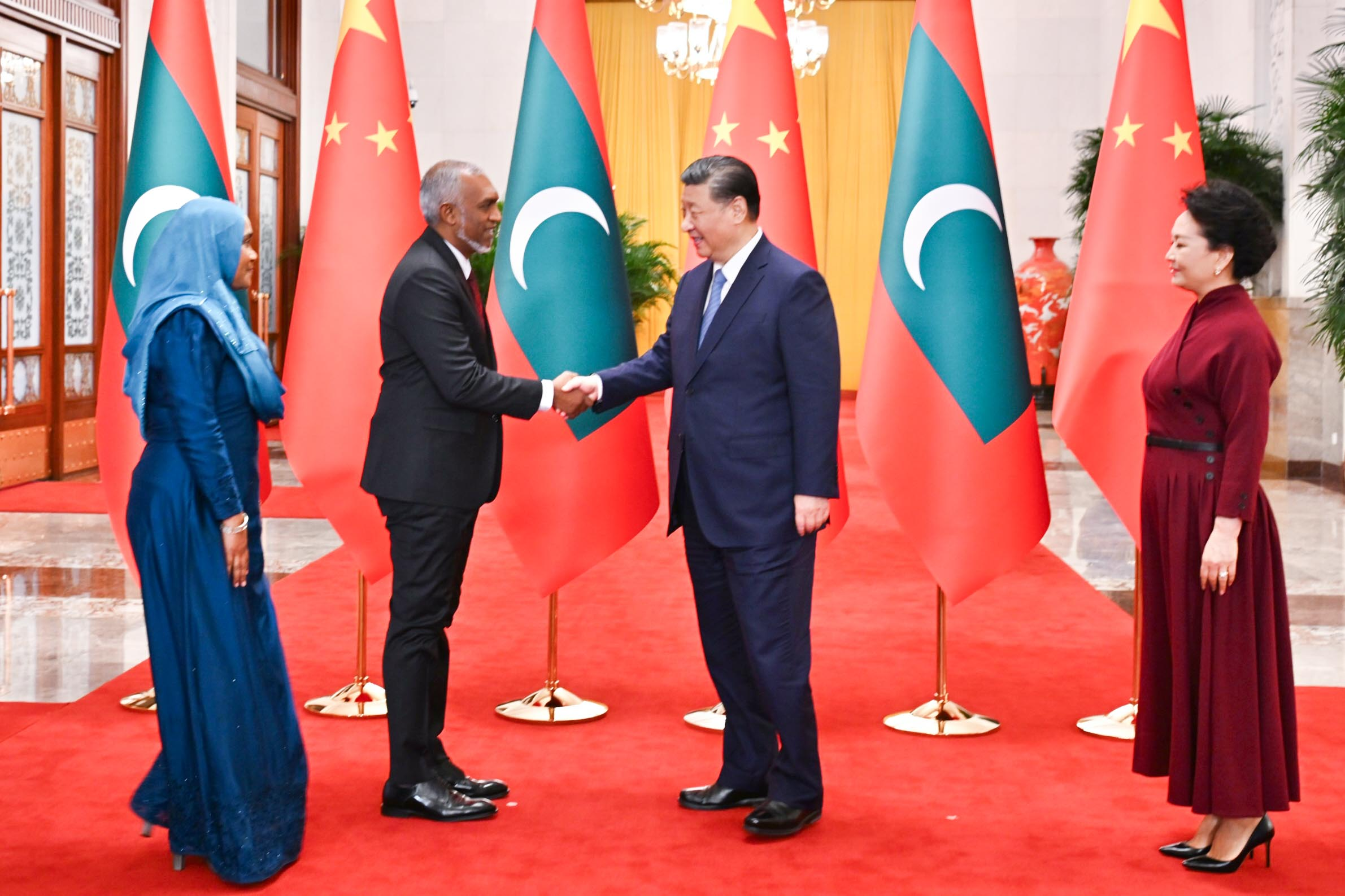
Muizzu shaking hands with Xi, while Sajidha is behind Muizzu and Peng is behind Xi.

On 7 January, Sajidha arrived in China on an invitation extended by CCP General Secretary Xi Jinping and First Lady Peng Liyuan.

Honorary titles
Preceded by Fazna Ahmed	First Lady of the Maldives; 2023–present	Current holder
