= Ahmed Nareesh =

Maldivian politician

- އަހުމަދު ނަރީޝް
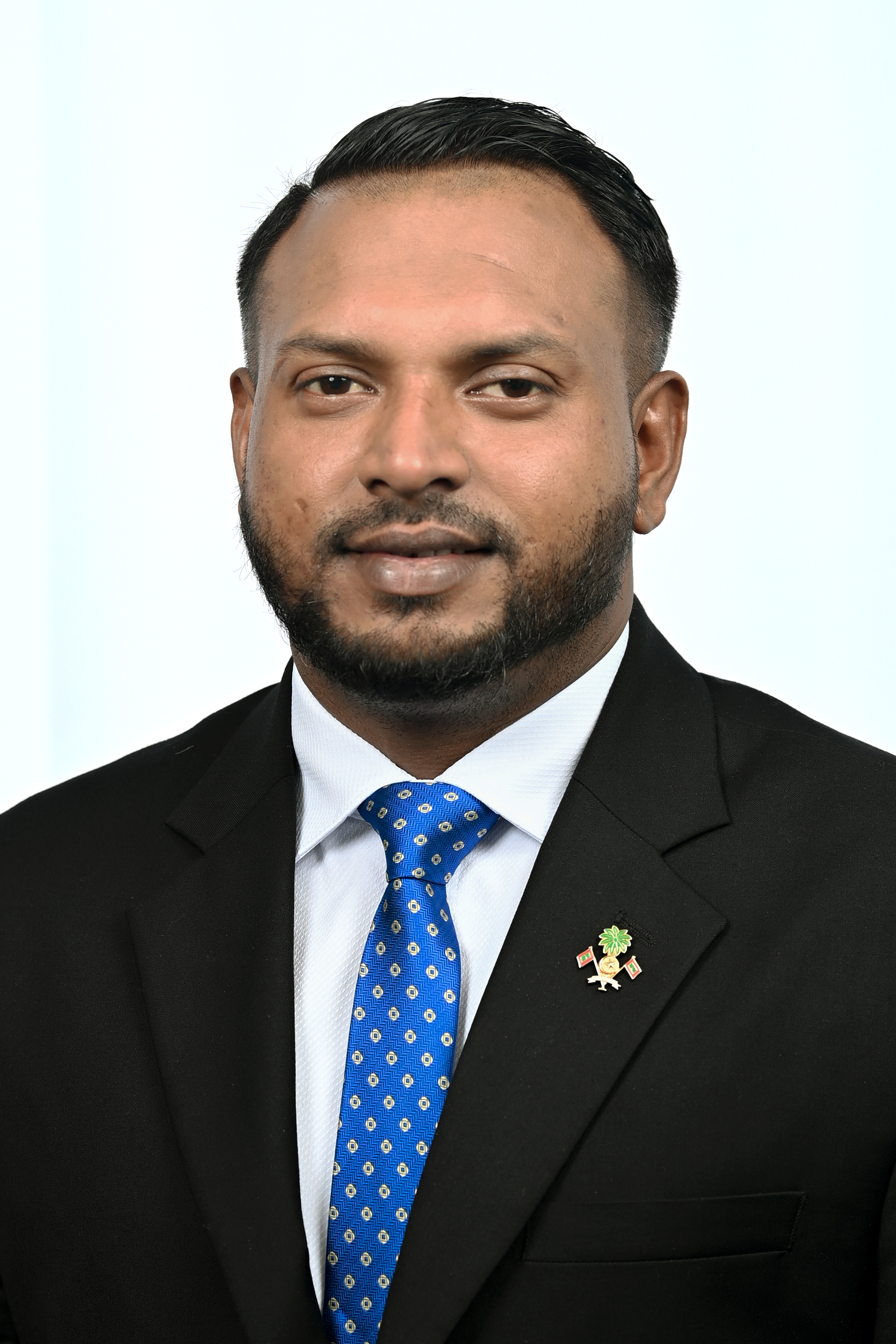
- Official portrait, 2025

Advisor to the Minister of Youth Empowerment, Information and Arts
- Incumbent
- Assumed office 16 March 2025
- President: Mohamed Muizzu

Deputy Mayor of Malé
- In office 21 June 2021 – 12 March 2025
- President: Ibrahim Mohamed Solih; Mohamed Muizzu
- Mayors: Mohamed Muizzu; Adam Azim
- Succeeded by: Mohamed Areesh

Mayor of Malé
- Acting
- In office 17 November 2023 – 22 January 2024
- President: Mohamed Muizzu
- Deputy: Himself, as he is serving both mayor and deputy mayor (interim)
- Preceded by: Mohamed Muizzu
- Succeeded by: Adam Azim

Personal details
- Born: 1988 (age 37–38) Kolamaafushi, Gaafu Alifu Atoll, Maldives
- Party: People's National Congress
- Other political affiliations: Progressive Party of Maldives

Ahmed Nareesh (Dhivehi: އަހުމަދު ނަރީޝް; born 1988) is a Maldivian politician who is currently serving as the Advisor to the Minister of Youth Empowerment, Information and Arts since 2025. He previously served as the Deputy Mayor of Malé, the capital city of the Maldives from 2021 to 2025. He was serving as the acting mayor, after the former mayor Mohamed Muizzu resigned on 17 November 2023. After the mayoral elections in 2024, Adam Azim became the new mayor.

== Career ==
Nareesh was a television presenter who hosted the Maldivian nightly programs Madiseela and Hajam on Channel 13 News.

Nareesh was elected as the Deputy mayor on 21 June 2021. He was then-opposition PPM's council Member. Nareesh represents Maafannu medhu constituency on the council. He has been active in the politics of the Maldives since he was a Council Member of Progressive Party of Maldives.

Nareesh, who formerly served in the Maldives National Defence Force (MNDF), gained popularity in public after former president Yameen used his name to make an example during one of his public speeches.

In March 2025, he resigned from his role as Deputy Mayor and described his time as "the happiest in my career.” He was later appointed as the Advisor to the Minister of Youth Empowerment, Information and Arts on 16 March 2025.
