= Ibrahim Mimrah =

Maldivian politician

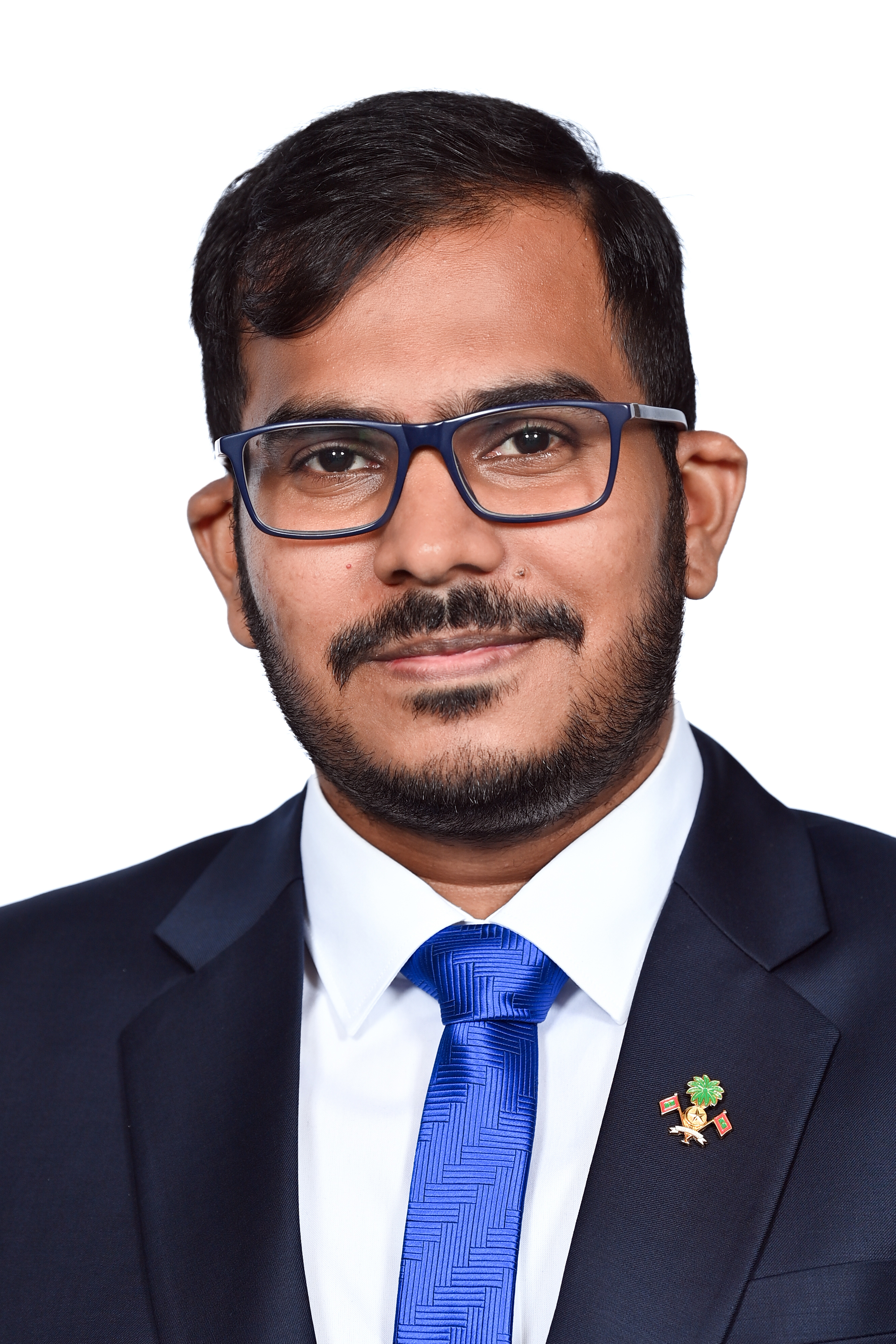
- Mimrah in 2023

Minister of State for Tourism and Environment
- Incumbent
- Assumed office 13 December 2023
- President: Mohamed Muizzu

Ibrahim Mimrah is a Maldivian politician who is currently serving as the Minister of State for Tourism and Environment since 2023. He was appointed by president Mohamed Muizzu on 13 December 2023.
