= Hussain Abdul Rahman =

Deputy Attorney General of the Maldives from 1981 to 1990

- Portrait, 2013

Deputy Attorney General of the Maldives
- In office 11 August 1981 – 22 February 1990
- President: Maumoon Abdul Gayoom
- Attorney General: None (1981–1983); Ahmed Zaki (1983)

Acting Attorney General of the Maldives
- In office 11 August 1981 – 11 November 1983
- President: Maumoon Abdul Gayoom

Personal details
- Born: 1942 Vashafaru, Haa Alif Atoll, Maldives
- Died: 28 September 2015 (aged 73) Mecca, Saudi Arabia
- Spouse(s): Gnei Skeelan Hussain (m. 2002) Husna Adam (m. 1976; div. 1978)
- Children: Mohamed Muizzu
- Education: Al-Azhar University

Hussain Abdul Rahman (c. 1942 – 28 September 2015) was a Maldivian lawyer who served as the deputy attorney general of the Maldives from August 1981 to February 1990, and as the acting attorney general from August 1981 to November 1983. He was also the father of Mohamed Muizzu, the incumbent president of the Maldives.

Born in Vashafaru, Rahman graduated from Al-Azhar University with a degree in Sharia and Law in 1975. He later returned to the university in 1986 to complete a master's degree in Sharia policy. After graduating in 1975, he initially served as a special judge in the Ministry of Justice, overseeing various courts in Malé at different times. He also worked as an Arabic teacher.

== Early life and family ==
Hussain Abdul Rahman was born in 1942, in Vashafaru, Haa Alif Atoll, Maldives.

In 1976, Rahman married Husna Adam, and on 15 June 1978, their first and only child, Mohamed Muizzu was born. Shortly after Muizzu's birth, Rahman divorced. In 2002, Rahman married a Sri Lankan Women, Gnei Skeelan Hussain.

=== Education ===
In 1975, Rahman graduated from the Al-Azhar University in Egypt, with a degree in Kulliyat al-Shari'ah wa al-Qanun (Shariah Law). Later in 1986, he returned to the university, where he got a masters degree in Shariah policy.

== Career ==
After returning from Egypt in 1975, Rahman initially served as a special judge in the Ministry of Justice, where his duties included examining case documents at the request of the Minister of Justice, providing judicial and legal advice in writing, and overseeing courts when a judge was on leave or when a vacancy arose. At various times, he managed all the courts in Malé under the Ministry of Justice. He also worked as an Arabic teacher.

=== Public service ===
Rahman served the government for over 33 years, holding various senior positions throughout his career. In addition to his role as a special judge in the Ministry of Justice, he has held several key positions, including counsel in the Attorney General's Office, High Court Judge, Deputy Attorney General, Director of Religious Education, and Special Advisor to the Supreme Council on Islamic Affairs.

=== Religious career ===
Rahman delivered numerous lectures on various religious topics, with many of his speeches broadcast on radio and television, including the Voice of Maldives. He also provided sermons and religious advice on programmes for Television Maldives. In addition, he translated the Arabic programme Durub un-Noor (Paths of Light) into Dhivehi, which was regularly aired during Ramadan and other religious occasions.

His involvement in the committee established by The President's Office to translate the Quran into the Dhivehi language was notable. The committee was formed on 25 April 1979 and, from its establishment until its dissolution in 2008, he actively participated in its work without interruption. Rahman earned respect from other scholars who played a leading role in the committee.

Rahman wrote numerous Friday Khutbahs for an extended period. In 1995, The President's Office published Friday Khutbahs and Two Eid Prayers, and the Eclipse Prayer Khutbah, which included Khutbahs he wrote. Additionally, he contributed articles on various topics to the weekly newspaper The Path of Religion (Dheenuge Magu), published by The President's Office.

In teacher training courses, Rahman taught numerous lessons about Islam to course participants on several occasions. He delivered lectures in teacher training programmes for many years. During the 1990s, he spoke on various topics at Majeediyya School and Aminiya School to enhance religious awareness among students. He also provided religious advice during morning assemblies at both schools on several occasions. Additionally, he was a long-serving member of the National Assembly on Mosques and served as Secretary of the Assembly during one term.

=== Writing career ===
Rahman was an avid writer who dedicated much of his time to writing and translating books until his death. He published numerous works in the field of religion, including translations. His notable books include As-Sihur, The Beard from an Islamic Perspective, and The State, Rulers, Responsibility and the Meaning of Obedience. Some of his translations include Men, Women and Gender, What is Unlikely to Cause Disagreement Among Muslims, and Ahwa al-Qabur (The Fear of the Grave). Additionally, he made significant contributions with his books on the philosophy of language and research, such as Thikithelhi Thaana.............Olhuvaanulahvaa and Zavaajee Hayaaiy baajjaveri vaanee kihineh?, both of which are important works in Dhivehi language.

== Death ==
In 2015, Abdul Rahman and his family went to Hajj, where he died in Mecca, Saudi Arabia, on 28 September 2015, following a cardiac arrest.

== Recognition ==
He was granted a posthumous award from the Supreme Court of the Maldives in October 2024.

== Awards ==
- Maldives: National Award of Honour for Promoting Islamic Awareness, Service, and Teaching Religious Knowledge – 2013.
