= List of mayors of Malé =

Head of the municipal government of Malé

Mayor of Malé City

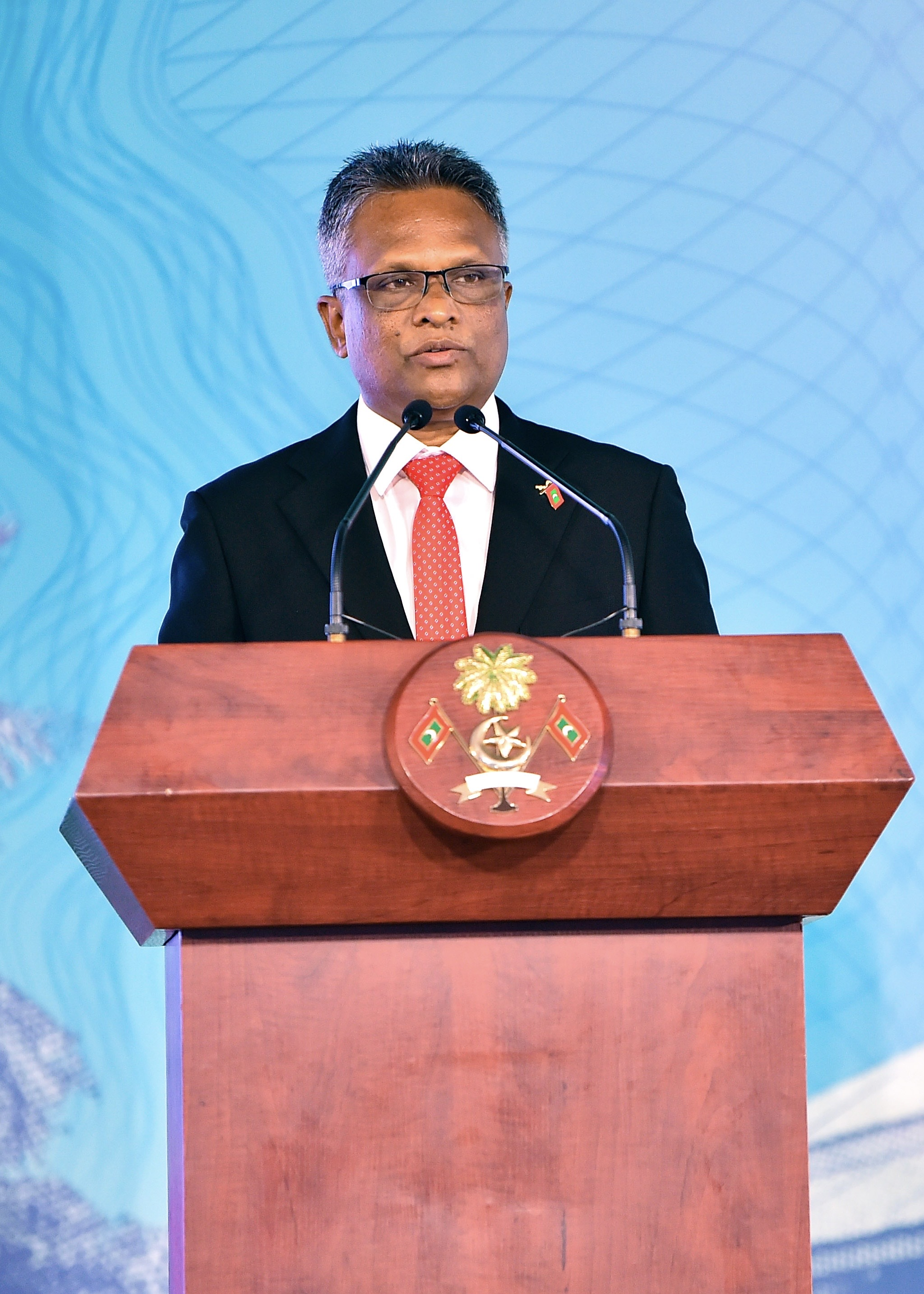
- Incumbent; Adam Azim since 17 May 2026
- Malé City Council
- Style: Mayor
- Term length: 5 years
- Inaugural holder: Adam Manik
- Website: malecity.gov.mv

The Mayor of Malé, officially the Mayor of Malé City, is head of the municipal government of Malé City, the capital of the Maldives. The mayor is the head of the Malé City Council.

On 3 July 1956 (Note: One report says 1968 while another press release says 1956.), the Malé Municipality was established as the governing body of Malé City. In 2011, the Malé City Council was established as an independent autononmous body in accordance with the Decentralization Act that replaced the Malé Municipality. The first mayor to be sworn in under the new Malé City Council was Adam "Sarangu" Manik, who previously served as the President of the Malé Municipality. He was elected after eight out of the eleven councillors voted for him. Manik later resigned in July 2011.

In December 2019, President Ibrahim Mohamed Solih ratified an amendment to the Decentralization Act that made mayors directly elected by residents. In 2021, the first direct election took place, where Mohamed Muizzu of the Progressive Party of Maldives (PPM) defeated Anas Abdul Sattar of the Maldivian Democratic Party (MDP). In 2023, Muizzu ran in the that year's presidential election and won, which led to Deputy Mayor Ahmed Nareesh serving as the acting mayor as decided by a council meeting.

In January 2024, a by-election was held where Adam Azim of the MDP won against Aishath Azima Shakoor of the People's National Congress (PNC). Azim had also subsequently won the 2026 mayoral election as well.

== List ==
| No. | Portrait | Name (born-died) | Term | | | Political party | Ref. |
| No. | Portrait | Name (born-died) | Took office | Left office | Time in office | Political party | Ref. |
Mayor of Malé
| 1 | Adam Manik | Adam Manik | 26 February 2011 | 7 July 2011 | 131 days | ? | |
| 2 | Ali Manik | Ali Manik | 18 July 2011 | 4 June 2017 | 5 years, 321 days | Independent | |
| 3 | Shifa Mohamed | Shifa Mohamed | 4 June 2017 | 17 May 2021 | 3 years, 347 days | MDP | |
| 4 | Mohamed Muizzu | Mohamed Muizzu (born 1978) | 17 May 2021 | 17 November 2023 (Note: He resigned to be sworn in as the President of the Maldives) | 2 years, 184 days | PPM | |
| - | Ahmed Nareesh | Ahmed Nareesh; Acting | 17 November 2023 (Note: Acting mayor as decided by a council meeting) | 22 January 2024 | 66 days | PPM | |
| 5 | Adam Azim | Adam Azim | 22 January 2024 | Incumbent | 2 years, 267 days | MDP | |
