= Adam Azim (politician) =

Maldivian politician

- އާދަމް އާޒިމް
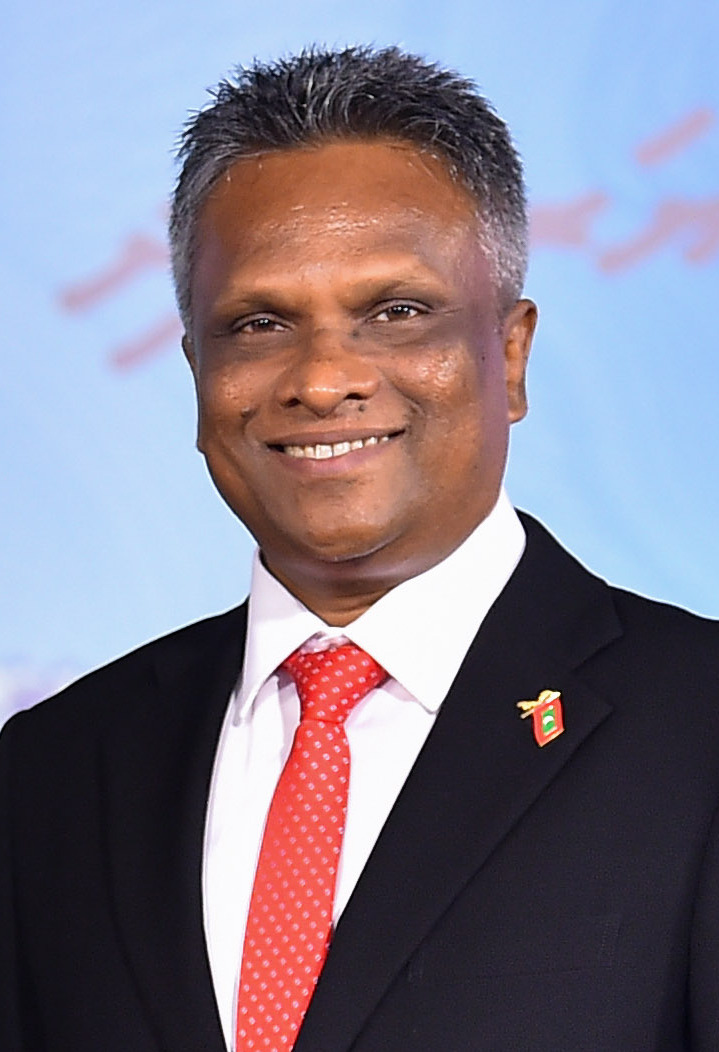
- Azim in 2024

Mayor of Malé
- Incumbent
- Assumed office 22 January 2024
- President: Mohamed Muizzu
- Deputy: Ahmed Nareesh (2021–2025); Mohamed Areeeh (2025–2026); Meekail Mohamed Riyaz (2026–present)
- Preceded by: Ahmed Nareesh (acting mayor)

CEO of Maldives Transport and Contracting Company
- In office 21 January 2020 – 17 November 2023
- Succeeded by: Abdulla Ziyad

Personal details
- Born: Malé, Maldives
- Party: Maldivian Democratic Party
- Other political affiliations: Jumhooree Party
- Relations: Mohamed Nazim (brother)
- Education: University of Nottingham; University of East London
- Profession: Politician

Adam Azim (Dhivehi: އާދަމް އާޒިމް) is a Maldivian politician who is currently serving as the Mayor of Malé since 2024.

He won the mayoral by-lections, defeating ruling party, People's National Congress's candidate, Aishath Azima Shakoor.

== Education ==
Azim studied at the University of Nottingham where he earned his Master of Business Administration in Financial Studies. He also has a Bachelor of Arts (Hons) in Accounting and Finance from the University of East London. He holds an Advance Diploma in Management and Accounting from Chartered Institute of Management Accountants.

== Career ==
Azim began his career at Coopers & Lybrand as an Audit Assistant. Azim also worked at Island Bevarages Maldives Pvt Ltd, eventually rising to the rank of Deputy CEO.

Azim had been the Chairman of Maldives Structural Products Pvt Ltd, Maldives National Oil Company Ltd, STO Maldives (Singapore) Pte Ltd, STO Hotel & Resorts Pvt Ltd, Island Beverages Maldives Pvt Ltd (a subsidiary of MWSC) and acting Chairman of the Addu International Airport Pvt Ltd.

Azim was appointed as the Managing Director of the State Trading Organization in November 2013, serving until March 2015.

In 2016, Azim was announced as the Shadow Minister of Trade and Transport in the Maldives United Opposition.

Azim was arrested on 8 June 2017 for "encouraging overthrow of government". Azim was questioned over remarks he made on a show broadcast on Sangu TV. His arrest was condemned by the Maldivian Democratic Party (MDP) and Amnesty International. On 14 June 2017, he was released.

Azim also served as the Managing Director and Executive Board Director of Maldives Water & Sewerage Company Pvt Ltd.

In January 2020, he was appointed as the CEO of the Maldives Transport and Contracting Company (MTCC).

In March 2023, Azim resigned from the Jumhooree Party and backed Ibrahim Mohamed Solih in the 2023 presidential election.

In November 2023, Azim announced that he was planning to run in the Maldivian Democratic Party's primary for the mayoral race. He later won the mayoral by-election.

=== Mayoralty ===
Azim took his oath on 22 January 2024, which was administered by Supreme Court Justice Uz Mahaz Ali Zahir.

During his time as mayor, mosque cleaning increased from every month to everyday, no garbage on the roads, and cleaning out areas where rats are heavily present.

Azim had been accused of formally awarding land projects to individuals that were close to him, drew public outcry over the Male' City Council's order to remove a decades-old tree in Vilimalé to clear space for a bus route during Ramadan, not enforcing procedural rules that require written warnings and notifications to the Local Government Authority when councillors miss consecutive meetings.

In November 2025, Azim began campaigning for a second term as mayor. In the MDP primaries, Azim won by a landslide. He later won a second term.
