= Habeeba Hussain Habeeb =

Maldivian writer (1930–2022)

- Habeeb in 2011
- Born: 9 September 1930; Malé, Maldive Islands
- Died: 21 November 2022 (aged 92); Malé, Maldives
- Issue: 3
- Dynasty: Huraa
- Father: Hussain Habeeb
- Mother: Princess Shaheema Shamsuddin
- Occupation: Writer • librarian

Al Nabeela Habeeba Hussain Habeeb, NDSI (Dhivehi: ޙަބީބާ ޙުސައިން ޙަބީބު; 9 September 1930 – 21 November 2022) was a Maldivian jaariyaa, writer, author, librarian and member of the Maldivian royal family, as the granddaughter of King Muhammad Shamsuddeen III.

Born into the royal family during the reign of her grandfather King Shamsuddeen III, Habeeb graduated from the Usmaniyya High School in India. She serviced to the government of the Maldives for a half-century, where she worked most at the National Library of Maldives from 1978 until her resignation due to old age in 2018.

== Early life ==
Habeeba Hussain Habeeb was born on 9 September 1930, in Malé, the granddaughter of the then-reigning monarch of the Maldives, Muhammad Shamsuddeen III. Her mother was princess Shameema Shamsuddeen, the then second-in line to the Maldivian throne, and her husband, Hussain Habeeb. Habeeb's relative was Mariyam Saeed, a poet.

Habeeb pursued her education at Usmaniyya High School in Hyderabad, India, where she studied in the Urdu medium. She later continued her studies in the English medium in Sri Lanka.

Habeeb married Abdulla Zubair and had three children; Ibrahim Zubair, Shafeea Zubair and Shahida Zubair.

== Career ==
In 1955, Habeeb began her teaching career as a history teacher at Majeediyya School and Aminiya School, marking the start of her engagement with the subject. On 12 December 1978, Habeeb joined as the first librarian at the National Library of Maldives—she was the head of the library from 1981 until she resigned from the post in 2018. As head, she was the longest serving head of the library. Habeeb was also one of the two founding members of the Maldives Library Association in 1981 and was the president of the association from its founding to 2006.

Habeeb began her writing career in 1954 with contributions to Munnaaru News. Over the years, she has written articles for various publications, including Viyafaari Miadhu, Adhabee Shu’ooru, Jinsu’latheef, Huvandhuma, Moonlight, Amaazu, and Hiyala. After 1980, she was also been a regular contributor to Faiy’thoora magazine.

Habeeb's historical works include a biography of Sultan Muhammad Thakurufaanu, titled "Muhammad Thakurufaanu the Great," and "Dhivehi Thaareekhah Avas Kalhi’eh." She also translated the books "Islamic History 1" and "Islamic History 2." Additionally, she is widely recognized for her contributions to the preservation and study of folklore.

Habeeb also served as the President's Member of the People's Majlis from 1989 to 1990. She also supported the democracy movement that arose in 2004 and wrote to former MP Ibrahim Ismail (Ibra) to continue the movement.

== Death ==
On 21 November 2022, at age 92, Habeeb died of old age at ADK Hospital. Following her death, president Ibrahim Mohamed Solih, vice president Faisal Naseem, and former president Maumoon Abdul Gayoom sent condolences.

== Awards ==
Habeeb had been awarded the special presidential award in 1981, 25th Independence award in 1990, National Award of Honour in Dhivehi literature in 2007, and the Order of the Dignified Rule of the Dhiyamigili Dynasty in 2011.
