= Shifa Mohamed =

Maldivian politician

- ޝިފާ މުޙައްމަދު
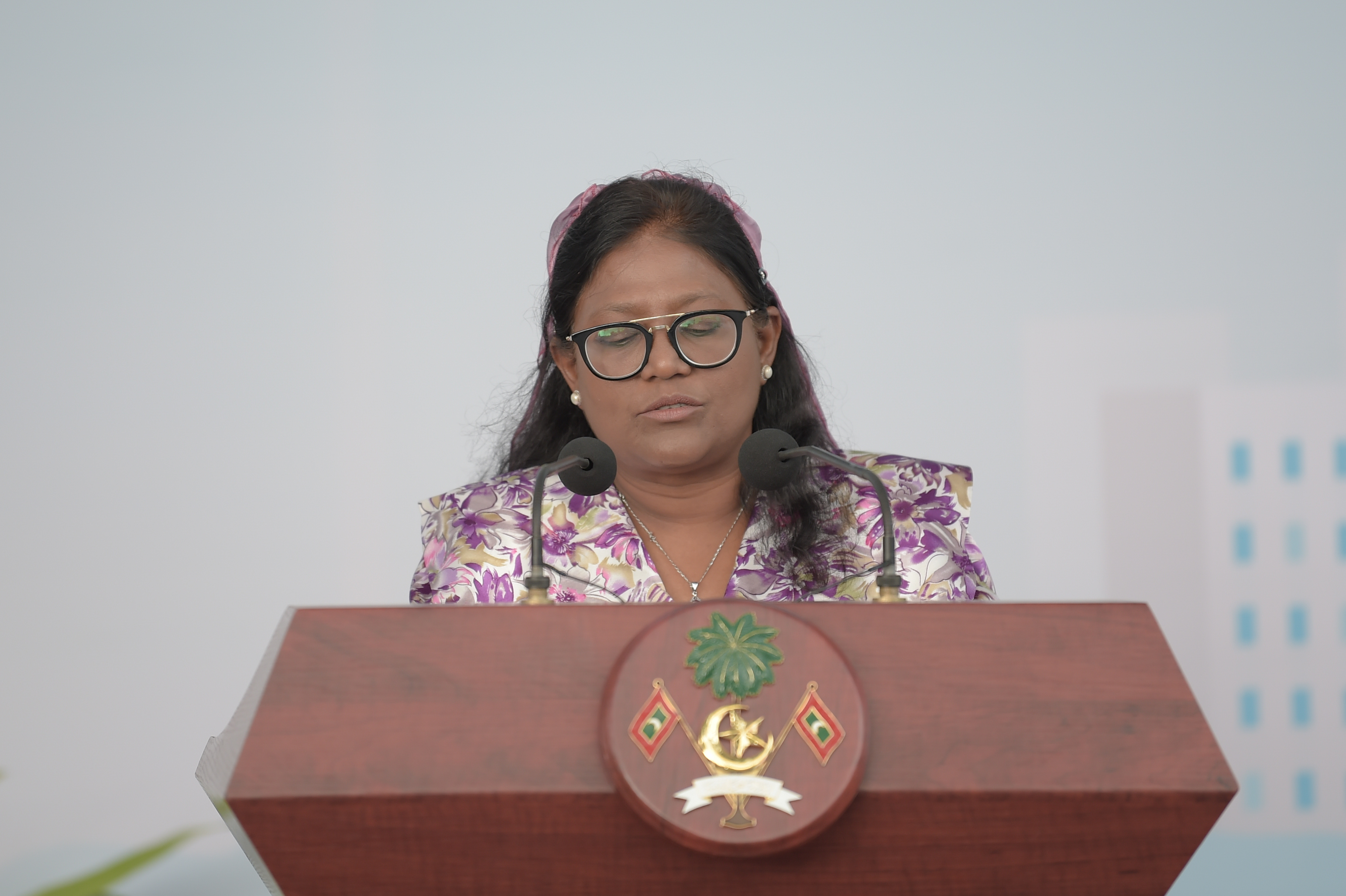
- Shifa in 2019

Minister of Education
- In office 11 December 2010 – 7 February 2012
- President: Mohamed Nasheed
- Preceded by: Mustafa Lutfi
- Succeeded by: Mohamed Aslam (Acting); Asim Ahmed

Mayor of Malé
- In office 4 June 2017 – 17 May 2021
- President: Abdulla Yameen; Ibrahim Mohamed Solih
- Preceded by: Ali Maniku
- Succeeded by: Mohamed Muizzu

Personal details
- Born: Malé, Maldives
- Party: Maldivian Democratic Party

Shifa Mohamed (Dhivehi: ޝިފާ މުޙައްމަދު) is a Maldivian politician who served as the mayor of Malé from 2017 to 2021. A member of the Maldivian Democratic Party, she served as the Minister of Education from 2010 to 2012.

== Career ==
She was the former Minister of Education of the Maldives under president Mohamed Nasheed's government and later served as the mayor of Malé until 2019. She was elected as the mayor on 4 June 2017. She also served as the Deputy Minister of Education.
