= Mustafa Lutfi =

Maldivian politician

Mustafa Lutfi NDSI
- މުސްޠަފާ ލުޠުފީ
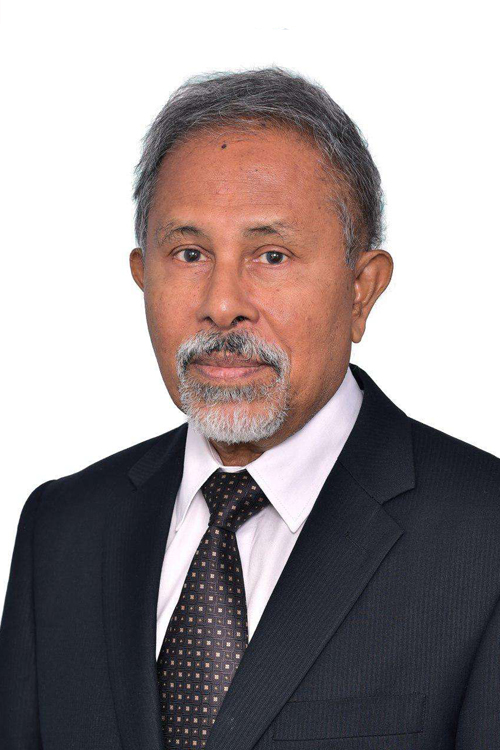
- Lutfi in 2018

Special Advisor on Social Policy at The President's Office
- In office 27 November 2018 – 17 November 2023
- President: Ibrahim Mohamed Solih
- Preceded by: Office created
- Succeeded by: Office abolished

Chancellor of the Maldives National University
- In office 15 February 2011 – 22 February 2012
- President: Mohamed Nasheed; Mohamed Waheed Hassan
- Preceded by: Office created
- Succeeded by: Mohamed Latheef

Minister of Education
- In office 7 July 2010 – 11 December 2010
- President: Mohamed Nasheed
- Succeeded by: Shifa Mohamed
- In office 12 November 2008 – 29 June 2010
- President: Mohamed Nasheed
- Preceded by: Zahiya Zareer

Minister of Tourism
- In office 15 September 2004 – 13 July 2005
- President: Maumoon Abdul Gayoom
- Preceded by: Hassan Sobir
- Succeeded by: Mahmood Shaugee

Personal details
- Party: Maldivian Democratic Party (2010–present)
- Other political affiliations: Gaumee Itthihaad (until 2010)
- Spouse: Hafeeza Adam
- Children: Fazail Lutfi, Nazla Musthafa
- Education: University of Birmingham; La Trobe University

Mustafa Lutfi, NDSI is a Maldivian academic and politician who has held several high-ranking government and academic positions. He served as the Minister of Education from 2008 to 2010, during which he led major reforms that significantly improved national exam outcomes. He was also the first Chancellor of the Maldives National University and previously served as Minister of Tourism. From 2018 to 2023, he was appointed as Special Advisor on Social Policy at rank of a minister, to President Ibrahim Mohamed Solih. Over his decades-long career, Dr. Lutfi has made enduring contributions to the Maldivian education system and public policy. In recognition of his service, he was awarded the Order of the Dignified Rule of the Dhiyamigili Dynasty in 2023.

== Education ==
After completing his A-Levels, Lutfi received his Primary Teaching Diploma in 1976 in Mysore, India. He also obtained a certificate in History and Philosophy and a diploma in educational management from Moray House School of Education and Sport. In 1990, he completed his Master of Education from the University of Birmingham.

Lutfi completed his PhD in the field of education at La Trobe University in 2004.

== Career ==
Lutfi served as the Minister of Tourism from 15 September 2004 to 13 July 2005.

He also served as Minister of Education from 12 November 2008 until his resignation on 11 December 2010 under the presidency of Mohamed Nasheed. During his time as Minister of Education, he revised the national curriculum, which saw O' level pass rates skyrocket from 27% in 2009 to 46% in 2012.

He served as the first Chancellor of the Maldives National University from 15 February 2011 to 22 February 2012.

Later on in 2013, he was announced as the running mate of Mohamed Nasheed in the 2013 Maldivian presidential election, where they lost.

On 27 November 2018, he was appointed the Special Advisor on Social Policy to the President by Ibrahim Mohamed Solih, until 17 November 2023.

== Awards ==
In 2004, Lutfi received the special award presented by the Government of the Republic of Maldives for completing his PhD.

In July 2023, President Ibrahim Mohamed Solih awarded the Order of the Dignified Rule of the Dhiyamigili Dynasty to Lutfi in recognition of his national contributions to the government over a period of more than 34 years and his invaluable contributions to the education sector of the Maldives. The award was presented at an official ceremony held at the Maldives Centre for Social Education in commemoration of the Maldives’ 58th anniversary of independence.
