= Vashafaru =

Vashafaru ވަށަފަރު
- island
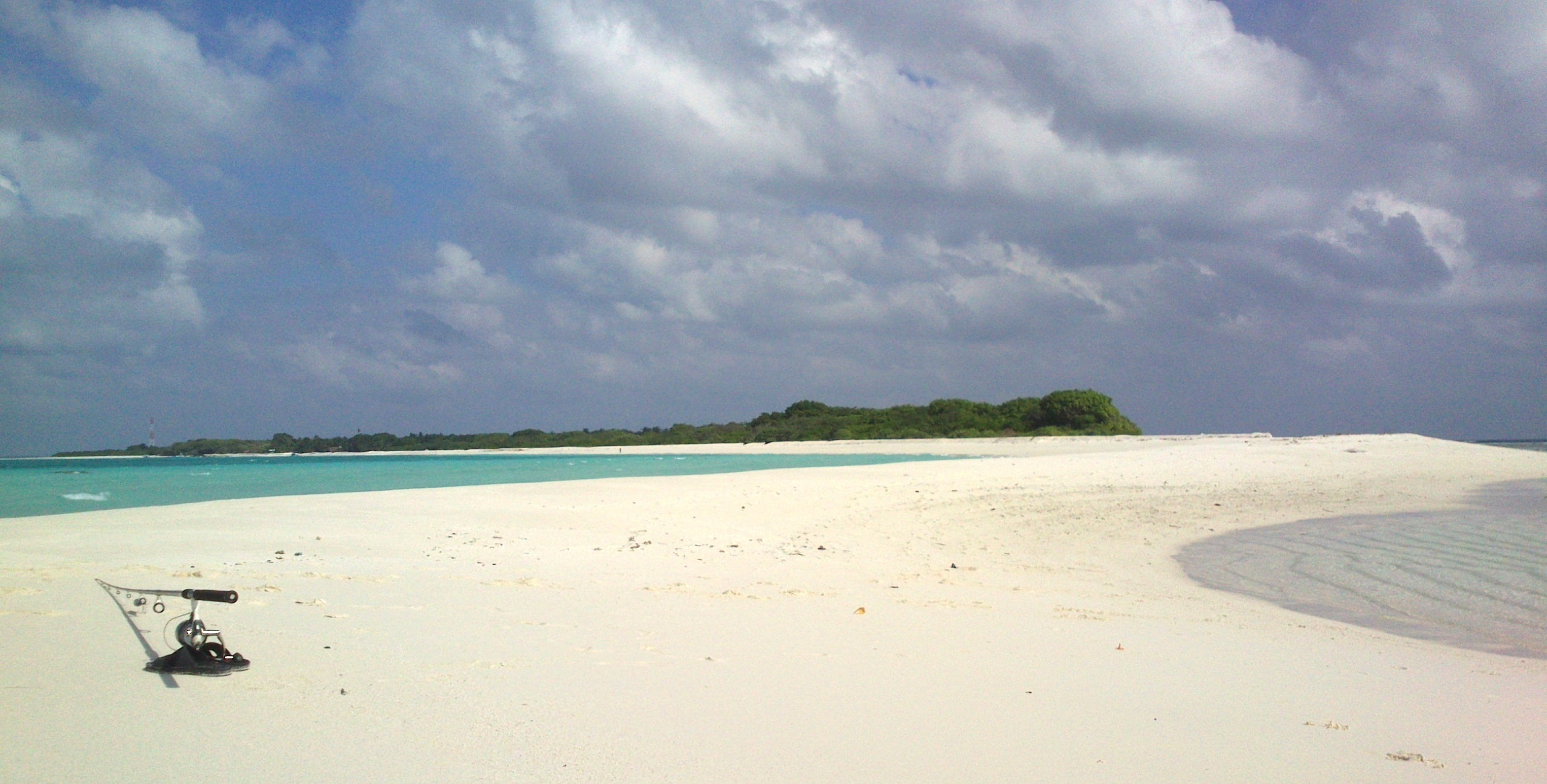
- Vashafaru-thundi

- Location in Maldives
- Coordinates: 6°53′50″N 73°09′40″E
- Country: Maldives
- Geographic atoll: Thiladhunmathi Atoll
- Administrative atoll: Haa Alif Atoll
- Distance to Malé: 303.46 km (188.56 mi)

Government
  - Council: Vashafaru Island Council

Dimensions
  - Length: 1.95 km (1.21 mi)
  - Width: 0.22 km (0.14 mi)

Population (2022)
  - Total: 476
- Time zone: UTC+05:00 (MST)
- Area code(s): 650, 20

Vashafaru (Dhivehi: ވަށަފަރު) is one of the inhabited islands of Haa Alif Atoll and is geographically part of Thiladhummathi Atoll in the north of the Maldives. It is an island-level administrative constituency governed by the Vashafaru Island Council.

== Geography ==
The island is 303.46 km (189 mi; 164 nmi) north of the country's capital, Malé.

== Demography ==
Historical population
Year	Pop.	±%
2006	471	—
2014	426	−9.6%
2022	476	+11.7%
2006-2014-2022: Census populations Source:
