= Mohamed Muizzu =

President of the Maldives since 2023

- މުޙައްމަދު މުޢިއްޒު
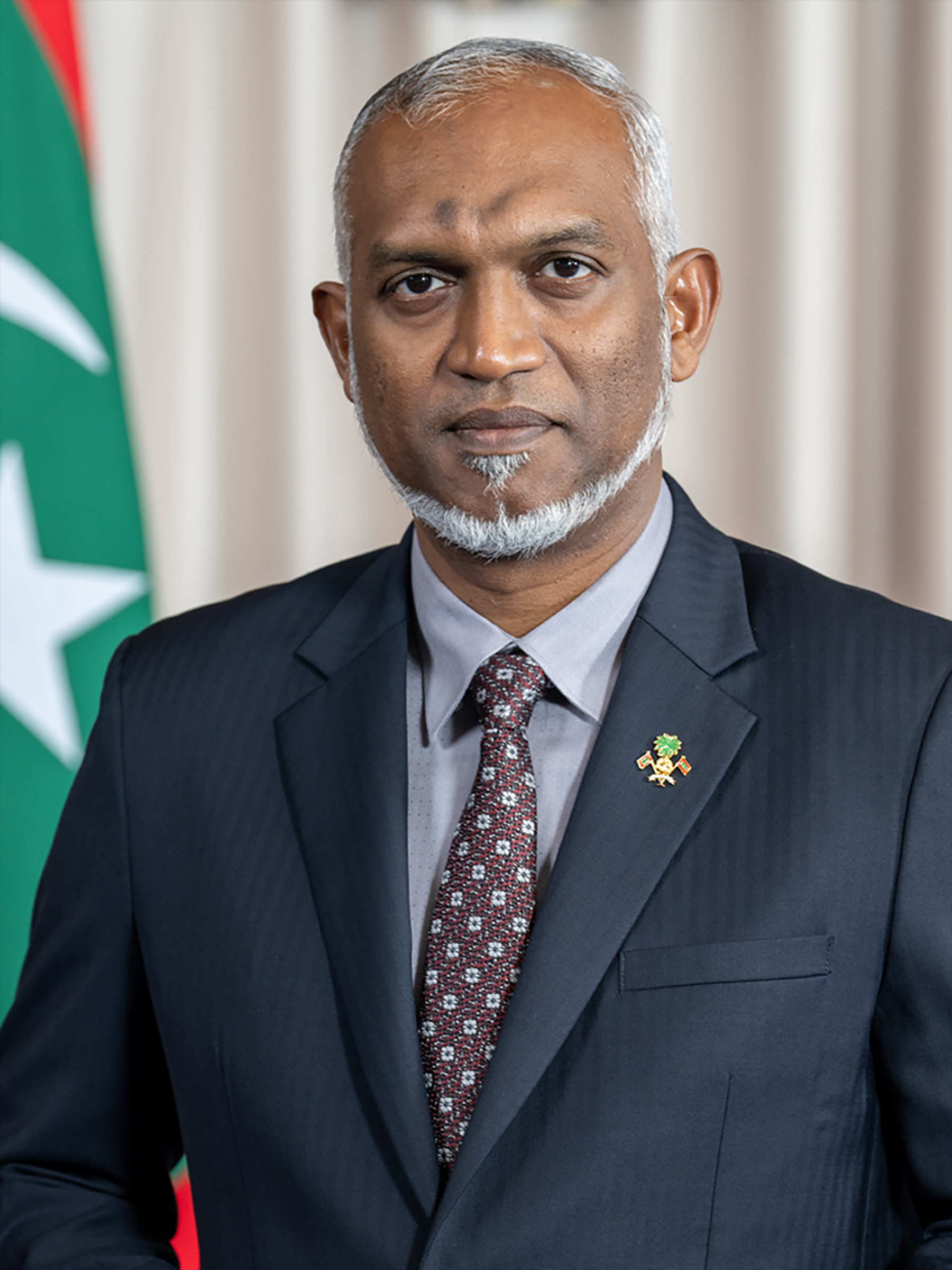
- Official portrait, 2024

8th President of the Maldives
- Incumbent
- Assumed office 17 November 2023
- Vice President: Hussain Mohamed Latheef
- Preceded by: Ibrahim Mohamed Solih

Minister of Housing and Infrastructure
- In office 21 May 2012 – 17 November 2018
- President: Mohamed Waheed Hassan; Abdulla Yameen
- Preceded by: Himself
- Succeeded by: Mohamed Aslam

Minister of Housing and Environment
- In office 19 February 2012 – 21 May 2012
- President: Mohamed Waheed Hassan
- Preceded by: Mohamed Aslam
- Succeeded by: Himself

Personal details
- Born: 15 June 1978 (age 48) Malé, Maldives
- Party: Congress (2023–present)
- Other political affiliations: Adhaalath (2010–2014); Alliance (2014–2018); Progressive (2018–2023)
- Spouse: Sajidha Mohamed (m. 2003)
- Children: Yasmine; Umyr; Zayd
- Parent: Hussain Abdul Rahman (father)
- Relatives: Muizzu Family
- Education: University of London; University of Leeds
- Website: The President's Office
- Mohamed Muizzu's voice Muizzu speaks on the COP28; Recorded 1 December 2023

Mohamed Muizzu (Dhivehi: މުޙައްމަދު މުޢިއްޒު; born 15 June 1978) is a Maldivian politician who is the 8th president of the Maldives, serving since 2023. He served as housing minister from 2012 to 2018, making him the longest-serving housing minister in Maldivian history. He was mayor of Malé from 2021 to 2023. Muizzu is the leader of the People's National Congress since 2023.

Born in Malé, Muizzu studied civil engineering in the United Kingdom, completing his Bachelor's and Master's degrees at the University of London and later earning a PhD at the University of Leeds in 2009. President Waheed appointed Muizzu as the Minister of Housing and Infrastructure in 2012 and remained in the position under president Yameen, until 2018. As minister, Muizzu oversaw several major infrastructure projects. In 2021, he was elected the mayor of Malé, serving until his resignation to assume presidency in 2023. Muizzu led the Progressive–Congress coalition until the Progressive Party of Maldives was dissolved in 2025, and he has continued to serve as president of the Congress party.

Muizzu was nominated as the People's National Congress's 2023 presidential candidate following the imprisonment of former president Abdulla Yameen on corruption charges. The People's National Congress, part of the Progressive–Congress coalition alongside the Progressive Party of Maldives, had originally planned for Yameen to contest the 2023 Maldivian presidential election, but with him ineligible, the party endorsed Muizzu as their candidate. Muizzu defeated the incumbent president Ibrahim Mohamed Solih, receiving the second-highest number of votes for a presidential candidate in Maldivian history.

During his presidency, Muizzu made foreign policy moves, including the expulsion of Indian troops from the Maldives and actions regarding the maritime boundary dispute, seeking to recover the Maldivian maritime area lost to Mauritius following the ruling by the ITLOS. In June 2024, he imposed a ban on Israeli passports following the Gaza war. Deportations of illegal foreigners have been conducted under the Muizzu government. The world's first generational ban on tobacco use was introduced in the Maldives for those born after 2007. Muizzu was named in TIME magazine's 100 most influential people in health in 2026.

== Early life ==
Mohamed Muizzu was born on 15 June 1978 in Maafannu, Malé, Maldives. He was born to Hussain Abdul Rahman and Husna Adam Ismail Manik. Muizzu's father (1942–2015) was an attorney, lawyer and an Islamic scholar, from Haa Alif Atoll Vashafaru. Rahman received the National Award of Honour from then—president Waheed for "contribution in the area of religious awareness and religious education" in 2013. Muizzu's parents separated shortly after his birth, and he was raised by his paternal grandmother until he relocated to live with his mother to attend primary school. He later returned to live with his father. His sister, Fathimath Saudha, ran as a candidate for the People's National Congress in the 2024 Maldivian parliamentary election for the Nilandhoo constituency and won the election held on 21 April 2024.

At the age of 20, he began working for the government in 1998, as a Construction and Public Works Planning Technician Trainee at the Ministry of Construction and Public Works, under the tutelage of Umar Zahir. In the 1990s, Hussain Abdul Rahman, Muizzu's father, established a daily rental hotel business. Rahman died in 2015, and the business was handed over to Muizzu, and the property became his presidential residence while the official residence, Muliaage, was undergoing renovation.

=== Education ===
Muizzu went to Iskandhar School and was educated there from Lower kindergarten to Grade four. He then transferred to Majeediyya School, the oldest school in the Maldives, where he studied from grade 5 to 10. In January 1995, he completed his GCE O'Level exams, achieving first place at the national level. He also attended the Science Education Centre for his Grade 11 and Grade 12 studies, where he completed his GCE A'Level exams in July 1997, securing fourth place nationally.

In 2005 he obtained an Overseas Research Scholarship from the British government to study PhD in civil engineering at the University of Leeds. His PhD thesis concerned "Thermal and time-dependent effects on monolithic reinforced concrete roof slab-wall joints" and was awarded in 2009. He has also obtained the Project Management Professional (PMP) and PRINCE2 Practitioner Certification 2019.

== Political career ==
=== Minister of Housing ===
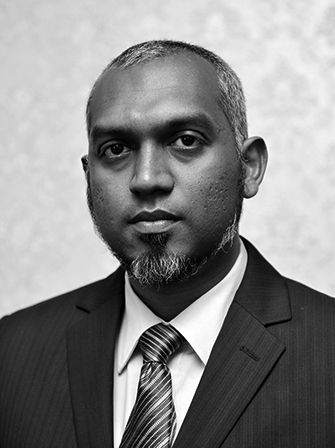
Official portrait as Housing Minister, 2012

In 2012, Muizzu assumed the role of Minister of Housing and Environment during the administration of President Mohamed Waheed Hassan as a member of the Adhaalath Party. He continued in this post after the 2013 presidential election under President Abdulla Yameen's administration. By this time Muizzu was a member of the Maldives Development Alliance (MDA), part of a coalition government. The Ministry of Housing and Environment was later restructured and renamed as the Ministry of Housing and Infrastructure during his five-year term in office.

From February 2012 to November 2018, Muizzu held the position of Minister of Housing and Infrastructure, a tenure marked by significant achievements in the execution of housing projects in the Maldives. During this period, the country witnessed the rise of its tallest buildings and the realization of major infrastructure undertakings, including extensive roadworks and land reclamation efforts. Among the prominent projects completed under his guidance were the Sinamalé Bridge, Dharumavantha Hospital, Hiya Flats, Hahdhunmathi main road, Malé Ring Road, Malé Industrial Village, and the reclamation of Hulhumalé Phase II.

Moreover, the development of numerous parks and public areas under his direction brought about a substantial transformation of Malé City. Muizzu also facilitated the successful completion of various land reclamation, harbour enhancement, and water and sewerage projects throughout the atolls, contributing to the comprehensive development of the Maldives' infrastructure.

=== Political parties ===
In 2010, Muizzu was appointed as Secretary General of the Adhaalath Party. He remained in the position, while serving as Minister of Housing. Following the 2018 presidential election, Muizzu left the Maldives Development Alliance and joined the party of the outgoing president, the Progressive Party of Maldives. In 2019, Muizzu was appointed the vice-president and the head of the Elections Department of the then-opposition (PPM).

On 5 October 2023, Muizzu was appointed as the president of People's National Congress, he assumed the role upon his victory in the presidential election. In December 2023, Muizzu was appointed as the president of PNC's sister party, Progressive Party of Maldives following former party leader, Abdulla Yameen left the party on 23 November to create his own political party.

=== Mayor of Malé ===
In 2021, Mohamed Muizzu was elected as Mayor of Malé, securing 12,470 votes against the candidate from the then–ruling Maldivian Democratic Party. He was sworn into office on 17 May 2021 in a virtual ceremony conducted by High Court Chief Judge Haathif Hilmy. This election marked a significant shift, as Muizzu became the first Mayor of Malé to be directly elected by its citizens and the first to be elected for a five-year term. His victory ended 11 years of control by the Maldivian Democratic Party over the Malé City Council and saw him representing the Progressive Party of Maldives.

During his tenure, Muizzu undertook house calls to gain a deeper understanding of the living conditions in Malé and advocated for decentralisation and the empowerment of local bodies. He served as Mayor from 17 May 2021 until his resignation on 17 November 2023. Notably, Muizzu was the first Mayor to resign from the position. Following his election as President, Deputy Mayor Ahmed Nareesh assumed the role of Acting Mayor. Muizzu’s resignation came after a term of 2 years and 184 days, aligning with his inauguration as president on 17 November 2023.

=== Arrest ===
In 2023, Muizzu was part of several protests by PPM and PNC, which called for the release of former president Abdulla Yameen. He was subsequently arrested and took into police custody, being released a day later.

=== Perjury charges ===
In June 2020, the Prosecutor General's Office (PGO) charged Muizzu with perjury after alleged falsified statement in the court case against Noomadi Resorts and Residences Maldives. He was summoned to the Maldives Police Service about the case.

In March 2021, he was summoned to the Anti-Corruption Commission (ACC), which he claimed was political bias, while the ACC denied this.

In August 2021, preliminary hearing for charges against Muizzu was held at the Criminal Court. In May 2023, the court dismissed the charges against him, citing insufficient evidence.

== 2023 election ==
Mohamed Muizzu's presidential candidacy was announced in August 2023, Following the conviction of former president and opposition leader Abdulla Yameen for embezzlement. Muizzu was nominated as the presidential candidate for the People's National Congress, part of the opposition coalition, with Member of Parliament, Hussain Mohamed Latheef as his running mate. In the first round of the 2023 Maldivian presidential election, he received 46.06% of the vote (101,635 votes), a plurality, and advanced to the second round on 30 September 2023. He was elected president in the second round, winning 54.04% against the incumbent Ibrahim Mohamed Solih's 46.04%. Muizzu was sworn in as the new president on 17 November 2023. Muizzu advocated for Yameen to be held under house arrest, rather than prison, the next day he was elected as president. During the 2023 presidential election campaign, Mohamed Muizzu undertook an extensive tour of 153 inhabited islands and all major cities in the Maldives within 53 days. His campaign, themed "Dhivehinge Raajje" and endorsed by the PPM-PNC coalition, included delivering speeches at 205 separate events.

=== Campaign ===
As the 2023 campaign season heated up, Muizzu's campaign focused on several key issues, including national sovereignty, infrastructure development, and housing. He highlighted his commitment to reversing agreements perceived as threatening Maldives' independence and sovereignty, particularly those involving foreign military presence. Additionally, Muizzu emphasized his plans for substantial housing projects and infrastructure improvements within Malé city and other Atolls.

=== Dr. Mohamed Muizzu ===
In February 2024, Muizzu published Dr. Mohamed Muizzu (Dhivehi: ޑރ. މުޙައްމަދު މުޢިއްޒު), a book containing his speeches during his presidential campaign. It was officially published into government institutions, schools and libraries and The President's Office.

== Presidency ==
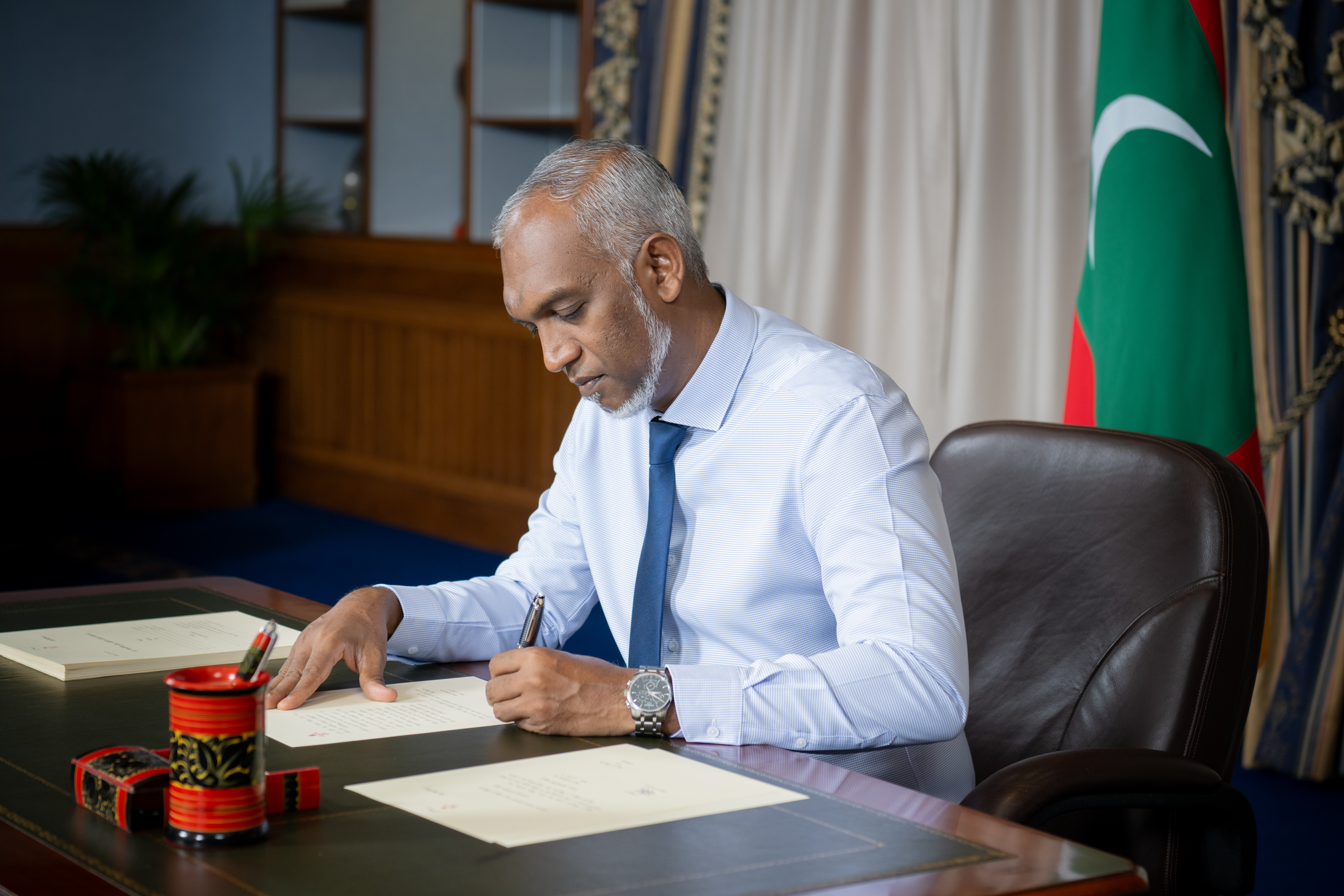
Muizzu's Working portrait

Mohamed Muizzu assumed office as the 8th President of the Republic of Maldives on 17 November 2023. He is the fourth president to be democratically elected and the sixth from Malé. His oath of office, alongside his running mate Hussain Mohamed Latheef, were administered by Ahmed Muthasim Adnan, Chief Justice of the Maldives at the Republic Square.

A report was leaked from the Maldives Monetary Authority in April 2024 which allegedly connected Muizzu to corruption citing irregularities in money transfers. On 18 September 2025, Muizzu signed the Maldives Media and Broadcasting Regulation Bill into law, allowing for high fines and the temporary or permanent closure of media outlets deemed to violate its provisions. On 3 May 2025, Muizzu held a press conference that lasted nearly 15 hours, which his office said was a new record for a president.

=== First 100 days ===
In the initial days of his presidency, Muizzu initiated the withdrawal of Indian troops from the Maldives. (Note: Several sources:) During his campaign, he promised to launch several housing projects within his first 100 days, establish a dedicated trust fund for housing, and implement a policy to cap housing loan interest rates at five percent. Muizzu began efforts to terminate secret agreements made by previous administrations with foreign nations that he claimed threatened Maldivian independence and sovereignty. He also appealed against the International Tribunal for the Law of the Sea's ruling that affected part of the South Sea within the country's Exclusive Economic Zone.

=== China and India relations ===
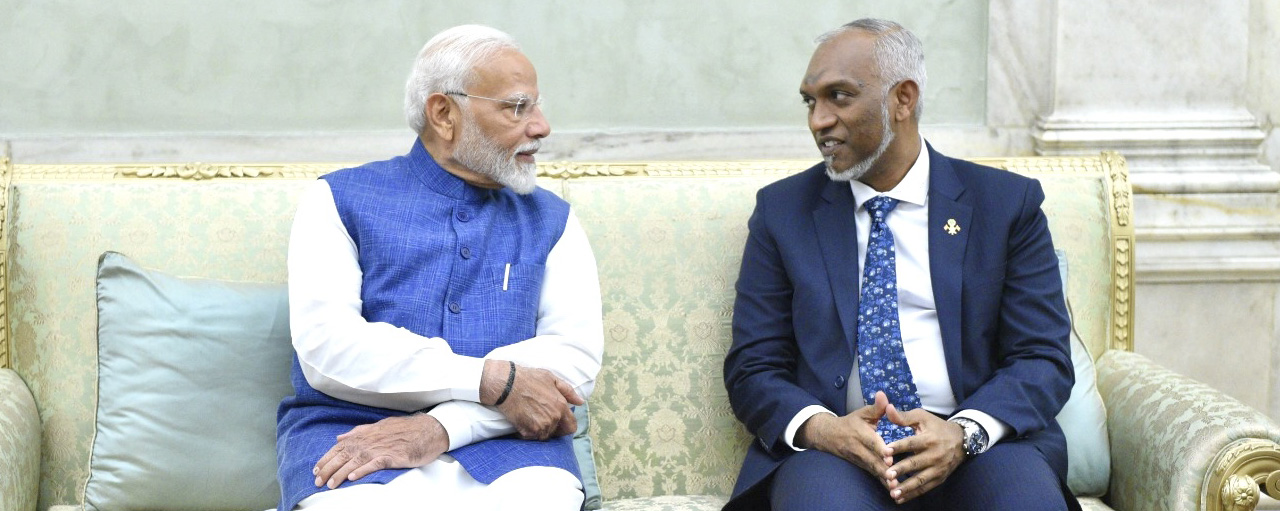
Muizzu meeting Narendra Modi in India in 2024.

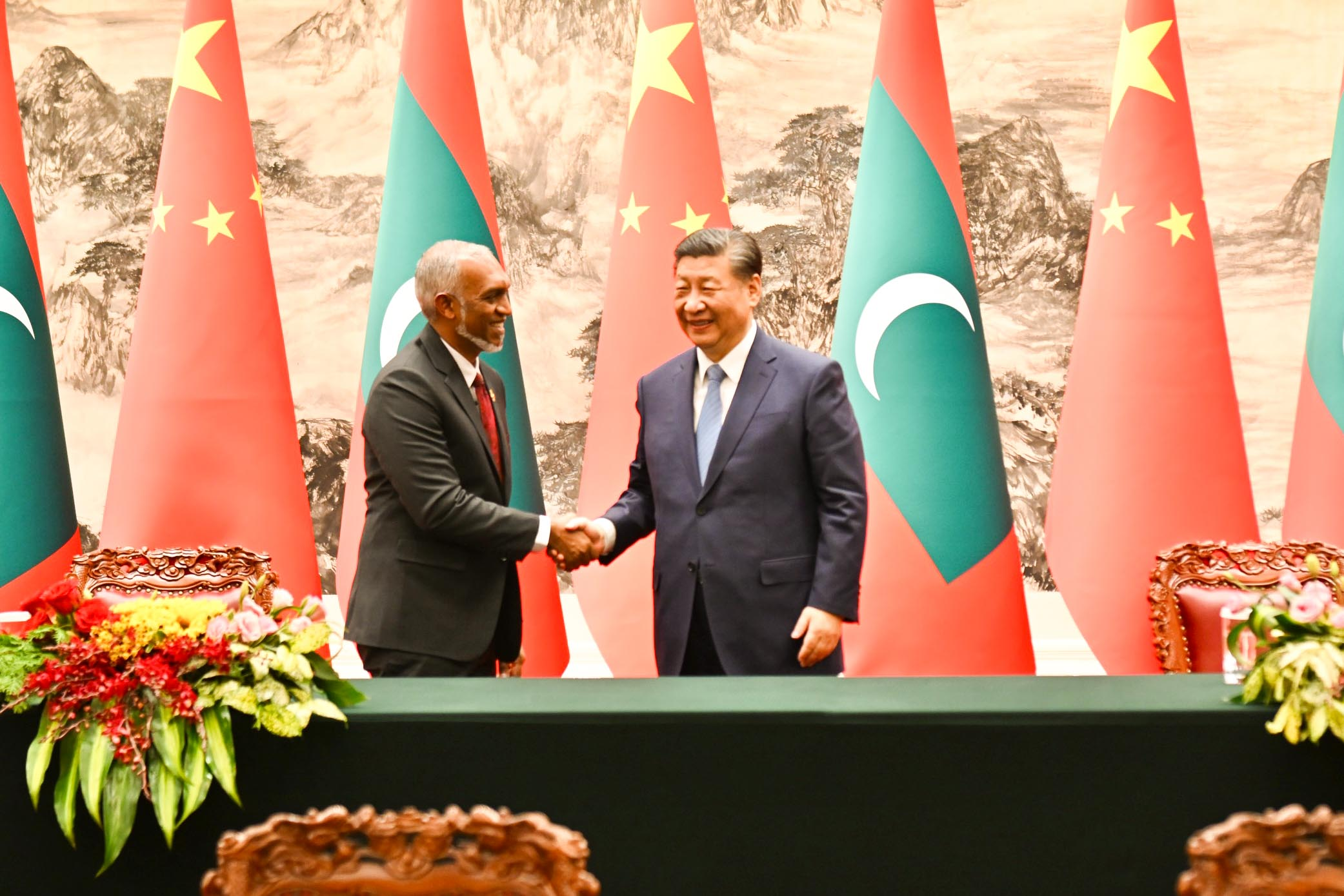
Muizzu meeting Xi Jinping in January 2024.

On 7 January 2024, Muizzu visited China at the invitation of President Xi Jinping. His campaign had been focused on reducing Indian influence in Maldivian affairs, and he is considered pro-China. Upon his return, Muizzu stated that while the Maldives is a small country, it should not be subject to bullying. He outlined that China-Maldives relations are based on mutual respect, sovereign equality, territorial integrity, and non-interference in internal matters. As of February 2024, Muizzu had called for the removal of all Indian troops from the Maldives. By 10 May 2024, all Indian armed forces had departed.

=== Israel and Palestine ===
President Mohamed Muizzu's foreign policy strongly supports Palestine and consistently advocates for their rights on international platforms. On 23 December 2023, Muizzu commended the United Nations Security Council resolution demanding increased humanitarian assistance for the people of Gaza. He emphasized that aid delivery amidst ongoing airstrikes is impractical and urged the international community to build upon this resolution to end hostilities and ensure the rights of the Palestinian people, including their right to self-determination. Following the Security Council's resolution calling for safe and unhindered humanitarian access throughout Gaza, Muizzu highlighted the persistent brutal attacks faced by Palestinians and called for stronger, more concrete international actions.

On 26 January 2024, Muizzu welcomed the International Court of Justice's order for preliminary measures calling on Israel to prevent and punish direct incitement of genocide in Gaza. He stated that Israel must cease its military actions in Gaza and implement an immediate ceasefire, stressing that peace cannot be achieved through violence and displacement. In line with his administration's support for Palestine, on 2 June 2024, Muizzu, following a Cabinet recommendation, imposed a ban on Israeli passports. This decision included amending laws to prevent entry with Israeli passports and establishing a Cabinet subcommittee to oversee these efforts. Additionally, Muizzu appointed a special envoy to assess Palestinian needs, launched a fundraising campaign with the United Nations Relief and Works Agency, and organized a nationwide rally under the slogan "Falastheenaa Eku Dhivehin" to demonstrate Maldivians solidarity with Palestine.

=== Economic policy ===
In January 2024, Muizzu announced plans to establish a development bank and review economic policies. Following Cabinet discussions, he decided to create the Maldives International Financial Services Authority and aims to develop a creative economy. Additionally, he launched a multimillion-dollar project to upgrade Velana International Airport to increase its capacity to 25 million passengers. This project necessitated the relocation of seaplane terminals to Funadhoo. Muizzu also announced the construction of two new airports to expand transportation and bolster the economy.

== Personal life ==
In an interview during Muizzu's election, Muizzu and First Lady Sajidha highlighted that they met on Ibrahim Nasir International Airport in April 2003.

Muizzu married Sajidha Mohamed on 18 May 2003; they have three children, Yasmine, Umair and Zaid. (Note: Yasmine b.2004, Umair b.2008 and Zaid b.2015.)

== Awards and recognitions ==
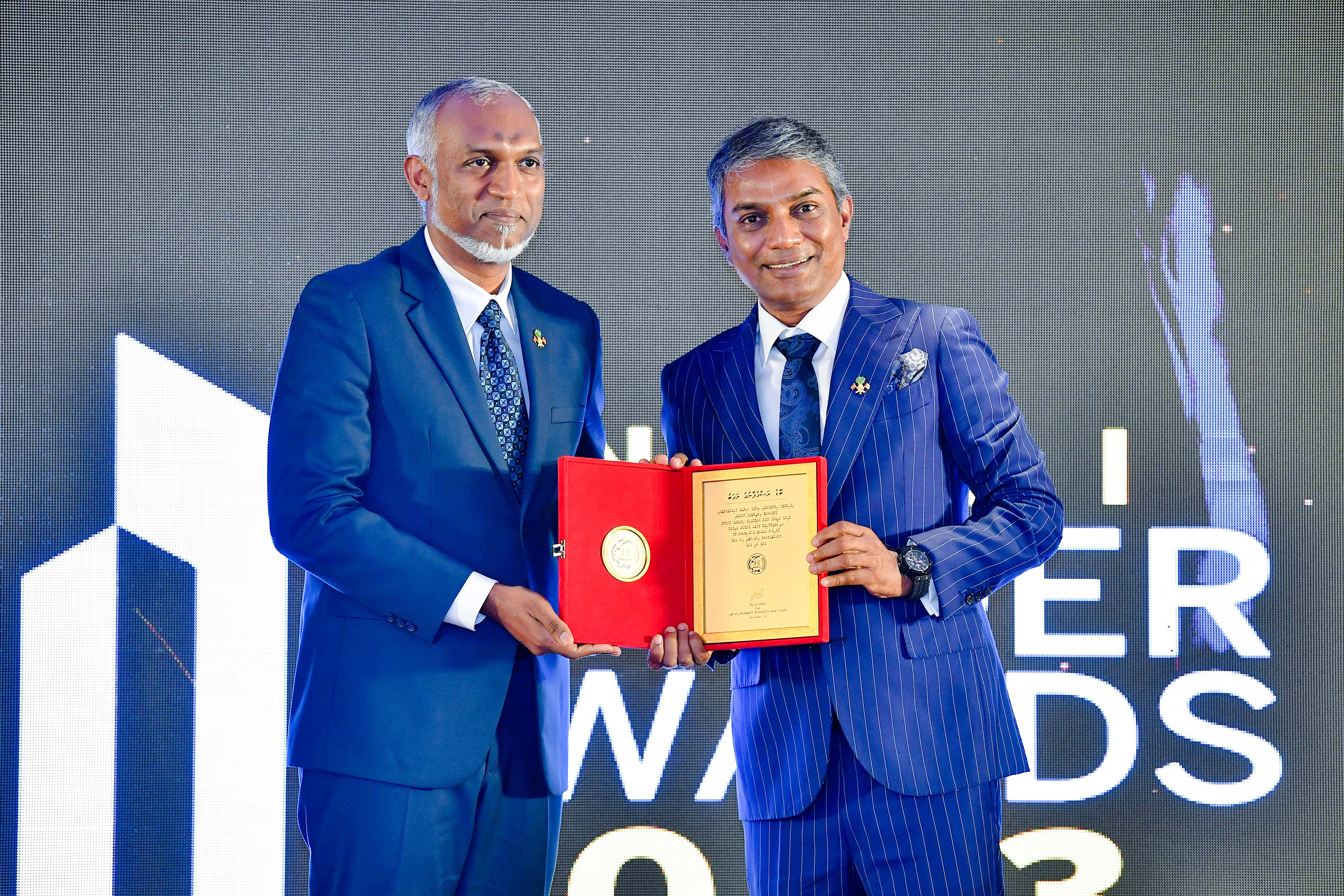
Muizzu being awarded by Maldives National Association of Construction Industry in 2023

In 2013, then-minister Muizzu was presented with the Maldives National Award by president Mohamed Waheed Hassan for "Achieving the highest academic qualification in the Maldives."

On 24 December 2023, the Maldives National Association of Construction Industry (MNACI) conferred the "Bodu Rasgefaanu" (lit. 'great king') title on Mohamed Muizzu, in appreciation of his contributions to the Maldives construction industry.

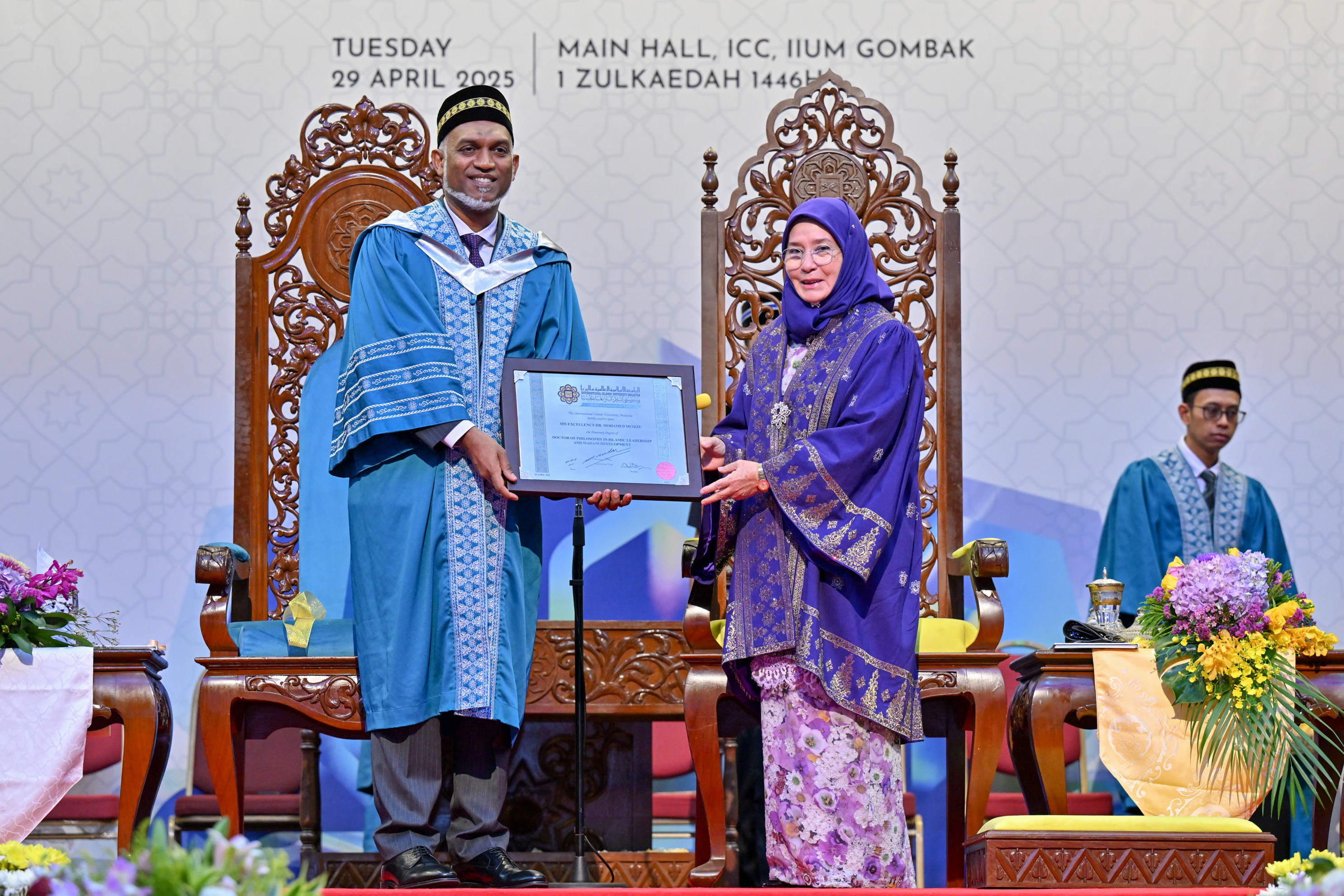
Muizzu being conferred an honorary degree in 2025

On 29 April 2025, International Islamic University Malaysia conferred Muizzu with an honorary degree of Doctor of Philosophy in Islamic Leadership and Madani Development.

On 19 May 2025, Muizzu won the WHO Director-General’s Special Award in recognition with his administration's actions to reduce tobacco consumption.

On 11 February 2026, Muizzu was featured on TIME's 100 most influential people in health. He was included in the list following the government's efforts to curb toboacco use and protect public health. The World Health Organization and Muizzu's cabinet congratulated Muizzu.

Muizzu being conferred an honorary degree in 2026

On 21 October 2026, International Islamic University Islamabad conferred Muizzu with an honorary doctorate. The award was in recognition of his contributions to politics and foreign relations, the development of the Maldives and the defence of Islam.

Political offices
Preceded by Shifa Mohamed	Mayor of Malé; 2021–2023	Succeeded by Ahmed Nareesh as Acting Mayor
Preceded by Ibrahim Mohamed Solih	President of the Maldives; 2023–present	Incumbent
Preceded by Himself	Minister of Housing and Infrastructure; 2012–2018	Succeeded by Mohamed Aslam
Preceded by Mohamed Aslam	Minister of Housing and Environment; 2012–2012	Succeeded by Himself
Party political offices
Preceded by Abdul Raheem Abdulla	President of People's National Congress; 2023 – present	Incumbent
Preceded by Abdulla Yameen	President of Progressive Party of Maldives; 2023–2025	Succeeded by Party dissolved
Other offices
Preceded by Ibrahim Mohamed Solih	Commander-in-Chief of the Armed Forces; 2023–present	Incumbent
Preceded by Ahmed Shiyam	Vice President of Progressive Party of Maldives; 2019–2021	Succeeded by Mohamed Ghassan Maumoon
Preceded by —	Head of the Elections Department of Progressive Party of Maldives; 2019–2021	Succeeded by —
