= Hassan Sobir =

Maldivian politician and diplomat (1951–2025)

Hassan Sobir NIIV
- ޙަސަން ޞާބިރު
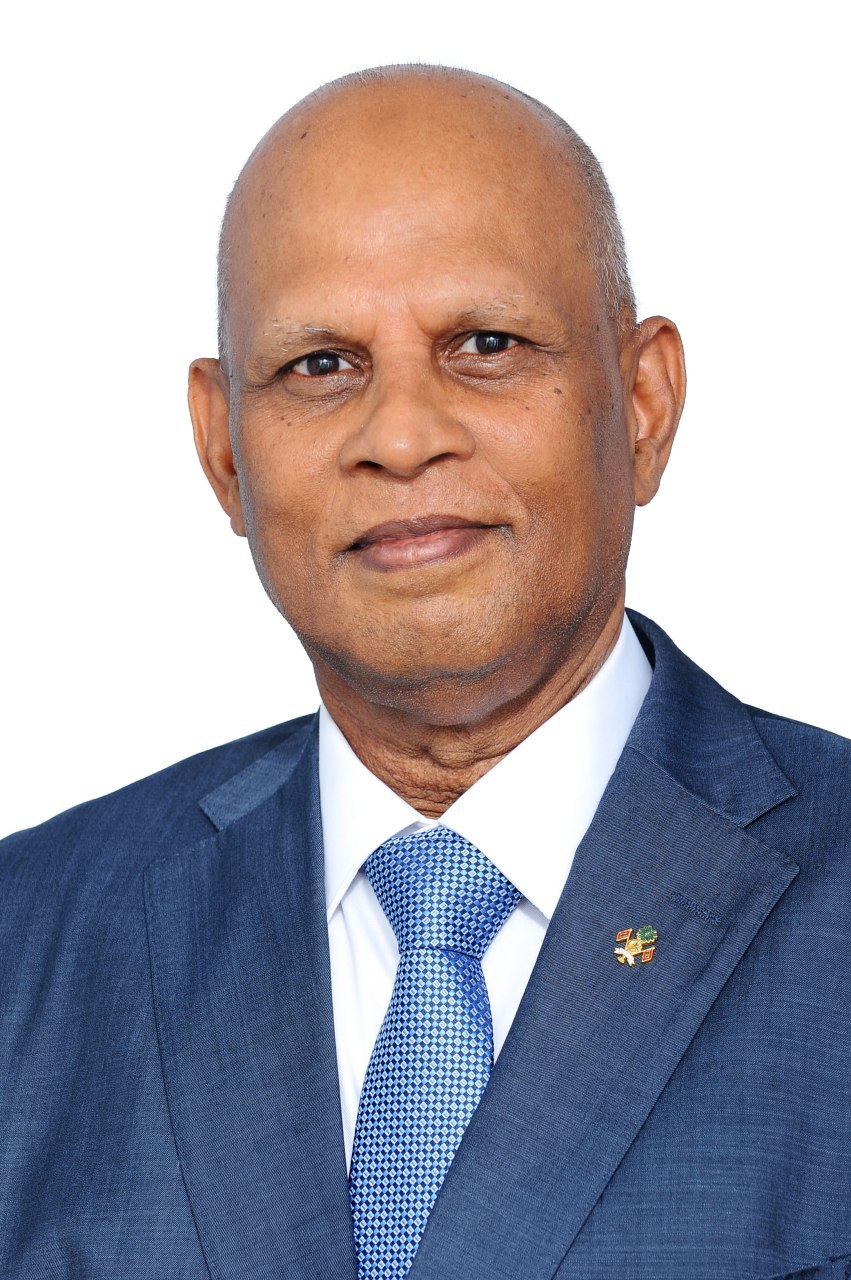
- Official portrait, 2022

Ambassador of the Maldives to Japan
- In office 8 September 2022 – 28 July 2025
- President: Ibrahim Mohamed Solih; Mohamed Muizzu
- Preceded by: Ibrahim Uvais
- Succeeded by: Ahmed Mahloof

Ambassador of the Maldives to Belgium
- In office 11 June 2019 – 30 May 2022
- President: Ibrahim Mohamed Solih
- Preceded by: Ahmed Shiaan
- Succeeded by: Omar Abdul Razzak

Ambassador of the Maldives to the European Union
- In office 22 May 2019 – 30 May 2022
- President: Ibrahim Mohamed Solih
- Preceded by: Ahmed Shiaan
- In office 2005–2007
- President: Maumoon Abdul Gayoom

High Commissioner of the Maldives to the United Kingdom
- In office 24 October 2004 – 26 September 2007
- President: Maumoon Abdul Gayoom
- Preceded by: Ahmed Zaki
- Succeeded by: Mohamed Asim

Member of the People's Majlis
- In office 24 February 2000 – 27 February 2005
- President: Maumoon Abdul Gayoom
- Speaker: Ahmed Zaki; Abdulla Hameed; Ahmed Zahir
- Constituency: North Ari Atoll

Minister of Tourism
- In office 11 November 1988 – 14 September 2004
- President: Maumoon Abdul Gayoom
- Preceded by: Ibrahim Hussain Zaki
- Succeeded by: Mustafa Lutfi

Personal details
- Born: 5 August 1951 Malé, Maldive Islands
- Died: 28 July 2025 (aged 73) Hulhumalé, Maldives
- Resting place: Galolhu Cemetery, Galolhu, Malé, Maldives
- Spouse: Aminath Nasheeda
- Children: 2
- Education: Majeediyya School
- Alma mater: International Statistics Programme Center

Hassan Sobir NIIV (Dhivehi: ޙަސަން ޞާބިރު; 5 August 1951 – 28 July 2025) was a Maldivian politician and diplomat who served as the Ambassador of the Maldives to Japan from 2023 until his death in 2025. He also served as the Minister of Tourism, Minister of Fisheries and Agriculture, and other positions.

== Education ==
Sobir had a General Certificate of Education from Majeediyya School, Bachelors of Commerce in India, and a Diploma in Statistics and Surveys from the International Statistics Programme Center in Washington, D.C.

== Career ==
Sobir started his public service on 7 February 1973 within the National Planning Agency, later shifting to the Ministry of Planning and Development. He also brought the first computer in the Maldives. In 1993, he was appointed the Minister of Fisheries and Agriculture in the administration of Maumoon Abdul Gayoom.

He later served as the Minister of Tourism in the same administration from 1998 to 2004. During his time as Minister of Tourism, he coined the famous motto 'The Sunny Side of Life'.

Sobir was also the first chairman of the Maldives Water and Sewerage Company.

He also served as a member of the People's Majlis for the North Ari Atoll constituency from 2000 to 2005.

From 2004 to 2007, he served as the High Commissioner of the Maldives to the United Kingdom.

In 2006, he was appointed the Permanent Representative of the Maldives to the United Nations at Geneva.

From 2005 to 2007, he was the non-resident Ambassador of the Maldives to the European Union (EU).

From 2007 to 2008, he was the High Commissioner of the Maldives to Singapore.

In 2019, he was appointed by President Ibrahim Mohamed Solih as the Ambassador of the Maldives to Belgium and the European Union. He presented his letter of credence to King Philippe of Belgium on 11 June and to EU council president Donald Tusk on 22 May.

On 30 May 2022, he was appointed by President Solih as the Ambassador of the Maldives to Japan and he presented his letter of credence to Japanese emperor Naruhito on 8 September. He served as the Ambassador to Japan until his death.

== Personal life and death ==
Sobir was married to Aminath Nasheeda and had two children, a son and daughter.

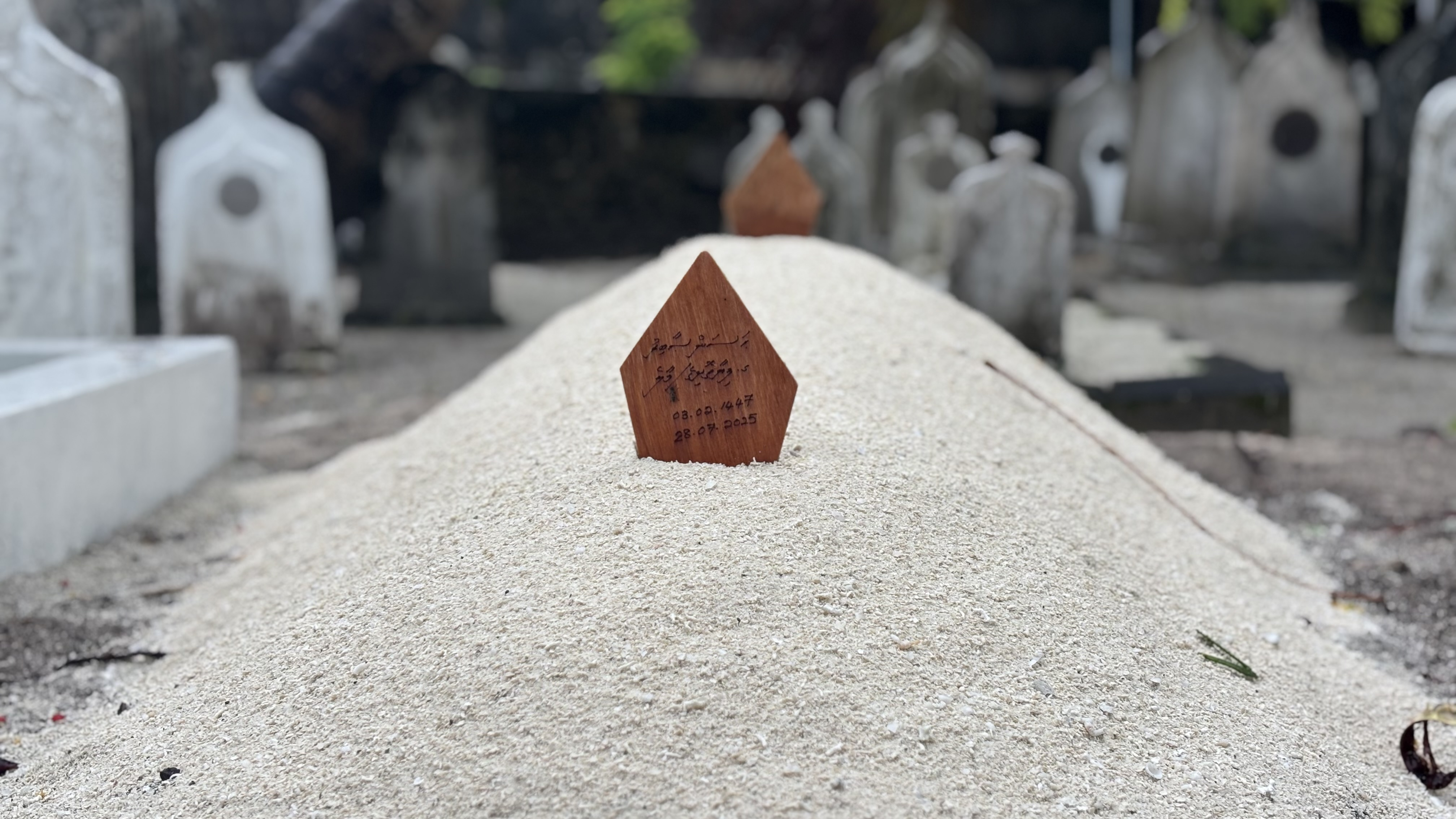
Hassan Sobir's tomb

On 28 July 2025, Sobir died in Tree Top Hospital, Hulhumalé, while he was undergoing treatment for cancer. President Mohamed Muizzu expressed condolences and ordered the flag to be lowered to half-mast for three days. A state funeral was held on Monday evening after Asr prayer at the Islamic Centre and he was laid to rest at Galolhu cemetery in Galolhu, Malé.

== Awards ==
On 27 July 2025, President Mohamed Muizzu awarded the Order of Izzuddin to Sobir but the award was accepted by his daughter, as he was unable to attend due to declining health.
