= Haveeru Daily =

Defunct daily newspaper in the Maldives

Haveeru
- Logo
- Type: Daily newspaper
- Format: Tabloid size
- Owner: Mohamed Zahir Hussain
- Founded: 1 January 1979
- Ceased publication: 2 February 2016
- Language: Dhivehi and English
- Headquarters: Malé, Maldives
- Website: www.haveeru.com.mv

Haveeru Daily (Dhivehi: ހަވީރު ނޫސް) was a Maldivian daily newspaper which was the longest serving daily newspaper in the Maldives, from 1979 until it ceased publication in 2016.

== Name ==
The name Haveeru symbolises the onset of the cool evening time after the heat of the day, which is also the time when the newspaper is brought out. In Dhivehi literature, "haveeru kurun" means the get-together of poets and writers for literary exchanges.

== History ==
Recognizing the need to fill the gap after Moonlight ceased publication, Haveeru was registered on 9 December 1978, the same day the former newspaper ceased publication. The first issue was published on 1 January 1979 under Mohamed Zahir Hussain's leadership and was edited by Abdulla Sodiq.

In 1983, Haveeru News Agency was established by three former staff members, Farooq Hassan, Ibrahim Rasheed Moosa, and Mohamed Naeem. In 1985, a dispute arose due to copyright and assets and a court ruled that Mohamed Zahir Hussain was the owner of the paper.

Haveeru is the first newspaper to be printed by offset. It was the first newspaper to link up with a foreign news agency. In 1985, it linked up with Kuwait News Agency, Agence France-Presse in 1992, and Reuters in 1994.

In 1985, Haveeru began using Thaana typewriters and word processors, becoming the first newspaper to be computerised.

In May 1998, Haveeru established Haveeru Addu Bureau in Feydhoo, the first regional news centre by a Maldives newspaper.

In 2013, Haveeru Media Group was founded by Hussain's three children, Lubna Mohamed Zahir Hussain, Leena Mohamed Zahir Hussain and Vaail Mohamed Zahir Hussain who became the owners of the newspaper.

In 2016, the offices of Haveeru suffered an arson attack.

== Court battle ==
In 2014, the ownership of Haveeru was challenged in the Civil Court where they ruled that Abdulla Farooq Hassan, Ibrahim Rasheed Moosa, and Mohamed Naeem did not have any shares in Haveeru and that it was the property of Mohamed Zahir Hussain.

In 2015, the High Court overturned the ruling and ordered that Abdulla Farooq Hassan, Ibrahim Rasheed Moosa and Mohamed Naeem have the same amount of shares since they four along with Mohamed Zahir Hussain founded the company. Some called the ruling "politically motivated".

In 2016, the Civil Court issued an order for a temporary halt to Haveeru's operations on Thursday in response to a lawsuit filed by Farooq and Ibrahim Rasheed. This led to Haveeru shutting down its online news website as well as all other branches of the company. They sent a letter to Haveeru chairman Mohamed Zahir Hussain saying that they needed to comply with the order so that the trial remains fair and just. Haveeru stated that the court order only applied to the print edition and not to the online version. The court had also ordered Haveeru to pay Farooq and Ibrahim Rasheed one fourth of the profit made by the company to date, each. After halting operations on both Haveeru Online and the magazine, public outcry was met with people standing with Haveeru along with high profile opposition figures lambasting at Yameen's government for increasing attacks on media freedom. The Maldivian Democratic Party said in a statement “This is evidence of the government’s influence in judiciary and its atrocity," read in Dhivehi.

In 2019, the High Court overturned the Civil Court's 2016 ruling and ordered a retrial. Hussain later appealed at the Supreme Court which originally stated that an appeal was not necessary but later accepted his appeal.

The Supreme Court ruled to uphold the Civil Court's 2014 verdict that Farooq, Naseem and Rasheed don't have any shares in Haveeru or any of its subsidiaries and that its the sole property of Dr. Zahir. The Maldives Journalists Association (MJA) congratulated Haveeru for winning the case and hoped that they would unleash its archives of news to the general public.

=== Staff Media Ban ===
On 3 July 2016, the Civil Court delivered a verdict over a legal dispute over the ownership of Haveeru, barring all employees from working at a media outlet in the country for two years. The verdict was delivered by Judge Mohamed Haleem, which could have forced the closure of the Mihaaru newspaper, which was set up in May by former journalists of Haveeru who resigned in mass after Haveeru was forced to shut down. The verdict had sparked public outcry and condemnation and has been described as a violation of the constitution article 37(a). The Reporters Without Borders slammed the government for its continued obstruction of critical and independent media. The Maldivian Democratic Party stated that the ban was a mockery of justice and criticized Yameen's government as being an obstacle to reforming and ensuring the freedom of judiciary.

The ex-Haveeru staff had sought to overturn the verdict delivered by the court and state attorneys appealed to the High Court to overturn the two year ban. The High Court also ordered Hussain, to join the two appeals being heard by the appellate court. The High Court declined the appeal from the former Haveeru staff as Husnu Al Suood, the lawyer representing them, did not inform the court he would be out of town.
