= Abdul Rasheed Hussain =

Maldivian historian

Abdul Rasheed Hussain NIIV
- ޢަބްދުއްރަޝީދު ޙުސައިން
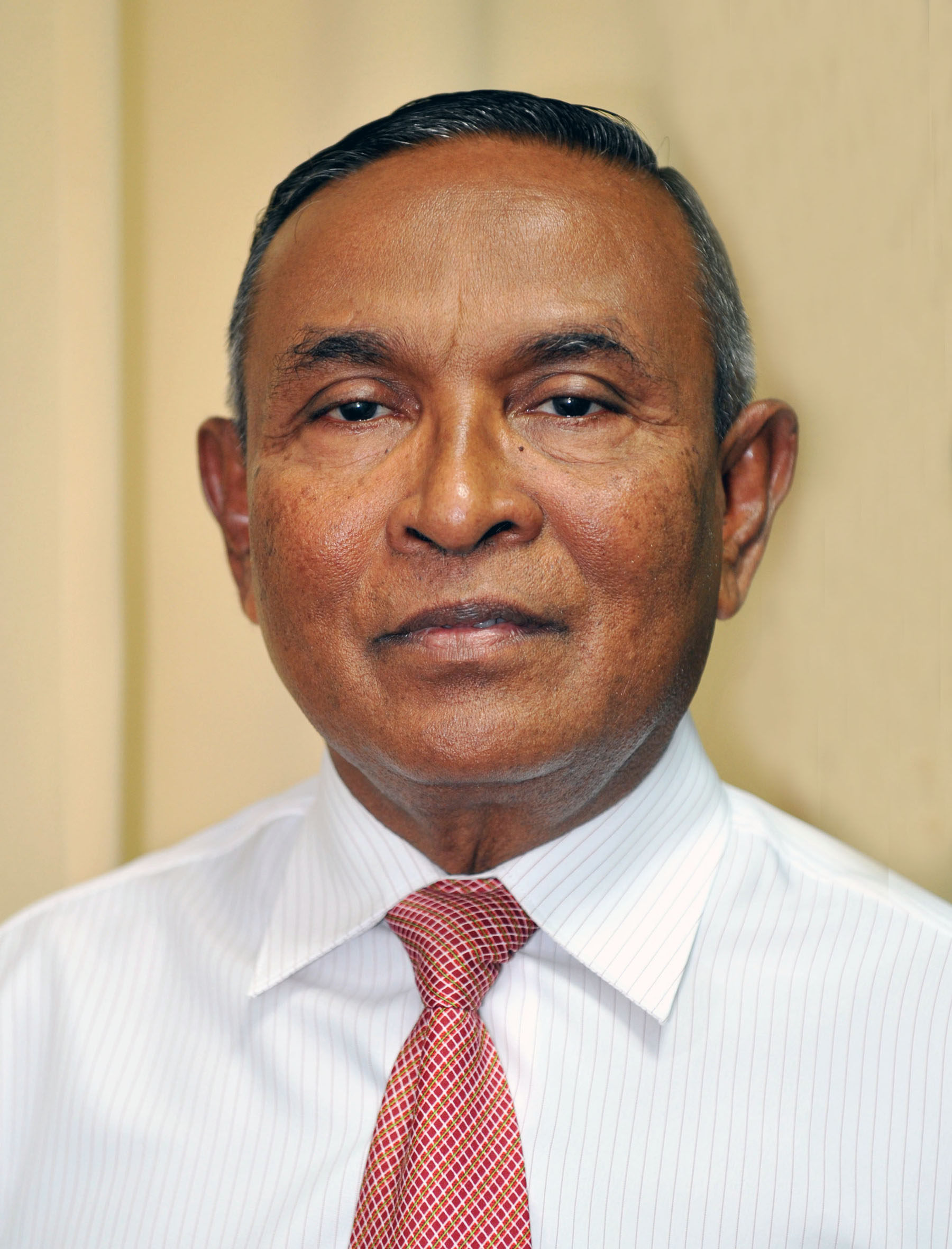
- Hussain in 2012

Deputy Speaker of the People's Majlis
- In office 2000–2005
- President: Maumoon Abdul Gayoom
- Speaker: Ahmed Zahir
- Succeeded by: Aneesa Ahmed
- Constituency: Haddhunmathi

Minister of Planning, Human Resources and Environment
- In office 6 November 1996 – 11 November 1998
- President: Maumoon Abdul Gayoom
- Succeeded by: Ismail Shafeeu

Personal details
- Born: Dhiggaru, Maldives

Abdul Rasheed Hussain, NIIV (Dhivehi: ޢަބްދުއްރަޝީދު ޙުސައިން) is a Maldivian historian, linguist and poet, who served many ministerial positions during the Gayoom administration.

== Career ==
Hussain started government service in 1968 as a spokesperson for the government hospital. He also served as the Deputy Minister of Planning and National Development as well as an advisor to the president.

His first cabinet portfolio was as the Minister of Atolls Administration in 1993. In addition, he has filled other cabinet positions such as Minister of Employment and Labour, Minister of Planning, Human Resources and Environment, Minister of Fisheries, Agriculture and Marine Resources, and Minister for Higher Education, Employment and Social Security. He also served in the People's Majlis for over 20 years and served as the Deputy Speaker from 2000 to 2005.

Hussain also served as a member in many government committees. He was the chairman of the national awards committee, board member of the Dhivehi Language Academy, and more.

In 2006, Hussain received the public service award for his contributions to Dhivehi literature.

On 27 July 2013, Abdul Rasheed Hussain was awarded the Most Honourable Order of Distinguished Rule of Izzudheen, the second highest honour conferred by the Maldivian State.
