= Ahmed Inaz =

Maldivian politician

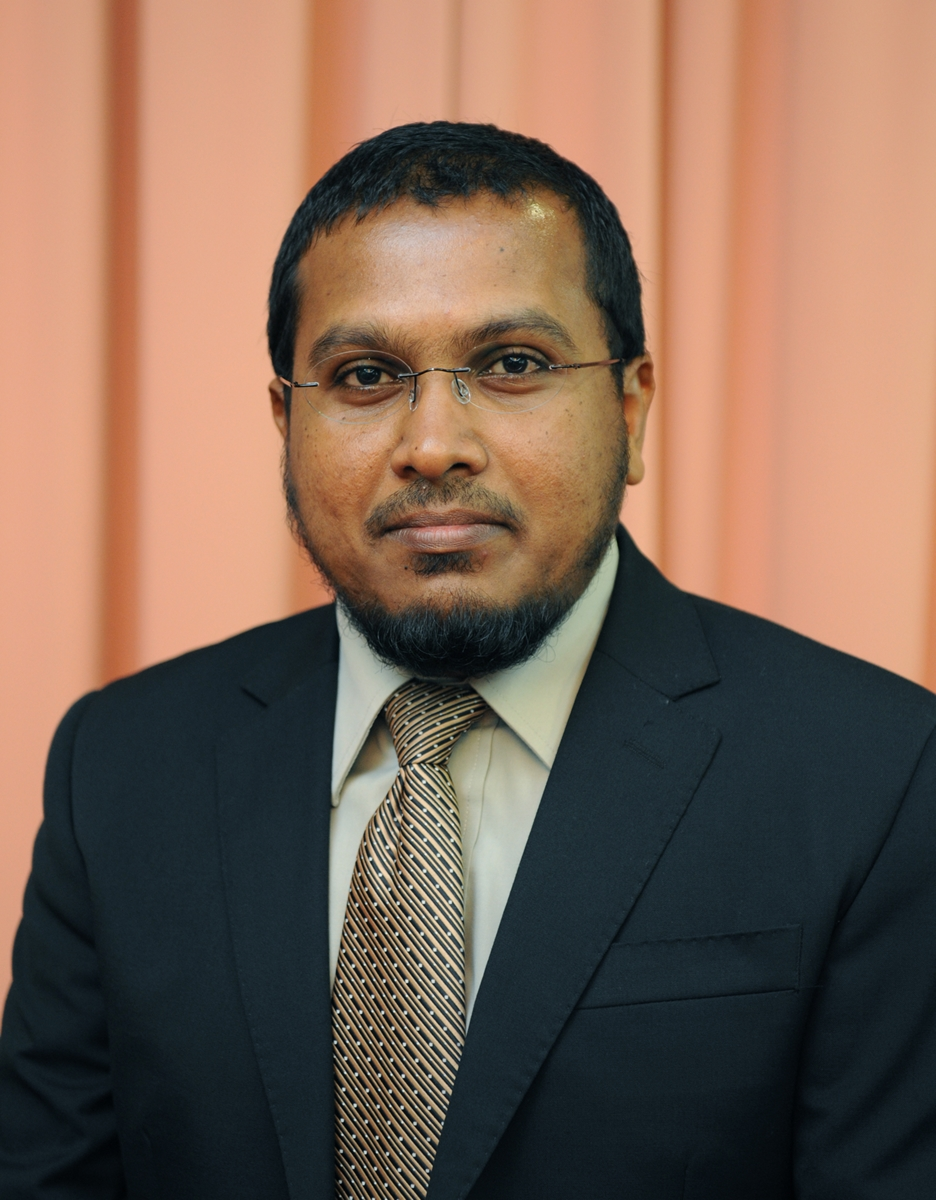
- Official portrait, 2011

Minister of Finance
- In office 10 April 2011 – 29 December 2011
- President: Mohamed Nasheed
- Preceded by: Ali Hashim; Mahmood Razee (Acting)
- Succeeded by: Mohamed Aslam (acting); Mohamed Shihab

Personal details
- Education: National University of Singapore; University of Westminster; University of Manchester

Ahmed Inaz is a Maldivian economist, and former Minister of Finance in the MDP government from April 2011 to December 2011. He was a member of the Maldivian Democratic Party, but resigned in February 2012 and has served as a Director in Planning Ministry during the presidency of former President Maumoon Abdul Gayoom. He resigned from the post of Finance Minister after MDP militant activists assaulted him after meeting an opposition leader.

Ahmed Inaz completed his first Degree in Economics at National University of Singapore. He finished his master's degree in economics at University of Westminster and a second Masters in Development Economics and Policy at University of Manchester. His career started as a Bank Supervision Officer at the Central Bank of the Maldives (Maldives Monetary Authority). Inaz is a strong advocate of inclusive governance, reduction of inequality, corruption and fiscal reform. After the election of President Mohamed Nasheed, Inaz held the post as Deputy Minister of Economic Development Trade and later Minister of State for Economic Development and Trade. He was instrumental in the formulation of Small and Medium Enterprises law and various subsequent policies in the Economic Development of the Maldives from 2008 to 2011. On 10 April 2011 he was sworn in as the Minister of Finance. His term of office as the Minister of Finance and Treasury, Maldives introduced major fiscal reforms such as the historical introduction of Business Profit Tax and Goods and Services Tax (GST) and the devaluation of the Rufiyaa (Maldives Currency). His office also proposed Income tax to parliament which was rejected by then the opposition. His office also proposed Fiscal Responsibility Act to the parliament, which became a law in 2012. Under his leadership in December 2011, his office formulated the universal health insurance scheme of the Maldives (Aasandha). A State owned enterprise called Aasandha pvt ltd was established in 2011 and began its services on 1 January 2012. He held several high-level posts in the previous governments. He served as a member of Privatization Committee and Higher Education Council from 2009 to 2011. He was the Deputy Director General of Ministry of Planning and National Development responsible in strategic economic planning and later served as the Trade policy coordinator at Ministry of trade and economic development.

He is also the founding member of Transparency Maldives (Chapter of Transparency International). He is a visiting lecturer of economics at local colleges for graduate and undergraduate students since 2005.
