= Lonuziyaaraiy Park =

Park in Malé, Maldives

- ލޮނުޒިޔާރަތް ޕާކް
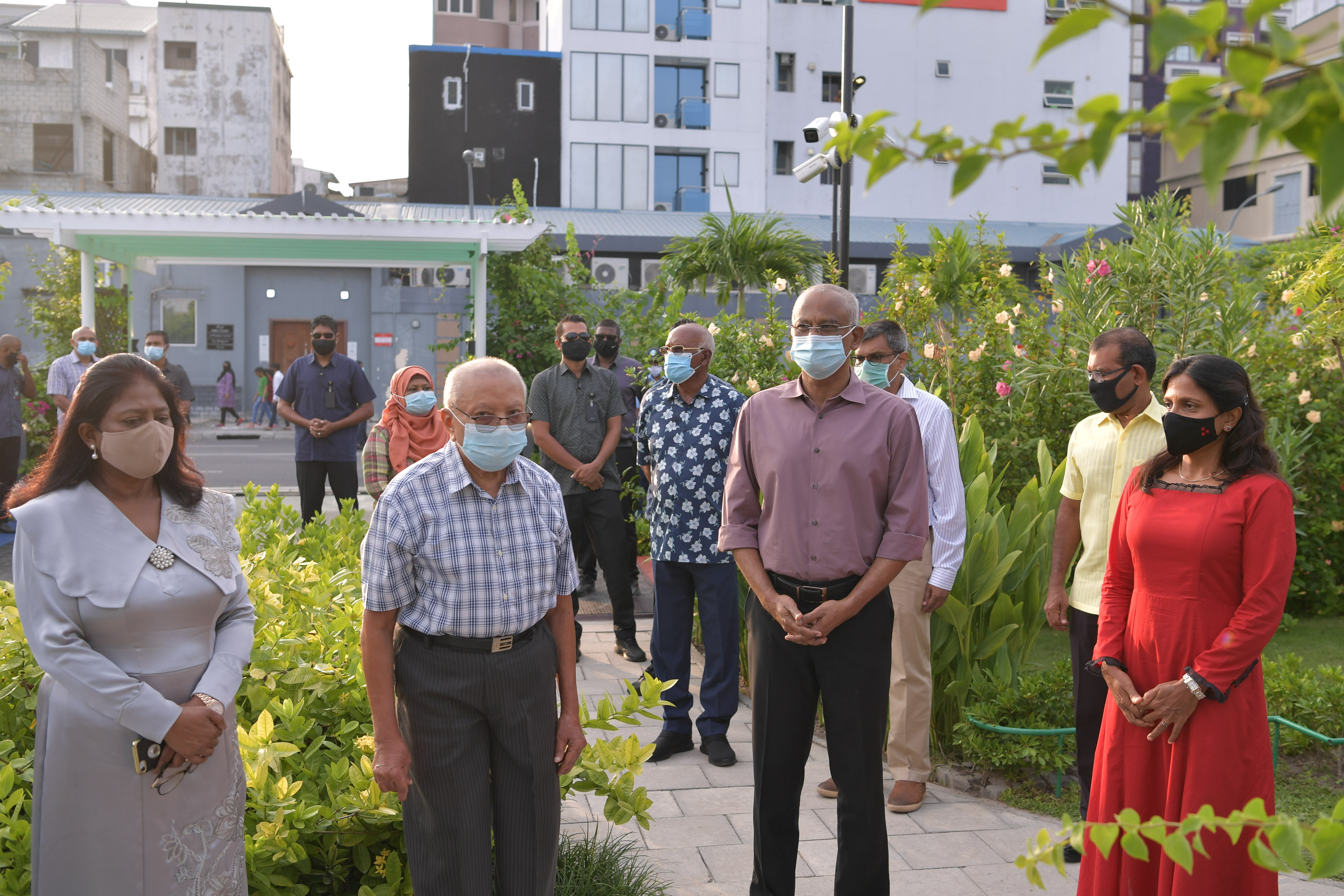
- At the event, Umar Zahir, a state official and recipient of the Order of the Distinguished Rule of Izzuddin (second from the left), ceremoniously opened Lonuziyaaraiy Park. President Solih and the first lady observed the inauguration.

- Location within Maldives
- Type: Garden
- Location: Henveiru, Malé, Maldives
- Coordinates: 4.171115°N 73.517336°E
- Area: 3 acres (1.2 ha)
- Opened: 2020
- Operator: Male' City Council
- Visitors: 50,000 per year
- Status: Open year round

Lonuziyaaraiy Park (Dhivehi: ލޮނުޒިޔާރަތް ޕާކް) is a garden located at Henveiru ward on the southeast coast of Malé, the capital of Maldives.

== History ==
In March 2019, the Male' City Council revealed its plans to create a garden park in Lonuziyaaraiy Kolhu, the area neighboring the Sinamalé Bridge. Before the construction of the bridge, Lonuziyaaraiy Kolhu was designated by the government for helicopter landings. Also, it served as a favored location for outdoor activities and family gatherings for the local population. The council has been investigated by the Anti-Corruption Commission on allegations of corruption regarding the development of public toilets in the park.

The development of the three-acre park was overseen by the Malé City Council and officially opened by Umar Zahir in the presence of President of the Maldives Ibrahim Mohamed Solih and First Lady Fazna Ahmed and other cabinet ministers on November 12, 2020. It is divided into four sections: 'Medhu Bageecha', 'Varunulaa', 'Raalhugandu', 'Uss Bageecha', and 'Maamelaameli'. The park also features a pond, small bridges, designated lanes for jogging and cycling, along with 300 benches.

An amount of MVR 16.8 million from the state budget was allocated for the development of the park, highlighting the challenge of creating a garden on land reclaimed with concrete terrain.

The Male' City Council has been under public scrutiny for its failure to adequately maintain the park.
