= Abdul Sattar Moosa Didi =

Maldivian diplomat and politician (1936–2015)

Abdul Sattar Moosa Didi NIIV
- އަބްދުއްސައްތާރު މޫސާ ދީދީ
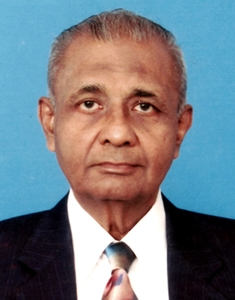
- Portrait, 2011

Minister of Education
- In office 6 January 1977 – 11 November 1978
- President: Ibrahim Nasir
- Preceded by: Mohamed Nooruddin
- Succeeded by: Mohamed Zahir Hussain

Vice President of the Maldives
- In office 10 March 1975 – 5 January 1977 Serving with: Ali Maniku; Ibrahim Shihab; Hassan Zareer; Ahmed Hilmy Didi
- President: Ibrahim Nasir

Minister of Finance
- In office 29 October 1970 – 10 March 1975
- President: Ibrahim Nasir
- Preceded by: Ibrahim Nasir
- Succeeded by: Mohamed Nooruddin

Permanent Representative of the Maldives to the United Nations
- In office 1967–1970
- Preceded by: Ahmed Hilmy Didi
- Succeeded by: Maumoon Abdul Gayoom

Representative of the Maldive Islands in Colombo
- In office 1960–1967

Personal details
- Born: 18 June 1936 Fura Malé, Sultanate of the Maldive Islands
- Died: 27 November 2015 (aged 79) Bangkok, Thailand

Abdul Sattar Moosa Didi, NIIV (Dhivehi: އަބްދުއްސައްތާރު މޫސާ ދީދީ; 18 June 1936 – 27 November 2015), also known as Amir Abdul Sattar Faamudheyri Kilegefaanu, was a Maldivian diplomat and politician. He served as many governmental ministers during his public service, eventually serving as one of the Vice Presidents of the Maldives from 1975 to 1977. He died in November 2015 in Bangkok, Thailand.

== Life ==
Didi started his public service career as secretary at the Representative Office of the Maldive Islands in Colombo in 1957. Then from 1960 to 1967 he was the representative in Ceylon. He was then Permanent Representative of the Maldives to the United Nations from 1967 to 1970, and ambassador to the USA between 1968 and 1970. In the government of President Ibrahim Nasir, he was Finance Minister from October 1970 to March 1975. From Marvch 1975 to January 1977, he was one of the Vice Presidents of the Maldives together with Ahmed Hilmy Didi, Ibrahim Shihab, Ali Maniku and Hassan Zareer.

During the tenure of Nasir's successor, Maumoon Abdul Gayoom, he was the Minister of Education from 1977 to 1978. He was later Minister for Fisheries in the 1980s and Minister for Health and Welfare in the 1990s. In 1998, Didi became chair of the council of the Maldives College of Higher Education (MCHE). During the mass demonstrations in September 2003, he chaired a presidential commission to investigate the circumstances surrounding the death of Evan Naseem, who previously died in prison with two other inmates under unexplained circumstances.

On 26 July 2011, Abdul Sattar Moosa Didi was conferred the Order of the Distinguished Rule of Izzuddin. He was also awarded the National Exemplary Service Medal for his contributions to the nation and its people.

On 25 November 2017, Dhivehi Language Academy released a book honoring Sattar's services.
