= Abdulla Jihad =

Chairperson of Maldives International Finance Service Authority since 2024

- އަބްދުﷲ ޖިހާދު
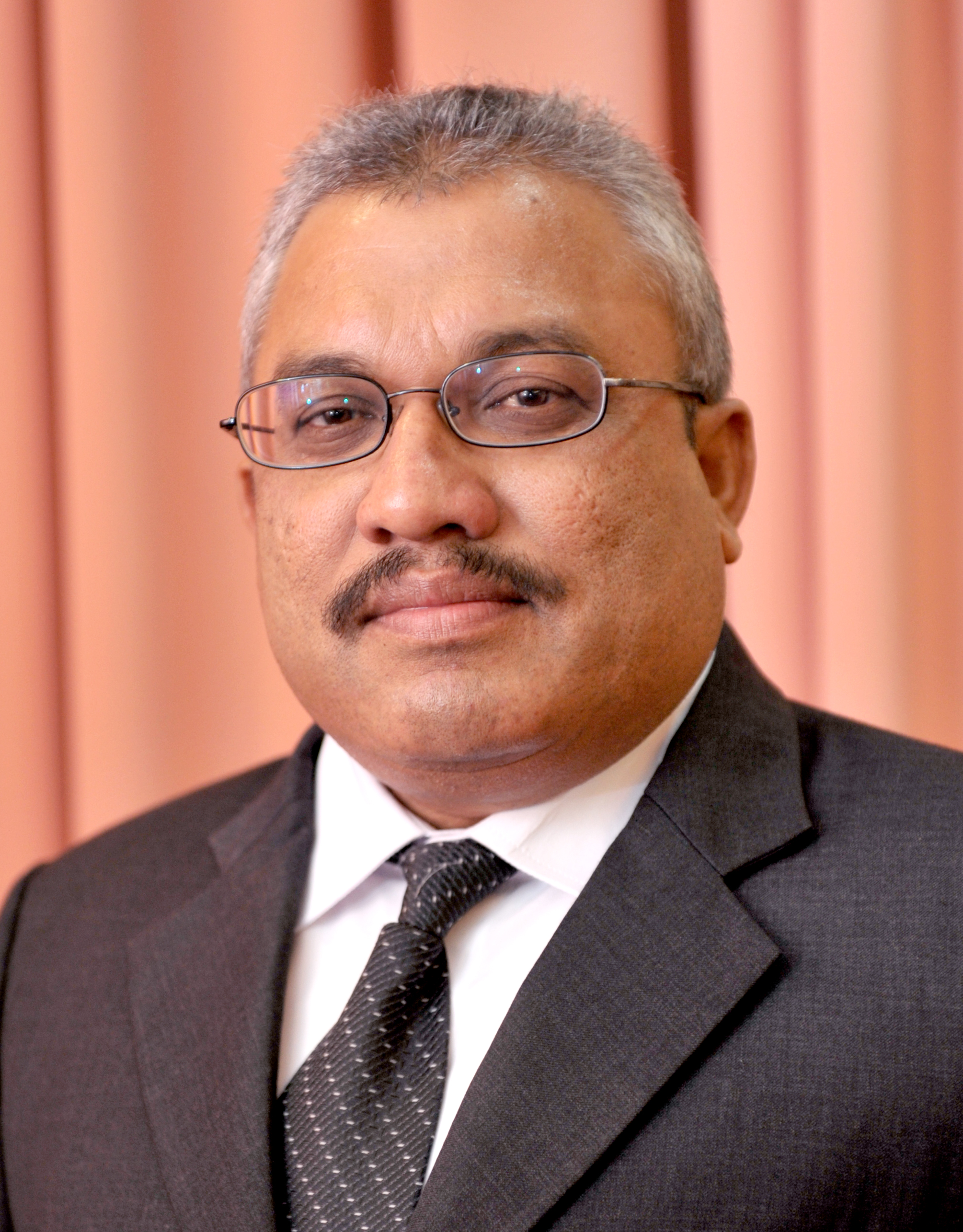
- Official portrait, 2012

Chairperson of Maldives International Finance Service Authority
- Incumbent
- Assumed office 1 May 2024
- President: Mohamed Muizzu

11th Vice President of the Maldives
- In office 22 June 2016 – 17 November 2018
- President: Abdulla Yameen
- Preceded by: Ahmed Adeeb
- Succeeded by: Faisal Naseem

Minister of Finance
- In office 5 March 2012 – 22 June 2016
- President: Mohamed Waheed Hassan; Abdulla Yameen
- Preceded by: Mohamed Shihab
- Succeeded by: Ahmed Munawar
- In office 18 August 2005 – 15 July 2008
- President: Maumoon Abdul Gayoom
- Preceded by: Qasim Ibrahim
- Succeeded by: Ali Hashim

Personal details
- Born: 3 January 1964 (age 62) Thinadhoo City, Maldives
- Party: People's National Front (2024–present)
- Other political affiliations: Progressive Party of Maldives
- Spouse: Asima Hussein
- Children: 3
- Education: University of the South Pacific; University of Waikato

Abdulla Jihad (Dhivehi: އަބްދުﷲ ޖިހާދު; born 3 January 1964) is a Maldivian politician who served as the 11th vice president of the Maldives from 22 June 2016 to 17 November 2018. Prior to his appointment on 22 June 2016, he served as the minister of finance.

== Early life and education ==
Jihad was born on 3 January 1964 in Thinadhoo City. He graduated from the University of Waikato, New Zealand, with a masters of management studies degree in economics. He also holds a Bachelor of Arts degree majoring in economics/management from the University of South Pacific, Fiji.

== Career ==
Jihad first joined government services in 1980 as a temporary audit staff at the audit office. He later went on to fill a number of prestigious managerial posts in the government. On 22 June 2016, he was appointed vice president of the republic of the Maldives by President Abdulla Yameen Abdul Gayoom.

Prior to assuming the post of vice president, Jihad served as the minister of finance and treasury in President Yameen's Administration. He had also served as the minister of finance and treasury in President Mohamed Waheed Hassan's Administration from 5 March 2012 to 17 November 2013, and in President Maumoon Abdul Gayoom's Administration from 15 July 2008 to 11 November 2008. Other notable posts he filled were governor of Maldives Monetary Authority (2007–2008), and member of the Civil Service Commission.

Jihad has attended many international conferences, seminars, workshops and training programmes and has visited numerous countries in the discharge of government responsibilities.

In May 2024, Jihad was appointed by Mohamed Muizzu as the Chairperson of the Maldives International Finance Service Authority.

== Corruption charges ==
Jihad was charged by the Prosecutor General's Office (PGO) for corruption charges relating to the Fushidhiggaru project. His charges were dismissed by the Criminal Court due to the legal mistakes made in the investigation. The state later appealed the dismissal to the High Court, but was rejected due to his address not being clear. The PGO later resubmitted the case but the court declined to hear it after missing the resubmission deadline. The case was forwarded by the PGO to the Supreme Court, later on the High Court accepted the case. Jihad was later summoned to court under police custody.

== Family life ==
Jihad is married to Asima Hussein. They have 3 children.
