= Abdulla Sodiq (disambiguation) =

Abdulla Sodiq is a Maldivian litterateur.

Abdulla Sodiq may also refer to:

- Abdulla Sodiq (politician), former mayor of Addu City, Maldives
- Abdullah Sadiq, Pakistani nuclear physicist
