= Hassan Zareer (minister) =

Maldivian government official

- ޙަސަން ޒަރީރު
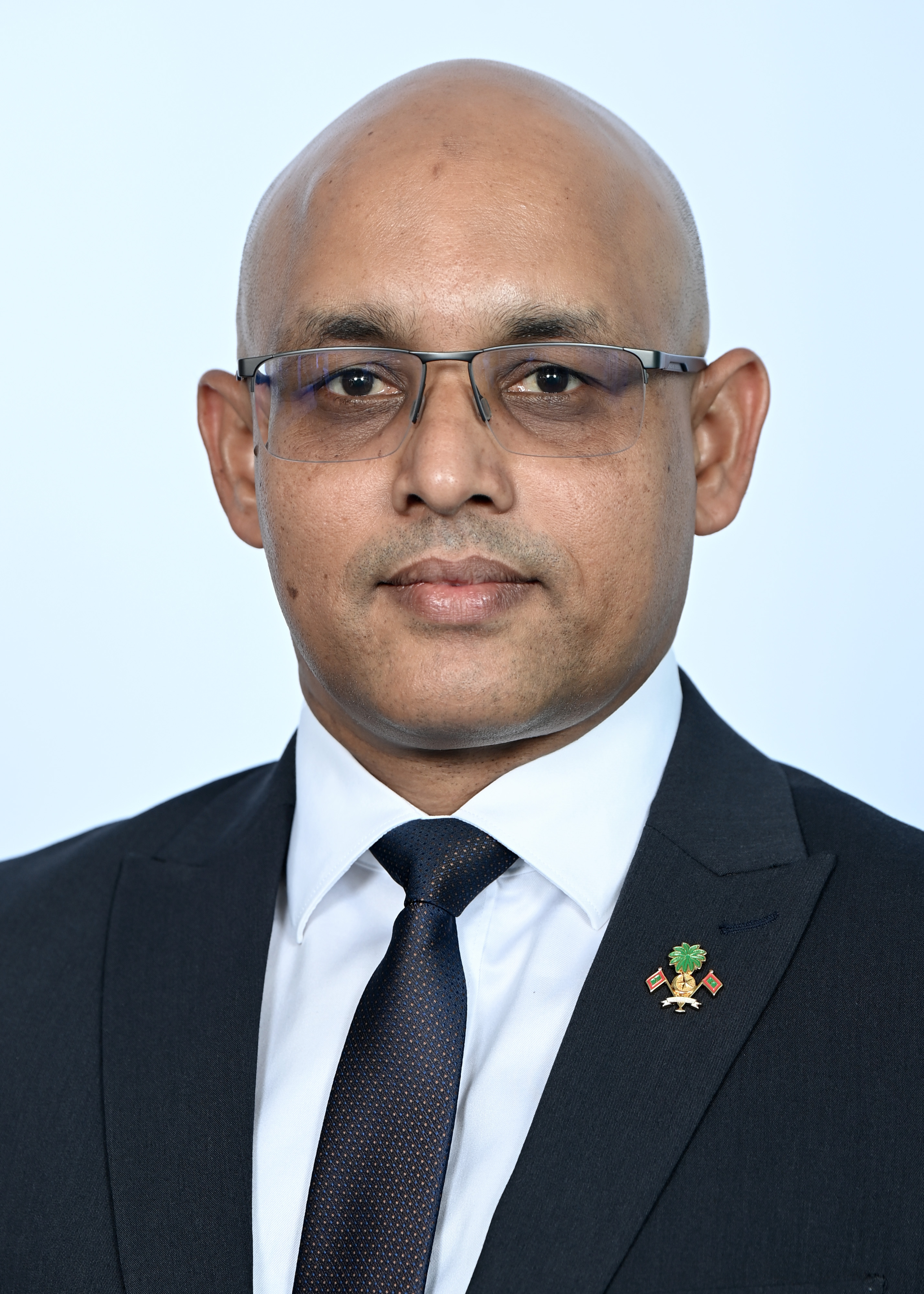
- Official portrait, 2026

Minister of Finance and Public Enterprises
- Incumbent
- Assumed office 8 June 2026
- President: Mohamed Muizzu
- Preceded by: Moosa Zameer

Personal details
- Education: International Islamic University Malaysia

Hassan Zareer (Dhivehi: ޙަސަން ޒަރީރު) is a Maldivian politician who served as the Minister of Finance and Public Enterprises of the Maldives since 2026.

He holds a Bachelor of Accounting and an MSc in Finance from the International Islamic University Malaysia.
