= Mohamed Shafeeq =

Maldivian politician

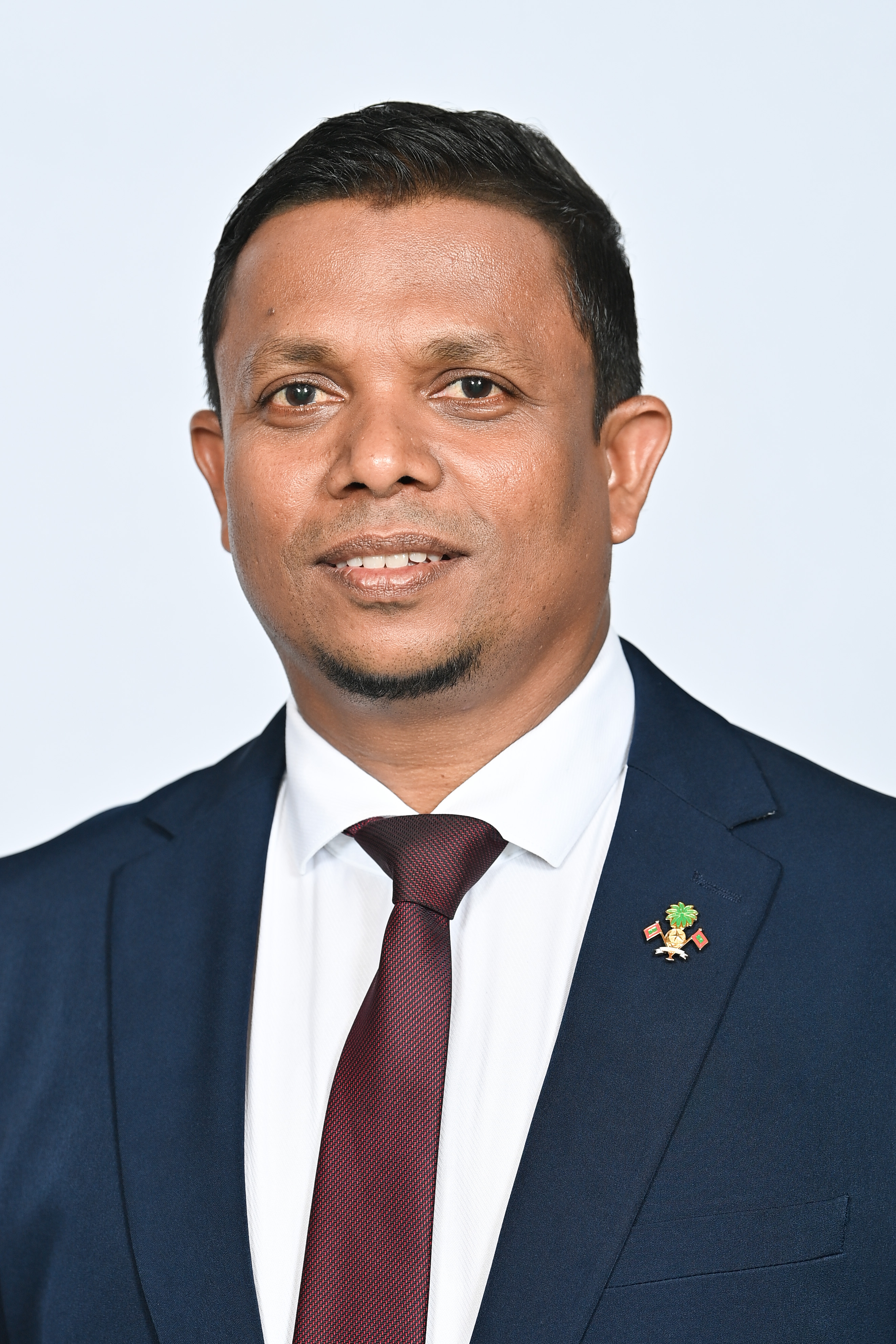

Minister of Finance of Maldives
- In office 17 November 2023 – 30 September 2024
- President: Mohamed Muizzu
- Preceded by: Ibrahim Ameer
- Succeeded by: Moosa Zameer

Chief Financial Officer of HDFC
- In office 2021–2023

Personal details
- Born: Fonadhoo, Laamu Atoll, Maldives
- Party: People's National Congress
- Education: IIC University of Technology, University of Ballarat, University of East London

Mohamed Shafeeq is a Maldivian politician. He was Finance Minister of the Maldives from 2023 until his resignation in 2024. He was the Chief Financial Officer of Housing Development Finance Corporation (HDFC). He joined the corporation in 2009, and was appointed to the post of CFO in 2021.

== Early life and education ==
He was born in Fonadhoo in Laamu Atoll, Maldives. He completed his PhD in Business Administration from the IIC University of Technology, Cambodia, via the European Institute of Professional Education in Sri Lanka. He got his Master of Business Administration from the University of Ballarat, Australia. He also holds a BA (Hons) Finance and Accounting from the University of East London, United Kingdom.

== Career ==
He was previously the Finance Director of the Society for Health Education. In 2009, he joined the Housing Development Finance Corporation (HDFC) and was appointed to the post of Chief Financial Officer in 2021. He was appointed as the Minister of Finance where he later resigned in 2024.
