= Asian Academy of Aeronautics =

Flight training academy in Maldives

The Asian Academy of Aeronautics (AAA) is a flight training academy located at Gan International Airport, Addu Atoll, Maldives. Now permanently closed due to issues faced by the school during the time of COVID-19.

A new school has been set up in Gan by Maldivian Airways and Maldives National University which will help the AAA students to finish their course.

AAA trained aviation pilots for more than 20 years with high training standards serving the general aviation industry of Asia. AAA has issued 569 pilot aircraft licenses and ratings with a fleet of 11 aircraft. It is noteworthy to state that many operational heads of present airlines in Asia and the Middle East have been trained at AAA. Until COVID-19 arose we have been training pilots every year which directly contributes to the local airlines in Maldives. 96% of students that complete their course with AAA start flying with a reputed airline within 24 months.

AAA did not face any issues with their flight training operations prior to the COVID19 pandemic. The pandemic resulted in a halt of flying training from February 2020 because of lockdowns imposed around the world. AAA was unable to import spare parts causing their aircraft to be grounded. AAA was unable to sustain financially due to the events following the Pandemic.

AAA had to seize its operations in 2020 and referred students to other flying schools.
