= Ibrahim Ameer =

Maldivian politician

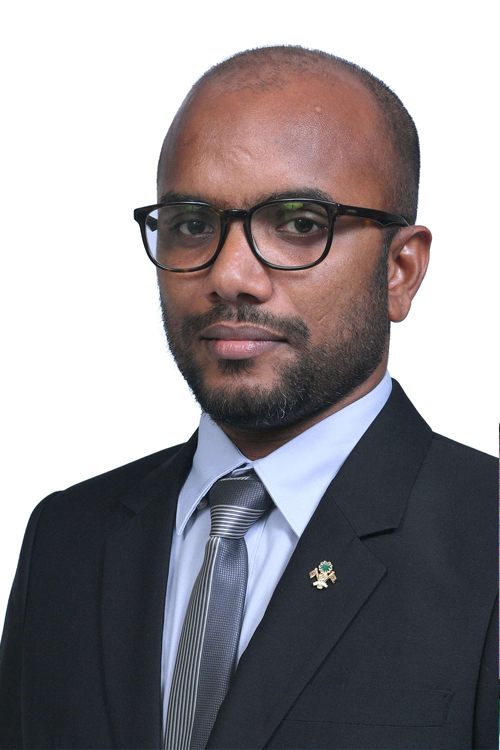

Minister of Finance
- In office 17 November 2018 – 17 November 2023
- President: Ibrahim Mohamed Solih
- Succeeded by: Mohamed Shafeeq

Personal details
- Party: Maldivian Democratic Party
- Education: University of Nebraska at Omaha

Ibrahim Ameer is a Maldivian politician. He served as the Finance Minister of the Maldives.
