= Mohamed Rasheed Ibrahim =

Former Chief Justice of the Maldives

Mohamed Rasheed Ibrahim NIIV
- މުހައްމަދު ރަޝީދު އިބްރާހިމް
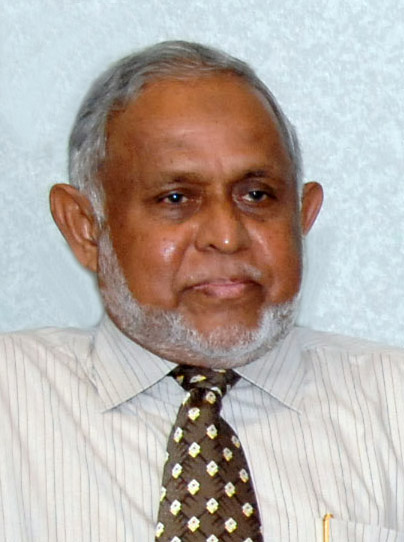
- Ibrahim in 2012

President of the Supreme Council of Fatwa
- Incumbent
- Assumed office 18 January 2017
- President: Abdulla Yameen; Ibrahim Mohamed Solih; Mohamed Muizzu
- Deputy: Abdul Sattar Abdul Rahman

Minister of Justice
- In office 1989–1993
- President: Maumoon Abdul Gayoom

Deputy Minister of Justice
- In office 1988–1989
- President: Maumoon Abdul Gayoom

Personal details
- Born: 1942 (age 83–84) Fuvahmulah, Sultanate of the Maldive Islands
- Education: Al-Azhar University; Islamic University of Maldives

Mohamed Rasheed Ibrahim NIIV (born 1942) is a Maldivian politician, lawyer, and former judge who served as the Qazi of the Maldives. He also served as the Minister of Justice and Deputy Minister of Justice.

== Early life and education ==
Ibrahim is from Fuvahmulah. He studied at Fadiya School in his island before moving to South India where he attended the College of the Righteous. He later attended Al-Azhar University, where he received his elementary certificate, secondary school certificate, secondary school diploma, master’s degree in comparative jurisprudence, and a general diploma in education. He also received his Doctor of Philosophy from the Islamic University of Maldives.

== Career ==
Ibrahim served as a teacher at Abi Ubaidah School, professor and a lecturer at the Imam Mohammad Ibn Saud Islamic University. He also served as a Special Advisor to the President, Special Undersecretary to the President from 1985 to 1988, Deputy Minister of Justice from 1988 to 1989, Minister of Justice from 1989 to 1993, Chief Justice of the Maldives, and the President of the Supreme Council for Islamic Affairs.

He was also appointed as a member of the Sharia Council of the Islamic Fiqh Academy in 2012. As well as an advisor to the Minister of Islamic Affairs in 2014.

In 2017, he was appointed as the President of the Supreme Council of Fatwa.

Ibrahim also served as a member of the People's Majlis.

== Awards ==
In 2008, Ibrahim was awarded the Order of Izzuddin by President Maumoon Abdul Gayoom.
