= The Maumoon Foundation =

Malé-based nonprofit organization founded in 2010

- Logo used since 2024
- Abbreviation: TMF
- Formation: 26 January 2010; 16 years ago
- Founder: Maumoon Abdul Gayoom
- Type: Nonprofit
- Headquarters: 5th floor, Fulidhooge, Henveiru, Malé, Maldives
- Chairperson: Maumoon Abdul Gayoom
- Key people: Maumoon Abdul Gayoom (Chairman); Abdullah Kamaludeen (CEO)
- Website: maumoonfoundation.org

The Maumoon Foundation is a Malé-based nonprofit organization founded in 2010, by Maumoon Abdul Gayoom, the 3rd president of the Maldives.

== History and activities ==
The Maumoon Foundation was established on 26 January 2010 by Maumoon Abdul Gayoom, former president of the Maldives. It aims to improve the livelihoods of the Maldivian people through various programs. The foundation operates as an apolitical, not-for-profit charitable organization, focusing on areas of interest that Gayoom supported during his presidency.

In January 2026, Gayoom appointed Abdullah Kamaludeen at the CEO of the foundation. An agreement had also been signed between the foundation and the Ministry of Islamic Affairs to renovate the Islamic Centre.

In February 2026, Gayoom announced at the foundation's annual general meeting that he'll be establishing a presidential library and archive of his presidency.

== Scholarships and programs ==
In June 2018, the foundation announced it had begun a scholarship program at the Garden City University in Bangalore, India. Prior it, the foundation offered 80 scholarships in 20 different fields at the Garden City University in 2017.
