= Abdullah Kamaludeen =

Maldivian politician

Abdulla Kamaludeen NIIV
- ޢަބްދުﷲ ކަމާލުއްދީން
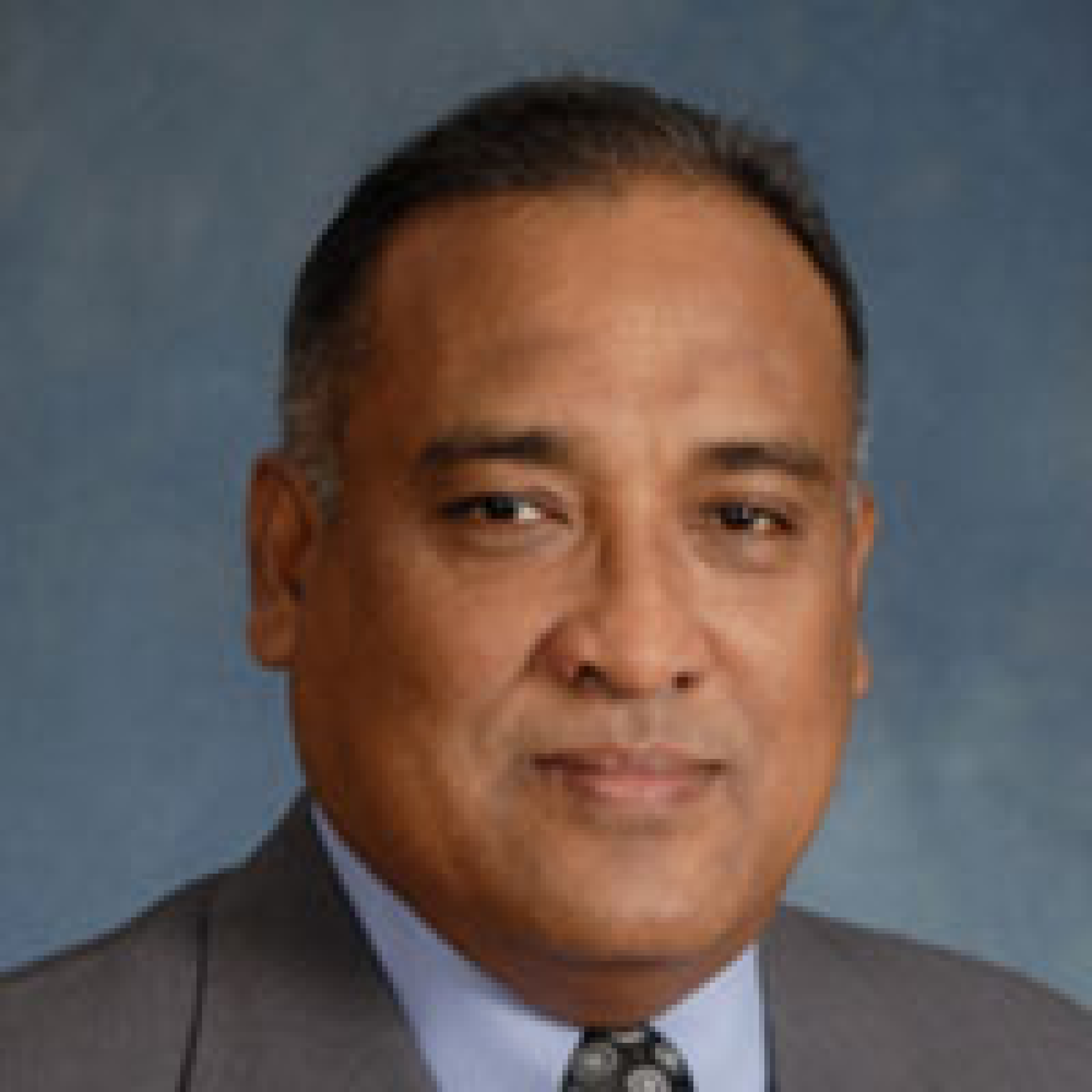
- Kamaludeen in 2007

Minister of Home Affairs
- In office 25 June 2007 – 12 November 2008
- President: Maumoon Abdul Gayoom
- Preceded by: Ahmed Thasmeen Ali
- Succeeded by: Qasim Ibrahim

Personal details
- Party: Independent (2021–present)
- Other political affiliations: Maldives Reform Movement (2019–2021); Jumhooree Party (2012–2018); Progressive Party of Maldives (2011–2012); Dhivehi Rayyithunge Party (2005–2011)

Abdullah Kamaludeen (Note: Also spelled as Abdulla Kamaludeen, Kamaluddin, Kamaluddin, or Kamaluhdheen), NIIV (Dhivehi: ޢަބްދުﷲ ކަމާލުއްދީން) is a Maldivian politician who served as the minister of home affairs from 2007 to 2008. He currently serves as the chief executive officer of the Maumoon Foundation since 2026.

== Career ==
Kamaludeen served in many ministerial positions during the presidency of Maumoon Abdul Gayoom for 15 years. He served as the minister of home affairs from 2007 until Gayoom's presidency was over in November 2008. In 2008, President Gayoom awarded Kamaludeen the Order of Izzuddin. Kamaludeen was one of the members of the Dhivehi Rayyithunge Party (DRP), before he left the party along with Gayoom and was one of the founding members of the Progressive Party of Maldives (PPM). He later joined the Jumhooree Party (JP) in 2012 and was one of the deputy leaders before leaving the party in 2018 to support Maumoon Abdul Gayoom. Abdulla later became a member of the Maldives Reform Movement (MRM), a party founded by Gayoom.

In 2019, he ran for the 2019 parliamentary election for the Fonadhoo consstituency being backed by Gayoom, but lost and only receiving 102 votes.

In 2021, Kamaludeen left MRM to create his own party. He released a statement saying that "a new party is needed to prioritize Islam, maintain the sovereignty of the nation, empower citizens, and strengthen community wellness". He revealed the party's name to be "National Solidarity Party" and submitted it to the Elections Commission (EC). The EC rejected it and nulled his request as it still listed him as a member of the MRM. The MRM filed a request to the EC to remove Kamaludeen from the party register. Kamaludeen later resubmitted his application and later received the go-ahead to form the party.

In January 2026, Gayoom appointed Kamaludeen as the chief executive officer of the Maumoon Foundation.
