= Ministry of Finance and Public Enterprises =

Government ministry of the Maldives

- މާލީކަންކަމާއި ސަރުކާރު ކުންފުނިތަކާ ބެހޭ ވުޒާރާ Maaleekankamaai Sarukaaru Kunfunithakaa Behey Vuzaaraa

Agency overview
- Formed: 1932
- Jurisdiction: Government of the Maldives
- Headquarters: Ameenee Magu, Block 379, Malé, Maldives
- Minister responsible: Moosa Zameer
- Deputy Ministers responsible: Ahmed Saaid Musthafa; Ahmed Aiman; Hassan Miras; Mohamed Anas; Ahmed Ajwed; Athuhar Ibrahim Rasheed
- Agency executives: Hussain Sham Adam, Minister of State for Finance; Ahmed Mazin, Minister of State for Finance; Zidna Ibrahim, Minister of State for Finance; Anas Abdul Sattar, Minister of State for Finance; Ahmed Naseer & Ahmed Munawar, Advisors to the Minister of Finance; Mohamed Faizal, Secretary General; Mohamed Azad, Account General; Ahmed Siraj, Permanent Secretary; Fathimath Salaha, Chief Internal Auditor
- Website: finance.gov.mv

The Ministry of Finance and Public Enterprises (Dhivehi: މާލީކަންކަމާއި ސަރުކާރު ކުންފުނިތަކާ ބެހޭ ވުޒާރާ) is the ministry responsible for managing the public finances, national development planning, and statistics of the Maldives.

== History ==
The Finance Ministry was established in 1932 under the Arabic name Vuzaaraathul Maaliyya to handle the Sultanate of the Maldives' financial affairs. It was renamed to the Ministry of Finance and Planning in 2024. In 2026, it was renamed the Ministry of Finance and Public Enterprises.

=== Ministers ===
No.	Portrait	Name (born-died)	Term			Political party	Government	Ref.
No.	Portrait	Name (born-died)	Took office	Left office	Time in office	Political party	Government	Ref.
Bodu Ban’deyri
1	Abdul Majeed Rannaban’deyri Kileygefaanu	Abdul Majeed Rannaban’deyri Kileygefaanu (1873–1952)	11 March 1903	14 October 1932	29 years, 217 days	?	Shamsuddeen III	
Vazeerul Maaliyya Mahukamathul Maaliyya ge Veriya
2	Hassan Fareed Didi	Hassan Fareed Didi (1901–1944)	22 December 1932	18 January 1942	9 years, 27 days	?	Shamsuddeen III; Nooraddeen II	
Mahukamathul Maaliyya ge Veriya
3	Mohamed Amin Didi	Mohamed Amin Didi (1910–1954)	18 January 1942	22 April 1951	9 years, 94 days	?	Nooraddeen II; Abdul Majeed Didi	
Vazeerul Maaliyya
3	Mohamed Amin Didi	Mohamed Amin Didi (1910–1954)	22 April 1951	31 December 1952	1 year, 253 days	?	Abdul Majeed Didi	
4	Ibrahim Muhammad Didi	Ibrahim Muhammad Didi (1902–1981)	12 July 1954	27 November 1955	1 year, 138 days	?	Muhammad Fareed Didi	
5	Ibrahim Faamulaadheyri Kileygefaanu	Ibrahim Faamulaadheyri Kileygefaanu (1889–1975)	27 November 1955	11 November 1968	12 years, 350 days	?	Muhammad Fareed Didi	
6	Ibrahim Nasir	Ibrahim Nasir (1926–2008)	14 December 1957	11 November 1968	10 years, 333 days	?	Muhammad Fareed Didi	
Minister of Finance
7	Abdul Sattar Moosa Didi	Abdul Sattar Moosa Didi (1936–2015)	29 October 1970	10 March 1975	4 years, 132 days	?	Ibrahim Nasir	
8	Mohamed Nooruddin	Mohamed Nooruddin	7 July 1976	11 November 1978	2 years, 127 days	?	Ibrahim Nasir	
Head of Department of Finance
9	Maumoon Abdul Gayoom	Maumoon Abdul Gayoom (born 1937)	11 November 1978	12 December 1988	10 years, 31 days	?	Maumoon	
Minister of Finance
9	Maumoon Abdul Gayoom	Maumoon Abdul Gayoom (born 1937)	5 January 1989	11 November 1993	4 years, 310 days	?	Maumoon	
Minister of Finance and Treasury
9	Maumoon Abdul Gayoom	Maumoon Abdul Gayoom (born 1937)	11 November 1978	12 December 1988	10 years, 31 days	?	Maumoon	
Minister of Finance
9	Maumoon Abdul Gayoom	Maumoon Abdul Gayoom (born 1937)	11 November 1993	1 September 2004	10 years, 295 days	?	Maumoon	
10	Arif Hilmy	Arif Hilmy	11 November 1993	31 May 2000	10 years, 202 days	?	Maumoon	
11	Mohamed Jaleel	Mohamed Jaleel	1 September 2004	14 July 2005	316 days	?	Maumoon	
12	Qasim Ibrahim	Qasim Ibrahim (born 1951)	18 August 2005	15 July 2008	2 years, 335 days	JP	Maumoon	
13	Abdulla Jihad	Abdulla Jihad (born 1964)	15 July 2008	11 November 2008	119 days	?	Maumoon	
13	Ali Hashim	Ali Hashim	12 November 2008	28 June 2010	1 year, 228 days	?	Nasheed	
13	Ali Hashim	Ali Hashim	7 July 2010	12 December 2010	158 days	?	Nasheed	
-	Mahmood Razee	Mahmood Razee; Acting	December 2010	10 April 2011	119 days	?	Nasheed	
14	Ahmed Inaz	Ahmed Inaz	10 April 2011	29 December 2011	263 days	?	Nasheed	
-	Mohamed Aslam	Mohamed Aslam; Acting	2 January 2012	4 January 2012	2 days	MDP	Nasheed	
15	Mohamed Shihab	Mohamed Shihab (born 1957)	4 January 2012	8 February 2012	35 days	MDP	Nasheed	
16	Abdulla Jihad	Abdulla Jihad (born 1964)	5 March 2012	22 June 2016	4 years, 109 days	PPM	Waheed; Yameen	
17	Ahmed Munawar	Ahmed Munawar	22 June 2016	15 November 2018	2 years, 146 days	?	Yameen	
18	Ibrahim Ameer	Ibrahim Ameer	17 November 2018	17 November 2023	5 years, 0 days	MDP	Solih	
19	Mohamed Shafeeq	Mohamed Shafeeq	17 November 2023	30 September 2024	318 days	PNC	Muizzu	
20	Moosa Zameer	Moosa Zameer	30 September 2024	26 December 2024	87 days	PNC	Muizzu	
Minister of Finance and Planning
20	Moosa Zameer	Moosa Zameer	26 December 2024	14 April 2026	1 year, 109 days	PNC	Muizzu	
Minister of Finance and Public Enterprises
20	Moosa Zameer	Moosa Zameer	14 April 2026	Incumbent	55 days	PNC	Muizzu	
21	Hassan Zareer	Hassan Zareer	8 June 2026	Incumbent	61 days	?	Muizzu	
