= Ali Maniku =

Maldivian civil servant (died 2015)

Ali Maniku NIIV
- ޢަލީ މަނިކު
- Maniku in 2000

Vice President of the Maldives
- In office 16 July 1975 – 14 January 1977 Serving with: Abdul Sattar Moosa Didi; Ahmed Hilmy Didi; Ibrahim Shihab; Hassan Zareer
- President: Ibrahim Nasir

Personal details
- Born: 1935 Fura Malé, Maldive Islands
- Died: 19 December 2015 (aged 79–80) Mount Elizabeth Hospital, Singapore
- Nickname: Koli Ali Maniku

Ali Umar Maniku, NIIV (Dhivehi: ޢަލީ ޢުމަރުމަނިކު; c. 1935–19 December 2015), popularly known as Koli Ali Maniku was a Maldivian civil servant, cabinet minister and Vice President of the Maldives.

== Early life ==
Maniku was sent to Colombo with the assistance of prime minister Mohamed Amin Didi when he was nine years old for a treatment. He later stayed in Colombo and was educated at Sosun Villa. During his time studying, he shared dorms with Ibrahim Nasir.

== Career ==
He started working in public service in 1958. He also worked as trade ambassador. He worked on the development of Hulhulé Airport and the promotion of tourism in the Maldives. He also headed Maldives Shipping Limited.

Maniku was appointed as one of the Vice Presidents in the administration of former President Ibrahim Nasir appointed by Nasir after the arrest of former prime minister Ahmed Zaki and following a constitutional revision. He was one of the Vice Presidents from October 1975 to May 1977. He also held other cabinet positions such as Minister of Tourism and Trade in 1970s.

During the presidency of Maumoon Abdul Gayoom, Maniku served as special advisor to the president for 26 years. He was minister of shipping in Maumoon's cabinet in the end of 1970s.

In 1979, Maniku received the Public Service Award for his contributions to the Maldivian economy.

In 1982, Maniku received the Public Service Award for his contributions to the Maldivian community.

Maniku received Order of the Distinguished Rule of Izzuddin in 2008.

Maniku wrote a narration of his 50 years of experience in both Dhivehi and English.

== Death ==
At 21:30 hours, Ali Umar Maniku died at Mount Elizabeth Hospital in Singapore on 19 December 2015. President Abdulla Yameen Abdul Gayoom declared a three day state of mourning upon Maniku's death and the National flag was flown half-mast. Home Minister Umar Naseer was appointed as the special representative of the President. The funeral was held in Singapore. The prayer in absentia was held at Masjid-ul Sultan Mohamed Thakurufaanu-al Auzam after I'sha prayer.
