= Moosa Zameer =

Maldivian politician

- މޫސާ ޒަމީރު
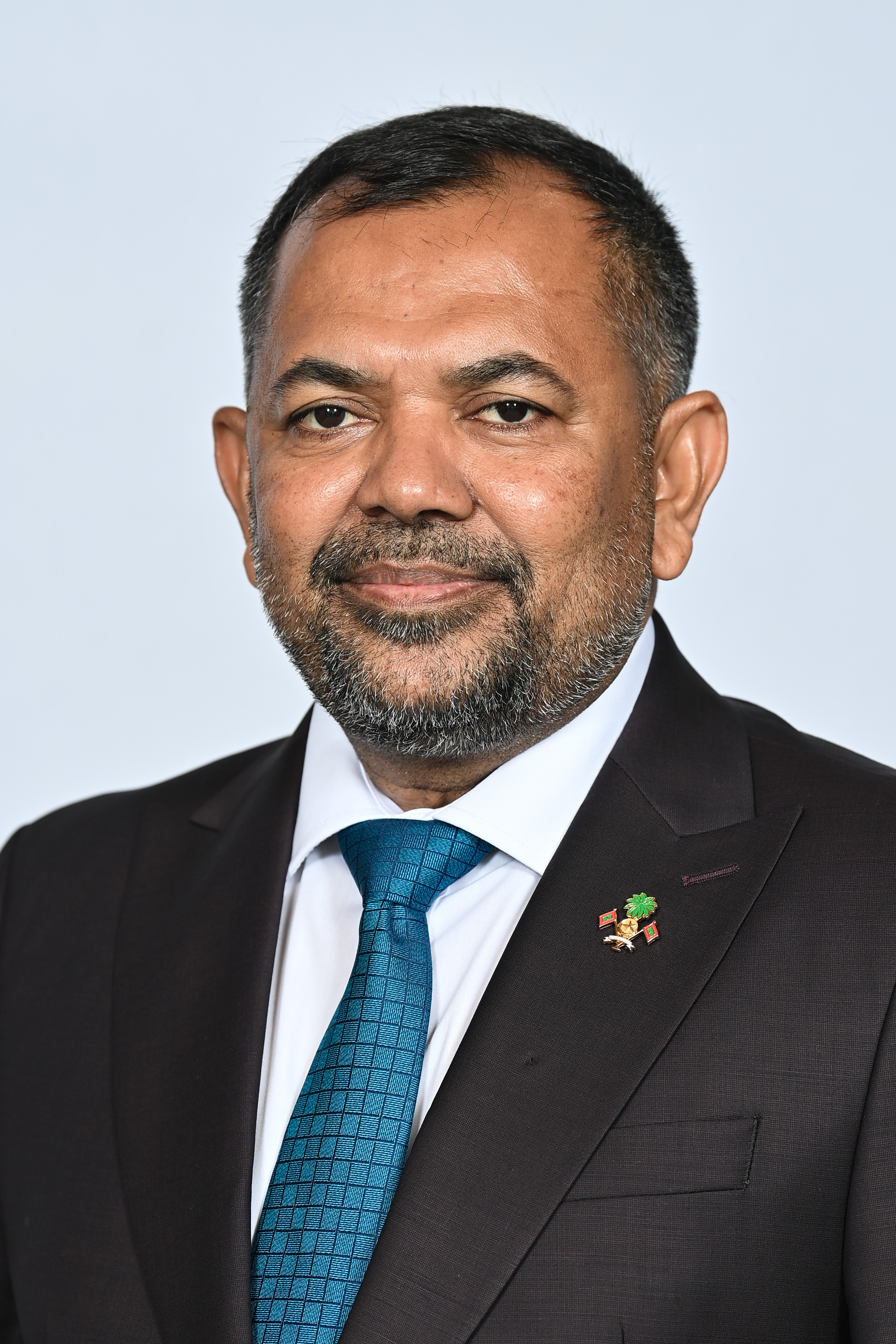
- Official portrait, 2023

Minister of Finance and Enterprises
- In office 14 April 2026 – 8 June 2026
- President: Mohamed Muizzu
- Preceded by: Himself
- Succeeded by: Hassan Zareer

Minister of Finance and Planning
- In office 30 September 2024 – 14 April 2026
- President: Mohamed Muizzu
- Preceded by: Mohamed Shafeeq
- Succeeded by: Himself

Minister of Foreign Affairs
- In office 17 November 2023 – 30 September 2024
- President: Mohamed Muizzu
- Preceded by: Abdulla Shahid
- Succeeded by: Abdulla Khaleel

Minister of Tourism
- In office 28 October 2015 – 11 November 2018
- President: Abdulla Yameen
- Preceded by: Ahmed Adeeb
- Succeeded by: Ali Waheed

Personal details
- Born: Burunee, Thaa Atoll, Maldives
- Party: People's National Congress
- Other political affiliations: Progressive Party of Maldives; People's Alliance (2008–2011)

Moosa Zameer (Dhivehi: މޫސާ ޒަމީރު) is a Maldivian politician who is served as the Minister of Finance and Public Enterprises of the Maldives in 2026. He previously served as the Minister of Foreign Affairs from 2023 to 2024. Earlier, He served as Minister of Tourism from 28 October 2015 to 11 November 2018. He served as the chairman of the Social Council of Maldves for the same duration. Zameer was also a member of the 17th Majlis from 2009 to 2014.

== Early life and education ==
Zameer was born at Burunee in Thaa Atoll, Maldives. He graduated from the University of Sunderland with a Bachelor of Business Management and Cardiff Metropolitan University with a Master of Business Administration.

== Career ==
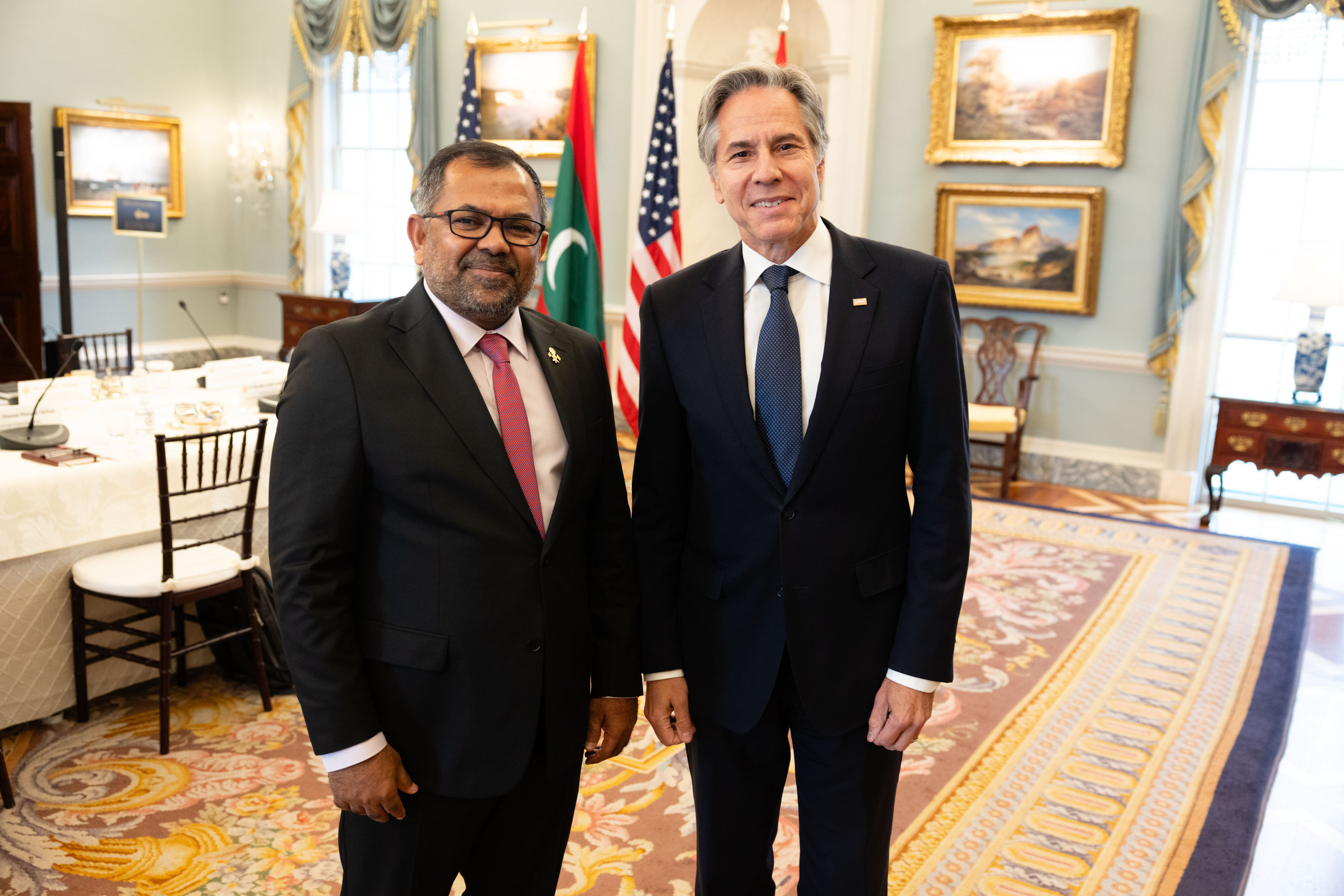
Zameer with United States Secretary of State Antony Blinken in June 2024

Zameer was one of the founders of the now defunct People's Alliance (PA) in 2008, which he served as Vice President and represented in events, etc. He joined the Progressive Party of Maldives (PPM) in 2011 which he served as Vice President for and was instrumental in the party's operations. He was an MP of Kinbidhoo in the 17th People's Majlis from 2009 - 2014. He was a member of various committees and was the Minister of Tourism during the tenure of President Yameen from 28 October 2015 - 17 November 2018.

In November 2023, President Mohamed Muizzu appointed Zameer as the Minister of Foreign Affairs. In September 2024, President Muizzu shuffled the cabinet and subsequently appointed Zameer as the Minister of Finance and Planning. In April 2026, President Muizzu reappointed Zameer as the Minister of Finance and Enterprises. In June 2026, Zameer resigned citing health reasons.
