= Umar Zahir (politician) =

Maldivian politician (1936–2021)

Umar Zahir NIIV
- އުމަރު ޒާހިރު
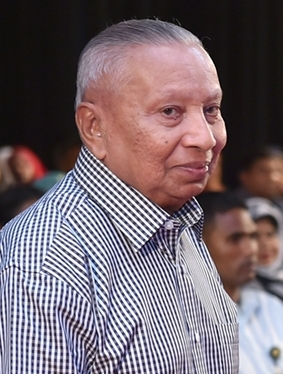
- Zahir in 2016

Senior Minister
- In office 2005–2008
- President: Maumoon Abdul Gayoom

Minister of Public Works
- In office 1993–2004
- President: Maumoon Abdul Gayoom

Minister of Sports
- In office 1988–1993
- President: Maumoon Abdul Gayoom

Personal details
- Born: 26 October 1936 Malé, Sultanate of the Maldive Islands
- Died: 20 December 2021 (aged 85) Galolhu Cemetery, Malé, Maldives
- Occupation: Politician and statesman

Umar Zahir, NIIV (Dhivehi: އުމަރު ޒާހިރު; 26 October 1936 – 20 December 2021) was a Maldivian politician. He was the first sports minister of the Maldives, serving from 1988 to 1993. As public works minister from 1993 to 2004, he oversaw the first construction phase of Hulhumalé, as well as the construction of Thilafushi and the Malé seawall.

== Biography ==
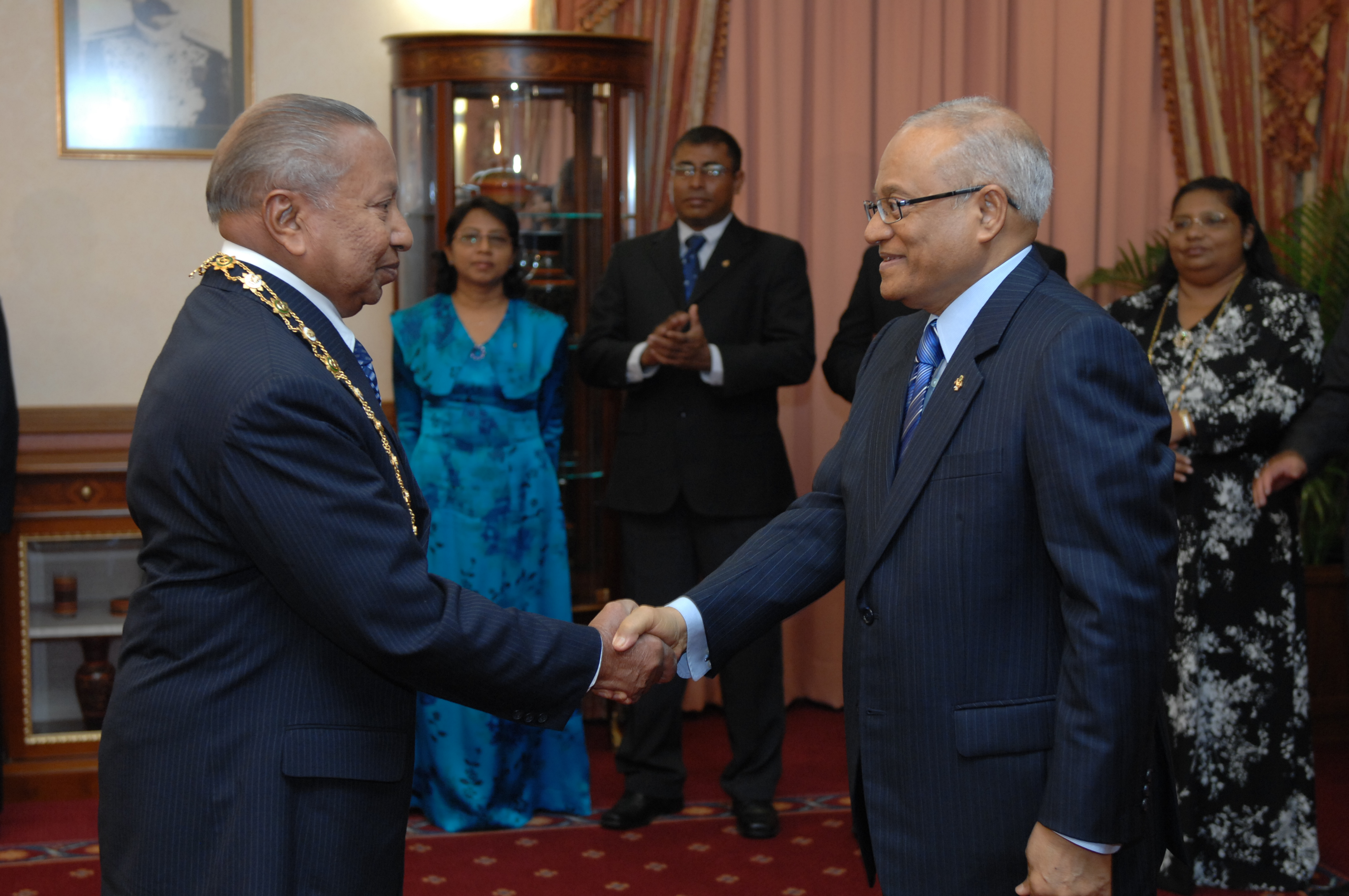
Zahir receiving the Order of Distinguished Rule of Izzuddin from President Gayoom

Zahir was born on 26 October 1936. He was married to Moomina Ibrahim, and they had one daughter. Moomina died in 2018 at the age of 84.

=== Early career ===
Around 1950, Zahir began working at the government liaison office for Gan. He later worked in a number of jobs: headmaster of Majeediyya School, owner of Radio Maldives, and manager of Bandos Resort.

=== Government service ===
Prior to 1970, Zahir returned to the government service as Deputy Minister in the Ministry of Education, then in Home Affairs.

Zahir served as the President of Malé Municipality from 1980 to 1993, introducing projects to improve the city and its roads. In 1983, he was appointed Minister of Home Affairs and Social Services. In 1988, Social Services was moved out of the ministry's purview, and Zahir was appointed Minister of Home Affairs and Sports. This was the first sports ministry for the Maldives.

Zahir served as Minister of Construction and Public Works from 1993 to 2004, with several projects on land reclamation. Under Zahir, the ministry continued the construction of Thilafushi which had begun in 1992. While the island served as the main waste management site for the nearby capital of Malé, the absence of processing facilities led to Thilafushi's international notoriety as "trash island". Plans for modern disposal facilities were announced in 2021. The ministry also completed the first construction phase (1997–2002) of Hulhumalé. Dubbed "the island of hope" by foreign press, Hulhumalé would provide more housing for residents of Malé, one of the most densely-populated cities in the world. To better protect Malé from ocean hazards, Zahir's ministry built a seawall (1995–1997) with Japanese foreign aid. His ministry also built harbors in Fuvahmulah (2000–2002) and other islands. After briefly returning as Minister of Home Affairs from 2004 to 2005, he was Senior Minister from 2005 to 2008.

Besides his ministry roles, Zahir was a Member of Parliament in the 1990s.

=== Later life ===
After leaving the government, Zahir continued to support former President Maumoon Abdul Gayoom. When Gayoom was jailed prior to the 2018 presidential election, Zahir supported the united opposition on Gayoom's behalf.

Zahir received the Order of the Distinguished Rule of Izzuddin in 2008. He was a guest of honour at the 2020 opening of Lonuziyaaraiy Park in Malé.

=== Death and remembrance ===
Zahir died in Malé on 20 December 2021, after being hospitalized for COVID-19. President Ibrahim Mohamed Solih and the Maldives Olympic Committee both published their condolences. Zahir received a state funeral on the same day, and was buried in Galolhu Cemetery. The national flag was flown at half-mast from 21 to 23 December.

An office building in Hulhumalé was dedicated to him by the president who noted that he had performed an invaluable service to the Maldivian people as a state dignitary. Currently, the office building houses some ministries.
