= Moomina Haleem =

Maldivian politician (born 1939)

Moomina Haleem NIIV
- މުއުމިނާ ހަލީމް
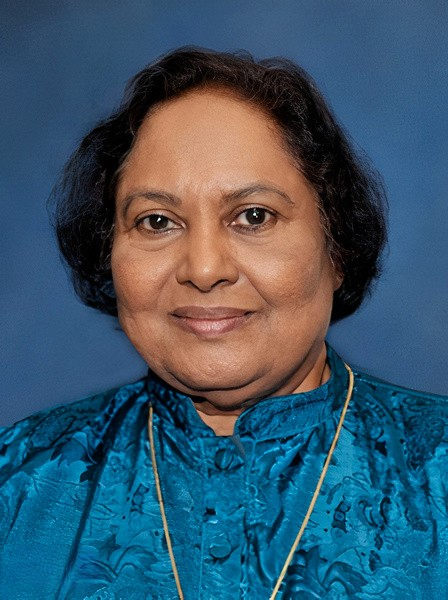
- Haleem in 2013

Minister of Health
- In office 6 January 1977 – 11 November 1978
- President: Ibrahim Nasir

Member of the People's Majlis
- In office 1975–1980
- President: Ibrahim Nasir; Maumoon Abdul Gayoom
- Constituency: Malé

Personal details
- Born: 1939 (age 85–86)

Moomina Haleem NIIV, (Dhivehi: މުއުމިނާ ހަލީމް, born 1939) is a Maldivian former politician. In 1974 she became the first woman to be elected to the People's Majlis. Three years later she also became the first woman appointed as a cabinet minister.

== Biography ==
Haleem trained to be a nurse, including a one-year fellowship at the Australian College of Nursing in Melbourne, becoming the first Maldivian woman to complete higher studies in nursing. She became a matron in the government hospital in Malé in 1963 and a member of the Royal College of Nursing. In 1970 she married Kandi Ahmed Ismail Maniku, a businessman in the tourism trade.

In the 1974 parliamentary elections she was a candidate in Malé and became the first woman elected to the People's Majlis. In January 1977 she was appointed Minister of Health by President Ibrahim Nasir, becoming the first female minister in the country. When the Majlis was due to elect a new president in 1978, it was widely believed that Haleem would have won if the constitution had not prevented women holding the post. She was elected for a second term in parliament in 1979, but turned down the position of Director of Social Affairs under new president Maumoon Abdul Gayoom.

After Gayoom's election, Haleem was regularly detained by the police. She eventually went into exile in 1980; having visited Sri Lanka where her younger sister was receiving medical treatment, she was advised not to return as the government began arresting members of her family. On 1 April she was formally banished for four years on a charge of sedition. Her husband and children remained in the Maldives, and were banished to an outlying island. After the Maldivian government requested she be put under surveillance, she was asked to leave Sri Lanka and moved to London, where she stayed with a friend of her sister.

Haleem was unable to work in the United Kingdom unless she requested political asylum, which she did not want to do, in case it impacted her family in the Maldives. Instead she relocated to Kuwait to work at a hospital. Shortly after her move, the Iran–Iraq War started and she returned to London for five months, before going back to Kuwait. After discovering that the Maldivian government's only aim was to stop her returning home, she was able to move to Colombo in Sri Lanka, where she was joined by her children and mother.

She eventually returned to the Maldives in 2008 after newly elected president Mohamed Nasheed (who succeeded Gayoom) called her and told her she could come home.
