= Farahanaz Faizal =

Maldivian diplomat

- ފަރަޙްނާޒް ފައިޞަލް
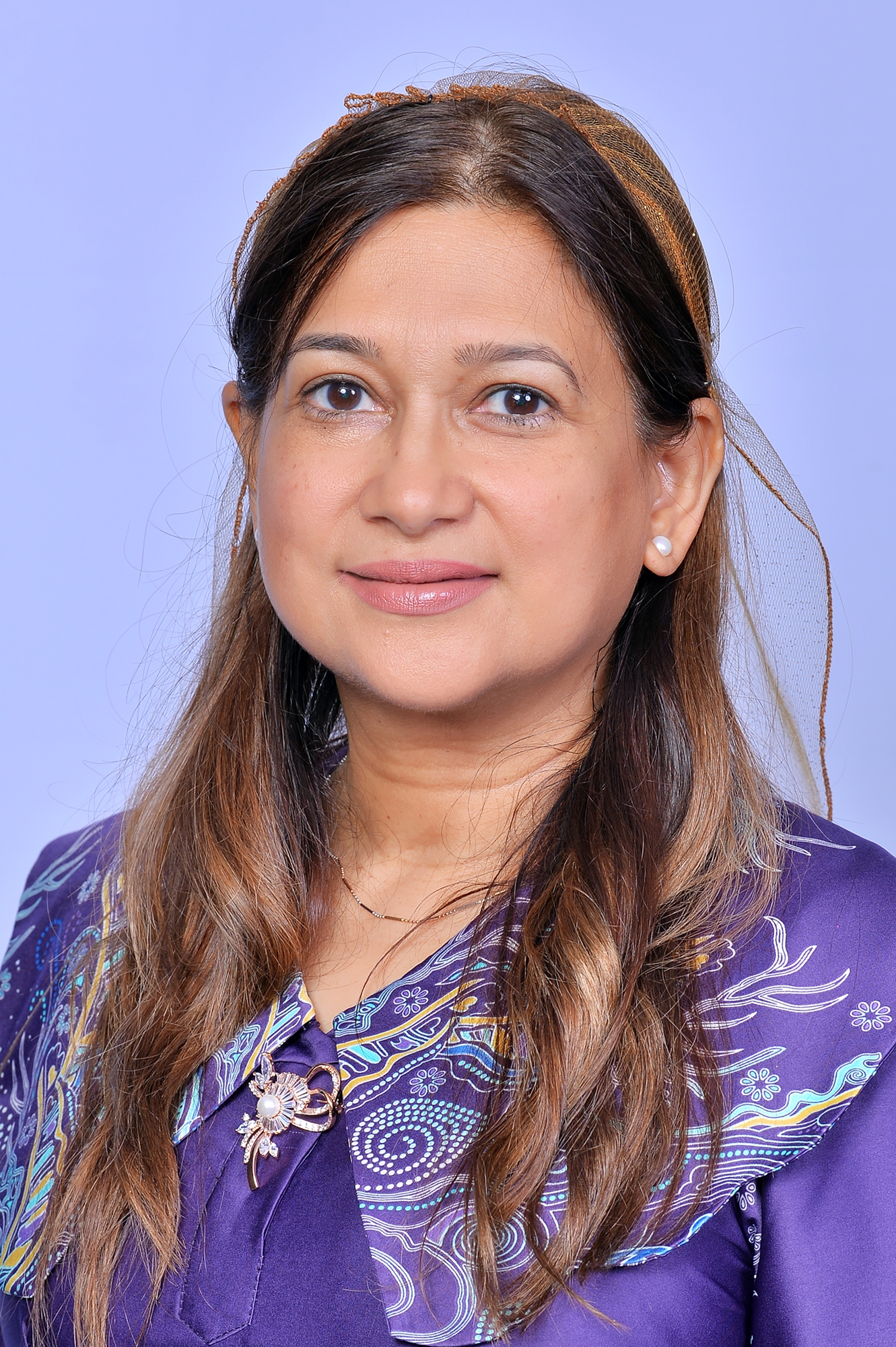

High Commissioner of the Maldives to the United Kingdom
- In office 30 October 2019 – 7 May 2024
- President: Ibrahim Mohamed Solih
- Succeeded by: Iruthisham Adam
- In office 13 December 2008 – 7 February 2012
- President: Mohamed Nasheed
- Preceded by: Mohamed Asim
- Succeeded by: Ahmed Shiaan

Personal details
- Born: Henveiru, Malé, Maldives
- Relations: See Family of Mohamed Amin Didi
- Education: Keele University; University of Cambridge; Hull University

Farahanaz Faizal (Dhivehi: ފަރަޙްނާޒް ފައިޞަލް; born 20 November 19??) is a retired Maldivian diplomat who served as the Maldivian High Commissioner to the United Kingdom. She served from 2009 until 2012 under President Mohamed Nasheed and was reappointed on April 18, 2019 by President Ibrahim Mohamed Solih. She served from 2019 until 2024. Faizal was also the non-resident ambassador of France, Ireland and Spain.

== Career ==
She was the Ambassador of the Maldives to the United Kingdom twice during the Nasheed administration and the Solih administration. In February 2012, she resigned in protest in the aftermath of the coup that overthrew the government of President Nasheed.

Dr. Faizal also served as the non-resident Ambassador of the Maldives to Denmark, Finland, France, Norway, Spain and Sweden during her first tenure as High Commissioner to the United Kingdom, and to Ireland, France and Spain during her second tenure.

== Early life and education ==
Born in Henveiru, in Malé, Maldives, Faizal was born to Abdul Majeed Mahir and Ameena Mohamed Amin.

Faizal obtained her undergraduate degree in international relations from Keele University in 1989 followed by a M.Phil. in the same subject from the University of Cambridge in 1992. Her doctorate is in politics, which she received from the University of Hull in 1996. She is also the first woman from the Maldives to obtain a PhD.

== Honors and awards ==
In 2022, Diplomat magazine named her Diplomat of the Year from Asia and Oceania, making her the first Maldivian to win one of the magazine's awards. In 2024, Dr. Faizal was honoured as one of the 75 Faces of Keele, an initiative marking Keele University's 75th anniversary that recognised 75 individuals whose achievements and contributions have had a lasting impact on the University and the wider world.
