= Mohamed Zahir Hussain =

Chancellor of the Islamic University of Maldives from 2019 to 2026

Mohamed Zahir Hussain NIIV
- މުޙައްމަދު ޒާހިރު ޙުސައިން
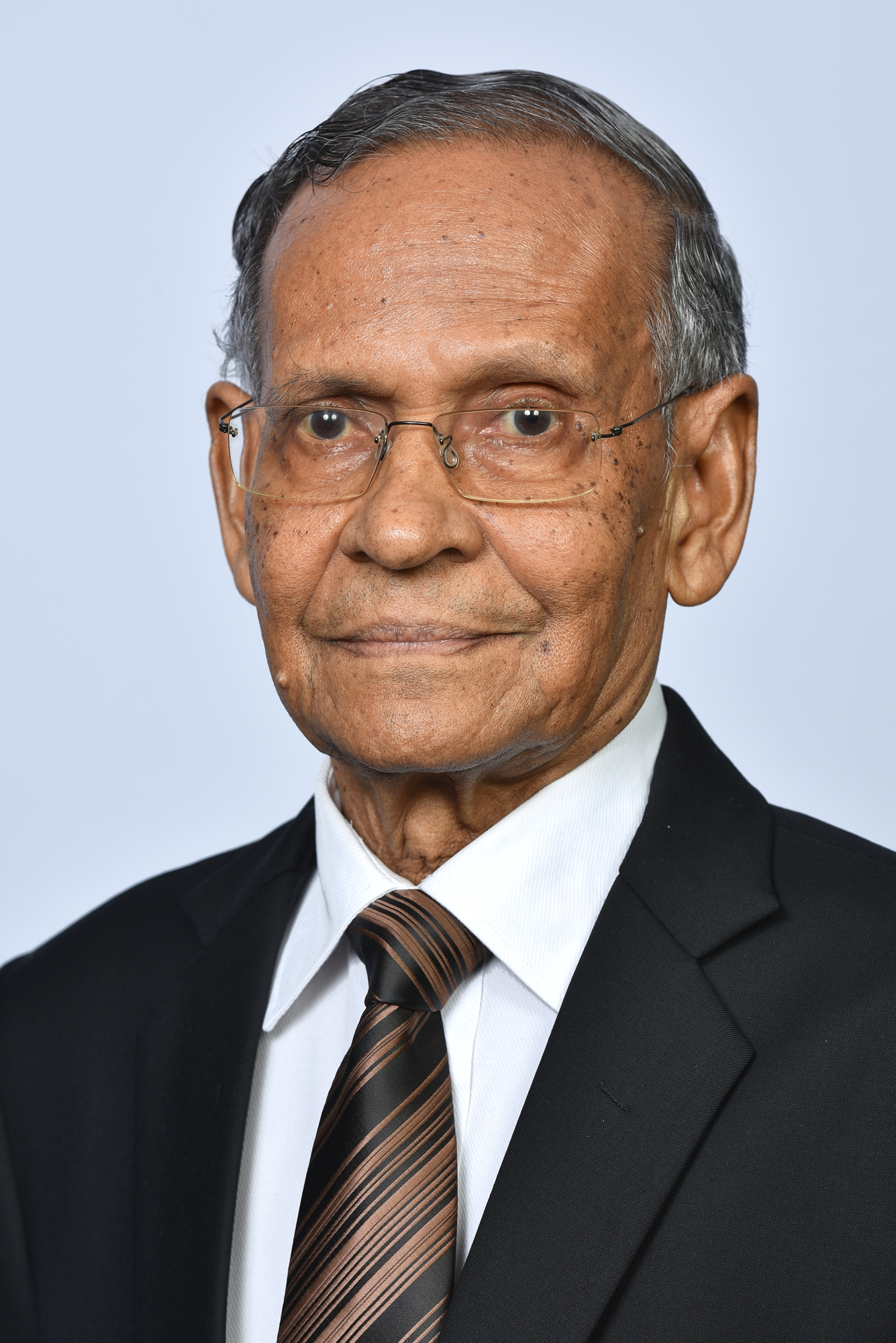
- Official portrait, 2019

Chancellor of the Islamic University of Maldives
- In office 20 August 2019 – 1 February 2026
- President: Ibrahim Mohamed Solih; Mohamed Muizzu

Chancellor of the Maldives National University
- In office 20 March 2012 – 20 August 2019
- President: Mohamed Waheed Hassan; Abdulla Yameen; Ibrahim Mohamed Solih
- Succeeded by: Hassan Hameed

Minister of Education
- In office 23 July 1979 – 30 May 1990
- President: Maumoon Abdul Gayoom
- Preceded by: Abdul Sattar Moosa Didi
- Succeeded by: Abdulla Hameed

Personal details
- Born: Henveiru, Malé, Maldives
- Spouse: Naalia Ibrahim Kaleyfaan (died)
- Children: 3, including Lubna
- Education: Al-Azhar University; National University of Malaysia (PhD)
- Awards: List

Mohamed Zahir Hussain NIIV (Dhivehi: މުޙައްމަދު ޒާހިރު ޙުސައިން) is a Maldivian politician, journalist, and former teacher who is currently the chancellor of the Islamic University of Maldives.

== Education ==
Hussain studied at Al-Azhar University in 1971. He completed his PhD in the National University of Malaysia.

== Career ==
After coming back to Maldives from studying at Al-Azhar University, Husain became an Islam teacher at Aminiya School. Later, President Ibrahim Nasir appointed Hussain as a lawyer in the Ministry of Education. During the Gayoom administration, he was appointed as the Minister of Education on 23 July 1979. During his time as the Minister of Education, Hussain oversaw the creation of multiple community schools, notables being the Science Education Centre (predecessor to CHSE).

He also oversaw the rise in the literature rate in the country and led the establishment of a modern curriculum in Maldivian schools. He also focused on teacher education which helped finding teachers across the atolls. Hussain oversaw the creation of the Madhrasathul Dhiraasathul Islamiyya, now the Islamic University of Maldives.

He served other ministerial positions in the government such as Minister of Education, Minister of Youth and Sports and Minister at the President's Office. During his time as Youth and Sports minister, he led efforts to expand and develop sports in the country. He resigned as Youth Minister but was later appointed as a Senior Minister (Special Advisor to the President) in 2006. He was also the chairman of the now-defunct Haveeru Daily.

In 2008, he was awarded the Order of the Distinguished Rule of Izzuddin by President Maumoon Abdul Gayoom.

In 2012, Hussain was appointed by president Mohamed Waheed Hassan as the chancellor of the Maldives National University (MNU).

In 20 August 2019, he was appointed as the chancellor of the Islamic University of Maldives (IUM) by President Ibrahim Mohamed Solih.

In November 2024, he was awarded the Highest Honour of Service to the Education sector by President Mohamed Muizzu for his services in the education sector.

In February 2026, Hussain resigned as the chancellor of the Islamic University of Maldives.

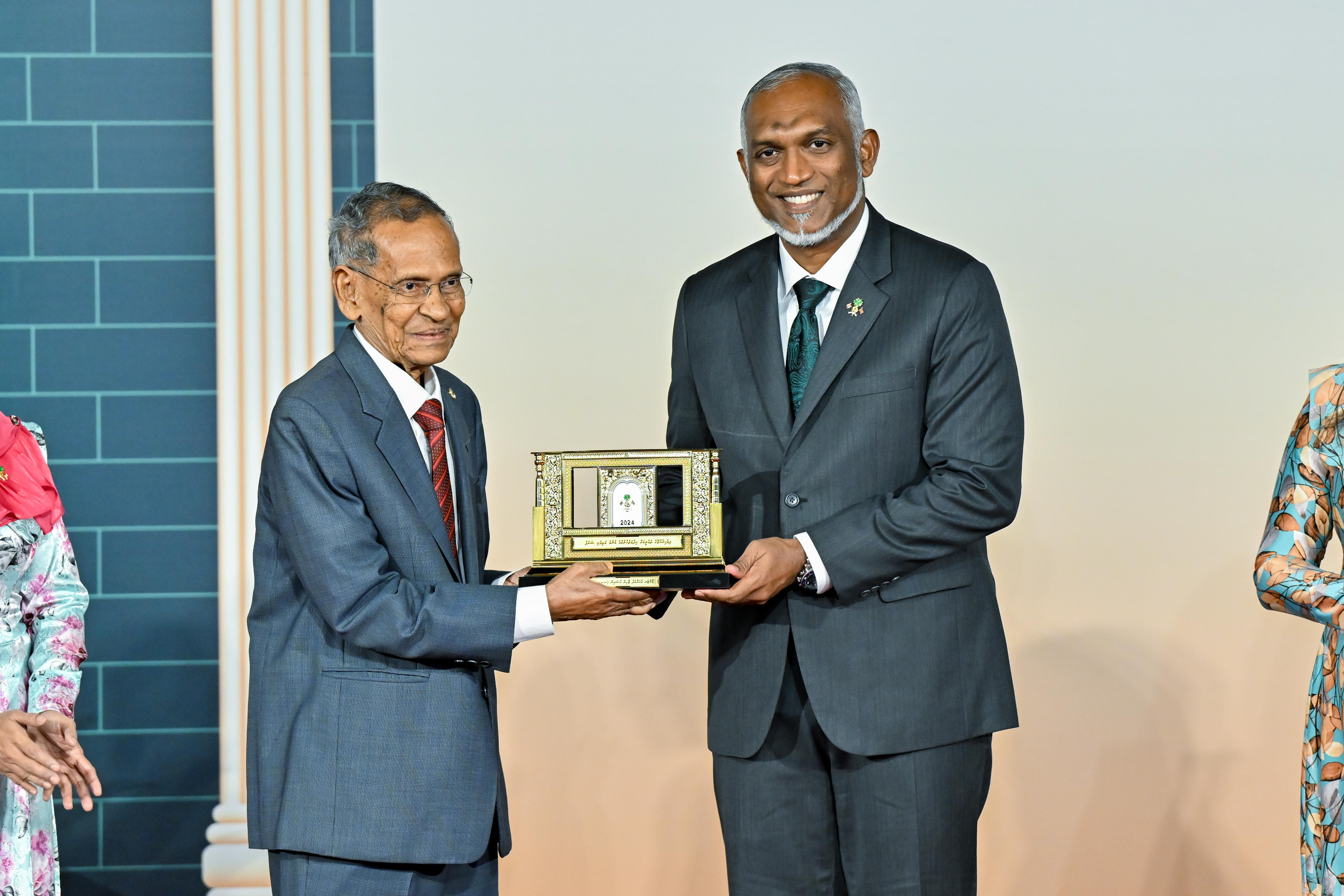
Zahir receiving the honour by Mohamed Muizzu in 2024

== Awards and recognitions ==
Hussain received the Maldivian government's special award for completing his PhD in 2001, National Award of Recognition in 1989, Minivan 25 National Award in 1990, the Alimas Galan journalism award, President's Award for Special Achievement in 2001, Order of Izzuddin in 2008, and the Highest Honour for Service in the Education sector in 2024.

In January 2026, Hussain was awarded with a gold medal for promoting cricket in the Maldives during his tenure as the Sports minister.

Hussain had been hailed as the 'father of journalism in Maldives' through the creation of his newspaper Haveeru Daily. During Haveeru Daily's timespan, it served as the most popular print and news outlet in the country and believed to be the golden age of journalism in the Maldives.

== Family life ==
His wife was Naalia Ibrahim Kaleyfaan, who died in 2021 while receiving treatment in ADK Hospital. He has three children – Leena Zahir Hussain, Vail Zahir Hussain and Lubna Mohamed Zahir Hussain.
