= Ahmed Hilmy Didi =

Vice President of the Maldives from 1975 to 1977

Ahmed Hilmy Didi Faarhaana Kilegefan
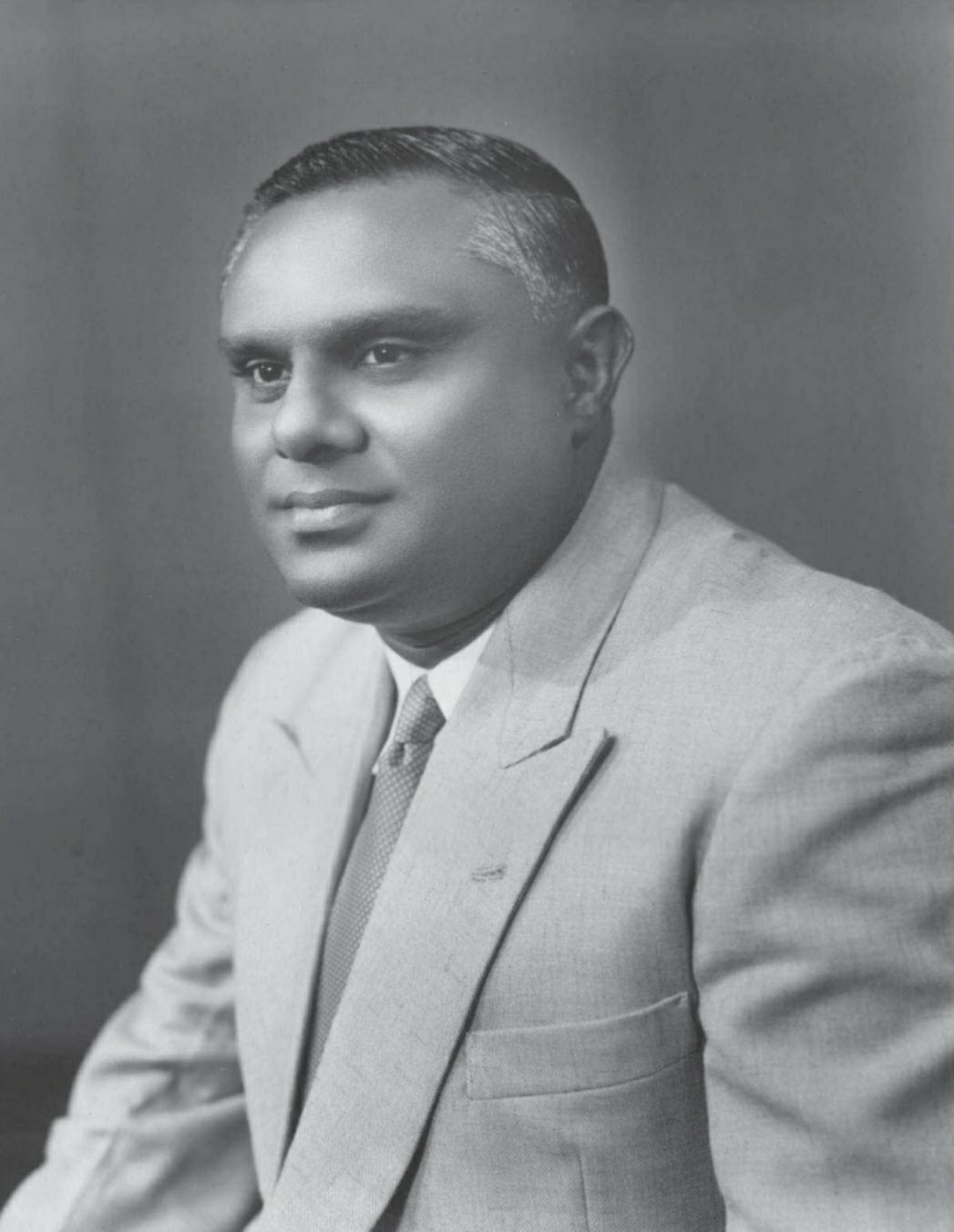
- Portrait, c. 1970s

Vice President of the Maldives
- In office 27 March 1975 – 6 January 1977 Serving with: Abdul Sattar Moosa Didi; Ibrahim Shihab; Ali Maniku; Hassan Zareer
- President: Ibrahim Nasir
- Preceded by: Office created
- Succeeded by: Office abolished
Senior political offices
Minister of Agriculture
In office 13 March 1980 – 13 December 1983
President	Maumoon Abdul Gayoom
Minister of Fisheries
In office 7 January 1977 – 11 November 1978
President	Ibrahim Nasir
In office 28 April 1971 – 27 March 1975
President	Ibrahim Nasir
Prime Minister	Ahmed Zaki
Minister of Health and Communications
In office 20 April 1951 – 31 December 1951
Prime Minister	Mohamed Amin Didi

Personal details
- Born: Ahmed Hilmy; 5 June 1917 Kakaage, Fura Malé, Maldive Islands
- Died: 13 December 1983 (aged 66) Malé, Maldives
- Resting place: Malé Friday Mosque
- Party: Muthagaddim (1950–1954)
- Spouse: Mariyam Amin
- Relations: Mohamed Amin Didi (brother in law)
- Parent: Ismail Didi (father)
- Education: Zahira College

Ahmed Hilmy Didi, FRK (5 June 1917 – 13 December 1983) was a Maldivian politician and diplomat who served as vice president of the Maldives from March 1975 to January 1977, during the administration of president Ibrahim Nasir. He twice served as Minister of Fisheries, first from 1971 to 1975 and again from 1977 to 1978. Hilmy served as Minister of Agriculture from 1980 until his death in 1983.

Born in old Fura Malé, Hilmy was born into Kakaage family, one of the ruling families in the Maldives at the time. He went to Zahira College, Colombo. He was the son of Ismail Didi. He was also the ambassador of the Maldives to Sri Lanka twice, president of the Colombo Plan in 1971, and the first Permanent Representative of the Maldives to the United Nations from July 1965 to 1966. In 1975, was appointed vice president by then–president Ibrahim Nasir, to serve as the third vice president during his term, as Nasir had five vice presidents serving together. Along with Hilmy, Abdul Sattar Moosa Didi and Ibrahim Shihab served, they both being appointed earlier.

During Hilmy's leaderships as ministers and vice presidency, Maldives faced extraordinary revolutionary deployments in fishing and economic industries. His tenure as minister of fisheries, Maldives established a modern fishing industry, resulting the economy grow. As a result of his efforts in Japan in 1972, the traditional dhonis in the Maldives were converted to engine—powered boats. In 1965, following the Maldives' attainment of independence from British protectorate, he played a pivotal role in the diplomatic efforts to secure the nation's membership in the United Nations.

== Early life and family ==
=== Early life and education ===
Ahmed Hilmy Didi was born on 5 June 1917 in Kakaage at around 7:15PM MVT. He was born to Ismail Dhoshimeyna Kilegefan (Kakaage Ismail Didi), son of Ali Ranna Bandey'ri Kilegefan and Serikkal Don Manika, daughter of Thudathifaanuge Landran Awgoathi Muhammad Bodu Thakurufaanu, of Minicoy.

At the beginning of the twenty-first century, following Hilmy's birth, the death of then–prime minister Athireege Ibrahim Dhoshimeyna Kilegefan led to the resurgence of the historic conflict between the Athireege and Kakaage clans. This renewed enmity was a consequence of King Muhammad Shamsuddeen III's decision not to transfer the prime ministerial power to the Kakaage family, instead appointing Athireege Abdul Majeed Didi. Raised amid this ongoing conflict, Hilmy was forced to enter the country's politics at a young age.

Hilmy Didi was educated at Zahira College, in Colombo, Ceylon, where he became fluent in both English and Sinhala language. He devoted much of his time to planting trees and engaging in sports. A talented drummer, he played a key role in reviving cultural customs. From a young age, he was an influential figure who worked to maintain unity among the people of Henver. Additionally, he was actively involved in managing the family business.

=== Personal life ===
Ahmed Hilmy Didi married Mariyam Amin in the 1930s. Mariyam Amin, granddaughter of prime minister Ibrahim Dhoshimeyna Kilegefan and sister of president Mohamed Amin Didi, was a member of the Athireege family, which was politically opposed to the Kakaage family to which Hilmy belonged. The couple had one child, Ismail Hilmy Didi.

== Vice presidency (1975–1977) ==
Hilmy was appointed vice president of the Maldives by President Ibrahim Nasir and was sworn into office on 27 March 1975 in Malé, Maldives. He served as vice president along with Abdul Sattar Moosa Didi, Ibrahim Shihab, Ali Umar Maniku and Hassan Zareer.

As vice president of the Maldives, Ahmed Hilmy Didi played a crucial role in the nation's international relations, particularly in the realm of maritime boundaries. On 28 December 1976, during his tenure, the Maldives and India signed a significant maritime boundary treaty. This agreement was instrumental in defining the maritime borders between the two countries, providing clarity and stability for both nations in their respective maritime zones. The treaty explicitly placed Minicoy, a strategically important island, on the Indian side of the boundary.

Hilmy Didi's involvement in the treaty negotiation and signing reflected his diplomatic acumen and the Maldives' broader strategic interests. By endorsing the treaty, he contributed to the formalization of the maritime boundary, which has had lasting implications for the region's geopolitical landscape. His role in this process highlighted his influence in shaping the Maldives' foreign policy during a pivotal period in its history.

== Ministries ==
=== Minister of Fisheries ===
During Ahmed Hilmy Didi's tenures as Minister of Fisheries, the Maldives experienced significant advancements in its fishing industry. Under his leadership, the country embarked on revolutionary changes that modernised its fishing practices and boosted the economy. One of his notable achievements was the establishment of a modern fishing industry, which included the introduction of engine–powered boats. This transformation was a direct result of his efforts in Japan in 1972, where he facilitated the conversion of traditional sail-powered dhonis into more efficient engine-powered boats. This upgrade not only improved fishing efficiency but also contributed substantially to the growth of the Maldivian economy.

Hilmy's vision and reforms as Minister of Fisheries had a lasting impact on the country's economic landscape. By modernising the fishing industry, he laid the groundwork for sustainable growth and development in one of the Maldives' most crucial sectors.
