= Ahmed Shiaan =

Maldivian diplomat

- އަހްމަދު ޝިޢަން
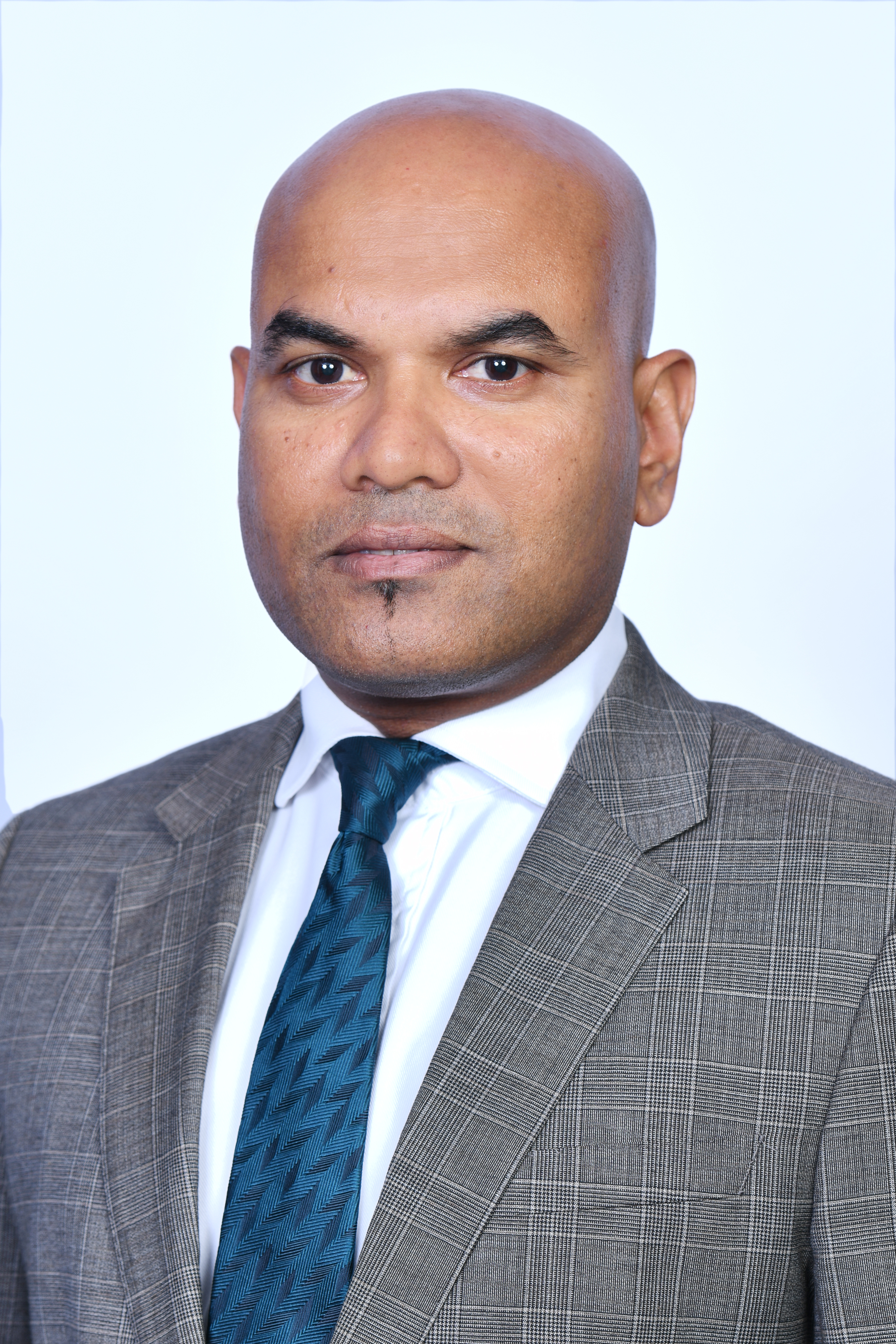

Ambassador of the Maldives to the United Kingdom
- In office 31 October 2015 – 16 November 2018
- President: Mohamed Muizzu
- Preceded by: Farahanaz Faisal
- Succeeded by: Iruthisham Adam

Ambassador of the Maldives to Belgium and the European Union
- In office 26 October 2014 – 5 March 2019
- Succeeded by: Hassan Sobir

Ahmed Shiaan (Dhivehi: އަހްމަދު ޝިއާން) is a Maldivian diplomat who served as the State Secretary, Chief of Protocol and current State Minister of Ministry of Foreign Affairs of Maldives. He was appointed when the Solih administration took office on 26 March 2018. Shiaan served as the Maldives Ambassador the European Union (EU), Netherlands, United Kingdom (UK), Belgium, and Luxembourg before his appointment to the Ministry of Foreign Affairs. Ahmed Shiaan is a fluent speaker of both Dhivehi and English. He understands Hindi and partly understands German.

== Career ==
He joined the Ministry of Foreign Affairs in 1996 and held a variety of positions ranging from Head of Division to Head of Department to the Director of the Foreign Service Institute of Maldives. He has also represented Maldives in more than 50 countries. He later became the Ambassador to Belgium and the EU on 26 October 2016 during the Yameen administration. He was also the Ambassador to the UK on 31 October 2015 but was recalled back.

== Education ==
Shiaan obtained a bachelor's degree in Political science and Economics from the Bangalore University, as well as a master's degree in International relations from the Heidelberg University. He has also had Specialist Training in Security Studies and he has also had completed numerous training courses in diplomacy, international negotiation, security studies and environmental diplomacy in Europe and Asia.

Preceded by Himself as High Commissioner	Ambassador of Maldives to the United Kingdom; 2016–2018	Succeeded by Farahanaz Faisal
Preceded by Farahanaz Faisal	High Commissioner of Maldives to the United Kingdom; 2015–2016	Succeeded by Himself as Ambassador
