= Lubna Mohamed Zahir Hussain =

Maldivian politician

- ލުބްނާ މުޙައްމަދު ޒާހިރު ޙުސައިން
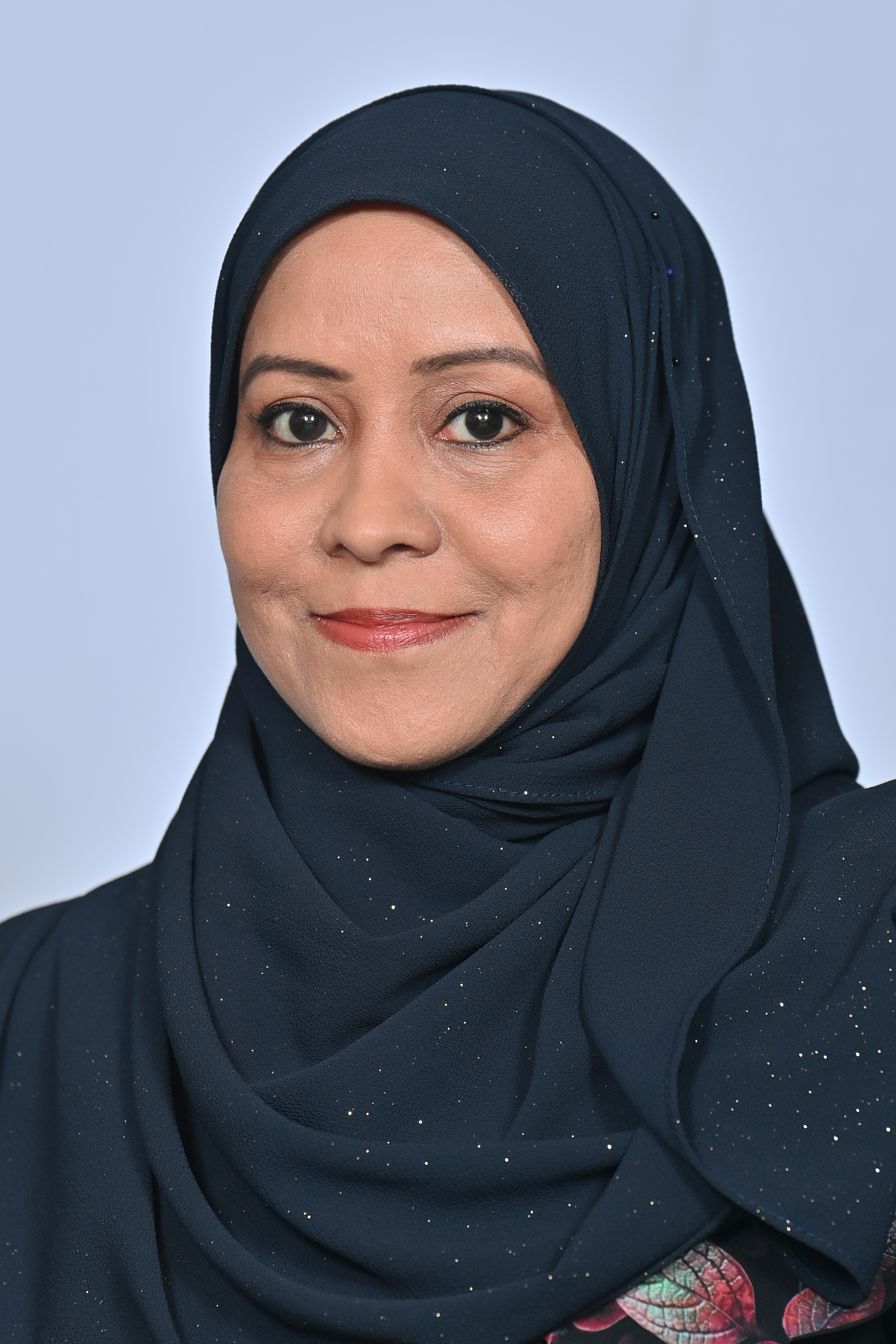
- Official portrait, 2023.

Minister of State for Homeland Security and Technology
- Incumbent
- Assumed office 22 November 2023
- President: Mohamed Muizzu

Personal details
- Born: Henveiru, Malé, Maldives
- Party: Peoples National Congress, PNC
- Parent: Mohamed Zahir Hussain and Naila Ibrahim Kaleyfaan

Lubna Mohamed Zahir Hussain (Dhivehi: ލުބްނާ މުޙައްމަދު ޒާހިރު ޙުސައިން), commonly known as Lubna Zahir Hussain is a Maldivian politician who is currently serving as the Minister of State for Homeland Security and Technology since 2023.

== Career ==
Lubna Mohamed Zahir Hussain was elected to the Maldives Constitutional Assembly in 2004. She represented Shaviyani Atoll in the Constitiutional until 2008 and also served as a member of the 11 Member Drafting Committee of the Constitution of the Republic of Malddives. Hussain was first appointed as the Deputy Minister of Health and Family before being appointed in October 2010 as the Minister of State for Health and Family. She also served as the first chairman of the National Drug Agency's board. While Hussain was the chairman of the NDA, 101 offenders completed the Drug Court's rehabilitation programme. She was also a member of the Steering Committee of the “Second Chance Programme”.

In 2023, Hussain joined the Peoples national Congress. She was also appointed as the Minister of State for Homeland Security and Technology in November 2023. In 2024, she was appointed as the chairperson of the NDA. Lubna Mohamed Zahir Hussain cuurently serves as the Minister of State for Foreign Affairs

== Personal life ==
Hussain is the daughter of Mohamed Zahir Hussain, the former minister of education.
