= Order of Izzuddin =

Second-highest national award in the Maldives

Order of the Distinguished Rule of Izzuddin

Awarded by Maldives
- Type: Order
- Status: Currently constituted
- Grades: Collar
- Post-nominals: NIIV

Statistics
- First induction: 15 August 1952
- Total inductees: 43

Precedence
- Next (higher): Order of Ghazi
- Ribbon bar

The Order of the Distinguished Rule of Izzuddin (Dhivehi: ނިޝާން އިއްޒުއްދީނުގެ އިއްޒަތުގެ ވެރިކަން, romanized: Nishan Izzuddinge Izzathuge Verikan), or more informally the Order of Nishan Izzuddin, is the highest Maldivian honour which may be conferred upon a foreign national. The Order of the Distinguished Rule of Izzuddin is dedicated to Sultan al-Ghazi Hassan Izzuddin Sri Kula Ranmiba Kahthiri Bawana Maharadun.

== Insignia ==
- The collar is made of gold with alternating eight-pointed gold stars with green centres, each with a gold upward-pointing crescent encircling a gold five-pointed star, and eight-pointed gold stars with white crescents.
- The badge is an eight-pointed gold star with a green centre, in the middle of which is a white upward-curving crescent encircling two crossed national flags in gold.
- The sash is worn passing from the right shoulder to the left hip, the badge being pinned on the sash at the left hip. The sash is red with a narrow centre stripe of dark green with white edges. A smaller version of the badge is worn on the collar.

== Recipients ==
Forty fice recipients have been awarded the honour, which includes:

Recipient	Date	Ref.
Mohamed Amin Didi	15 August 1952	
Prince Philip, Duke of Edinburgh	15 March 1972	
Lord Mountbatten	15 March 1972	
Chun Doo-hwan	30 October 1984	
Shridath Ramphal	16 November 1989	
Fathulla Jameel	10 November 2008	
Mohamed Zahir Hussain	10 November 2008	
Abdulla Hameed	10 November 2008	
Ali Umar Maniku	10 November 2008	
Abdulla Jameel	10 November 2008	
Umar Zahir	10 November 2008	
Ilyas Ibrahim	10 November 2008	
Ismail Shafeeu	10 November 2008	
Ahmed Zahir	10 November 2008	
Abdulla Kamaaludheen	10 November 2008	
Mohamed Rasheed Ibrahim	10 November 2008	
Al Waleed bin Talal Al Saud	2 December 2009	
Ibrahim Hussain Zaki	26 July 2011	
Ibrahim Rasheed	26 July 2011	
Abdul Sattar Moosa Didi	26 July 2011	
Moomina Haleem	26 July 2011	
Mohamed Zahir	26 July 2011	
Naseema Mohamed	26 July 2011	
Mohamed Nooraddin	26 July 2011	
Mohamed Zahir Naseer	26 July 2011	
Mahmoud Abbas	5 June 2013	
Abbas Ibrahim	26 July 2013	
Abdul Rasheed Hussain	26 July 2013	
Aneesa Ahmed	26 July 2013	
Ismail Fathee	26 July 2013	
Abdul Samad Abdulla	9 November 2013	
Abdul Sattar Adam	23 April 2017	
Ahmed Adam	28 October 2019	
Abdulla Sodiq	28 October 2019	
Narendra Modi	8 June 2019	
Abdulla Shahid	6 October 2021	
Ahmed Muthasim Adnan	27 July 2025	
Qasim Ibrahim	27 July 2025	
Hassan Sobir	27 July 2025	
Mohamed Latheef	26 July 2026	
Ibrahim Rasheed Moosa	26 July 2026	
Hussain Afeef	26 July 2026	
Mohamed Moosa	26 July 2026	
