= Abdulla Sodiq =

Maldivian writer (born 1935)

Abdulla Sodiq NIIV
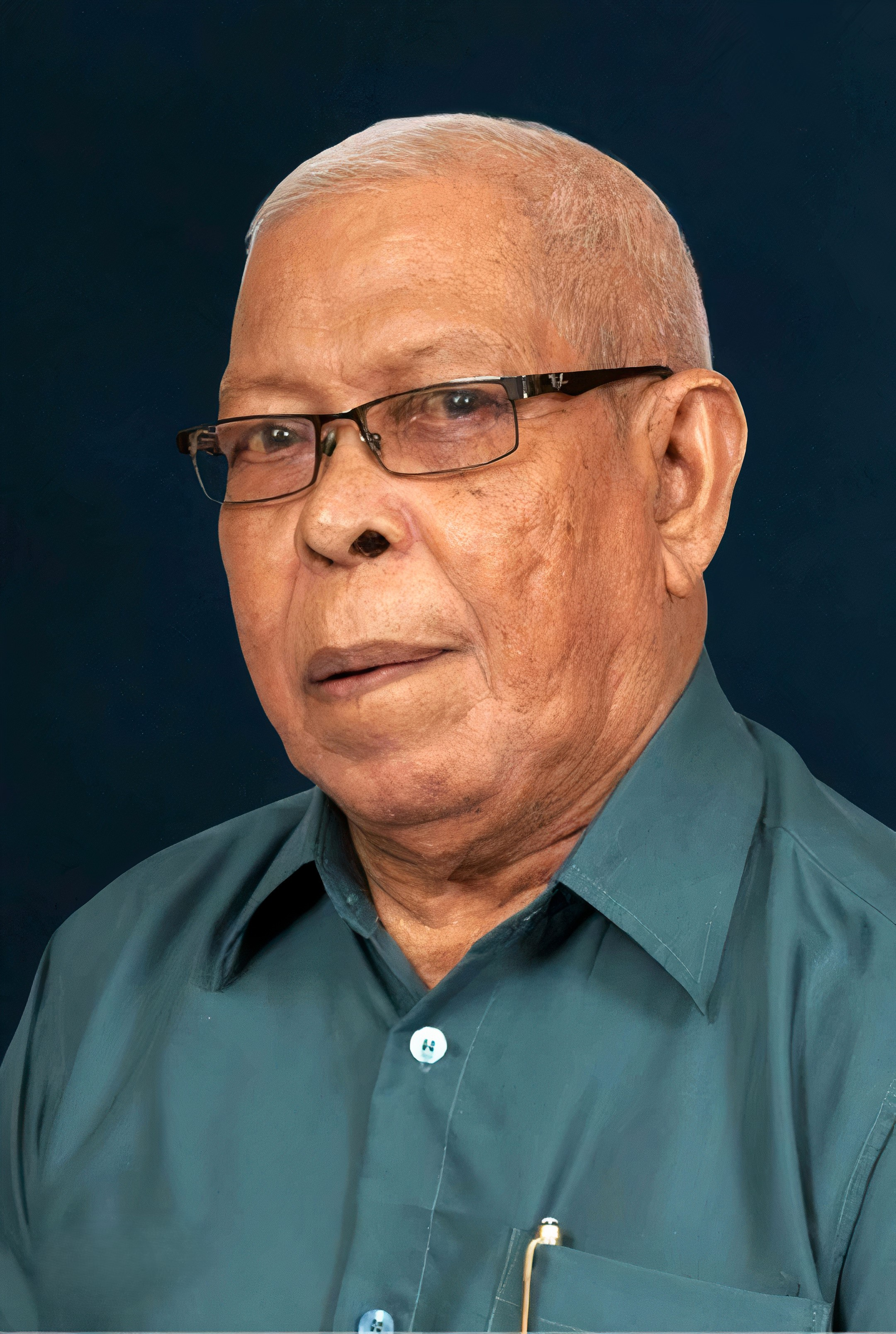
- Portrait, 2019
- Born: 11 January 1935 (age 91); Muli, Meemu Atoll, Maldives
- Education: Madhrasathul Saniyya
- Occupation: Litterateur
- Years active: 1952−present
- Title: Nishaan Izzuddin Izzathuge Veriyaa
- Spouse: Mariyam Muneera
- Awards: List

Abdulla Sodiq, NIIV (Dhivehi: އަބްދުﷲ ސޯދިގު; born 11 January 1935) commonly known as Soadhube (Dhivehi: ސޯދުބެ) is a Maldivian litterateur.

== Career ==
In 1944, Sodiq migrated to Malé to pursue his education.

He started his career in the government on 29th May 1952 as a clerk at the printing press. In addition to his contributions in the fields of literature and linguistics, He is also a litterateur; his numerous written works include stories and Urdu to Dhivehi translations.

Sodiq has been in the service of the government for the past 55 years and continues his contributions as a consultant at the Dhivehi Language Academy.

Sodiq served the longest at the then Centre for Linguistic and Historical Research where he has been in service for the past 30 years. He has also published numerous literacy works on the usage guidelines of the Dhivehi language, and is noted for his contributions in the field of historical research, teaching and tutoring.

In 2019, he was appointed as an advisor to the then Ministry of Arts, Culture and Heritage by President Ibrahim Mohamed Solih.

== COVID-19 ==
In May 2021, Sodiq was tested positive to COVID-19 and was hospitalized in Indira Gandhi Memorial Hospital.

== Awards and recognitions ==
Sodiq received the National Award of Recognition in the field of public service in 1980 and 1983, the National Award of Recognition in the field of poetry in 1992, the National Award of Honor in the field of literature in 1998, the Minivan 25 Award in the field of public service, Lifetime Achievement Award in 2018 and the Order of the Distinguished Rule of Izzuddin in 2019.

Decoration		Country	Year
—	National Award	Maldives	1980
—	National Award	Maldives	1983
—	Minivan 25 Award	Maldives	1990
—	National Award	Maldives	1992
—	National Award	Maldives	1998
—	Lifetime Achievement Award	Maldives	2018
	Order of the Distinguished Rule of Izzuddin NIIV	Maldives	2019
