= Ahmed Zahir =

Maldivian politician (born 1945)

Ahmed Zahir NIIV
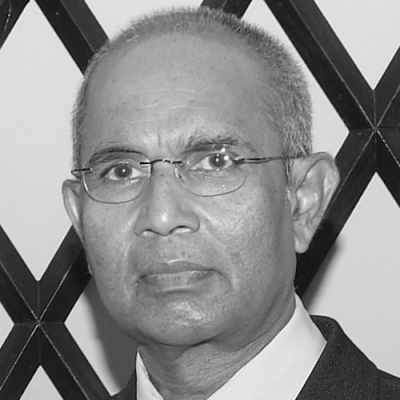
- Zahir in 2004

Speaker of the People's Majlis
- In office 13 September 2004 – 6 August 2008
- President: Maumoon Abdul Gayoom
- Preceded by: Abdulla Hameed
- Succeeded by: Mohamed Shihab

Attorney General
- In office 22 February 1990 – 27 March 1991
- President: Maumoon Abdul Gayoom
- Preceded by: Ahmed Zaki
- Succeeded by: Mohamed Munavvar

Personal details
- Born: 26 September 1945 (age 80)
- Nickname: Seena Zahir

Ahmed Zahir, NIIV, commonly known as Seena Zahir (born 26 September 1945) is a Maldivian politician and lawyer who served as Attorney General from February 1990 to March 1991, and as the Speaker of the People's Majlis from 2004 to 2008.

Zahir also served as the Minister of Justice during the reign of President Maumoon Abdul Gayoom.
