= Mohamed Shihab =

Maldivian politician (born 1957)

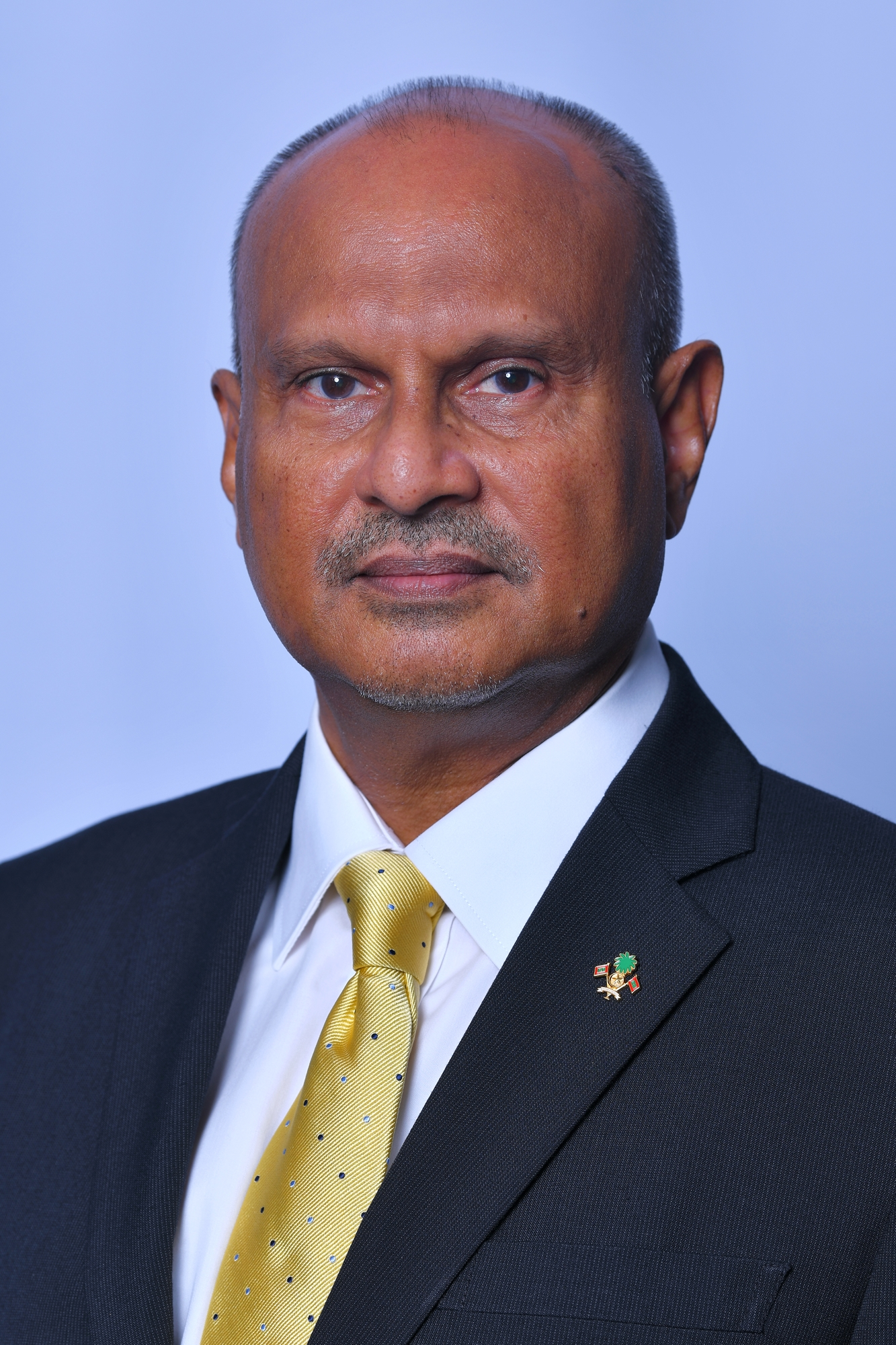
- Shihab in 2019
- Born: 2 October 1957 (age 68); Malé, Maldive Islands
- Occupation: Maldivian politician
- Political party: Jumhooree Party
- Other political affiliations: Maldivian Democratic Party

Mohamed Shihab (born 2 October 1957) is a Maldivian politician. He was the Speaker of the People's Majlis — the parliament of the Maldives and a member of the Jumhooree Party. He is a former senior member of Maldivian Democratic Party. He became the Speaker of Majlis on 12 August 2008, succeeding former Speaker Ahmed Zahir, and he served as the speaker until 28 May 2009.

He was terminated from the post of Managing Director of Maldives Post Limited in March 2006 for signing an MDP press release on 23 February 2006, condemning the government.

He was previously the Minister of Home Affairs from 3 June 2009 to 10 December 2010. After he resigned he was appointed as the Advisor on Political Affairs. He was the Minister of Finance for President Mohamed Nasheed's government from 4 January 2012 to 7 February 2012. In October 2019, he was appointed as Advisor to the President in President Ibrahim Mohamed Solih's government. He resigned from that on 3 July 2023.
