= Dhivehi Language Academy =

National academy for promoting the Dhivehi language in the Maldives

- ދިވެހިބަހުގެ އެކެޑަމީ
- Predecessor: Maldives National Centre for Linguistic and Historic Research
- Formation: 8 August 2011; 15 years ago
- Headquarters: Sosunge, Sosun Magu
- Location: Malé, Maldives
- Official language: Dhivehi
- President: Mr. Hassan Shakir Mohamed
- Vice President: Ms. Zulfa Ibrahim
- Website: dhivehiacademy.edu.mv

Dhivehi Language Academy (Dhivehi: ދިވެހިބަހުގެ އެކެޑަމީ, romanized: Dhivehibahuge Ekedamee), is the national academy for promoting the Dhivehi language in the Maldives, established on 8 August 2011. The main office of the organization is located at Sosunge, in Malé, the capital of the Maldives.

== History ==
Dhivehi Academy was established after the abolition of the Maldives National Centre for Linguistic and Historic Research, which was locally known as Dhivehi Bahaai Thaareekhah Khidhumaiy Kuraa Qaumee Marukaz. The academy was established after the National Language (Priority) Bill was ratified by President Mohamed Nasheed which was passed by the Parliament.
