= List of monarchy referendums =

Monarchy referendums are referendums on the establishment, abolition, or restoration of monarchy or on the rules of succession.

== Referendums on the establishment, abolition, or restoration of a monarchy ==
Country	Referendum	Date	Result	For republic [%]	For monarchy [%]	Turnout [%]	Comments	Notes
Albania	1997 Albanian monarchy referendum	29 June 1997	republic retained	66.7	33.3	71.64	Legitimacy of the results have been called into question by the House of Zogu.	
Australia	1999 Australian republic referendum	6 November 1999	monarchy retained	45.13	54.87	95.1		
Brazil	1993 Brazilian constitutional referendum	21 April 1993	republic retained	86.6	13.4	84.3		
Bulgaria	1946 Bulgarian republic referendum	8 September 1946	monarchy abolished	95.6	4.4	91.7		
France	1804 French constitutional referendum	June 1804	republic abolished	0.1	99.9			
France	1852 French Second Empire referendum	21 and 22 November 1852	monarchy restored	3.1	96.9			
The Gambia	1965 Gambian republic referendum	24 November 1965	monarchy retained	65.85	34.15	60.46	Required 2/3 majority.	
The Gambia	1970 Gambian republic referendum	April 1970	monarchy abolished	70.45	29.55	90.1		
Greece	1920 Greek referendum	22 November 1920	monarchy restored	-	-		Constantine I returned to the throne.	
Greece	1924 Greek republic referendum	13 April 1924	monarchy abolished	69.98	30.02		On 25 March 1924, the Second Hellenic Republic was proclaimed.	
Greece	1935 Greek monarchy referendum	3 November 1935	monarchy restored	2.1	97.9		The referendum is viewed as having not been free or fair.	
Greece	1946 Greek referendum	1 September 1946	monarchy retained	31.6	68.4	86.6		
Greece	1973 Greek republic referendum	29 July 1973	monarchy abolished	78.6	21.4	75.0		
Greece	1974 Greek republic referendum	8 December 1974	republic retained	69.2	30.8	75.6	The Junta had already staged a plebiscite held on 29 July 1973, which resulted in the establishment of the Republic. However, after the fall of the military regime, the new government, under Constantine Karamanlis, decided to hold another one, as Junta legal acts were considered illegal.	
Iceland	1944 Icelandic constitutional referendum	between 20 and 23 May 1944	monarchy abolished	98.5	1.5	98.4		
Iran	1979 (March) Iranian Islamic Republic referendum	30 and 31 March 1979	monarchy abolished	99.3	0.7	98		
Italy	1946 Italian institutional referendum	2 June 1946	monarchy abolished	54.3	45.7	89.1		
Luxembourg	1919 Luxembourg referendum	28 September 1919	monarchy retained	19.7	80.3	72.1		
Maldives	1952 Maldivian constitutional referendum	17 and 18 April 1952	monarchy abolished	96	4			
Maldives	1953 Maldivian constitutional referendum	August 1953	monarchy restored	2.0	98.0			
Maldives	1968 Maldivian constitutional referendum	15 March 1968	monarchy abolished	81.23	18.77	93.35		
Mexico	1863 Mexican emperor referendum	4 December 1863	monarchy restored	0	100	74.76	Second Mexican Empire was created; Archduke Maximilian of Austria installed as Maximilian I of Mexico.	
Norway	1905 Norwegian monarchy referendum	12 and 13 November 1905	monarchy retained	21.06	78.94	75.3		
Rhodesia	1969 Rhodesian constitutional referendum	20 June 1969	monarchy abolished	81.01	18.99	80.97		
Rwanda	1961 Rwandan monarchy referendum	25 September 1961	monarchy abolished	79.85	20.15	95.31		
Saint Vincent and the Grenadines	2009 Vincentian constitutional referendum	25 November 2009	monarchy retained	43.71	56.29	53.48		
Kingdom of Sikkim	1975 Sikkimese monarchy referendum	14 April 1975	monarchy abolished	97.55	2.45	63.02	Sikkim was annexed by India a month later.	
South Africa	1960 South African republic referendum	5 October 1960	monarchy abolished	52.29	47.71	90.77		
Spain	1947 Spanish law of succession referendum	6 July 1947	monarchy restored	4.9	95.1	88.6	It was a referendum with no democratic guarantees, carried out by a totalitarian state. It appointed Francisco Franco, the current Dictator, as head of state for life until Franco's death or resignation, but also granted him the power to appoint his successor as King or Regent of the Kingdom and thereby formally establish a new Kingdom of Spain.	
Tuvalu	2008 Tuvaluan constitutional referendum	30 April 2008	monarchy retained	35.02	64.98			
Vietnam	1955 State of Vietnam referendum	23 October 1955	monarchy abolished	98.91	1.09	108.42		

== Referendums to choose or confirm a new monarch or to change the rules of succession ==
Country	Referendum	Date	Question	Result	Vote breakdown	Turnout [%]	Comments
Belgium	1950 Belgian monarchy referendum	12 March 1950	Whether King Leopold III should return, have his royal powers and duties restored and the regency of Prince Charles, Count of Flanders be terminated	King Leopold III returned, with powers and duties restored	57.68% in favor, 42.32% opposed	92.92	King Leopold III gave up his powers and duties in August 1950, making his eldest son Baudouin, regent. Leopold III later abdicated in July 1951, in favour of Baudouin.
Denmark	1953 Danish constitutional and electoral age referendum	28 May 1953	Whether agnatic primogeniture should be abolished in determining succession to the Danish throne and replaced with male-preference primogeniture	Male-preference primogeniture adopted	78.8% in favoir, 21.2% opposed	59.1	
Denmark	2009 Danish Act of Succession referendum	7 June 2009	Whether male-preference primogeniture should be abolished in determining succession to the Danish throne and replaced with absolute primogeniture	Absolute primogeniture adopted	85.3% in favour, 14.6% opposed	58.32	40% of electorate votes were required for the change of the act of succession to pass the referendum. 45.16% of the electorate voted in favour of the change.
Greece	1862 Greek head of state referendum	19 November 1862	Who if anyone should succeed Otto as King of the Hellenes after his deposition	Prince Alfred of the United Kingdom should be installed as the new monarch	-		Prince Alfred declined the Greek throne due to pressure from the British government and from his mother, Queen Victoria; Prince William of Denmark was later installed as George I of Greece.
Romania	1866 Romanian prince referendum	20 April 1866	Whether Prince Prince Karl Ludwig of Hohenzollern-Sigmaringen should be installed as Domnitor of Romania after the ouster of Alexandru Ioan Cuza	Prince Karl Ludwig confirmed	99.97% in favor, 0.03% opposed	84.60	Prince Karl Ludwig was immediately installed as Domnitor Carol I. His status was elevated to that of King in 1881.

== See also ==
- Independence referendum
