= Jameel family =

Maldivian descended family

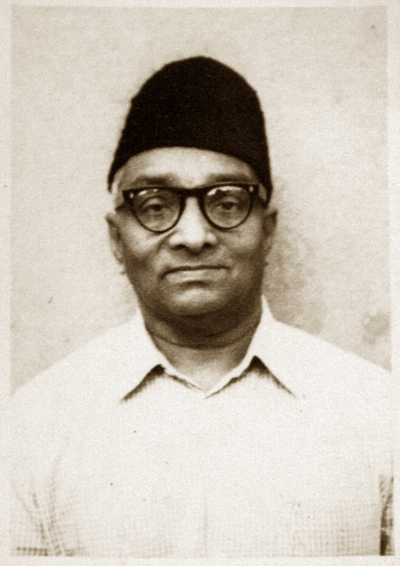
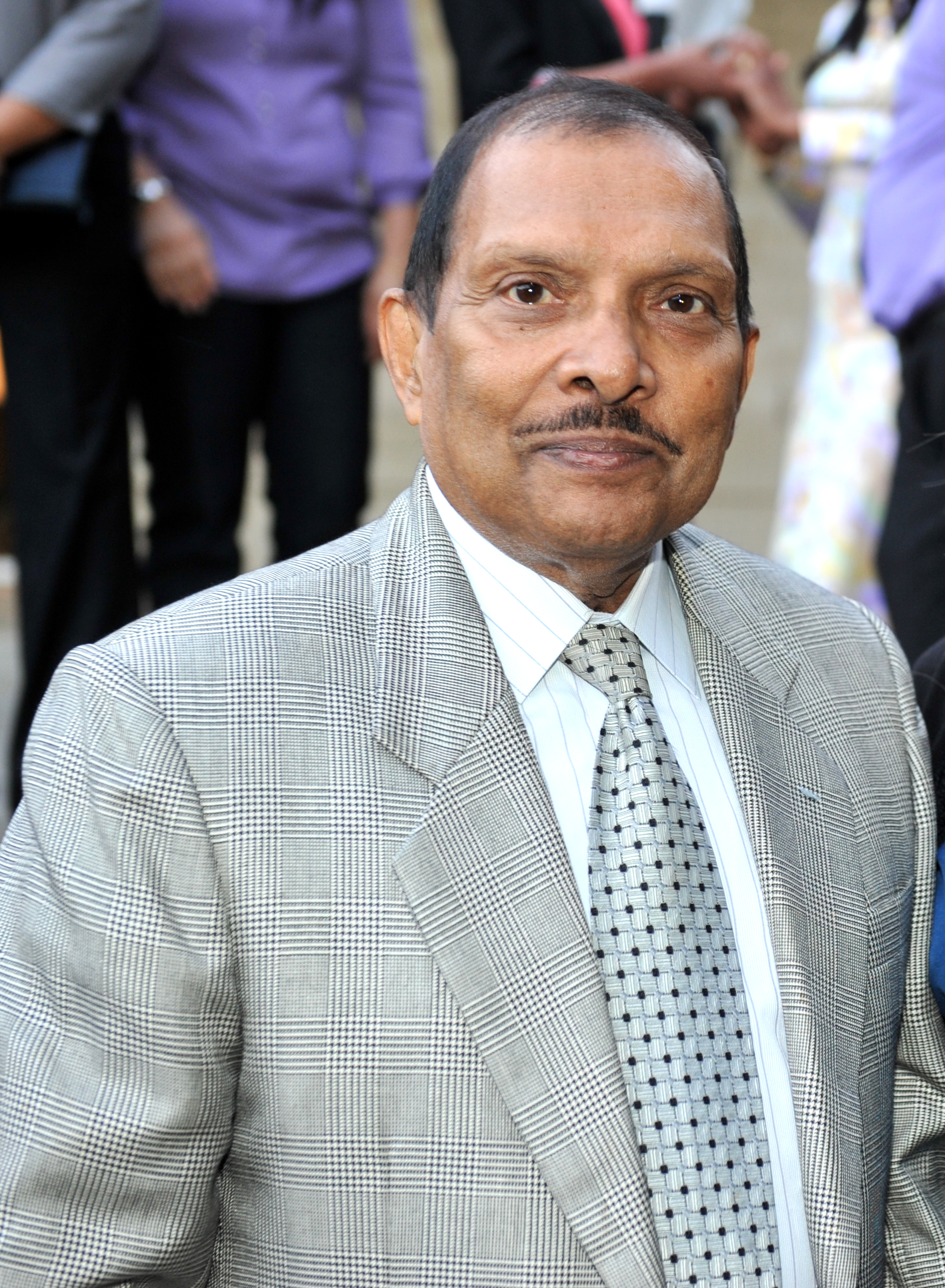
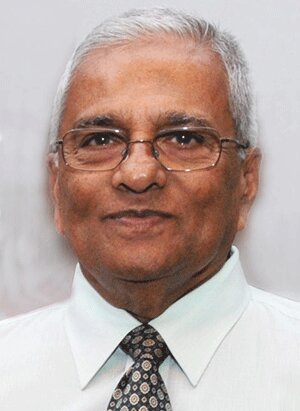
- Mohamed Jameel Didi Fathulla Jameel Abdulla Jameel
- Country: Maldives
- Current region: Malé
- Origin: Malé, Maldive Islands
- Founder: Mohamed Jameel Didi
- Members: Mohamed Jameel Didi; Fathulla Jameel; Abdulla Jameel; Jadulla Jameel; Aminath Jameel; Fathimath Jameel; Hassan Zareer
- Connected members: Zahiya Zareer; Zeeniya Zareer; Zarana Zareer; Ahmed Zareer; Mauroof Jameel
- Connected families: Salahuddin family

The Jameel family is a Maldivian descended political family that are active in law, politics, and health. The immediate family of Mohamed Jameel Didi includes his five children.

== Immediate family ==
=== Children ===
==== Fathulla Jameel ====
Fathulla Jameel was a Maldivian diplomat and politician who served as the Minister of Foreign Affairs of Maldives from 1978 to 2005. He was the son of Mohamed Jameel Didi.

==== Abdulla Jameel ====
Abdulla Jameel was a Maldivian politician and statesman who served as Minister of Tourism from 1991 to 1993. He had also served other ministerial positions during the Gayoom administration. He was the oldest son of Mohamed Jameel Didi.

==== Fathimath Jameel ====
Fathimath Jameel was a Maldivian politician and women's rights activist who served as the President's Member to the People's Majlis from 1989 to 2000. She was the eldest daughter of Mohamed Jameel Didi.

==== Aminath Jameel ====
Aminath Jameel is a Maldivian politician who served as the Minister of Health and Family from 2008 to 2012. She is the daughter of Mohamed Jameel Didi.

==== Jadulla Jameel ====
Jadulla Jameel was the son of Mohamed Jameel Didi.

== Other relations ==
=== Hussain Salahuddin ===
Hussain Salahuddin was a Maldivian poet, writer, and religious scholar who served as the Attorney General of the Maldives from 1900 to 1928. He is the uncle of Mohamed Jameel Didi.

=== Zahiya Zareer ===
Zahiya Zareer is a Maldivian politician and diplomat who served as the Ambassador of the Maldives to Sri Lanka from 2014 to 2017 as well as the Minister of Education from 2005 to 2008. She is the granddaughter of Mohamed Jameel Didi.
