= National symbols of the Maldives =

The Maldives has numerous national symbols, including a national flower, tree, and animal, which were adopted in 1985. The Maldivian national flag and emblem, adopted in 1965, are also considered national symbols.

== Symbols ==
The following is a list of the national symbols of the Maldives.

=== Official symbols ===
Title	Name of Symbol	Picture
National flag	Flag of Maldives	
National emblem	National Emblem of Maldives	
National anthem	Gaumee Salaam by Mohamed Jameel Didi	
National language	Dhivehi	
National flower	Pinkrose (Rosa × damascena )	
National tree	Coconut Palm (Cocos nucifera)	
National bird	White-breasted waterhen (Kanbili)	
National animal	Yellowfin Tuna (Thunnus albacares)	

=== Unofficial symbols ===
Title	Name of Symbol	Picture
National Fruit	Passion Fruit	
National dress (female)	Dhivehi Libaas	
National dress (male)	Maldivian Sarong (Mundu)	
National sport	Football	
