= Fathimath Jameel =

Maldivian politician and women's rights activist (died 2020)

- ފާޠިމަތު ޖަމީލް

Deputy Minister of Youth, Women's Affairs and Sports
- In office 1993–2000
- President: Maumoon Abdul Gayoom

President's Member to the People's Majlis
- In office 1989–2000
- President: Maumoon Abdul Gayoom
- Speaker: Abdulla Hameed; Ahmed Zahir

Personal details
- Born: 1937 or 1938 Malé, Maldive Islands
- Died: 4 April 2020 Indira Gandhi Memorial Hospital, Malé, Maldives
- Spouse: Hassan Zareer
- Relations: Jameel family
- Children: 4, including Zahiya
- Parents: Mohamed Jameel Didi (father); Kulhavage Sithi (mother)

Fathimath Jameel (Dhivehi: ފާޠިމަތު ޖަމީލް; 1937 or 1938–4 April 2020) was a Maldivian politician and women's rights activist who served as the President's Member to the People's Majlis from 1989 to 2000. She also served as the Deputy Minister of Youth, Women's Affairs and Sports from 1993 to 2000.

== Career ==
Jameel began her public service as a teacher at Madharusathul Salahiyya. Later on, she became the president of the Women’s Committee. She had filled the positions of Director at the Office for Women’s Affairs and the Director General at the Department of Women's Affairs. She had also attended many of the 1975, 1980, and the 1985 World Conference on Women representing the Maldives. In 1989, president Maumoon Abdul Gayoom appointed her as the President's Member to the People's Majlis, a role she fulfilled until February 2000. She was also appointed as the Deputy Minister of Youth, Women's Affairs and Sports from its creation in 1993 to 2000.

== Personal life ==
Jameel is the eldest daughter of Mohamed Jameel Didi, the former religious scholar and Attorney General of the Maldives. She's the wife of former vice president Hassan Zareer and they had four children together; Zahiya Zareer, Zeeniya Zareer, Zarana Zareer, and Ahmed Zareer.

=== Death ===
Jameel died on 4 April 2020 at Indira Gandhi Memorial Hospital during a checkup. Family members described her death as sudden and unforeseen. President Ibrahim Mohamed Solih conveyed his condolences to her brother Abdulla Jameel. Her cousin and then Foreign affairs minister Abdulla Shahid described her as a "beacon of hope for women at a time where challenges for gender equality were abundant."
