= Zahiya Zareer =

Maldivian politician and diplomat (born 1959)

- ޒާހިޔާ ޒަރީރު
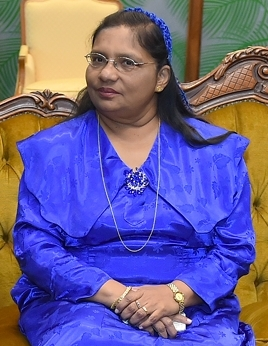
- Zareer in 2017

High Commissioner of the Maldives to Sri Lanka
- In office 19 May 2014 – 13 August 2017
- President: Abdulla Yameen

Minister of Education
- In office 14 July 2005 – 10 November 2008
- President: Maumoon Abdul Gayoom
- Preceded by: Mahamood Shougee
- Succeeded by: Mustafa Lutfi

Minister of Gender
- In office 2004–2005
- President: Maumoon Abdul Gayoom

Personal details
- Born: 30 December 1959 (age 66) Durdans Hospital, Colombo, Dominion of Ceylon (now Sri Lanka)
- Relations: Jameel family
- Parent(s): Hassan Zareer (father); Fathimath Jameel (mother)
- Occupation: Ambassador-at-Large

Zahiya Zareer, (Dhivehi: ޒާހިޔާ ޒަރީރު; born 30 December 1959) is a Maldivian politician, diplomat, and former teacher who served as the High Commissioner and Ambassador of the Maldives to Sri Lanka from 2014 to 2017. She previously served as the Minister of Education from 2005 to 2008.

== Career ==
Zahiya began to work for the Maldivian government in 1983. Her first role was as an English language teacher, from which she worked to become the Minister of Education from 2005 to 2008. From 2004 to 2005 she held the post of Minister of Gender, Family Development & Social Security. During her time as Minister for Education, almost half of Maldivian teachers went on strike. She also established Teacher Resource Centres, which were designed to enable a greater number of teachers to access professional development for child-centred active learning.

On 13 February 2014, Zahiya was appointed by President Abdulla Yameen as High Commissioner to Sri Lanka. She presented her credentials to the President of Sri Lanka in June 2014. During her time in Sri Lanka, the Maldives declared its withdrawal from the Commonwealth. As a result of this move, Zahiya's title was then changed to Ambassador. During her time in Sri Lanka, she was involved in a diplomatic dispute after a 'bomb plot suspect' was expelled from the country. On 13 August 2017, the Maldivian government dismissed her from the post. She was then appointed Ambassador-at-Large at the Ministry of Foreign Affairs of the Government of the Maldives.

== Personal life ==
Zahiya was born on 39 December 1959 at Durdans Hospital in Colombo, Dominion of Ceylon. She is the daughter of former vice president Hassan Zareer and women's rights activist Fathimath Jameel.

Zahiya is married and has one son and one daughter; her hobbies include reading, writing poetry and gardening. Zahiya is also an expert in Divehi.
