= Ibrahim Mohamed Didi =

Maldivian retired military officer and politician

Brigadier General (Retired) Ibrahim Didi
- އިބްރާހީމް މުހައްމަދު ދީދީ

Member of the People's Majlis
- In office 28 May 2014 – 28 May 2019
- Constituency: Hithadhoo Central

Chairman of the State Electric Company Limited
- Incumbent
- Assumed office 15 June 2022

Personal details
- Born: Hithadhoo, Addu City, Maldives
- Party: Maldivian Democratic Party
- Parent: Mohamed Ibrahim Didi (father)
- Relatives: Aishath Mohamed Didi (sister)
- Education: Master's degree in philosophy
- Occupation: Military officer and politician

Military service
- Allegiance: Maldives
- Branch/service: Maldives National Defence Force
- Years of service: 1979–2012
- Rank: Brigadier general
- Commands: MNDF Southern Area Command; MNDF Malé Area Command
- Battles/wars: 1988 Maldives coup attempt

Ibrahim Mohamed Didi is a Maldivian retired military officer and politician. He served in the Maldivian military for approximately 32 years, rising from the rank of private to brigadier general. He commanded both the Malé Area and Southern Area commands of the Maldives National Defence Force (MNDF).

Following his retirement from the military, Didi entered politics and represented the Hithadhoo Central constituency in the People's Majlis. In June 2022, he was appointed chairman of the State Electric Company Limited (STELCO).

== Early life and family ==
Didi is from Hithadhoo in Addu City. His father, Mohamed Ibrahim Didi, was a long-serving government official who served as deputy island chief, island chief, secretary to the Addu Atoll chief and later as Atoll chief.

His sister, Aishath Mohamed Didi, has served in the Maldivian government, including as a cabinet minister.

Didi obtained a master's degree in philosophy from a defence college in India.

== Military career ==
Didi joined the Maldivian military in 1979 as a private. During his career, the country's armed forces were initially known as the National Security Service before being renamed the Maldives National Defence Force.

He rose through the military ranks and was eventually promoted to brigadier general. His senior appointments included command of the MNDF Malé Area Command and the Southern Area Command.

=== 1988 coup attempt ===
During the 1988 Maldives coup attempt, Didi was serving as a corporal in the National Security Service. According to his account, he was instructed to assist in protecting President Maumoon Abdul Gayoom after mercenaries attacked the military headquarters in Malé.

Didi stated that he was ordered to obtain the keys to the military armoury from the residence of the deputy defence minister. After finding the keys, he made his way towards the besieged military headquarters and delivered them over the compound wall.

The Maldives Independent described his actions during the attack as instrumental in the defence of the government.

=== Senior commands ===
Didi served as commander of the MNDF Malé Area during the administration of President Mohamed Nasheed. After the change of government in February 2012, he was transferred from the Malé Area Command to the Southern Area Command.

=== Retirement ===
Didi retired from the MNDF on 16 July 2012 after approximately 32 years of military service. He subsequently described his departure as a “premature retirement”.

At the time of his retirement, the Prosecutor General's Office had filed a case relating to the military detention of Criminal Court Chief Judge Abdulla Mohamed in January 2012.

== Political career ==
Following his military retirement, Didi became active in politics as a member of the Maldivian Democratic Party.

=== Member of Parliament ===
Didi was elected to the People's Majlis from the Hithadhoo Central constituency in the 2014 parliamentary election. He served in the 18th People's Majlis from May 2014 until May 2019.

During his parliamentary term, Didi participated in debates concerning national defence, foreign relations and the strategic importance of Addu Atoll. In 2018, he stated that Maldivian territory should not be made available for the military purposes of another country.

He also argued that the country's defence and foreign policies should safeguard Maldivian independence while maintaining relations with neighbouring countries.

== Legal proceedings ==
Didi was one of several former senior government and military officials charged in connection with the January 2012 detention of Criminal Court Chief Judge Abdulla Mohamed.

The case involved former president Mohamed Nasheed, former defence minister Tholhath Ibrahim, former chief of defence force Moosa Ali Jaleel, Colonel Mohamed Ziyad and Didi. Didi denied responsibility for unlawfully detaining the judge.

The charges against Didi were later withdrawn and subsequently refiled. In 2018, the Criminal Court rejected the terrorism charge filed against him.

== Corporate appointment ==
On 15 June 2022, the Privatisation and Corporatisation Board appointed Didi as a member and chairman of the board of directors of the State Electric Company Limited.

He succeeded Mohamed Rasheed, who died in December 2021.

== Personal life ==
Didi is the son of Mohamed Ibrahim Didi, a recipient of the Maldives National Award for Public Service. His father served the government for more than 43 years and was involved in the administration and development of Hithadhoo.

== See also ==
- Maldives National Defence Force
- 1988 Maldives coup attempt
- People's Majlis
- Hithadhoo
- Addu City
