= Salaamathi =

National anthem of the Sultanate of Maldive Islands

English: Safety
- Dhivehi: ސަލާމަތީ
- National anthem of the Sultanate of Maldives
- Relinquished: 1948
- Succeeded by: Qaumee Salaam

Salaamathi (Dhivehi: ސަލާމަތީ, romanized: Salaamathee) was the instrumental national anthem of the Sultanate of Maldives until 1948. The name means "Safety" in Dhivehi language.

It was played by the royal band on state occasions at the Etherekoilu, the Sultan's residence, usually preceded by a seven-gun salute from the Aa-Kotte Buruzu bastion inside.

== See also ==
- Qaumee Salaam
- Maldives
- Sultanate of the Maldive Islands
- Emblem of the Maldives
- Flag of the Maldives
