= Fathulla Jameel =

Maldivian diplomat and politician (1942–2012)

Fathulla Jameel NIIV
- ފަތުހުﷲ ޖަމީލް
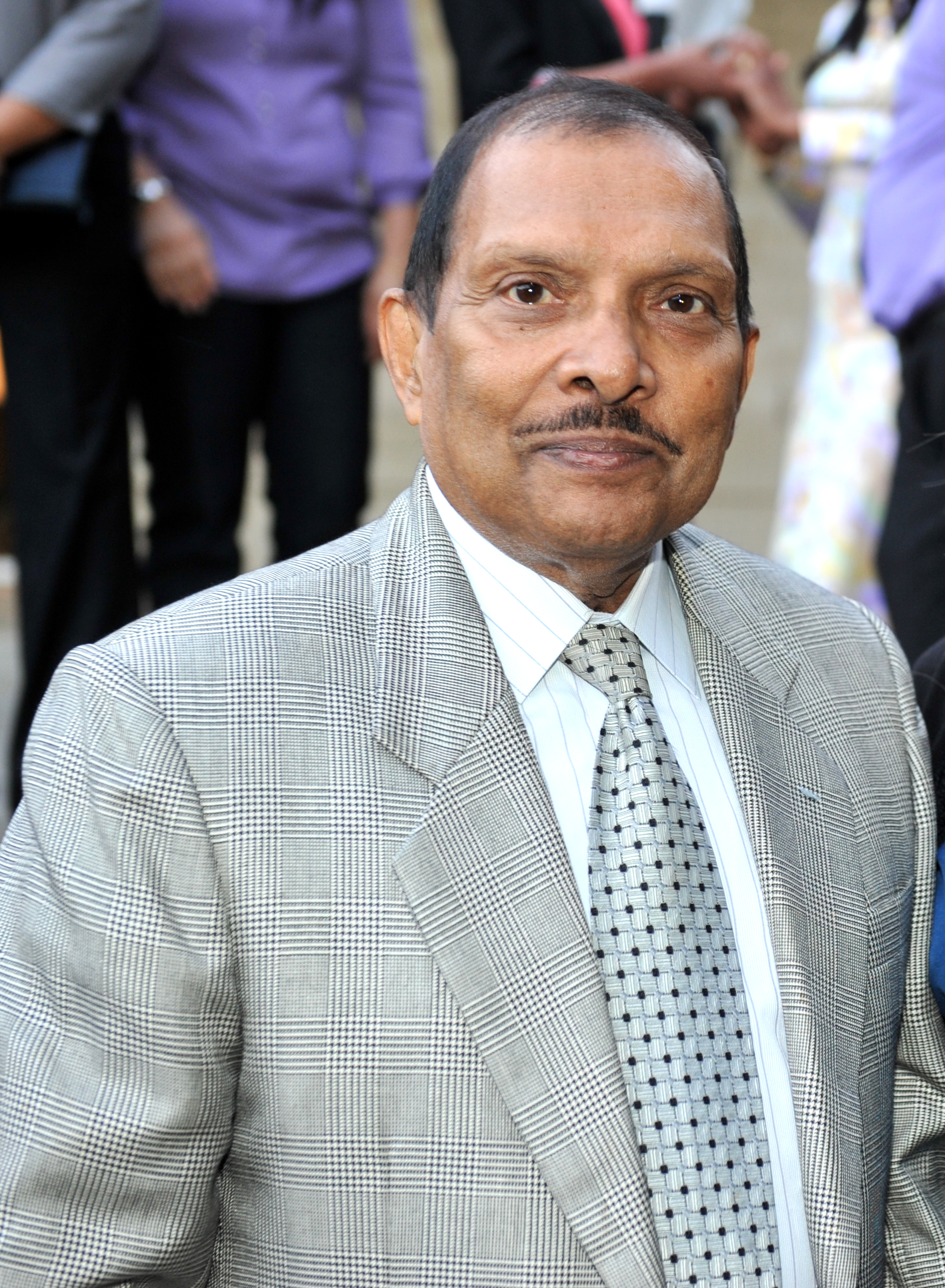

Minister of Foreign Affairs
- In office 14 March 1978 – 14 July 2005
- President: Ibrahim Nasir; Maumoon Abdul Gayoom
- Preceded by: Ahmed Zaki
- Succeeded by: Ahmed Shaheed

Permanent Representative of the Maldives to the United Nations
- In office 14 April 1977 – 1978
- Preceded by: Maumoon Abdul Gayoom
- Succeeded by: Ahmed Zaki

Senior Minister
- In office 30 April 2008 – 11 November 2008
- President: Maumoon Abdul Gayoom
- Preceded by: Position created
- Succeeded by: Position abolished

Personal details
- Born: 5 September 1942
- Died: 1 March 2012 (aged 69) Singapore General Hospital
- Relations: Jameel family
- Parent: Mohamed Jameel Didi

Fathulla Jameel, NIIV (Dhivehi: ފަތުހުﷲ ޖަމީލް; 5 September 1942 – 1 March 2012) was a Maldivian diplomat and politician who served as the Minister of Foreign Affairs of Maldives from 1978 to 2005.

Jameel was the Permanent Representative of the Maldives to the United Nations from 14 April 1977 to 1978. He became Minister of Foreign Affairs on 14 March 1978 and, under presidents Ibrahim Nasir and Maumoon Abdul Gayoom, held that position for 27 years. On 14 July 2005, he resigned as Minister of Foreign Affairs and was instead appointed as a Special Advisor to the President. On 30 April 2008, he was sworn into the position of senior minister, a relatively new post created by the then incumbent president Gayoom.

== Early career and government service ==
Fathulla began his public service career on 18 November 1969, as a teacher at Majeediyya School. He became the Minister of External Affairs during the presidency of Ibrahim Nasir, on 14 March 1978.

When Maumoon Abdul Gayoom became President, Fathulla was reappointed as Minister of External Affairs towards the end of 1978. He remained at that position until his resignation in July 2005. After resignation, he served as Special Advisor to the President.

In an obituary, Haveeru Daily described him as the father of Maldives foreign diplomacy.

Fatuhulla also served as Minister of State for Planning and Environment at one time. He also was the President’s Member at the People’s Majlis for a long time.

=== Education and life in Egypt ===
Fathulla Jameel studied in Al-Azhar University of Egypt and obtained a BA in Islamic Theology.

Fathulla was the second generation to study in Egypt. Before him his father, Mohamed Jameel Didi studied in Egypt during King Fuad and Farooq's reign.

Peers described him as an intelligent person and his many skills include drawing, singing and playing guitar and was known to crack jokes that go along with the occasion.

== Death ==
Fathulla Jameel died on Thursday, 1 March 2012 at MVT 8:15 (UTC) at Singapore General Hospital from heart disease. He was 69. Maldives President Mohamed Waheed Hassan Manik sent his condolences for the family and declared the national flag to be flown at half mast for three days.
