= Mauroof Jameel =

Maldivian architect (born 1960)

Mohamed Mauroof Jameel
- މުޙައްމަދު މަޢުރޫފް ޖަމީލް
- Portrait, 2025

Managing director of Housing Development Corporation
- In office 22 December 2024 – 30 July 2025
- Preceded by: Ibrahim Fazul Rasheed
- Succeeded by: Ali Zuhair

Minister of Construction and Public Infrastructure
- In office 14 July 2005 – 11 November 2008
- President: Maumoon Abdul Gayoom

Personal details
- Born: 1960 (age 65–66) Malé, Maldives
- Relations: Jameel family
- Parent: Abdulla Jameel
- Education: Manchester Metropolitan University (BA); University of Sheffield (Diploma); University of Malaya (MSc)

Mohamed Mauroof Jameel (Dhivehi: މުޙައްމަދު މަޢުރޫފް ޖަމީލް; born 1960) is a Maldivian architect who served as the minister of construction and public infrastructure of the Maldives from 2005 to 2008. He also served as the managing director of the Housing Development Corporation from 2024 to 2025.

== Early life and education ==
Mohamed Mauroof Jameel was born in 1960 to Abdulla Jameel at Malé, Maldives. He studied at Manchester Metropolitan University and obtained his Bachelor of Arts in 1991. Additionally, he received his Diploma in Tropical Architecture at University of Sheffield in 1993. He also got his Master of Science in Architecture from the University of Malaya in 2012. He also became accredited by the Royal Institute of British Architects in 1991.

== Career ==
Jameel started working for the Maldivian government on 30 June 1979 as the English Secretary for the FIsheries Division, his responsibilities being painting and stamping shirts. He then joined the Office for Physical Planning and Design on 9 July 1983 as a draftsman, fulfilling the roles of director, supervisor, and director general. In 2001, Jameel joined the Hulhumalé Development Unit as a director general.

On 14 July 2005, President Maumoon Abdul Gayoom appointed Jameel as the Minister of Construction and Public Infrastructure, where he remained until Gayoom's presidency ended in November 2008. During his time there, he worked on the development of the People's Majlis building and designed and development many of the Maldives’ island resorts, and carved a painting in the Islamic Centre.

Jameel was also a member of the Ministry of Housing, Land and Urban Development's Housing Advisory Committee, Maldives' National Planning Advisory Committee, and the Maldives Architectual Association. Jameel also served as a member of Kyoto University's Maritime Asia Heritage Survey, CSEAS International Advisory Board member, and the Oxford Centre for Islamic Studies' Maldives Heritage Survey International Advisory Board member. He became a member of International Council on Monuments and Sites since 2017 and has been a chartered architect of the Royal Institute of British Architects since 2004.

In 2012, Jameel started researching coral stone mosques in the Maldives after restoring old mosques in Malaysia. He also published a book relating to coral stone mosques and an exhbition in 2017. His work led to the mosques being on the UNESCO's World Heritage Tentative List for the Maldives. In 2024, Jameel and Hamsha Hussain's work was featured at the Biennale of Sydney, documenting coral stone mosques. Jameel had also conducted research on the National Mueseum, Usgekolhu, and Esjehige. In 2026, Jameel launched an exhibition which showed early Maldivian resort architecture.

In 2024, Jameel was appointed as the managing director of the Housing Development Corporation following a request by President Mohamed Muizzu amid controversies surrounding the corporation. Jameel later retired in July 2025 and resigned from HDC.

== Publications ==
- Jameel, Mauroof; Ahmed, Yahya (2016). Coral Stone Mosques of the Maldives: The Vanishing Legacy Of The Indian Ocean. Gulf Pacific Press. ISBN 9780986281846.

== Awards ==
In 2025, President Mohamed Muizzu conferred Jameel with the National Award of Honour for his contributions to construction and architecture. In 1994, President Maumoon Abdul Gayoom presented Jameel with a special government award after he won best design at the 1991 Royal Institute of British Architect's Energy Efficient Housing Design competition. In 2022, the International Federation of Asian and Western Pacific Contractors' Associations awarded him with the Atsumi Award during their 45th convention in Malé. He also received the President's Gold Tourism Award in that year.
