= Aminath Jameel =

Maldivian politician and nurse

- އާމިނަތު ޖަމީލު
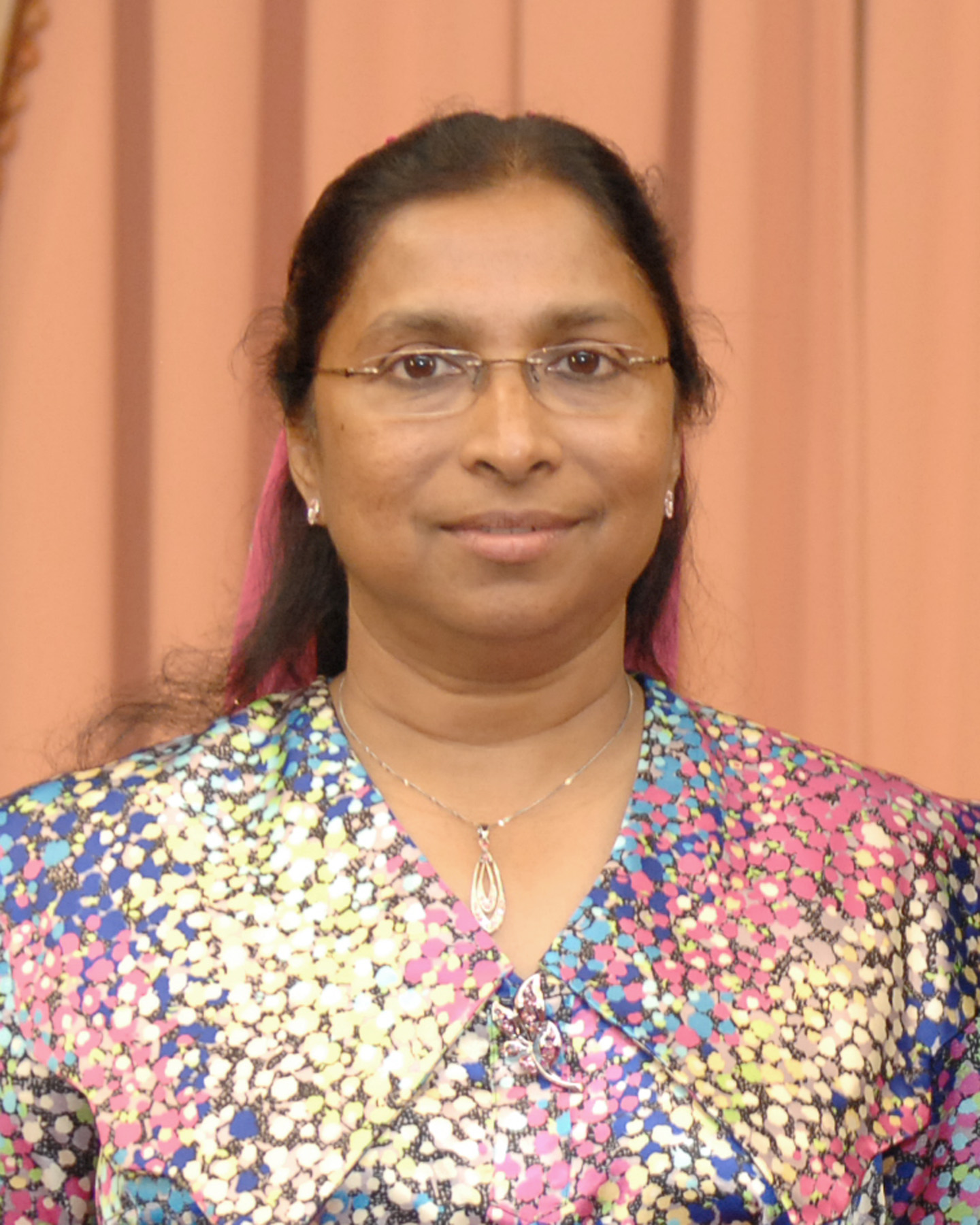
- Jameel in 2008

Minister of Health and Family
- In office 11 November 2008 – 7 February 2012
- President: Mohamed Nasheed
- Preceded by: Aishath Mohamed Didi
- Succeeded by: Ahmed Jamsheed Mohamed

Personal details
- Relations: Jameel family
- Parent: Mohamed Jameel Didi
- Education: University of Madras (MSc); La Trobe University (PhD)

Aminath Jameel (Dhivehi: އާމިނަތު ޖަމީލު) is a Maldivian politician and nurse who served as the Minister of Health and Family from 2008 to 2012.

== Early life and education ==
Jameel is the daughter of Mohamed Jameel Didi, the former attorney general of the Maldives. Jameel acquired an Master of Science from the University of Madras and a Doctor of Philosophy in Health Science from La Trobe University.

== Career ==
Jameel was appointed as the Minister of Health and Family on 11 November 2008. During her time in the government she served as a member of the Council for Higher Education, the ministerial committee to oversee prevention measures of swine flu, the taskforce to coordinate the dengue control programme, and the steering committee of the “Second Chance Programme”. She also served as the acting Minister of Fisheries and Agriculture.

== Awards ==
Jameel has received many international awards. In May 2011, she received the WHO No Tobacco Award 2011. She was also congratulated by president Mohamed Nasheed for her efforts. In October 2011, she received the Princess Srinagarindra Award for her role in expanding health services across the country. She was presented the award at the Grand Palace in the Chakri Maha Prasat Throne Hall by Princess Maha Chakri Sirindhorn.
