= Hithaadhoo =

Hithaadhoo refer to:

- Hithaadhoo (Baa Atoll), an inhabited island in the Maldives.
- Hithaadhoo (Gaafu Alif Atoll), an uninhabited island in the Maldives.

== See also ==
- Hithadhoo (disambiguation)
