= Shidhatha Shareef =

Maldivian politician

- ޝިދާތާ ޝަރީފް
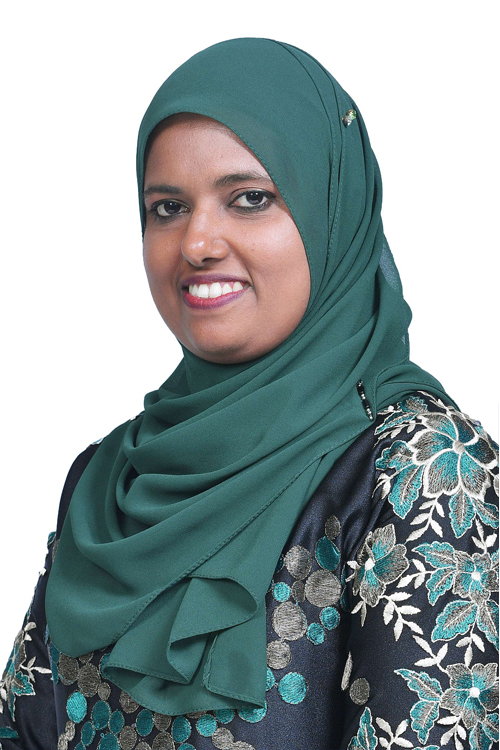
- Shareef in 2018

Minister of Gender, Family and Social Services
- In office 17 November 2018 – 6 February 2020
- President: Ibrahim Mohamed Solih
- Preceded by: Aminath Zenysha Shaheed Zaki
- Succeeded by: Aishath Mohamed Didi

Personal details
- Party: Maldives National Party (2021–present)
- Other political affiliations: Adhaalath Party (until 2021)

Shidhatha Shareef (Dhivehi: ޝިދާތާ ޝަރީފް) is a Maldivian politician who served as the Minister of Gender, Family and Social Services of the Maldives from 2018 to 2023. She also served as the Deputy Minister of Ministry of Health during the Waheed and Yameen administration from 2013 to 2015.

== Career ==
Shareef was appointed as the Deputy Minister of Health by president Mohamed Waheed Hassan on 23 April 2013. She resigned in 2015 saying that she couldn't defend the Yameen government's policies.

Shareef's passport was seized by the police which many opposition calling it a systemic attack on opposition figures.

In 2018, Shareef was appointed as the Minister of Gender, Family and Social Services by Ibrahim Mohamed Solih and was approved by the People's Majlis.

During her time as Minister of Gender, Family and Social Services, she's initiated reforms promoting women in leadership. In 2019, many called for her to resign for the way she handled the case of a 14-year-old boy escaped state care. She was questioned by the People's Majlis over the case. In 2020, calls for Shareef to resign resurfaced after the ministry knowingly awarded an alleged sex offender the position of honorary disability ambassador and a number of national awards. She later resigned amid growing public pressure and her resignation was accepted by president Ibrahim Mohamed Solih. The Adhaalath Party praised Shareef's measures to protect women and children.

In 2021, she left the Adhaalath Party and joined the Maldives National Party to be more politically involved.

In 2022, she was appointed as the Spokesperson for the Maldives National Party.
