= Mohamed Jameel Didi =

Maldivan politician and poet, writer of the Gaumee Salaam (1915–1989)

- މުޙައްމަދު ޖަމީލު ދީދީ
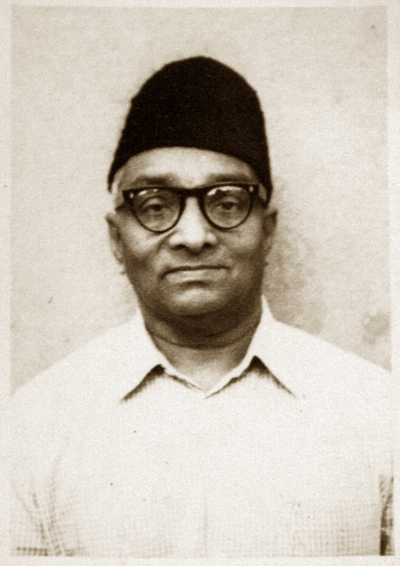

Attorney General
- In office 30 May 1956 – 11 September 1956
- Prime Minister: Ibrahim Nasir
- Preceded by: Ahmed Kamil Didi
- Succeeded by: Adnan Hussain

Minister of Justice
- In office 10 September 1953 – 30 May 1956
- Prime Minister: Ibrahim Nasir

Personal details
- Born: 1 May 1915 Malé, Maldive Islands
- Died: 15 March 1989 (aged 73) Malé, Maldives
- Resting place: Galolhu Cemetery, Galolhu, Malé, Maldives
- Spouse: Kulhavage Sithi
- Relations: Jameel family Salahuddin family
- Children: 5, including Fathulla, Fathimath, Abdulla, and Aminath
- Parent(s): Dharavandhooge Abdullah Didi (father); Aamina Didi (mother)
- Education: Majeediyya School; Al-Azhar University

Sheikh Mohamed Jameel Didi (Dhivehi: މުޙައްމަދު ޖަމީލު ދީދީ; 1 May 1915 – 15 March 1989) was a Maldivian politician and poet who was famous for his writings and speeches. He served as the minister of justice from 1953 to 1956, where he served as the Attorney General until his resignation in September 1956.

== Early life and education ==
He was born on 1 May 1915 to Abdullah Kamaaludhin the Attorney General and Fenfoa'ganduvaru Aminaa Didi. At first, he studied at the Majeedhiyya School and later went abroad to Egypt and studied at Al-Azhar University.

Jameel had five children. Fathulla Jameel, Fathimath Jameel, Abdulla Jameel, Aminath Jameel, and Jadhulla Jameel.

== Career ==
After returning, he became a member of the sentence committee (niyaa kanda alhaa komety). He served as the Deputy Minister of Interior, Deputy Principal of Majeediyya School, Deputy Attorney General, and the chief of the Maafannu district.

He later served as Minister of Justice from 10 September 1953 and as Attorney General from 30 May 1956 to 11 September 1956. Didi resigned as Attorney General amid a dispute between him and then–president Ibrahim Nasir.

Mohamed Jameel Didi had written many books. To help with Dhivehi grammar he wrote a book called "Fiyavalhu", and also "kudakudhinge bageecha 1" and "kudakudhinge bageecha 2", two Dhivehi children's books. He also wrote Islamic books such as "Thauleemuh Dhiyana" and "Dhuroosul Akhlaaq".

Gaumee Salaam (Maldives' national anthem) uses lyrics written by Jameel Didi in 1948 and until 1972 was sung to the tune of Auld Lang Syne which he heard on his uncle's alarm clock.

Many of Jameel's children and grandchildren were and are renowned politicians in the governments of Presidents Maumoon and Nasheed. Notable examples include Fathulla Jameel and Fathimath Jameel.

In 1979, Didi received the Public Service Award for his contributions in writing Maldivian Islamic books, contributions to the Maldivian language, and his contributions to Dhivehi poetry.

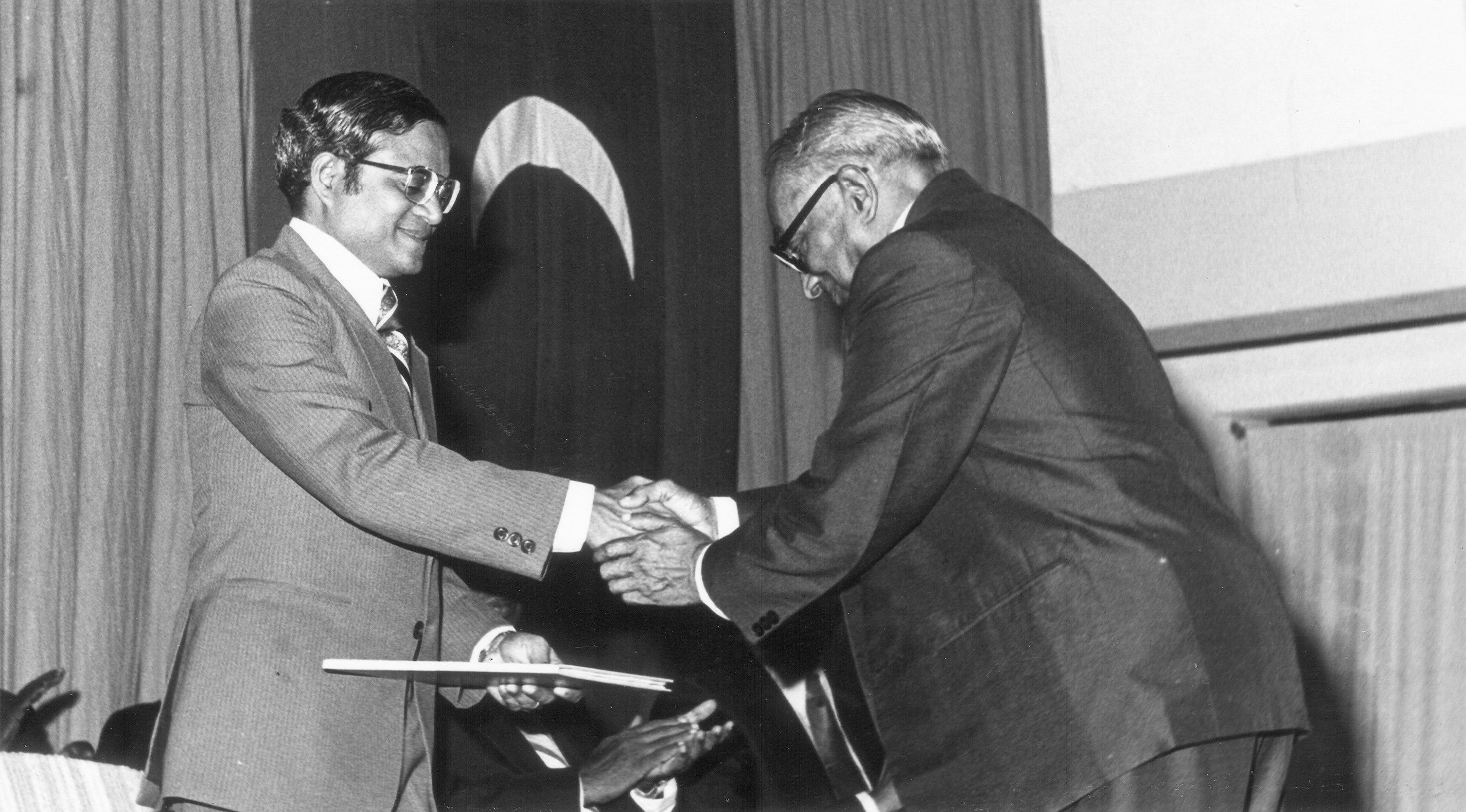
Didi (L) receiving the award from president Maumoon Abdul Gayoom (R)

== Death and impact ==
Sheikh Jameel Didi died on 15 March 1989, at the age of 73. He is buried at the Galolhu Cemetery. After his death, the honour of Usthazul Jeel (the teacher of the generation) was bestowed upon him by President Maumoon Abdul Gayoom.

Abdulla Hameed described him as the father of dhivehi writers and Maumoon Abdul Gayoom said that there was no Maldivian that didn't offer condolences to Didi.

In an editorial by Haveeru Daily, it was said that his contributions won't be erased from Maldivian soil.

A mosque was named after him and opened in Maafannu, Malé.

Mohamed Jameel was one of the foremost Maldivian learned men. He translated religious books and foreign tales or fables, adapting them to the island context, making a contribution to Maldivian folklore.

== See also ==
- Folklore of the Maldives
