= Abdulla Jameel =

Maldivian politician and statesman (died 2023)

Abdulla Jameel NIIV
- ޢަބްދުﷲ ޖަމީލް
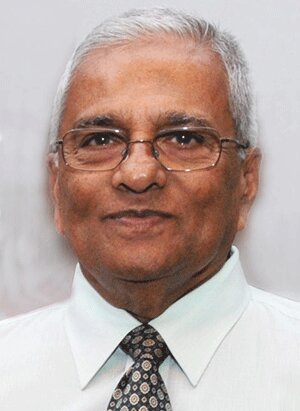

Minister of Home Affairs and Housing
- In office 6 November 1996 – 11 November 1998
- President: Maumoon Abdul Gayoom
- Preceded by: Himself
- Succeeded by: Ismail Shafeeu

Minister of Home Affairs
- In office 11 November 1993 – 6 November 1996
- President: Maumoon Abdul Gayoom
- Preceded by: Umar Zahir
- Succeeded by: Himself

Minister of Tourism
- In office 27 May 1991 – 10 November 1993
- President: Maumoon Abdul Gayoom
- Preceded by: Ismail Shafeeu
- Succeeded by: Ibrahim Hussain Zaki

Member of the People's Majlis
- In office 22 February 1975 – 23 February 1995
- President: Ibrahim Nasir; Maumoon Abdul Gayoom
- Constituency: Thaa Atoll
- In office 6 June 1964 – 21 February 1975
- President: Ibrahim Nasir
- Constituency: Kolhumadulu Atoll

Personal details
- Born: 1935 or 1936 Malé, Maldive Islands
- Died: 11 June 2023 Malé, Maldives
- Resting place: Galolhu cemetery, Galolhu, Malé, Maldives
- Relations: Jameel family
- Children: 5, including Mauroof Jameel
- Parent: Mohamed Jameel Didi

Abdulla Jameel NIIV (Dhivehi: ޢަބްދުﷲ ޖަމީލް; 1935 or 1936–11 June 2023) was a Maldivian politician and statesman who served as Minister of Tourism from 1991 to 1993. He has served other ministerial position such as Minister of Home Affairs, Minister of Fisheries and Agriculture, and Minister of Atoll Administration during the administration of Maumoon Abdul Gayoom.

== Career ==
Jameel's public service began as an observer at the Ministry of Communications in 1953. He held positions at the Ministry of Finance, Prime Minister's Office, Ministry of Home Affairs and the Coir and Cowries Advisory Board.

Jameel held positions during the Nasir administration, such as Special Undersecretary at various different government ministries such as the Ministry of Education and the Ministry of Justice.

During the Gayoom administration, Jameel was appointed as the president's private secretary and later on executive secretary in 1978. Jameel became Maldives' first Minister of State for Presidential Affairs. He was appointed as the Minister of Health in 1983, later on during Gayoom's cabinet reshuffing he served on as the Minister of Atoll Administration, Minister of Tourism, Minister of Home Affairs, Minister of Home Affairs and Housing, and Minister in the President's Office.

Jameel also served as a Member of the People's Majlis for Thaa Atoll from 6 June 1964 to 23 February 1995 as well as well as a member of the Special Majlis.

== Personal life ==
Jameel was the eldest son of Mohamed Jameel Didi. Jameel has five children.

=== Death ===
Jameel died on 11 June 2023 after a prolonged illness. His funeral prayer was held at Masjid al-Sultan Mohamed Thakurufaanu al-Auzam and he was buried at the Galolhu cemetery.

A book of condolences was opened at the President's Office for visitors to sign. President Ibrahim Mohamed Solih ordered the national flag to be flown half-mast for three days following Jameel's death. President Solih also met Jameel's family.

== Awards ==
In 2008, he received the Public Service Award and the Order of Izzuddin on the 25th anniversary of the independence of the Maldives.
