= Sultanate of the Maldive Islands =

Country in South Asia (1153–1953, 1954–1968)

Sultanate of the Maldive Islands: ދިވެހިރާއްޖެ (Dhivehi) Dhivehi Raajje
- 1153–1953; 1954–1968
- Flag; Early 20th century
- Motto: الدولة المحمية المحلديبية (Arabic); Ad-Dawlat Mahmiyyatul Mahaldibiyya "The Protected State of Mahal Dibiyat"
- Anthem: ސަލާމަތީ Salaamathi (1940–1968) "Safety"
- Capital: Malé; 4°10′31″N 73°30′32″E
- Official languages: Dhivehi
- Demonym: Maldive
- Government: Hereditary absolute monarchy (1153–1932); Elective constitutional monarchy (from 1932)
- Sultan
  - 1153–1165: Adil I
  - 1954–1968: Mohamed Fareed I
- Prime Minister
  - 1774 (first): Ali Ranna Bandeyri Kilegefan
  - 1957–1968 (last): Ibrahim Nasir
- Legislature: Hakuraa Gan'duvaru
- History
  - Sultanate established: 1153
  - Portuguese expelled: 1573
  - First republic declared: 1 January 1953
  - Sultanate restored: 6 March 1954
  - Independence from the United Kingdom: 26 July 1965
  - Monarchy abolished: 11 November 1968

Population
  - 1960 census: ▼91,650
- Currency: Cowries (until the 14th century); Larin (17th to 20th centuries); Ceylonese rupee and sterling (until 1947); Maldivian rupee (1947–1968)
Preceded by	Succeeded by
Kingdom of Dheeva Maari	Republic of Maldives; United Suvadive Republic

The Sultanate of the Maldive Islands was an Islamic monarchy that controlled the Maldives for over eight centuries (1153–1968), with one interruption from 1953–1954.

Maldives was a Buddhist kingdom until its last monarch, King Dhovemi, converted to Islam in the year 1153; thereafter he also adopted the Muslim title and name of Sultan Muhammad al-Adil. Six dynasties would rule over the Maldives until the sultanate become elective in 1932.

From the 16th century, the sultanate increasingly came under European influence, starting with a 15-year period of Portuguese rule. After the expulsion of the Portuguese, the Maldives became subject to Dutch hegemony before finally becoming a British protected state in 1796. (Note: De jure 1887) Following an abortive attempt at forming a republic in 1953, the emergence of a short-lived breakaway state, and the establishment of independence from the United Kingdom, the sultanate was abolished following a successful referendum in 1968, and the Maldives became a republic.

== Etymology ==
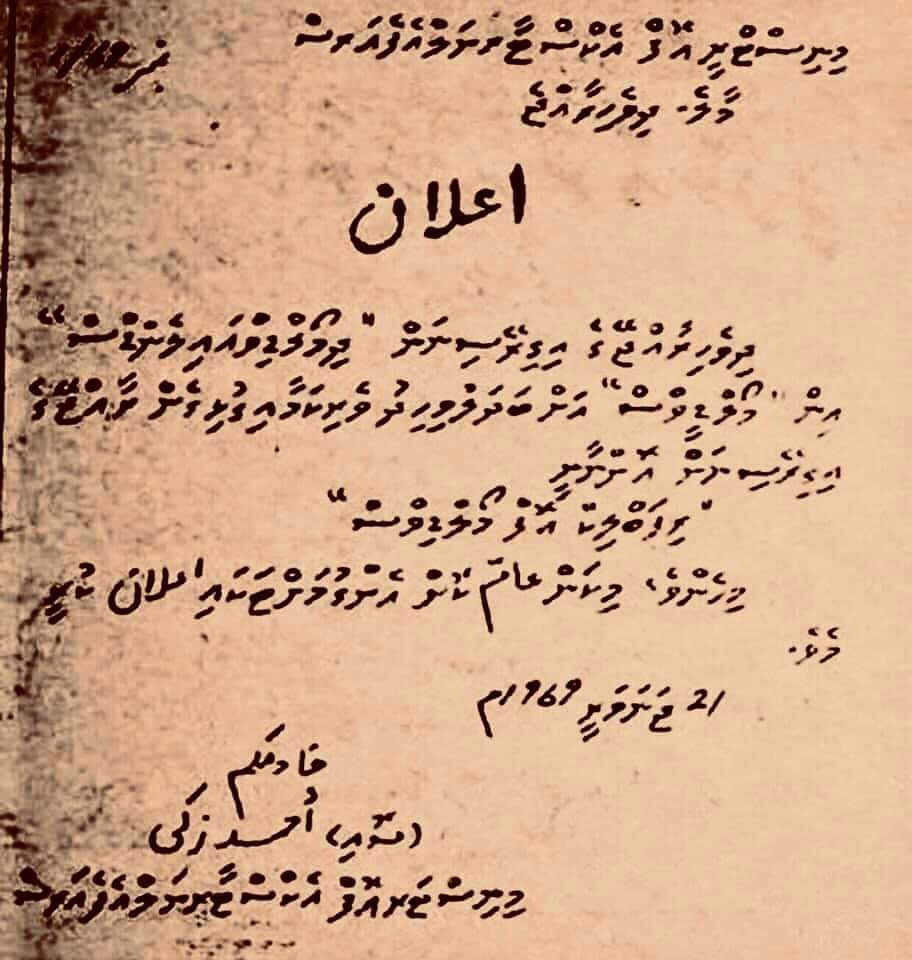
Announcement of the new name of the Maldive Islands, 21 January 1969.

The etymology of the term "Sultanate of Maldives" traces back to the historical and cultural roots of the Indian Ocean archipelago. The title "Sultan" denotes sovereignty and rulership, commonly associated with Islamic monarchies. In the case of the Maldives, the title was adopted during the era when the islands were governed by a succession of sultans, marking a significant period in Maldivian history. The term "Maldives" itself likely originates from the Sanskrit word "Maladvipa", meaning "garland of islands". Over time, this term evolved through various linguistic influences, including Arabic and Persian, reflecting the diverse cultural heritage of the Maldives. The combination of "Sultanate" and "Maldives" encapsulates the island nation's rich history, blending indigenous traditions with influences from the wider Indian Ocean world.

In the late 18th and early 19th centuries, Maldives was called Maldiva Islands in many English records, but by the beginning of the 20th century, Maldives or Maldive Islands had become the commonly used name. However, the official name of the Sultanate was the "Sultanate of the Maldive Islands". The first Kingdom of the Maldives was known as the Kingdom of Dheeva Maari. During the 3rd century BCE visit of emissaries, it was noted that the Maldives was known as Dheeva Mahal.

During c. 1100 – 1166, the Maldives was also referred to as Diva Kudha and the Laccadive archipelago which was a part of the Maldives was then referred to as Diva Kanbar by the scholar and polymath al-Biruni (973–1048).

On 21 January 1969, following its formation, the Maldives officially declared its name as the "Republic of Maldives". This pivotal announcement emanated from the Ministry of External Affairs in Malé, marking a significant juncture in the nation's narrative. The decision to embrace the appellation "Republic of Maldives" represented a crucial stride in affirming the sovereignty and distinctiveness of the nascent republic. The pronouncement explicitly stipulated that the English designation of Dhivehi Raajje, the local nomenclature for the Maldives, would be "Republic of Maldives" in all official governmental contexts. This declaration underscored the Maldives' metamorphosis from a sultanate to a contemporary republic, epitomizing its dedication to self-rule and global acknowledgment. In the Dhivehi language, the term "Republic of Maldives" is rendered as "ދިވެހިރާއްޖޭގެ ޖުމްހޫރިއްޔާ" (Dhivehi Raajjeyge Jumhooriyyaa).

== History ==
Much of the history of the Maldive Islands remains shrouded in mystery, yet insights gleaned from tales and available data suggest a habitation spanning over 2500 years, as recounted in ancient folklore from the southern atolls. Allama Ahmed Shihabuddine (known also as Allama Shihab al-Din) of Meedhoo in Addu Atoll chronicled this narrative in Arabic during the reign of Sultan Ibrahim Iskandar I in the 17th century. His work, titled "Kitab Fi al-Athari Midu al-Qadimiyyah" ("On the Ancient Ruins of Meedhoo"), offers a remarkable consistency with established South Asian history, including references to Emperor Asoka, the legendary Indian ruler. Moreover, it corroborates aspects of information preserved in old Maldivian records and the loamaafaanu copperplates. The saga of the Maldive Islands' legacy is recounted through legends of yore, inscriptions on ancient copperplates, writings etched onto coral artifacts, and perpetuated through the language, customs, and ethnicity of its inhabitants.

In contrast to the southern islands, situated up to 800 kilometers away, the northern islands likely have a distinct migratory and colonization history.

=== Introduction of Islam ===
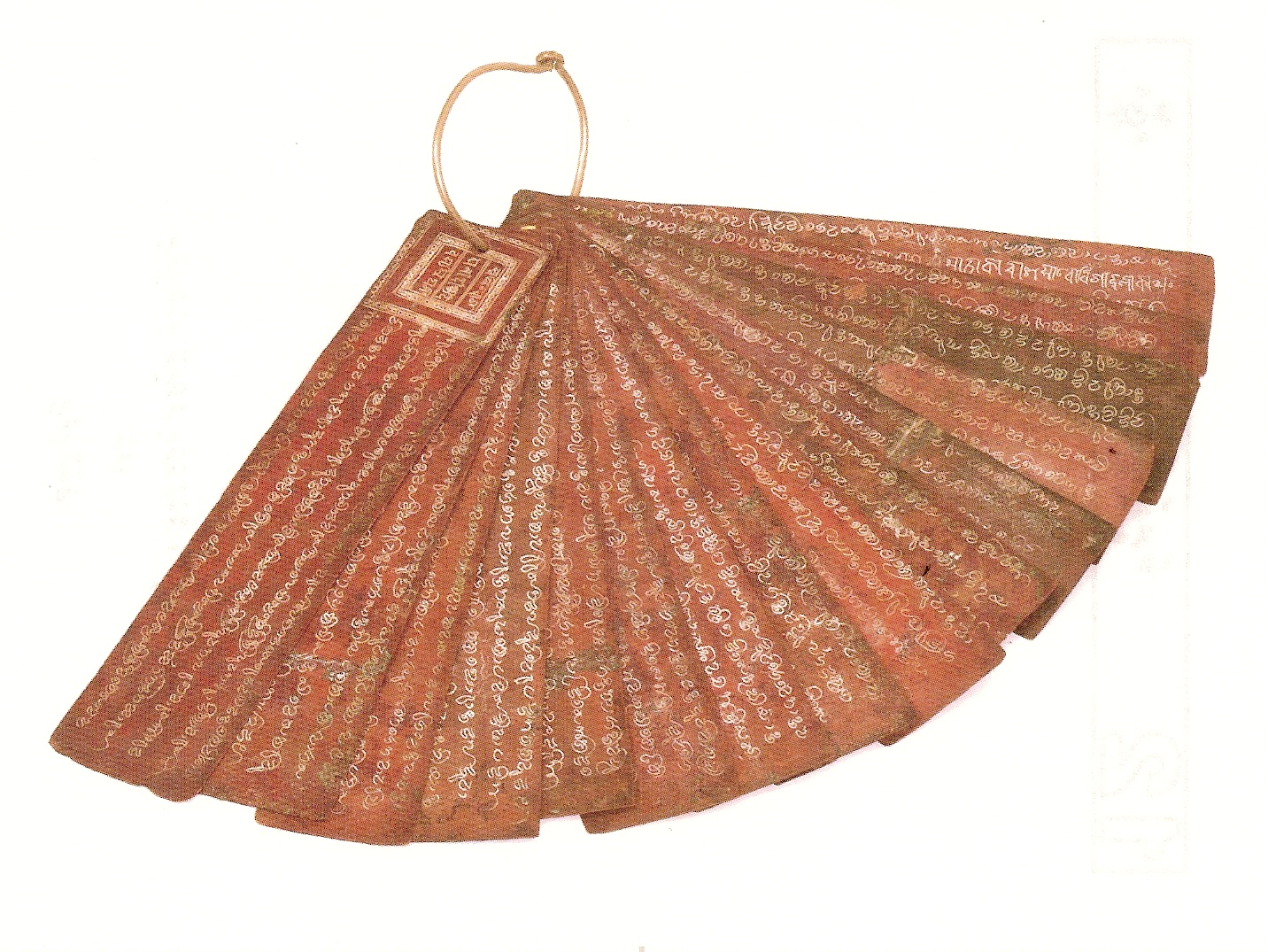
Isdhoo Lōmāfānu is the oldest copper-plate book to have been discovered in the Maldives to date.

The importance of the Arabs as traders in the Indian Ocean by the 12th century may partly explain why the last Buddhist king of Maldives Dhovemi converted to Islam in the year 1153 (or 1193, for certain copper plate grants give a later date). The king thereupon adopted the Muslim title and name (in Arabic) of Sultan (besides the old Dhivehi title of Maha Radun or Ras Kilege or Rasgefānu) Muhammad al-Adil, initiating a series of six Islamic dynasties consisting of eighty-four sultans and sultanas that lasted until 1932 when the sultanate became elective. The formal title of the Sultan up to 1965 was, Sultan of Land and Sea, Lord of the twelve-thousand islands and Sultan of the Maldives which came with the style Highness. The person traditionally deemed responsible for this conversion was a Sunni Muslim visitor named Abu al-Barakat Yusuf al-Barbari. His venerated tomb now stands on the grounds of Medhu Ziyaaraiy, opposite the Hukuru Mosque in the capital Malé. Built in 1656, this is the oldest mosque in Maldives.

Prior to Islamic rule, the Maldives had been united under a Buddhist monarchy since the third century BCE. Maldivan exposure to Islam originated from Middle Eastern sailors and merchants; the Maldivan archipelago's strategic location in the Indian Ocean and abundance of cowrie shells, a popular currency, proved lucrative.

In 1153, the Sunni visitor Abu al Bar-akat converted the last Buddhist monarch of the Maldives, King Dhovemi, to Islam. This would mark the beginning of the sultanate. For the next four centuries, the Sultanate would experience an era of peace and prosperity as its important Indian Ocean location allowed it to trade with much of Asia and Africa.

=== Portuguese and Dutch hegemony ===
The Portuguese arrived in the Maldives in 1507 and forced Sultan Kalu Muhammad to deliver an annual tribute of coir rope. In 1558, a Portuguese garrison was established on Malé and the Sultan was overthrown. Thus, the Maldives were administered from Portuguese Goa for the next 15 years, during which Christianity was forcefully imposed on the locals with the threat of execution. Hands of locals in Malé were cut off for refusing to renounce Islam, and in the end many perished and died in the subsequent years of genocide. In 1573, a popular revolt led by Muhammad Thakurufaanu al-Auzam drove the Portuguese away from the islands and reestablished Maldivan sovereignty. The struggle against colonial rule left a lasting impression on the native Maldivians and was a formative moment in the realization of a Maldivan identity. The liberation of the Maldives is still celebrated as the national day of the country.

In the mid-seventeenth century, the Dutch would govern the Maldives from their colony of Dutch Ceylon. However, their form of rule was indirect; they did not involve themselves in the local affairs of the Sultanate.

=== British protection and dissolution ===
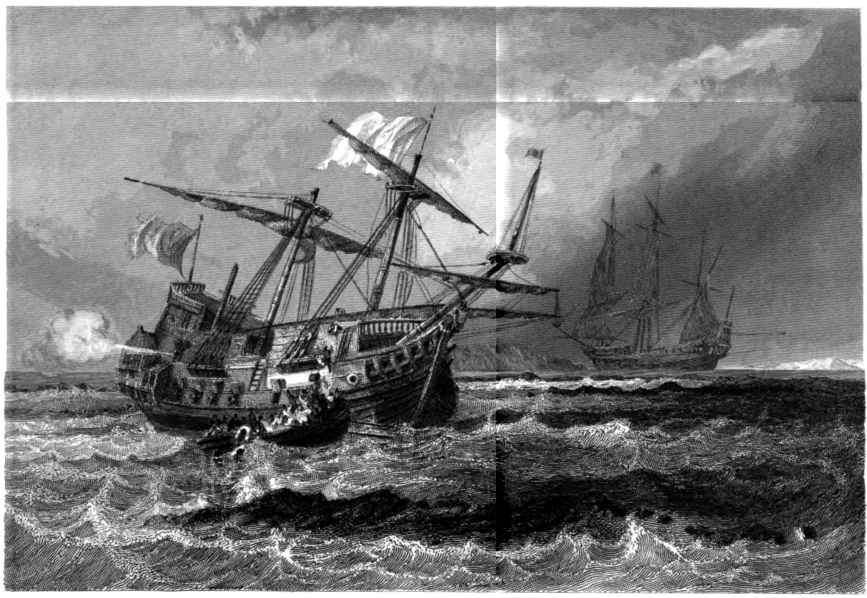
The wreck of the Corbin, 1865

In 1796, the British Empire expelled the Dutch from Ceylon and included the Maldives as a British protected area. The status of the Maldivan sultanate as a British protectorate was confirmed in an 1887 agreement. Like the Dutch, the British left the local customs of the Maldivians alone, allowing independent internal administration of the islands. However, the British era was one in which the power and influence of the Sultan was progressively weakened; thus, the British encouraged the establishment of a constitutional monarchy.

In 1932, the first constitution of the Maldives was put into effect. It limited the absolute powers of the Sultan, created the People's Majlis, and made a number of reforms; however, fears that this constitution favored British officials rather than the Maldivian people resulted in the constitution being torn up by an angry mob. A second constitution was resultantly published in 1937, and a third constitution was created in 1953. This document dissolved the Sultanate, replacing it with a presidential republic under Mohamed Amin Didi.

This system proved unpopular, however, and Amin Didi was ousted and later killed by a mob. A referendum resulted in the restoration of the Sultanate in 1954.

In 1959, the three Southern atolls of the Maldives (Addu Atoll, Huvadhu Atoll, and Fuvahmulah) declared independence from the Sultanate of the Maldives and established the United Suvadive Republic. These atolls seceded over the issues of the centralization of power in Malé, restrictions on travel and trade, and the presence of the British military. The republic was reannexed into the Maldives in 1963.

In July 1965, the Maldives gained full independence from the United Kingdom. Three years later, a final referendum was held and resulted in the establishment of a presidential republic, putting an end to the 815-year-old sultanate.

=== Independence ===
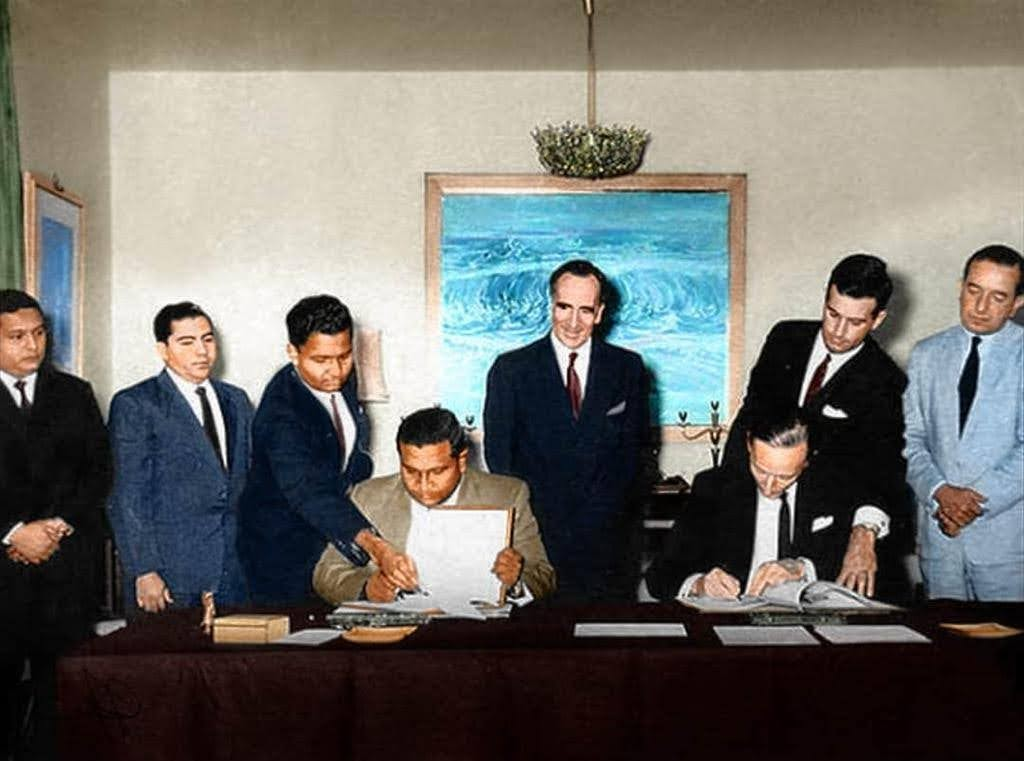
Prime Minister Ibrahim Nasir signs the independence agreement with the British.

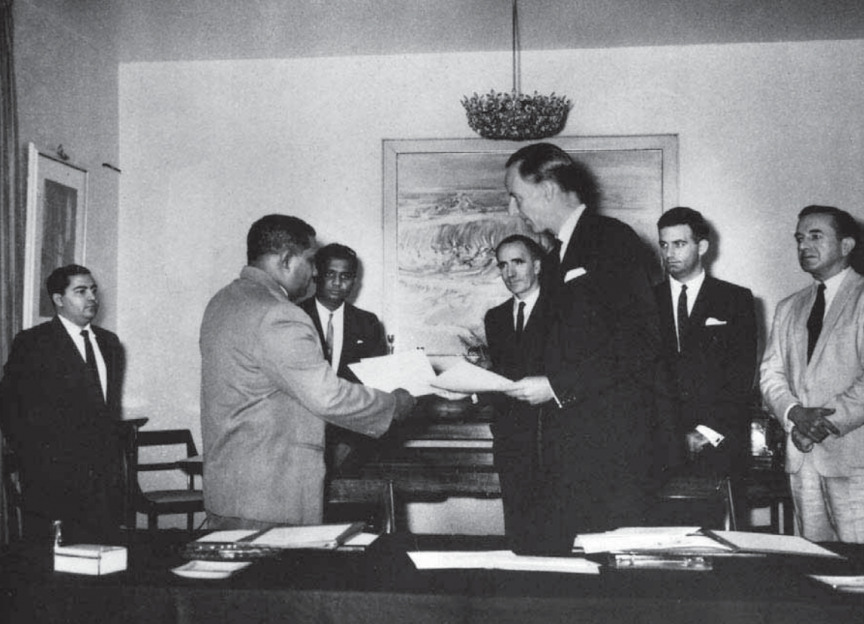
Prime Minister Ibrahim Nasir signs the independence agreement with the British at Westminster House, Colombo, Ceylon.

On 26 July 1965, the Maldives achieved independence through an agreement signed with the United Kingdom. The agreement was reached following discussions between the Maldives' representative in the Dominion of Ceylon (now Sri Lanka), Abdul Sattar Moosa Didi, and Sir Humphrey Arthington-Davy, the British representative.

Amidst the tumult of World War II, the British Empire strategically established RAF Gan, a Royal Air Force station, on Gan Island in the Addu Atoll. The island, now known as Gan International Airport, served as a crucial military outpost during the war. The strategic significance of Gan Island lay in its location, providing a strategic vantage point in the Indian Ocean region. RAF Gan played a pivotal role as a refueling and maintenance station for Allied aircraft, facilitating crucial air operations and supply routes in the theater of war. The establishment of RAF Gan underscored the British Empire's efforts to bolster its military presence in key regions, ensuring the defense of its interests and allies amidst the global conflict. This military installation not only contributed to Allied efforts during the war but also left a lasting legacy in the development and infrastructure of the Maldives.

During the reign of Sultan Muhammad Fareed Didi, prime minister Ibrahim Faamudheyri Kilegefaan orchestrated a clandestine agreement with the British Empire, wherein Gan Island was leased to them for a duration of 100 years.

Ibrahim Nasir opposed Ibrahim Faamudheyri Kilegefaan's decision to lease Gan Island to the British for a century. However, due to health issues, Kilegefaan resigned as Prime Minister of the Maldives, paving the way for Nasir to assume the position. Nasir's ascent to power concerned the people of Addu Atoll, who felt marginalized by the government in Malé, which they perceived as authoritarian. Addu Atoll residents feared losing the benefits and opportunities provided by the British presence, known as the "ran zamaaan" or golden years. These included jobs and services that had been extended to the people of Addu Atoll. Consequently, there were aspirations among the Addu people to establish a new republic, independent from the central government, to safeguard their interests and autonomy.

On 1 January 1959, the United Suvadive Republic emerged, marking a significant rupture in the territorial integrity of the Maldives. This breakaway entity encompassed three atolls: Huvadhoo, Fuvahmulah, and Addu. The formation of the United Suvadive Republic represented a pivotal moment in Maldivian history, reflecting simmering tensions and grievances within these atolls regarding governance and autonomy. However, this period of separation was relatively short-lived, as the republic was dissolved in 1963, resulting in its reintegration with the Maldives. The decision to dissolve the United Suvadive Republic and reunite with the Maldives was likely influenced by a variety of factors, including political, economic, and strategic considerations. This event left a lasting imprint on the collective memory of the Maldives, serving as a reminder of the complexities and challenges inherent in maintaining national unity and cohesion amidst diverse regional interests and identities.

== Government ==
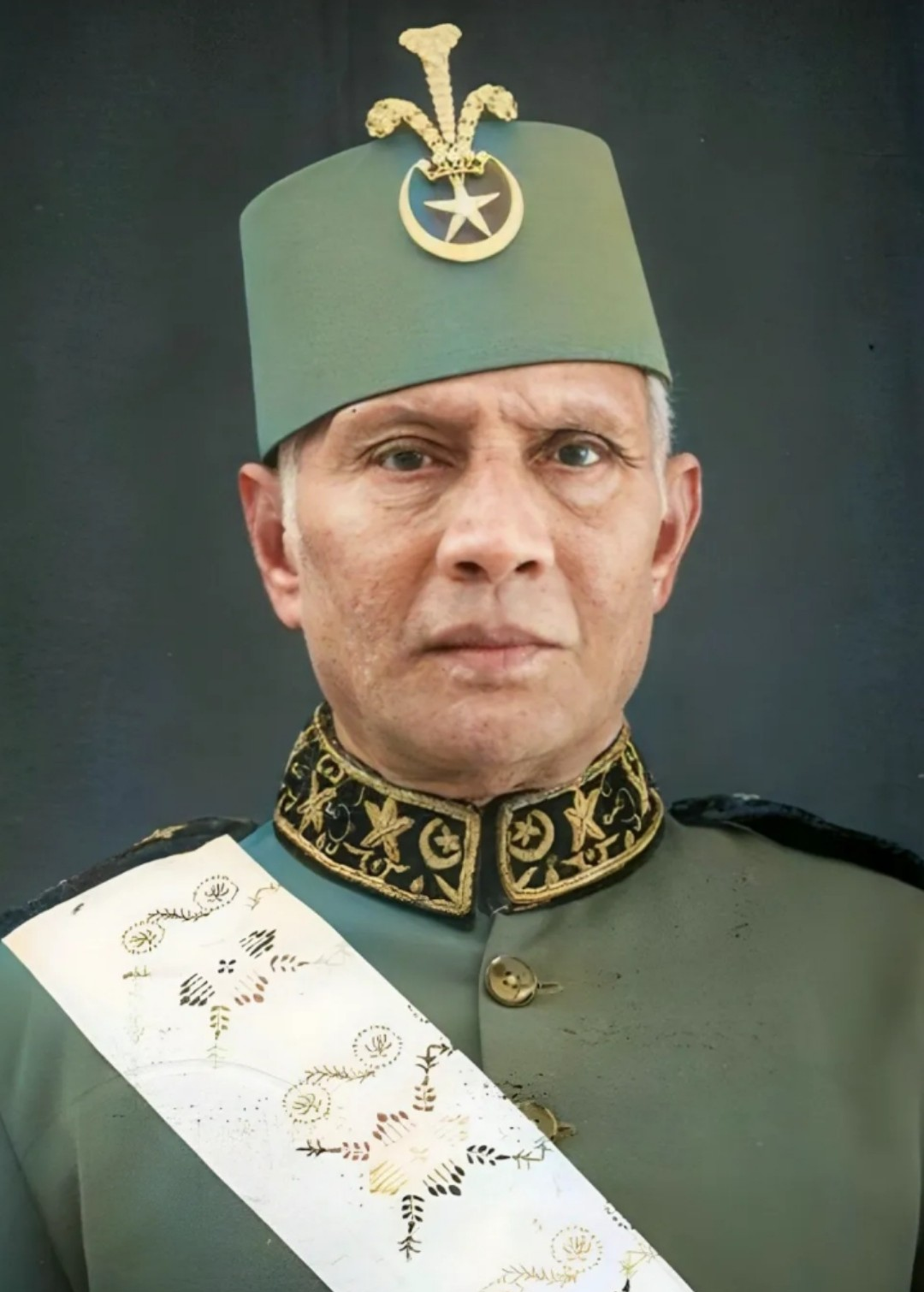
Last Sultan, Muhammad Fareed Didi

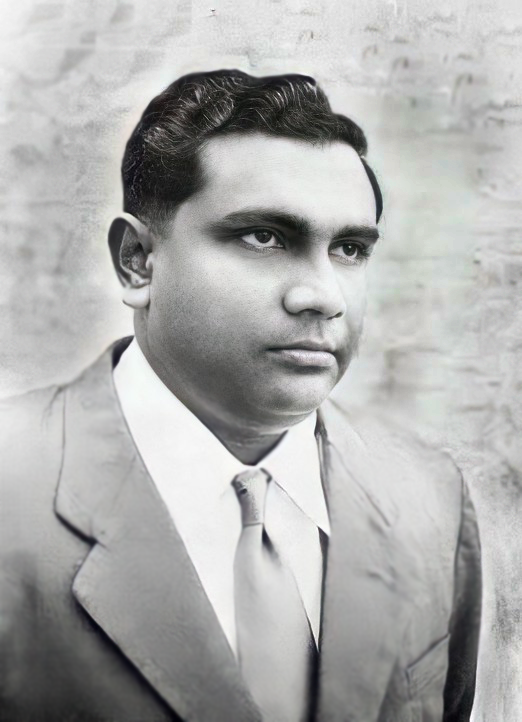
Last Prime Minister, Ibrahim Nasir

During the early 20th century, comprised a scattered archipelago of coral islands, each governed locally by appointed officials known as "atoll chiefs" or "atoll katibs." These officials acted as intermediaries between the central government and the island communities, overseeing administrative affairs and maintaining order. At the national level, the Sultan held supreme authority, with power centralized in his hands. The Sultan's court, based in Malé, the capital city, served as the hub of political decision-making and governance. Advisors and ministers, typically drawn from influential noble families, assisted the Sultan in governing the realm.

The legal system of the Maldive Islands during this period was based on Islamic law, with qadis (judges) presiding over legal matters and dispensing justice according to Sharia principles. Islamic jurisprudence heavily influenced various aspects of governance, including family law, criminal law, and commercial transactions.

Economically, the Maldive Islands relied primarily on fishing industry and maritime trade, with a network of dhoanis (traditional sailing vessels) facilitating commerce between the islands and neighboring regions. Agriculture, though limited due to the islands' small size and arid climate, also played a role in sustaining local communities.

Overall, the government of the nation in 1900s reflected a traditional monarchy deeply rooted in Islamic culture and customs, with power centralized in the hands of the Sultan and his appointed officials. This system endured until the mid-20th century when the Maldives underwent significant political reforms, eventually transitioning to a modern democratic republic.

=== Legislature and constitutional history ===
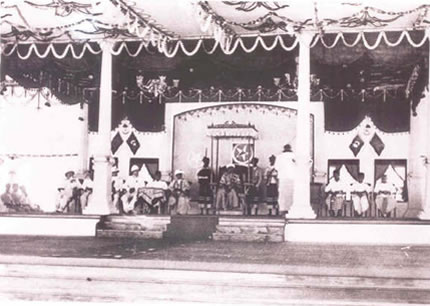
Constitution Day, 1932

A council was set up by Sultan Muhammad Shamsuddeen III to draft the constitution of the Maldives on 9 March 1931. The council completed and implemented the constitution on 22 December 1932. This constitution was the basis for the formation, of the first ever Majlis of the Maldives. The meetings of this Majlis were held in the "Hakura Ganduvaru". The first president or the speaker of the Majlis was Al Ameer Mohammed Farid Didi. Maldives was then ruled by a sultan and the advent of the new constitution was seen as a threat to the sultanate. Thus, mobs were instigated against the constitution and it was publicly torn up. Since then the constitution of the Maldives has been revised a number of times.

=== Atolls ===
In the 1900s, the sultanate's administrative divisions were organized under a centralized system of governance with power vested in the Sultan and his appointed officials. The country was divided into atolls, each governed by an Atoll Chief, who acted as the local administrator and representative of the Sultan. These Atoll Chiefs were responsible for overseeing the day-to-day affairs of their respective atolls, including law enforcement, dispute resolution, and tax collection. Underneath the Atoll Chiefs were Island Chiefs, who managed the individual islands within the atolls. They were tasked with maintaining order, collecting taxes, and implementing the Sultan's policies at the local level. The administrative structure was hierarchical, with authority flowing from the Sultan down to the Atoll Chiefs and Island Chiefs. This system remained largely unchanged throughout the monarchy, with administrative divisions serving to maintain centralized control and ensure the Sultan's authority was upheld across the archipelago.

== Demographics and culture ==
Year	Population
1911	72,237
1966	100,883

In the past, there was also a small Tamil population known as the Giraavaru people. This group has now been almost completely absorbed into the larger Maldivian society but were once native to the island of Giraavaru (Kaafu Atoll), The island was evacuated in 1968 due to heavy erosion of the island.

Some social stratification exists on the islands. It is not rigid, since rank is based on varied factors, including occupation, wealth, Islamic virtue, and family ties. Instead of a complex caste system, there was merely a distinction between noble (bēfulhu) and common people in the Maldives. Members of the social elite are concentrated in Malé.

In 1911, a significant milestone occurred in the history of the Maldive Islands with the inaugural census, marking the first-ever comprehensive attempt to quantify the population of the archipelago. This census, conducted in the early 20th century, provided valuable insights into the demographic composition of the Maldives at the time. The recorded population stood at 72,237 individuals, offering a snapshot of the inhabitants residing across the scattered coral islands of the Maldivian atolls.

=== Religion ===
Arab interest in the Maldives also was reflected in the residence there in the 1340s of Ibn Battuta. The renowned Moroccan traveler documented the tale of Abu Barakat Yusuf the Berber, hailing from North Morocco, who is believed to have played a pivotal role in spreading Islam in the Maldives. According to accounts, he purportedly persuaded the local king to embrace Islam after purportedly defeating Rannamaari, a sea monster. Even though this report has been contested in later sources, it does explain some crucial aspects of Maldivian culture. For instance, historically Arabic has been the prime language of administration there, instead of the Persian and Urdu languages used in the nearby Muslim states. Another link to North Africa was the Maliki school of jurisprudence, used throughout most of North Africa, which was the official one in the Maldives until the 17th century.

However, certain scholars have proposed the possibility that Ibn Battuta might have misinterpreted Maldivian texts, potentially influenced by a bias or preference for the North African Maghrebi/Berber narrative surrounding this Shaykh. This theory suggests that Ibn Battuta may have overlooked or downplayed the alternative account of East African origins, which was also known during that period.

=== Languages ===
The official and national language is Dhivehi, an Indo-Aryan language closely related to the Sinhala language of Sri Lanka. The first known script used to write Dhivehi is the eveyla akuru script, which is found in the historical recording of kings (raadhavalhi). Later a script called Dhives akuru was used for a long period. The present-day script is called Thaana and is written from right to left. Thaana is derived from a mix of the old indigenous script of Dhives akuru and Arabic abjad. Thaana is said to have been introduced by the reign of Mohamed Thakurufaanu.

The Dhivehi language is of Indo-Iranian Sanskritic origin and therefore closely related to Sinhala, which points at a later influence from the north of the subcontinent. According to legends, the kingly dynasty that ruled the Maldives in the past has its origin there.

These ancient kings may have brought Buddhism from the subcontinent, but it is not clear. In Sri Lanka, there are similar legends, but it is improbable that the ancient Maldives royals and Buddhism came both from that island, because none of the Sri Lankan chronicles mentions the Maldives. It is unlikely that the ancient chronicles of Sri Lanka would have failed to mention the Maldives, if a branch of its kingdom had extended itself to the Maldive Islands.

Since the 12th century AD, there have also been influences from Arabia in the language and culture of the Maldives, because of the general conversion to Islam at that time, and its location as a crossroads in the central Indian Ocean.

In the islands' culture, there are a few elements of African origin as well, from slaves brought to the court by the Royal family and nobles from their Hajj journeys to Arabia in the past. There are islands like Feridhu and Maalhos in Northern Ari Atoll, and Goidhu in Southern Maalhosmadulhu Atoll where many of the inhabitants trace their ancestry to released African slaves.

==== Dhives Akuru ====
Dhives Akuru script

Dhives Akuru developed from Brahmi. The oldest attested inscription bears a clear resemblance to South Indian epigraphical records of the sixth-eighth centuries, written in local subtypes of the Brahmi script. The letters on later inscriptions are clearly of the cursive type, strongly reminding of the medieval scripts used in Sri Lanka and South India such as Sinhala, Grantha and Vatteluttu. There are also some elements from the Kannada-Telugu scripts visible. The form of this script attested in loamaafaanu (copper plates) of the 12th and 13th centuries and in inscriptions on coral stone dating back to the Buddhist period (~200 BC to 12th century AD) was called by Bell Evēla Akuru (meaning "script of yore"^{:82-83; footnote 5} to distinguish it from the more recent form of the same script. The most recent form (starting from around the 14th century) was more calligraphic and the letter forms changed a little. Like other Brahmic scripts, Dhives Akuru descended ultimately from the Brahmi script and thus was written from left to right.

== See also ==
- Buddhism in the Maldives
- List of Maldivian monarchs
