= Hithadhoo =

Hithadhoo refer to:

- Hithadhoo (Addu), a district of Addu City, Maldives.
- Hithadhoo (Laamu Atoll), an inhabited island in the Maldives.

== See also ==
- Hithaadhoo (disambiguation)
