= 1968 Maldivian constitutional referendum =

Vote to abolish the Maldivian monarchy

- 15 March 1968

Results
Choice	Votes	%
Republic	36,997	81.23%
Monarchy	8,551	18.77%
Valid votes	45,548	99.47%
Invalid or blank votes	244	0.53%
Total votes	45,792	100.00%
Registered voters/turnout	49,056	93.35%

A constitutional referendum was held in the Maldives on 15 March 1968. The main question was whether to convert the state from a constitutional monarchy under Sultan Muhammad Fareed Didi to a presidential republic. The referendum was the third on the subject; the first in 1952 had seen the state convert to a presidential system, whilst a second in 1953 reversed the decision and saw the monarchy restored in 1954.

The proposals were approved by over 80% of voters, and a republic was declared on 11 November that year. Prime Minister Ibrahim Nasir would become president.

== Results ==
Choice	Votes	%
Republic	36,997	81.23
Monarchy	8,551	18.77
Total	45,548	100.00
Valid votes	45,548	99.47
Invalid/blank votes	244	0.53
Total votes	45,792	100.00
Registered voters/turnout	49,056	93.35
Source: Utheemu
