= Gaumee Salaam =

National anthem of the Maldives

English: National Salute
- ޤައުމީ ސަލާމް
- National anthem of Maldives
- Lyrics: Mohamed Jameel Didi, 1948
- Music: Pandit W. D. Amaradeva, 1972
- Adopted: 1905
- Readopted: 1972
- Preceded by: Salaamathi

Audio sample
- U.S. Navy Band instrumental rendition in C major: file; help

"Gaumee Salaam" (Dhivehi: ޤައުމީ ސަލާމް, IPA: [gaʊmiː s̺alaːm]; lit. 'National Salute') is the national anthem of the Maldives. The lyrics were written by Mohamed Jameel Didi in 1948, and the melody was composed by Sri Lankan maestro Pandit Amaradeva in 1972.

"Gaumee Salaam" declares national unity and Islam, and pays tribute to historic military victories and military deaths for the country. It also wishes further development on the country while paying respect to national leaders.

== History ==
Until 1948, a melody without lyrics called the Salaamathi was performed by a royal band on state occasions at the Etherekoilu, the residence of the Sultan. Soon after, it was decided that the Salaamathi needed lyrics accompanied by a new melody. The lyrics were written by a young poet and later chief justice, Mohamed Jameel Didi.

Jameel Didi wrote the words for the new Salaamathi bearing in mind the influence of Urdu poetry during the time, closely imitating its style and also furnishing his work with words borrowed from Arabic. Afterwards, Jameel Didi began looking for a tune to accompany his poem when he heard the noon chime ("Auld Lang Syne") of his uncle's clock. The tune was adopted to the lyrics, and the new Salaamathi was complete.

Throughout the 1950s and 1960s, Maldivians became more aware of the importance of a national anthem, and in 1972, shortly before the Maldives was visited by Queen Elizabeth II, the government hastily commissioned Sri Lankan maestro W. D. Amaradeva for a new melody for the anthem. The original lyrics were retained, with a few changes to emphasise the fact that Maldives had been a republic since 1968. As of 2022, this version of the anthem has survived without any modifications.

== Lyrics ==
Normally, only the chorus and first two verses are sung.

Maldivian original

Thaana

ކޯރަސް
ޤައުމީ މިއެކުވެރިކަން މަތީ ތިބެގެން ކުރީމެ ސަލާމް
ޤައުމީ ބަހުން ގިނަ ހެޔޮ ދުޢާ ކުރަމުން ކުރީމެ ސަލާމް

ޤައުމީ ނިޝާނަށް ޙުރުމަތާއެކު ބޯލަނބާ ތިބެގެން
އައުދާނަކަން ލިބިގެން އެވާ ދިދައަށް ކުރީމެ ސަލާމް

ކޯރަސް

ނަސްރާ ނަސީބާ ކާމިޔާބުގެ ރަމްޒަކަށް ހިމެނޭ
ފެއްސާއި ރަތާއި ހުދާ އެކީ ފެނުމުން ކުރީމެ ސަލާމް

ކޯރަސް

ފަޚުރާ ޝަރަފު ޤައުމަށް އެހޯދައިދެއްވި ބަޠަލުންނަށް
ޒިކުރާގެ މަތިވެރި ޅެންތަކުން އަދުގައި ކުރީމެ ސަލާމް

ކޯރަސް

ދިވެހީންގެ އެންމެން ކުރިއަރައި ސިލްމާ ސަލާމަތުގާ
ދިވެހީންގެ ނަން މޮޅުވުން އަދައި ތިބެގެން ކުރީމެ ސަލާމް

ކޯރަސް

މިނިވަންކަމާ މަދަނިއްޔަތާ ލިބިގެން މި ޢާލަމުގާ
ދިނިގެން ހިތާމަތަކުން ތިބުން އެދިގެން ކުރީމެ ސަލާމް

ކޯރަސް

ދީނާއި ވެރިންނަށް ހެޔޮހިތުން ހުރުމަތް އަދާކުރަމުން
ސީދާ ވަފާތެރިކަންމަތީ ތިބެގެން ކުރީމެ ސަލާމް

ކޯރަސް

ދައުލަތުގެ އަބުރާ ޢިއްޒަތާ މަތިވެރިވެގެން އަބަދަށް
އައުދާނަވުން އެދި ހެޔޮ ދުޢާ ކުރަމުން ކުރީމެ ސަލާމް

ކޯރަސް

Latin script

Koaras:
Gaumee mi ekuverikan mathee thibegen kureeme salaam,
Gaumee bahun gina heyo dhuaa kuramun kureeme salaam.

Gaumee nishaanah hurumathaaeku boalam'baa thibegen,
Audhaanakan libigen evaa dhidha-ah kureeme salaam.

Koaras

Nasraa naseebaa kaamiyaabuge ramzakah himeney,
Fessaai rathaai hudhaa ekee fenumun kureeme salaam.

Koaras

Fakhuraa sharafu gaumah ehoadhaidhevvi bathalunnah,
Zikuraage mathiveri lhentakun adhugai kureeme salaam.

Koaras

Dhiveheenge emmen kuriarai silmaa salaamathugaa,
Dhiveheenge nan molhu vun adhai thibegen kureeme salaam.

Koaras

Minivankamaa madhaniyyataa libigen mi aalamugaa,
Dhinigen hithaamathakun thibun edhigen kureeme salaam.

Koaras

Dheenaai verinnah heyo hithun hurumaiy adhaa kuramun,
Seedhaa vafaatherikanmathee thibegen kureeme salaam.

Koaras

Dhaulathuge aburaa izzataa mathiveri vegen abadah,
Audhaanavun edhi heyo dhuaa kuramun kureeme salaam.

Koaras

IPA transcription (Note: See Help:IPA and Maldivian phonology.)

[koː.ɾas̺]
[gaʊ.miː mi‿e.kʊ.we.ɾɪ.kam‿ma.t̪iː t̪ɪ.be.geŋ kʊ.ɾiː.me s̺a.laːm |]
[gaʊ.miː ba.hʊŋ gɪ.na he.jo d̪ʊ.ʕaː kʊ.ɾa.mʊŋ kʊ.ɾiː.me s̺a.laːm ‖]

[gaʊ.miː nɪ.ʃaː.naŋ ħʊ.ɾʊ.ma.t̪aː‿e.ku boː.la.ᵐbaː t̪ɪ.be.geŋ |]
[ʔaʊ.d̪aː.na.kaŋ lɪ.bɪ.geŋ e.ʋaː d̪ɪ.d̪a.(j)ak‿kʊ.ɾiː.me s̺a.laːm ‖]

[koː.ɾas̺]

[nas̺.ɾaː na.s̺iː.baː kaː.mɪ.jaː.bʊ.ge ɾam.za.kaŋ hɪ.me.neː |]
[fes̺.s̺aː.i ɾa.taː.i hʊ.d̪aː‿e.kiː fe.nʊ.mʊŋ kʊ.ɾiː.me s̺a.laːm ‖]

[koː.ɾas̺]

[fa.xʊ.ɾaː ʃa.ɾa.fu gaʊ.maŋ e.hoː.d̪aɪ d̪eʋ.ʋi ba.tˤa.lʊn.n̪aʔ |]
[z̺ɪ.kʊ.ɾaː.ge ma.t̪ɪ.ʋe.ɾi ɭen̪.t̪a.kʊŋ a.d̪ʊ.gaɪ kʊ.ɾiː.me s̺a.laːm ‖]

[koː.ɾas̺]

[d̪ɪ.ʋe.hiːŋ.ge ʔem.meŋ kʊ.ɾi‿a.ɾaɪ s̺ɪl.maː s̺a.laː.ma.t̪ʊ.gaː |]
[d̪ɪ.ʋe.hiːŋ.ge nam‿mo.ɭʊ.wʊŋ a.d̪aɪ t̪ɪ.be.geŋ kʊ.ɾiː.me s̺a.laːm ‖]

[koː.ɾas̺]

[mɪ.nɪ.ʋaŋ.ka.maː ma.d̪a.nɪj.ja.t̪aː lɪ.bɪ.geŋ mi ʕaː.la.mʊ.gaː |]
[d̪ɪ.nɪ.geŋ hɪ.t̪aː.ma.t̪a.kʊn̪ t̪ɪ.bʊŋ e.d̪ɪ.geŋ kʊ.ɾiː.me s̺a.laːm ‖]

[koː.ɾas̺]

[d̪iː.naː.i ʋe.ɾi(ː)n.naŋ he.jo.hɪ.t̪ʊŋ hʊ.ɾʊ.mæːŋ a.d̪aː kʊ.ɾa.mʊŋ |]
[s̺iː.d̪aː ʋa.faː.t̪e.ɾɪ.kam‿ma.t̪iː t̪ɪ.be.geŋ kʊ.ɾiː.me s̺a.laːm ‖]

[koː.ɾas̺]

[d̪aʊ.la.t̪ʊ.ge ʔa.bʊ.ɾaː ʕɪz̺.z̺a.t̪aː ma.t̪ɪ.ʋe.ɾɪ ʋe.geŋ a.ba.d̪aʔ |]
[ʔaʊ.d̪aː.na ʋʊŋ e.d̪i he.jo d̪ʊ.ʕaː kʊ.ɾa.muŋ kʊ.ɾiː.me s̺a.laːm ‖]

[koː.ɾas̺]

English translation

Chorus:
We salute thee, O Motherland, in unity
In our own tongue with good wishes aplenty.

We bow our heads to thy crescent moon and star,
Our buoyant flag we hail, with bright colours streaming in air.

Chorus

Of victory and of good fortune are its symbols
We salute the mighty red, white and green.

Chorus

To heroes who sought honour and pride for the nation
We salute today in auspicious verses of recollection.

Chorus

May there be fame and good wealth for Maldivian land
And may the name of fellow Maldivians become grand.

Chorus

We wish for their freedom and progress in this world
And for their freedom from sorrows, and we thus salute.

Chorus

With full respect and heartfelt blessing towards religion and our leaders,
We salute thee in uprightness and in truth.

Chorus

May the State always have auspicious honour and respect.
We salute thee, with good wishes for thy continuing might.

Chorus
