= 1952 Maldivian constitutional referendum =

Vote to abolish the Maldivian sultanate

A constitutional referendum was held in the Maldives on 17 and 18 April 1952. The new constitution would convert the country from a monarchy to a republic.

== Background ==
After the death of Sultan Abdul Majeed Didi on 21 February 1952, the members of the country's parliament chose Mohamed Amin Didi to be the next Sultan. However, he stated that "for the sake of the people of Maldives I would not accept the crown and the throne".

The People's Majlis voted on 13 April to form a commission with Amin Didi as its chairman to determine the country's future governance structure. Other members included Famuladeyri Kaleygefan, Chief Justice Abdullah Jalaludeen, Majlis Speaker Malim Moosa Mafaiy Kilegefan, Deputy Vazirul-Auzam Ibrahim Mohamed Didi, Kolhumadulu Atoll MP Ibrahim Shihab, Galolhu MP Bucha Hassan Kaleygefan and Faadhippolhu Atoll chief Kaannaa Kaleygefan. On 16 April, the People's Majlis affirmed the commission's decision to form a republic, and to hold a referendum on a new constitution over the following two days. However, the referendum would only be held in Malé.

== Results ==
The results of the referendum were announced at 16:00 on 18 April. A large majority had voted in favour, and the new constitution came into force on 1 January 1953. Didi became the country's first President after winning almost 96% of the vote in an election. However, he was overthrown on 21 August that year. Following a referendum in the same month, the country reverted to monarchy status on 7 March 1954, with Muhammad Fareed Didi as sultan.

In 1968 a third referendum on the issue was held, resulting in the country becoming a republic for the second time.
