= Hassan Zareer =

Vice President of the Maldives from 1976 to 1977

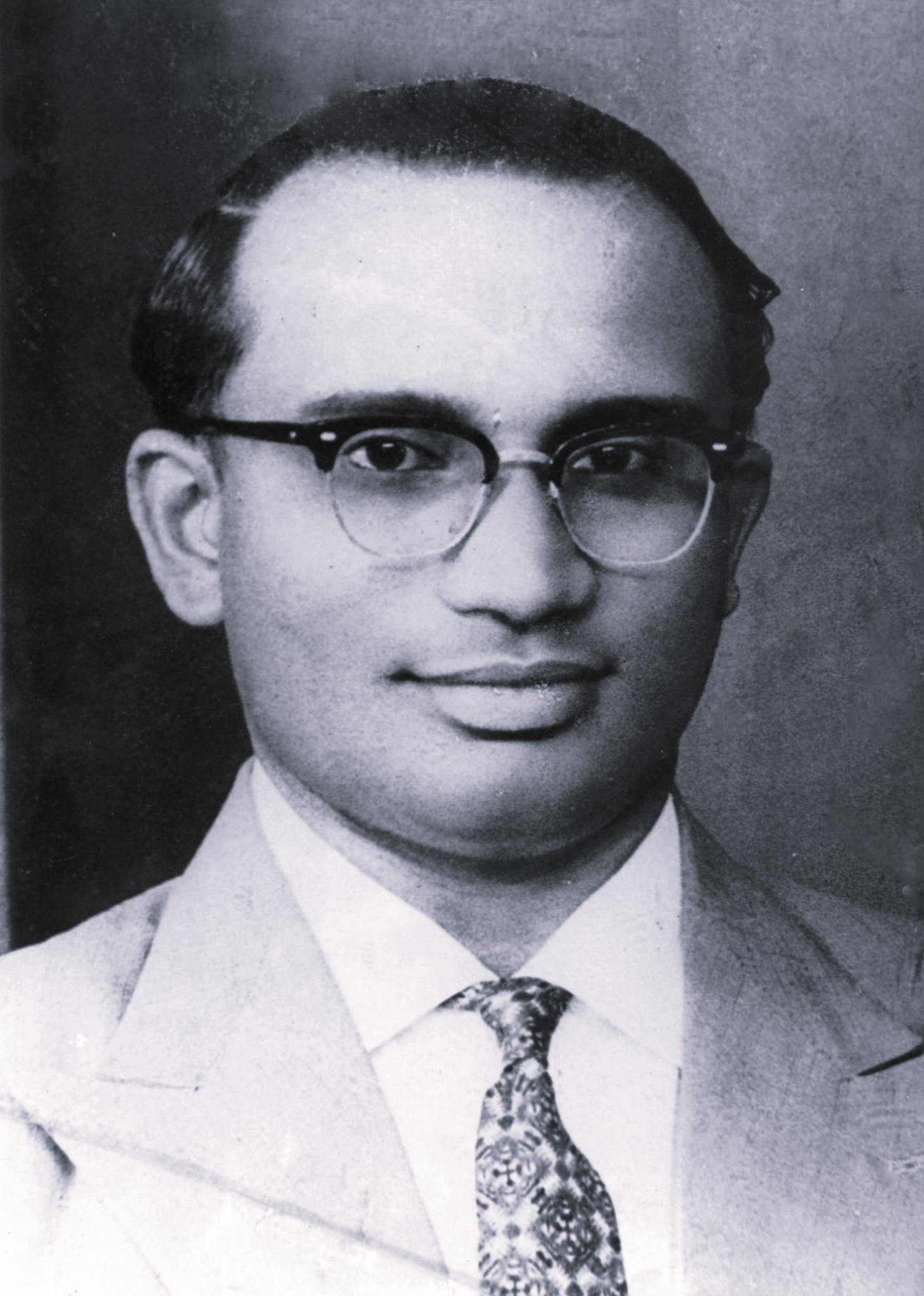

Vice President of the Maldives
- Tenure: 7 June 1976 – 6 January 1977
- Predecessor: None
- President: Ibrahim Nasir
- Successor: Office abolished
- Born: 1935; Fura Malé, Maldive Islands
- Died: 18 August 2001 (aged 65–66); Malé, Maldives
- Spouse: Fathimath Jameel, Eggamuge Jameelaa Ibrahim Didi
- Issue: 4, including Zahiya
- House: Huraa
- Father: Moonimaage Seedhi
- Mother: Princess Medhu Gomafulhu

Al Nabeel Hassan Zareer (1935–18 August 2001) was a Maldivian politician and engineer who served as the vice president of the Maldives from June 1976 to January 1977. He was also a member of the royal family of the Maldives, as the grandson of Muhammad Shamsuddeen III.

Zareer was Vice President of the Maldives in the administration of former President Ibrahim Nasir. He was one of the 5 Vice Presidents from 7 June 1976 to 6 January 1977.

In addition to the post of Vice President, Zareer served as a member of the parliament. He also held the posts of Minister of Education, Minister of Transport, Minister of Trade, and Minister of Provincial Affairs.

Zareer was married to Fathimath Jameel, and had four children, including Zahiya Zareer.
