= Durdans Hospital =

Hospital in Sri Lanka

Ceylon Hospitals PLC
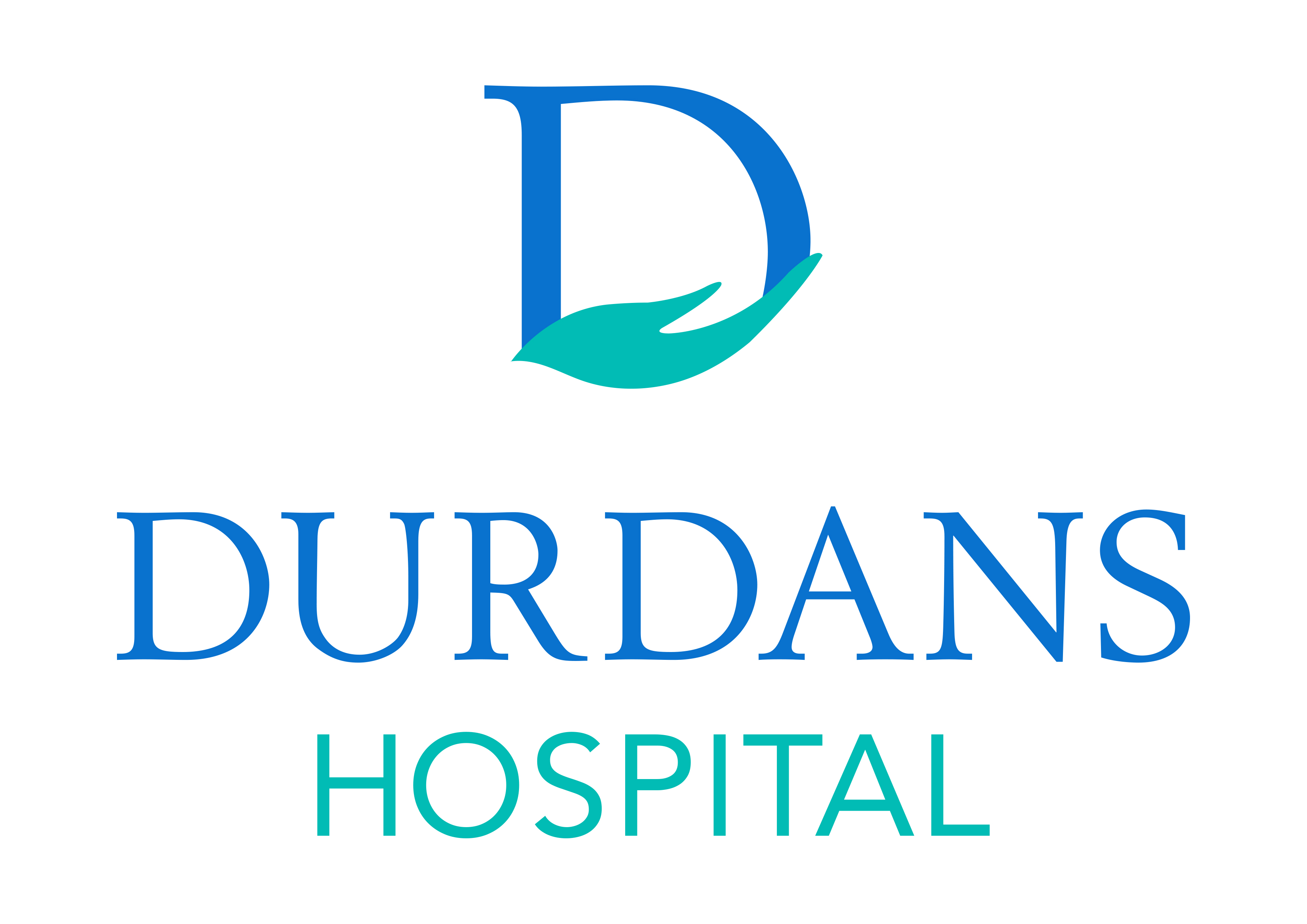
- Logo of Durdans Hospital
- Trade name: Durdans Hospital
- Native name: ඩර්ඩන්ස් රෝහල
- Type: Public
- Traded as: CSE: CHL.N0000
- ISIN: LK0338N00000
- Industry: Healthcare
- Founded: 1945; 81 years ago
- Headquarters: Colombo, Sri Lanka
- Number of locations: 115 (2022)
- Key people: Ajith Tudawe (Chairman); Upul Tudawe (Vice President); Aminda Tudawe (Executive Director); Anoja Edirisinghe (Director - Growth & Strategy and Founding Initiator of AMRAK); Mahanil Perera (COO )
- Products: Hospitals, Pharmacy, Diagnostic Centre, Multi-specialty tertiary care
- Revenue: ▲LKR7,840 million (2022)
- Operating income: ▲LKR1,389 million (2022)
- Net income: ▲LKR1,109 million (2022)
- Total assets: ▲LKR12,803 million (2022)
- Number of employees: ▼1,973 (2022)
- Parent: Durdans Management Services Ltd
- Website: www.durdans.com

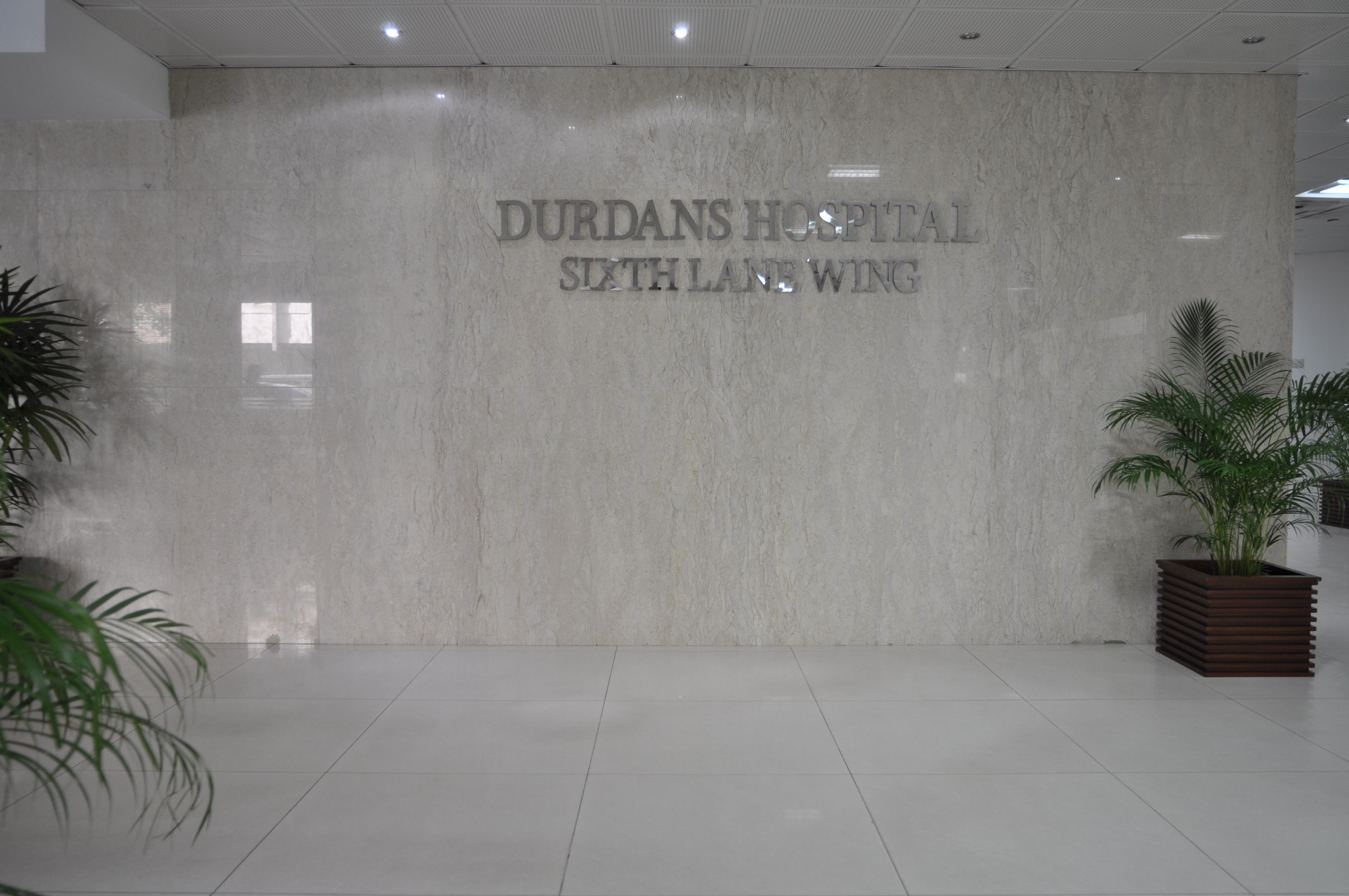
Sixth Lane wing

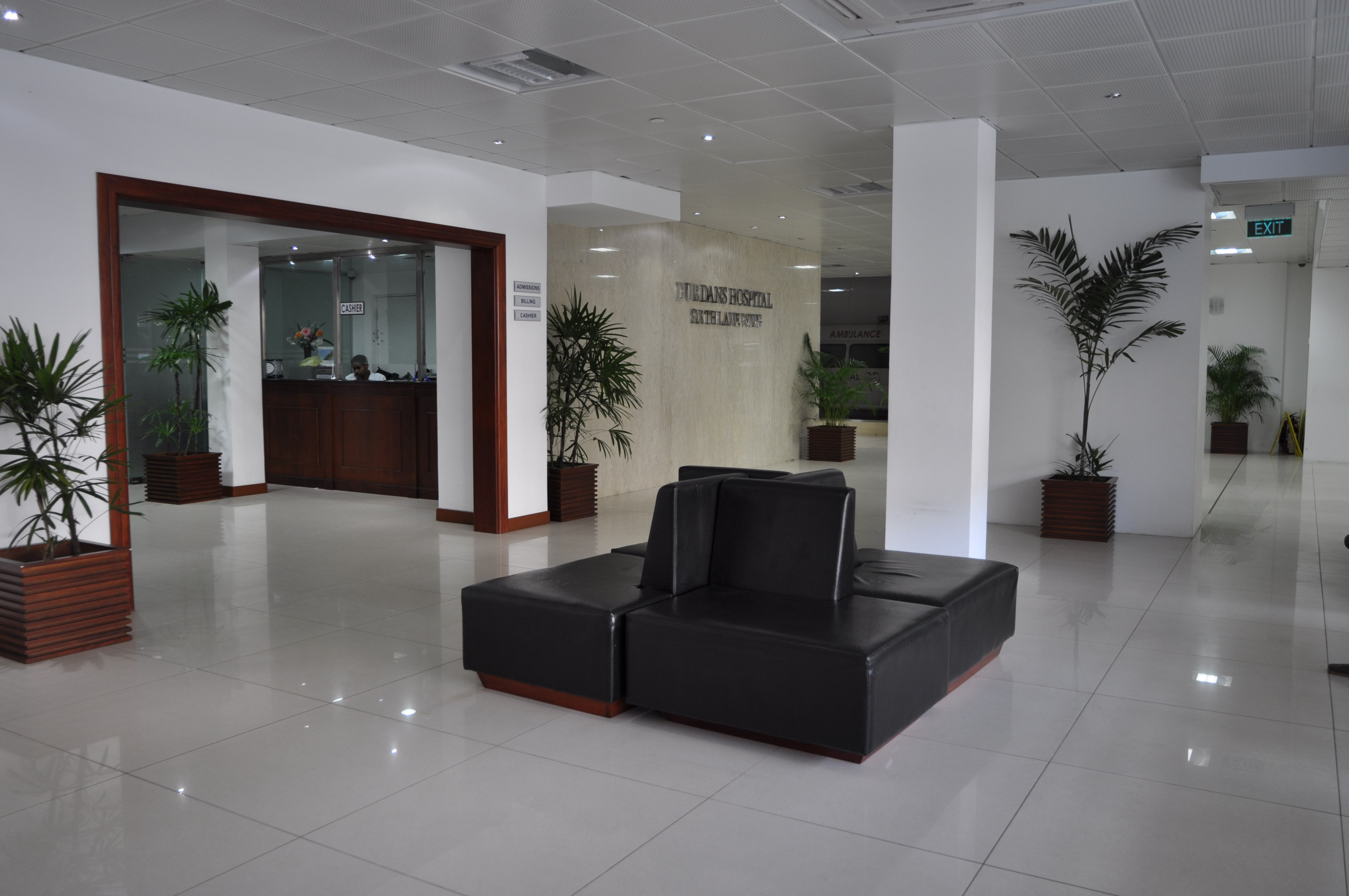
Patient lobby area

Durdans Hospital is a multi-speciality private hospital that treats patients visiting from around the world, in Colombo, Sri Lanka, founded in 1945, and currently owned and operated by Ceylon Hospitals PLC.

== History ==
=== Early years ===
Durdans Hospital was established in 1939. Originally the stately home of Charles Peiris, the brother of Sir James Peiris, it became the primary military hospital in British Ceylon. Its primary purpose was to treat British personnel during World War II. In 1945, a group of doctors seeking a private enterprise gained ownership of the hospital to establish Ceylon Hospitals Limited, the predecessor of modern-day Durdans Hospital.

=== Timeline of Development ===
- 1968 - Durdans opened its first maternity care facility as well as an outpatient facility with a focus on maternity care.
- 1982 - Paediatric care and surgical procedures commenced followed by more specialties being offered.
- 1984 - Radiology Unit is opened to the public.
- 1993 - Intensive Care Unit is opened.
- 1995 - Setting up of the Endoscopy Unit.
- 1996 - Pathology Laboratory and Blood bank is opened.
- 1997 - Setting up of the Durdans Heart Centre
- 1999 - The Alfred Place wing expanded to add more rooms.
- 2003 - Ceylon Hospitals Limited listed on the Colombo Stock Exchange and company name changed to Ceylon Hospitals PLC.
- 2004 - A phased expansion program commenced to improve Alfred Place Wing.
- 2007 - The commencement of the construction of Sixth Lane Wing Hospital.
- 2011 - Sixth Lane Wing Hospital became fully operational.
- 2014 - Accredited by the Joint Commission International (JCI)(1st JCI Accredited Hospital in Sri Lanka) - Gold Seal of Approval.
- 2014 - Liaison office is opened in the Maldives.
- 2017 - Radiology Department updated with state of the art equipment and Laboratory operations re-accredited with ISO 15189:2012.
- 2017 - Relaunch of Durdans brand with slogan 'Dedicated to you'. Opening of brand-new multi-storied split level car park.
- 2017 - Ventured into Amrak Institute of Medical Sciences
- 2019 - Launch of most advanced biplane catheterisation laboratory in Sri Lanka enabling head-to-toe procedures.
- 2020 - Digitisation of medical services and introduction of audio/video consultations.
- 2022 - Vision 2022 Project to get the modern Durdans expansions
- 2023 - Durdans Coffee Table Book Launch -Journey of Care
- 2025 - Specialised Geriatric care unit is added.

== Locations ==
=== Durdans Hospital – Sri Lanka ===
Durdans Hospital is located in the heart of the commercial capital of Colombo.

=== Durdans Laboratory ===
The Durdans laboratory network is spread over 100 locations that includes mini laboratories, sample collection centers, and medical centers across Sri Lanka.

=== Durdans Hospital – Maldives ===
In October 2014, Durdans Hospital opened a liaison office in the Maldives.

== Durdans Heart Centre ==
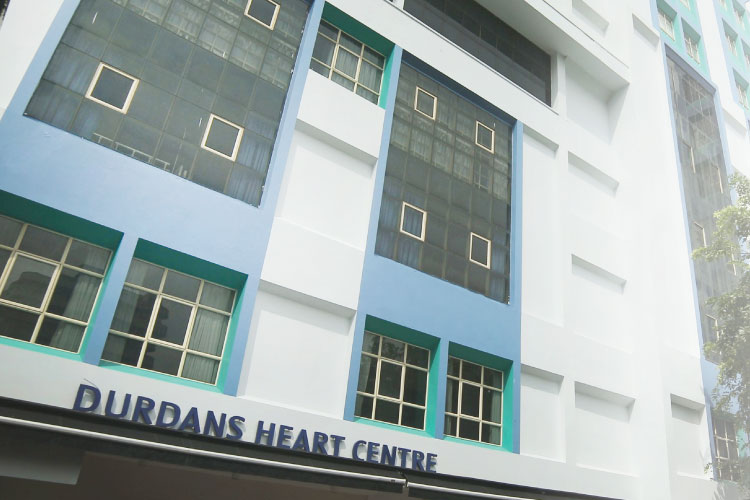
Durdans Heart Centre, front view

Durdans Hospital established its Durdans Heart Centre in 1999. It has become a centre in cardiology, cardiac surgery and cardiac investigative procedures.

Durdans Heart Centre was established as an affiliation to Fortis Escorts Heart Institute (formally known as Escorts Heart Institute & Research Centre). It specialises in prevention, detection, diagnosis, and treatment of heart disease.

== Medical Tourism ==
Durdans is part of the drive to build a 2015–20 National Masterplan Initiative on Medical Tourism. This would map out such factors as availability of hospital facilities, accreditation, specialisations, centre of excellence areas, post-surgery and wellness packages, medical tourism packages and tie-ups with global medical travel agents.

== Service Accessibility ==
The hospital has introduced audio and video consultation to expand its service through telemedicine for patients since 2020.

== Subsidiaries ==
Amrak Institute of Medical Sciences is a fully owned subsidiary of Durdans Hospital.
