= Aishath Mohamed Didi =

Maldivian diplomat and politician

- ޢާއިޝަތު މުޙައްމަދުދީދީ
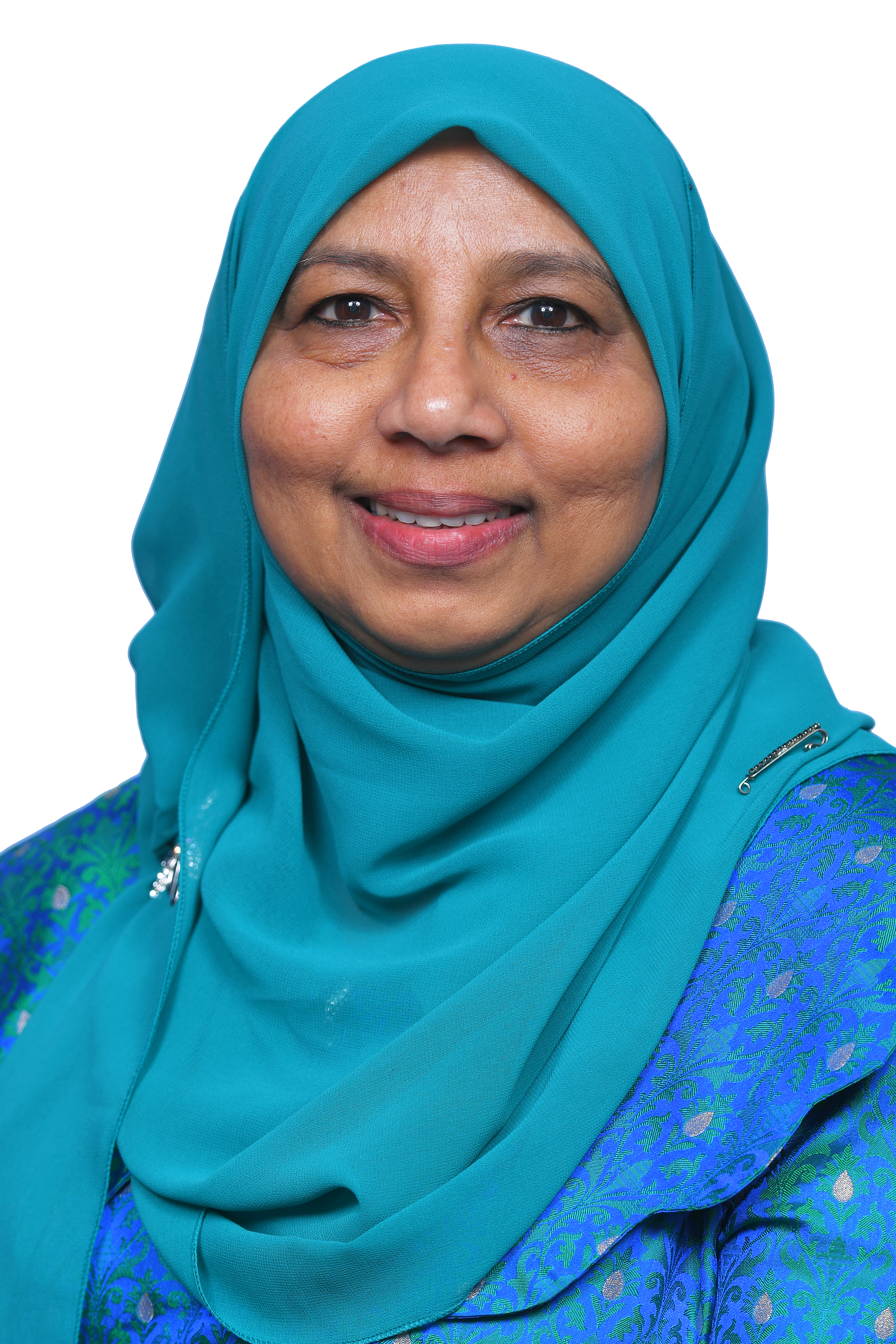
- Didi in 2020

Minister of Gender, Family and Social Services
- In office 9 February 2020 – 17 November 2023
- President: Ibrahim Mohamed Solih
- Preceded by: Shidhatha Shareef
- Succeeded by: Aishath Shiham

Ambassador of the Maldives to India
- In office 8 February 2019 – 9 February 2020
- President: Ibrahim Mohamed Solih
- Preceded by: Ahmed Mohamed
- Succeeded by: Ibrahim Shaheeb

Minister of Gender and Family
- In office July 2005 – November 2008
- President: Maumoon Abdul Gayoom
- Preceded by: Aneesa Ahmed
- Succeeded by: Aminath Jameel

Personal details
- Party: Maldivian Democratic Party (2023–present)
- Education: UCL Institute of Education (MA); American University of Beirut (BA)

Aishath Mohamed Didi (Dhivehi: ޢާއިޝަތު މުޙައްމަދުދީދީ) is a Maldivian diplomat and politician who served as the Minister of Gender, Family and Social Services of the Maldives from 2019 to 2023. She previously served as the Ambassador of the Maldives to India from 2018 to 2019.

== Education ==
Didi has a Master of Arts from the UCL Institute of Education and a Bachelor of Arts and a Diploma in teaching from the American University of Beirut.

Didi has a bachelor's and master's degree in arts and a diploma in teaching.

== Career ==
Didi previously served as the Minister of Gender and Family from 2005 to 2008 during the presidency of Maumoon Abdul Gayoom. She was also a member of the UN task force on gender, UN task force on youth and adolescents, and Society for Health Education. She was also the chairperson of the Gender Equality Council, board of Children's Home Governing, and Council for the Rights of Children. Didi was described as an advocator for social issues and was known for her volunteer work to defend the rights of women and children, and advocating for education.

In December 2018, President Ibrahim Mohamed Solih proposed Didi as the Ambassador of the Maldives to India, later being appointed. She presented her letter of credence to Indian president Ram Nath Kovind on 8 February 2019. In 2020, President Solih nominated and appointed Didi as the Minister of Gender, Family and Social Services to replace Shidhatha Shareef. The Government Oversight Committee of the People's Majlis (parliament) reviewed the appointment and the Majlis approved it.

In 2023, Didi joined the Maldivian Democratic Party.
