= 1953 Maldivian constitutional referendum =

Vote to restore the Maldivian sultanate

A constitutional referendum was held in the Maldives in August 1953. The proposed amendments would result in the country becoming a sultanate again. This would reverse the outcome of a referendum the previous year, which resulted in the country becoming a republic. The 1953 referendum was held after the new republican government was overthrown after just a few months. The proposals were approved by voters, and Muhammad Fareed Didi was proclaimed as Sultan on 6 March 1954.
