= List of diplomatic missions of the Maldives =

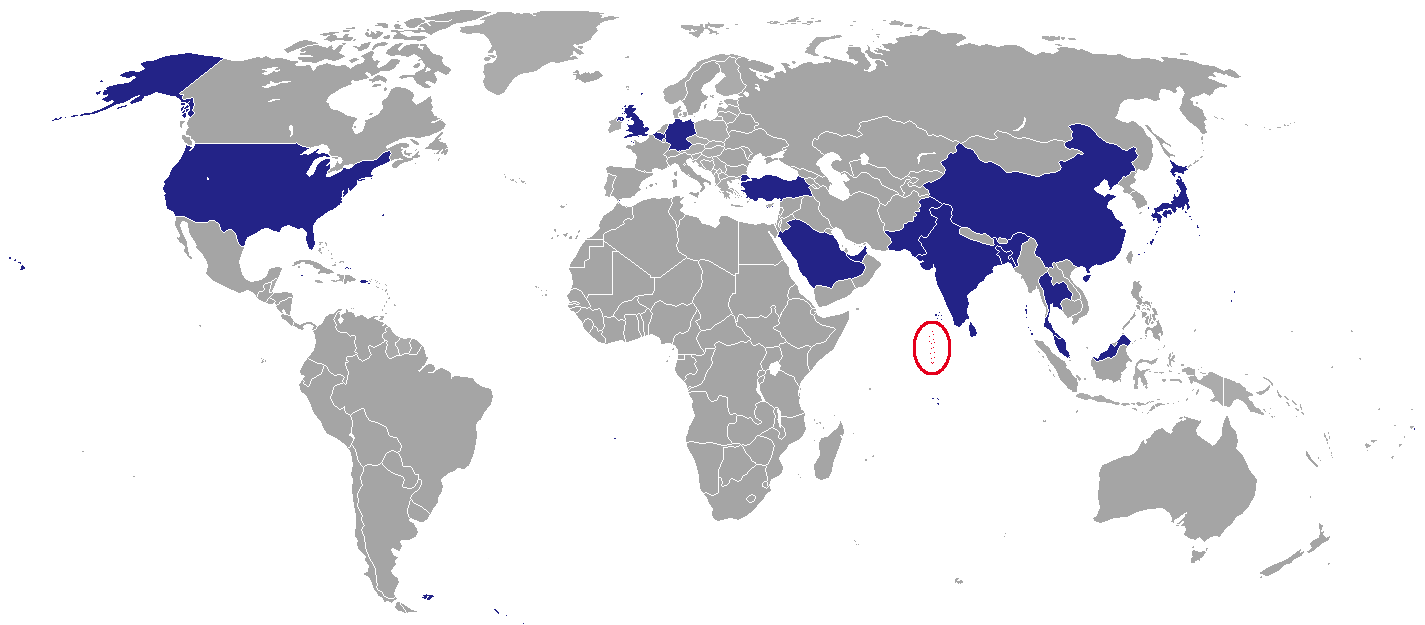
Diplomatic missions of the Maldives

The Republic of Maldives has twenty one diplomatic missions in twenty countries from different regions.

Since Maldives is a member of the Commonwealth of Nations, it has high commissioners as the head of the missions to other Commonwealth countries. After the Maldives was on the brink of suspension from the Commonwealth by the Commonwealth Ministerial Action Group due to human rights abuses, the country withdrew from the Commonwealth in October 2016. The missions were also renamed along with the title of the mission heads. In 2020, the Maldives rejoined the Commonwealth and the names of the missions were reverted.

The first diplomatic mission of the Maldives was the High Commission in Colombo which was opened in July 1965 as the "Maldives Representative Office in Colombo". The latest diplomatic mission was the Maldivian Embassy in Qatar which was established in June 2025.

== Missions to individual countries ==
Country	Region	City	Mission	Opened	Concurrent accreditation	Ref(s)
Bangladesh	Asia	Dhaka	High Commission	2008	Countries: Bhutan	
Belgium	Europe	Brussels	Embassy	2010	Countries: Luxembourg; Netherlands; Ukraine; International organizations: European Union	
China	Asia	Beijing	Embassy	2007		
Germany	Europe	Berlin	Embassy	2016	Countries: Denmark; Finland; Serbia; Sweden	
India	Asia	New Delhi	High Commission	1982		
India	Asia	Thiruvananthapuram	Consulate-General	2019 (Note: Established initially as a consulate in 2005, and was elevated into a consulate-general in 2019.)		
Japan	Asia	Tokyo	Embassy	2007	Countries: South Korea	
Malaysia	Asia	Kuala Lumpur	High Commission	2006	Countries: Philippines	
Pakistan	Asia	Islamabad	High Commission	2008		
Qatar	Asia	Doha	Embassy	2026		
Saudi Arabia	Asia	Riyadh	Embassy	2008	Countries: Egypt; Kuwait; Morocco; Oman; South Sudan; International Organizations: Organisation of Islamic Cooperation	
Saudi Arabia	Asia	Jeddah	Consulate	2019	Countries: Egypt; Kuwait; Morocco; Oman; South Sudan; International Organizations: Organisation of Islamic Cooperation	
Singapore	Asia	Singapore	High Commission	2007	Countries: Australia; New Zealand	
Sri Lanka	Asia	Colombo	High Commission	1965	Countries: Mauritius	
Thailand	Asia	Bangkok	Embassy	2018	Countries: Cambodia	
Turkey	Asia	Ankara	Embassy	2024	Countries: Azerbaijan; Russia	
United Arab Emirates	Asia	Abu Dhabi	Embassy	2012	International Organizations: International Renewable Energy Agency	
United Kingdom	Europe	London	High Commission	1995	Countries: France; Ireland; Spain	
United States	Americas	Washington, D.C.	Embassy	2007	Countries: Canada	

== Missions to Multilateral organizations ==
Organization	Region	City	Mission	Opened	Concurrent accreditation	Ref(s)
United Nations	Europe	Geneva	Permanent Mission		Countries: Austria; Italy; Switzerland	
United Nations	Americas	New York City	Permanent Mission		Countries: Guatemala	

== Gallery ==
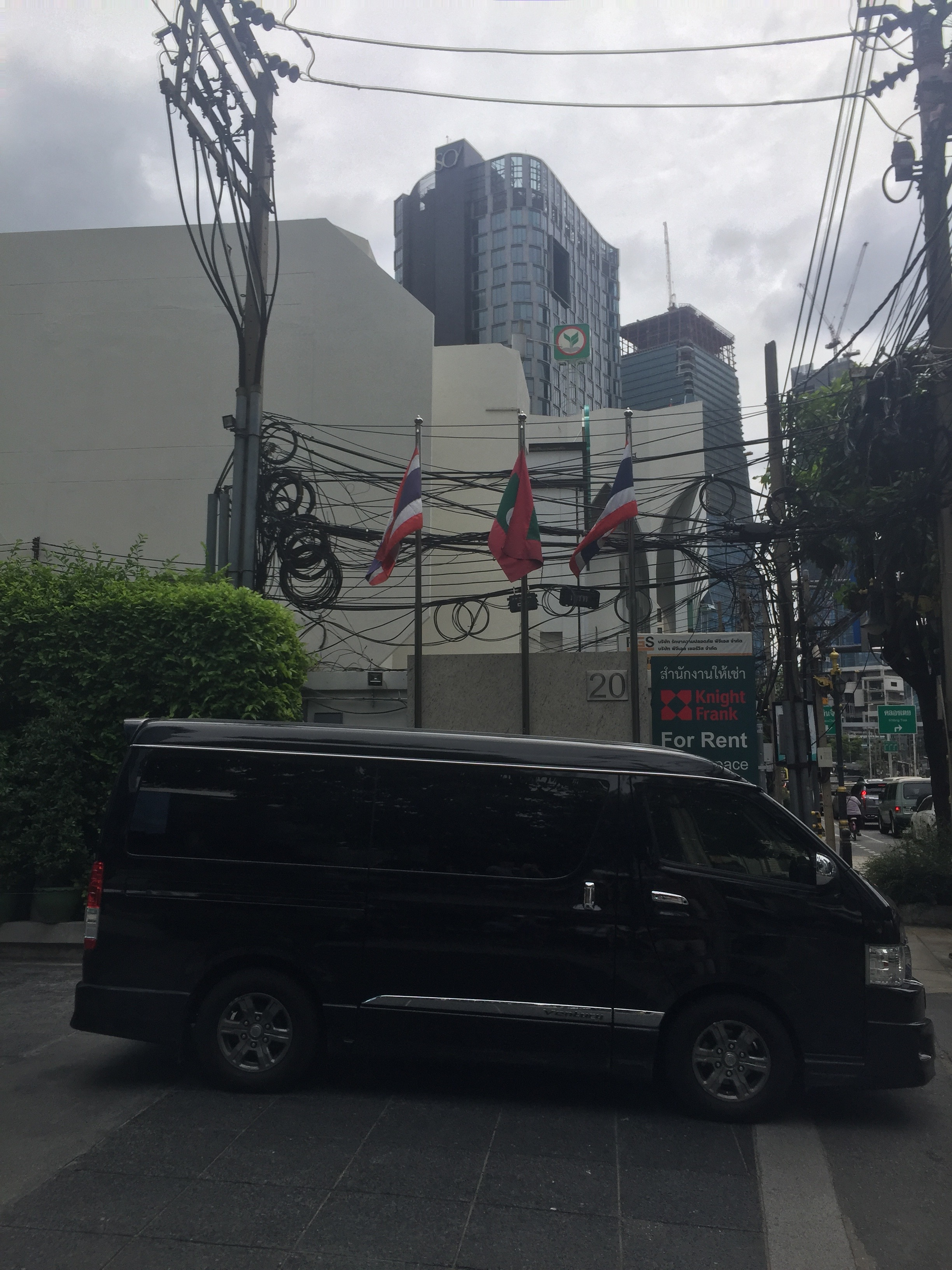
Embassy in Bangkok

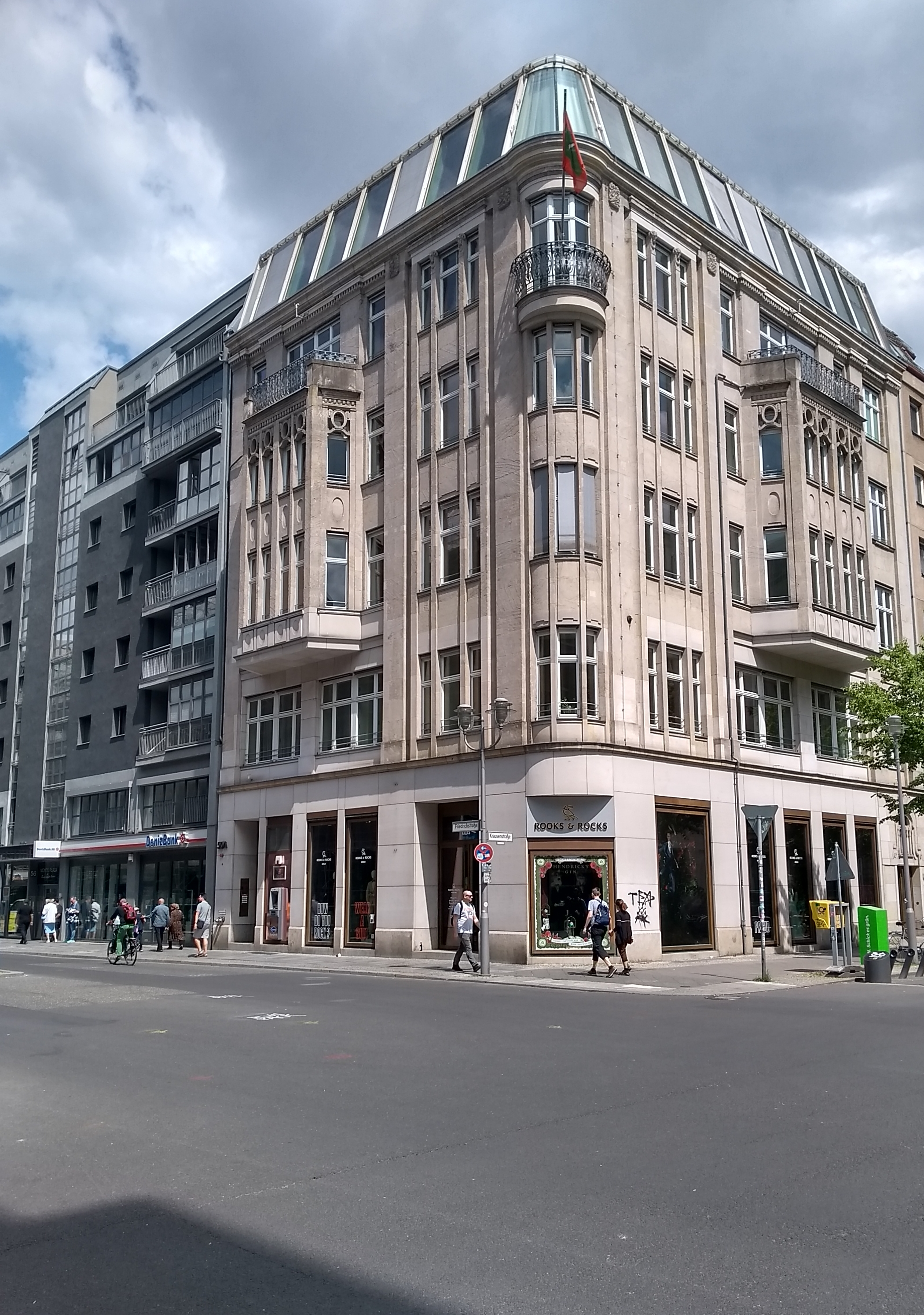
Embassy in Berlin

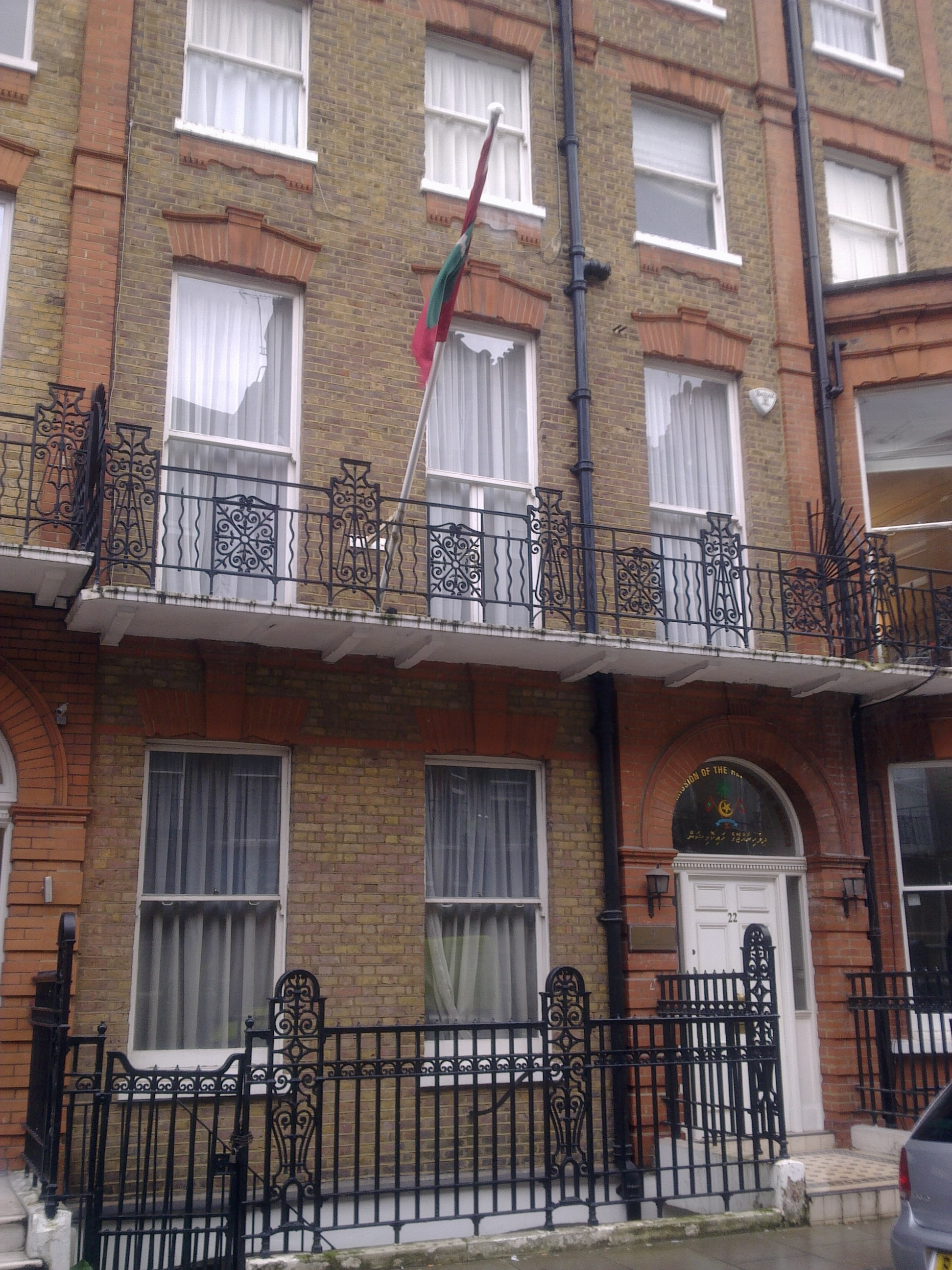
High Commission in London

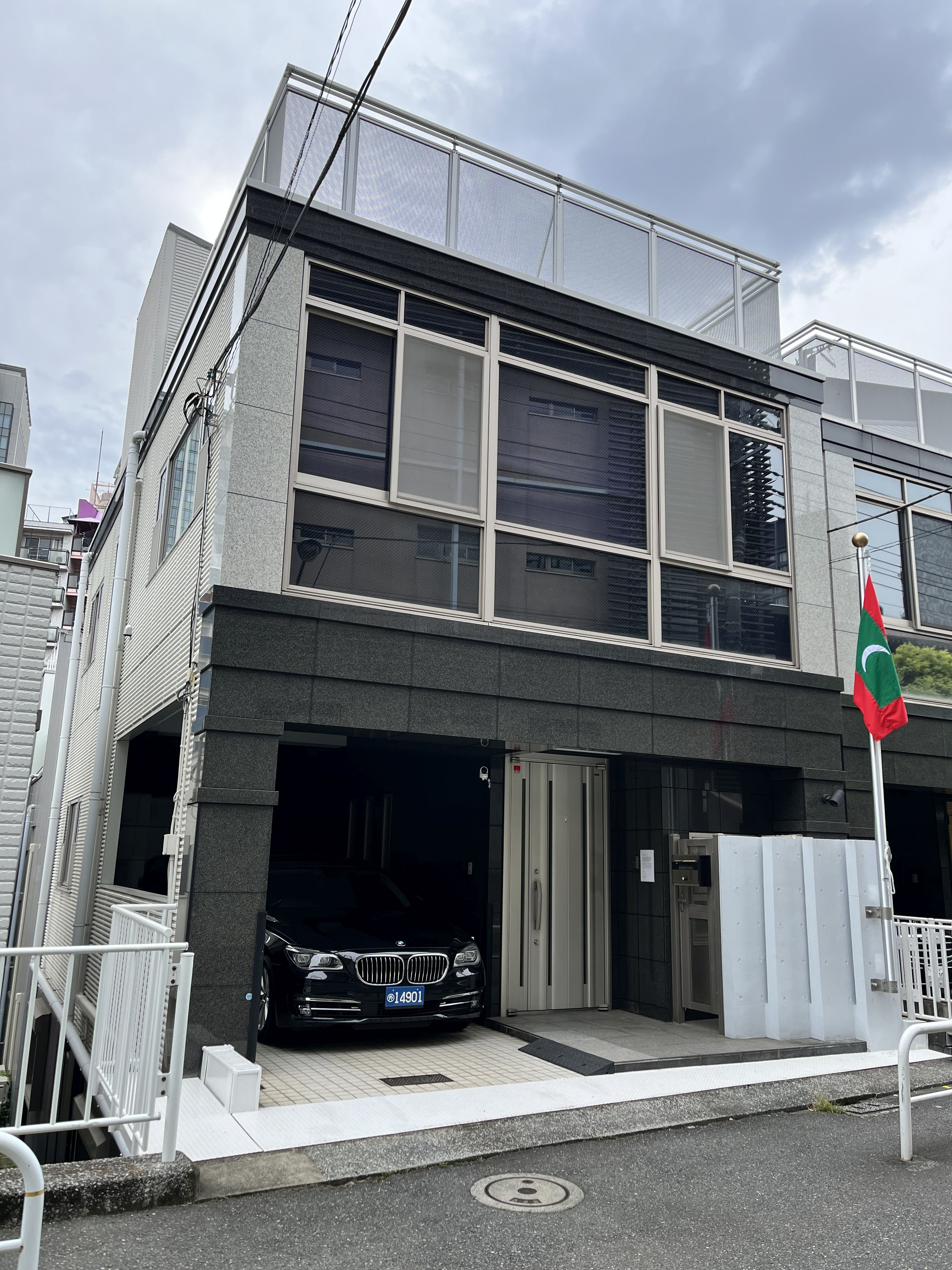
Embassy in Tokyo

== See also ==
- Foreign relations of the Maldives
- List of diplomatic missions in the Maldives
- Visa policy of the Maldives
