= Embassy of Palestine, Malé =

- Location: Malaysia
- Address: No. 13, Jalan Pegawai, Off Jalan U-Thant, 55000, Kuala Lumpur
- Ambassador: Walid A.M. Abu Ali

The Embassy of the State of Palestine in Maldives (Arabic: سفارة دولة فلسطين لدى جزر المالديف) is the diplomatic mission of the State of Palestine in Maldives. Currently, the Embassy is located in Kuala Lumpur, Malaysia.

== Ambassador ==
The current Ambassador of Palestine to the Maldives is Walid A.M. Abu Ali, he presented his Letter of credence to President Ibrahim Mohamed Solih.

== See also ==
- List of diplomatic missions of Palestine
- List of diplomatic missions in the Maldives
