= Kosovo–Maldives relations =

Kosovan–Maldivian relations
- Kosovo: Maldives

Kosovo–Maldives relations are the bilateral relations between Kosovo and the Maldives. Kosovo declared its independence from Serbia on 17 February 2008 and the Maldives recognised it on 19 February 2009. On 16 April 2009, Kosovo and the Maldives established diplomatic relations with one another.

== History ==
=== Maldivian support at the ICJ ===
The Maldives was absent at the 8 October 2008 United Nations General Assembly vote regarding an ICJ hearing on the legality of Kosovo's independence. On 21 April 2009, it was announced by the ICJ that the Maldives was one of the 36 UN member states to summit a written statement to the ICJ regarding the legality of Kosovo's unilaterally proclaimed independence. The Maldives written statement is in favour and supports the legality of Kosovo's independence from Serbia.

The ICJ ruled that Kosovo's declaration of independence was legal.

=== Bribery accusations ===
On 7 March 2009, the Maldivian President Mohamed Nasheed asked police to investigate the allegations of a US$2 million bribe given to Maldivian government officials to recognise Kosovo as an independent state. On 17 March, People's Majlis National Security Committee launched probe into Islamic Democratic Party's allegations regarding the bribery. Balkan Insight reported that Kosovo businessman, Behgjet Pacolli, who also heads the New Kosovo Alliance party, has denied any involvement in the bribery case and stated that he only lobbied for the recognition of Kosovo. Foreign Minister Ahmed Shaheed was cross-examined by the parliamentary committee on 28 March. The police investigation was closed on 6 May 2009, concluding that there was no evidence of corruption and the diplomatic process was conducted according to international standards; the NSC investigation was suspended.

=== De-recognition claim ===
In January 2023, Serbian president Aleksandar Vučić claimed that the Maldives, had withdrawn recognition of Kosovo.

In May 2023 the spokesperson for the president of the Maldives refuted Serbian claims that the Maldives had de-recognised Kosovo, explicitly labelling Serbia's claims as "false". The Maldivian government sent greetings to the president of Kosovo on the occasion of Kosovo's independence day on 17 February in 2024 and again in 2025, confirming the continuation of diplomatic recognition.

== See also ==
- Foreign relations of Kosovo
- Foreign relations of the Maldives
