= Islamic Democratic Party =

Islamic Democratic Party may refer to:

- Islamic Democratic Party (Maldives)
- Islamic Democratic Party (Rwanda)

== See also ==
- List of Islamic democratic political parties
