= Embassy of the Maldives, Berlin =

Diplomatic mission of the Maldives in Berlin, Germany

Embassy of the Maldives, Berlin ޖަރުމަނު ވިލާތުގައި ހުންނަ ދިވެހިރާއްޖޭގެ އެމްބަސީ Maledivische Botschaft in Deutschland
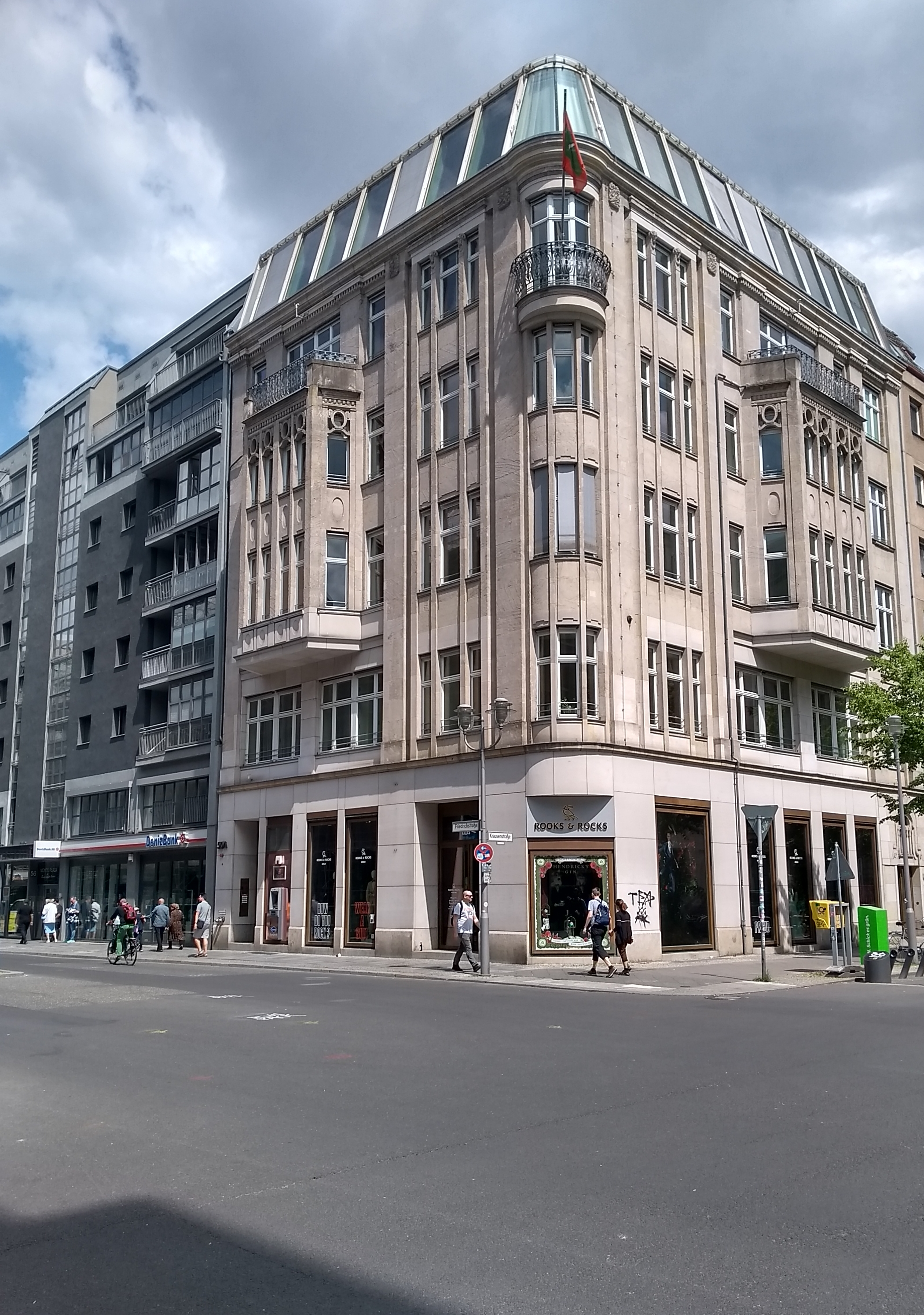
- Location: Germany
- Address: Friedrichstraße 55A 10117 Berlin
- Opened: 28 September 2016
- Ambassador: Aishath Shaan Shakir
- Website: www.maldivesembassy.de

The Embassy of the Maldives, Berlin (Dhivehi: ޖަރުމަނު ވިލާތުގައި ހުންނަ ދިވެހިރާއްޖޭގެ އެމްބަސީ, German: Maledivische Botschaft in Deutschland, also known as the Embassy of the Maldives in Germany) is an embassy established by the Maldives in Berlin, the capital of Germany.

== History ==
Diplomatic relations were established between the Federal Republic of Germany (then West Germany and now unified Germany) and the Maldives on 5 July 1966, and between the German Democratic Republic (East Germany) and the Maldives on 22 May 1970.

On 14 March 2011, the first Ambassador Irtisham Adam presented his credentials to German President Wulff for the first time.

On 28 September 2016, the Maldives' embassy was opened in Berlin by Mohamed Asim, Minister of Foreign Affairs.

On 9 March 2017, Ambassador Jameela Ali Khalid, the first permanent resident of Berlin, presented her credentials to President Joachim Gauck.

== Address ==
Friedrichstrasse 55A 10117 Berlin

== Ambassador ==
Since 20 July 2022, Aishath Shaan Shakir has been serving as Ambassador Extraordinary and Plenipotentiary.

== Related ==
- Embassy Website
- Embassy of the Maldives, Berlin on Twitter
