= Germany–Maldives relations =

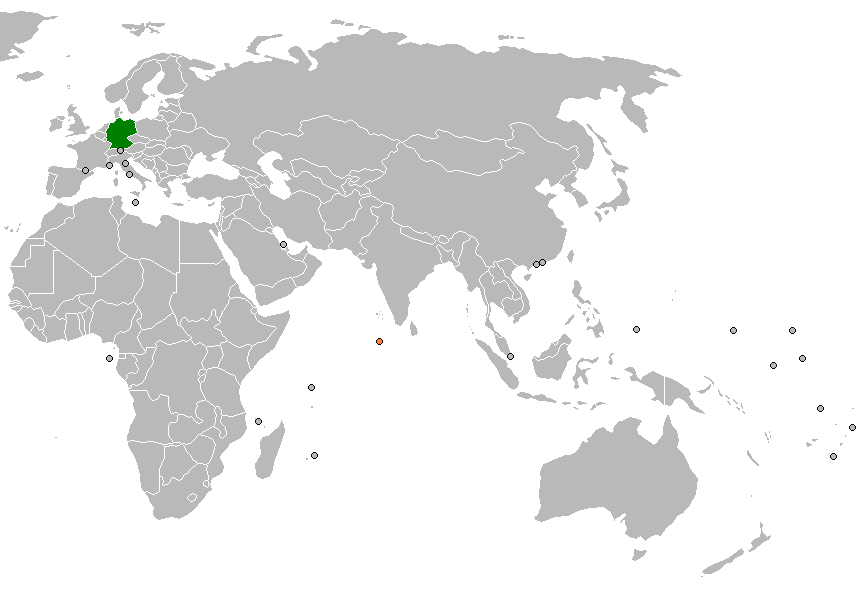

- Germany: Maldives

Germany–Maldives relations have existed since the 1960s and both countries cooperate closely on climate policy. The Maldives has an embassy in Berlin. Germany does not have a resident ambassador.

== History ==
The Maldives and the Federal Republic of Germany established diplomatic relations in 1966. Germany has supported the Maldives in its democratization and in 2010 Maldivian President Mohamed Nasheed traveled and met with German Chancellor Angela Merkel. In 2012, the country was admitted to the German-South Asian Parliamentary Group of the German Bundestag and was visited by a Bundestag delegation in the same year. The Maldives has been represented by its own embassy in Berlin since 2016. Jameela Ali Khalid served as the first resident Ambassador of the Maldives to Germany from 2017 to 2019.

During Ibrahim Mohamed Solih's term in office, relations between the two countries have intensified and the two countries have been working closely together, particularly on international climate policy.

== Economic relations ==
The bilateral exchange of goods amounted to 56 million Euro in 2021. Tourism is of particular economic importance. From January to October, nearly 100,000 German tourists visited the Maldives, accounting for 8% of all tourists in the country.
