= Foreign relations of the Maldives =

The Maldives has remained an independent nation throughout its recorded history, save for a brief spell of Portuguese occupation in the mid-16th century. From 1900 to 1965, the country was a British protectorate while retaining full internal sovereignty. At its independence in 1965, the Maldives joined the United Nations on 20 September.

Since 1978, the Maldives has followed a policy of international engagement, intensifying links with strategic partners and the international system. It joined the Commonwealth of Nations in 1982. A founder member of South Asian Association for Regional Cooperation (SAARC), the Maldives is also a member of the Bretton Woods system. It is also party to the Nuclear Non-Proliferation Treaty (NPT) as well as numerous conventions on the protection of the environment, the suppression of terrorism, disarmament and on the promotion and protection of human rights.

In its transition towards a liberal democracy, the Maldives has established dialogue and collaboration with international human rights organizations, such as Amnesty International and Human Rights Watch, and acceded to numerous human rights instruments such as the International Covenant on Civil and Political Rights (ICCPR) and the International Covenant on Economic, Social and Cultural Rights (ICESCR). During the same period, the country has also intensified links with the Commonwealth Parliamentary Association (CPA) and joined the Inter-Parliamentary Union (IPU).

The Maldives retains diplomatic relations with 172 countries, with resident diplomatic missions in Abu Dhabi, Ankara, Beijing, Berlin, Brussels, Colombo, D.C., Dhaka, Geneva, Islamabad, Kuala Lumpur, London, New Delhi, New York, Riyadh, Singapore and Tokyo and non-resident accreditation in numerous other countries, including Bhutan and Nepal.

The country’s issues of interest include advancing national development, supporting international peace and security, including the protection of the environment and the promotion of human rights, and upholding the purposes and principles enshrined in the Charter of the United Nations.

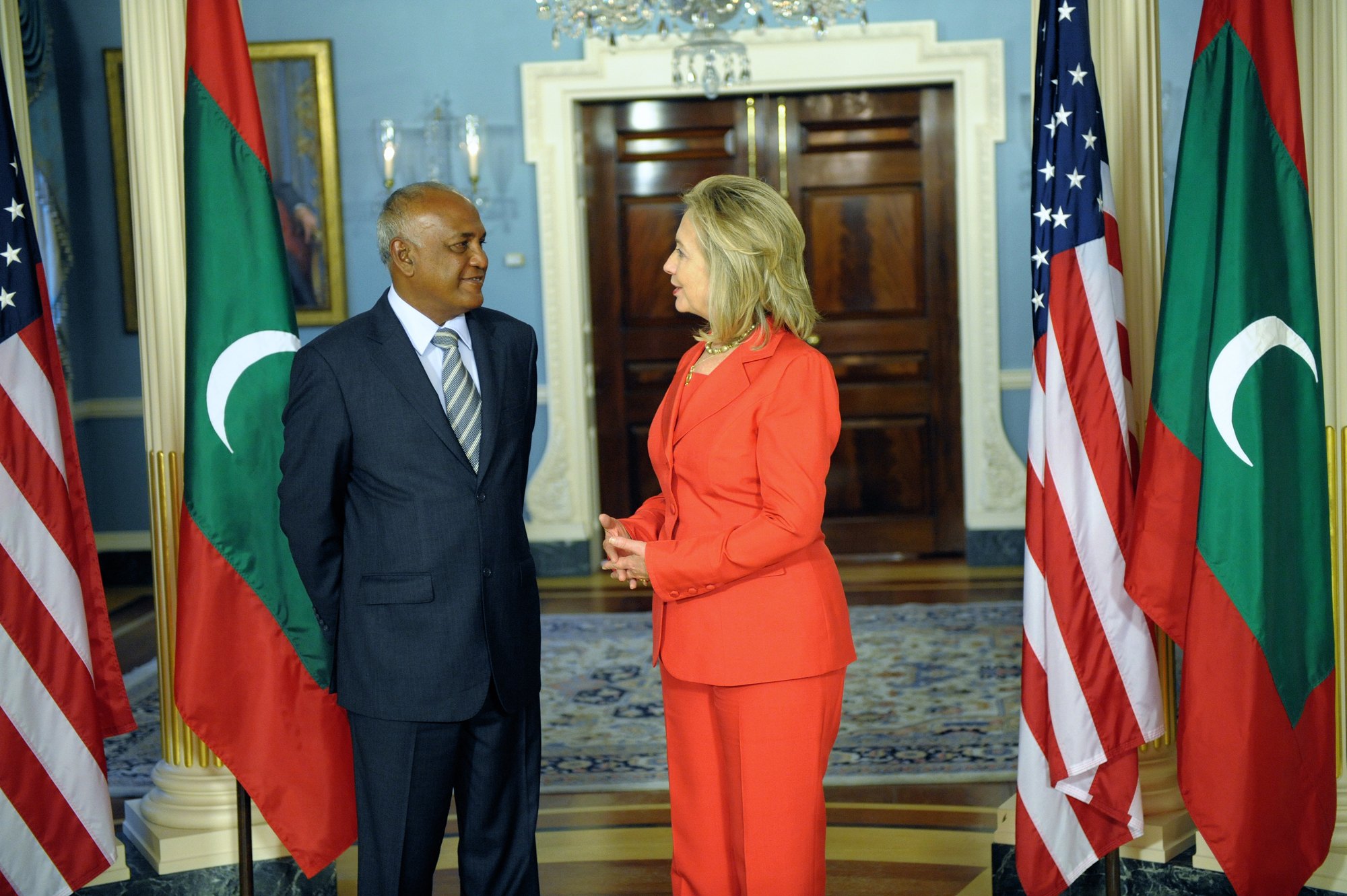
Former US Secretary of State Hillary Clinton receives Former Foreign Minister Ahmed Naseem, July 2011

== Human rights ==
The Maldives has become a very strong advocate for the promotion and protection of human rights following the democratic transition in 2008. At the United Nations, the Maldives has since then called for all countries to adhere to their obligations under international law, and to respect fundamental freedoms and rights. In 2005, the Maldives became one of the promoters of the Optional Protocol to the UN Convention Against Torture after having earlier acceded to the convention. The Maldives is party to the Convention on the Rights of the Child (CRC), the Convention on the Elimination of Racial Discrimination (CERD), Convention on the Rights of Persons with Disabilities (CRPD) the Convention on the Elimination of All Forms of Discrimination Against Women (CEDAW) and its optional protocol. In April 2006, the Maldives issued a standing invitation to all special procedures mandates of the UN human rights machinery to visit to the Maldives.

The Maldives was elected to the Human Rights Council in 2010 for the term 2010–2013, in which it has actively supported and contributed to the promotion and protection of human rights for all. It has co-sponsored a number of resolution establishing United Nations Special Mandates, and supported resolutions on improving human rights situation in the Middle East during the Arab Spring, namely on investigating human rights violations in Libya and Syria.

Maldives has especially close relations with Sri Lanka and India, countries with which it shares much culture.

== International organizations ==
=== United Nations ===
Maldives became a member state of the United Nations on 21 September 1965. The nation became a member of United Nations Development Programme (UNDP) on the same date.

The Maldives became a member of the following UN agencies and conferences on the following dates:

- United Nations Population Fund (UNFPA) and United Nations Conference on Trade and Development (UNCTAD) - 21 September 1965.
- United Nations Industrial Development Organization (UNIDO) - 5 May 1988
- United Nations Educational, Scientific and Cultural Organization (UNESCO) - 18 July 1980
- United Nations Environment Programme (UNEP) - on 15 December 1972
- United Nations Children's Fund (UNICEF) - 6 April 1971

The United Nations Development Programme has a representative resident in Malé, as do UNICEF and World Health Organization (WHO).

At the UN, the Maldives has highlighted the vulnerability of small states to various threats including terrorism, activities of mercenaries and transnational organized crime. It is also a strong advocate of counter-terrorism and is party to all the main UN conventions against terrorism. Development co-operation is a major priority of the Maldives and it has been campaigning at the UN for a more structured means of graduation from the list of least developed countries targeted for preferential assistance. The main donors to the Maldives are Japan, India, and Australia.

=== Other intergovernmental organizations ===
The Maldives became a member of Non-Aligned Movement on 15 August 1976.

The Maldives were a founder member in 1985 of the South Asian Association for Regional Cooperation (SAARC) and the nation plays a very active role in the association. It has taken the lead in calling for a South Asian Free Trade Agreement, the formulation of a Social Charter, the initiation of informal political consultations in SAARC forums, the lobbying for greater action on environmental issues, the proposal of numerous human rights measures such as the regional convention on child rights and for setting up a SAARC Human Rights Resource Centre. The Maldives is also an advocate of greater international profile for SAARC such as through formulating common positions at the UN.

The Maldives is a member of the Organisation of Islamic Cooperation (OIC) and maintains close cultural relations with Islamic countries. However, the Maldives has often distanced itself from positions taken by the OIC on matters such as the Kashmir dispute, which it regards as a bilateral issue to be settled peacefully between India and Pakistan. It has also not supported the OIC position on issues such as that of Cyprus, subscribing instead to the international stance taken by the United Nations. The Maldives became a member of OIC in August 1974.

== The Maldives and the Commonwealth of Nations ==
The Maldives joined the Commonwealth of Nations on 9 July 1982 as a special member and became a full member on 20 June 1985

The Maldives became a member of the Commonwealth of Learning (COL) in September 1989, the Commonwealth Parliamentary Association (CPA) on 1 January 2000, the Commonwealth Fund for Technical Cooperation (CFTC) in 1985, and the Commonwealth Youth Programme (CYP) on 9 July 1982.

The Maldives withdrew from the Commonwealth in October 2016.

Ibrahim Mohamed Solih, the President of the Maldives and his Cabinet decided that the Maldives will return to its membership of the Commonwealth, following in the footsteps of The Gambia under Adama Barrow's government, which returned to its membership of the Commonwealth on 8 February 2018.

The Maldives returned to its membership of the Commonwealth on 1 February 2020.

== Diplomatic relations ==
List of countries which the Maldives maintains diplomatic relations with:

#	Country	Date
1	United Kingdom	26 July 1965
2	Sri Lanka	26 July 1965
—	Israel (suspended)	29 October 1965
3	India	1 November 1965
4	United States	10 November 1965
5	Italy	1966
6	Germany	5 July 1966
7	Pakistan	26 July 1966
8	Russia	14 September 1966
9	Japan	14 November 1967
10	South Korea	30 November 1967
11	Malaysia	September 1968
12	Egypt	12 February 1969
13	France	20 May 1969
14	Myanmar	12 October 1969
15	North Korea	14 June 1970
16	Iraq	15 September 1971
17	China	14 October 1972
18	Australia	25 January 1974
19	Philippines	12 July 1974
20	Indonesia	2 September 1974
21	New Zealand	10 October 1974
22	Singapore	20 February 1975
23	Serbia	1 March 1975
24	Hungary	24 May 1975
25	Iran	2 June 1975
26	Vietnam	18 June 1975
27	Czech Republic	19 October 1975
28	Mexico	15 November 1975
29	Libya	17 November 1975
30	Cuba	29 January 1977
31	Belgium	3 October 1977
32	Kuwait	1 December 1977
33	Austria	1 March 1978
34	United Arab Emirates	15 March 1978
35	Sweden	21 August 1978
36	Bangladesh	22 September 1978
37	Turkey	28 May 1979
38	Thailand	21 June 1979
39	Spain	25 August 1979
40	Netherlands	3 September 1979
41	Romania	1 November 1979
42	Bahrain	24 March 1980
43	Seychelles	1 July 1980
44	Nepal	1 August 1980
45	Mali	16 October 1980
46	Syria	1981
—	Mauritius (suspended)	15 January 1981
47	Senegal	15 February 1981
48	Oman	20 February 1981
49	Saudi Arabia	17 March 1981
50	Jordan	25 March 1981
51	Sudan	10 June 1981
52	Switzerland	23 June 1981
53	Canada	14 December 1981
54	Denmark	8 November 1982
55	Guinea	8 April 1983
56	Comoros	20 July 1983
57	Tunisia	10 September 1983
58	Greece	17 September 1983
59	Norway	26 March 1984
60	Brunei	31 March 1984
61	Qatar	26 May 1984
62	Bhutan	20 July 1984
63	Bulgaria	14 August 1984
64	Finland	1 October 1984
65	Poland	1 October 1984
66	Yemen	1 November 1984
67	Malta	5 March 1985
68	Mongolia	6 November 1985
69	Zimbabwe	7 January 1987
70	Chile	1 March 1987
71	Argentina	14 May 1987
72	Cyprus	1 November 1987
73	Vanuatu	27 January 1988
74	Morocco	4 February 1988
75	Lebanon	25 February 1988
76	Algeria	8 March 1988
77	Somalia	10 March 1988
78	Fiji	15 March 1988
79	Sierra Leone	14 June 1988
80	Luxembourg	11 July 1988
81	Tanzania	11 August 1988
82	Colombia	22 August 1988
83	Brazil	27 September 1988
84	Papua New Guinea	22 December 1988
—	State of Palestine	1988
85	Peru	6 February 1989
86	Nigeria	1 March 1989
87	Kiribati	20 March 1989
88	Gambia	3 July 1989
89	Panama	10 July 1989
90	Tonga	1 August 1989
91	Ghana	10 August 1989
92	Mauritania	16 October 1989
93	Solomon Islands	18 October 1989
94	Barbados	30 November 1989
95	Iceland	30 January 1990
96	Jamaica	26 February 1990
97	Namibia	26 July 1990
98	Venezuela	1 November 1990
99	Federated States of Micronesia	24 October 1991
100	Marshall Islands	16 December 1991
101	Turkmenistan	25 September 1992
102	Slovakia	1 January 1993
103	Guatemala	27 January 1993
104	Samoa	2 August 1993
105	Ukraine	17 August 1993
106	Kyrgyzstan	31 August 1993
107	Bahamas	28 September 1993
108	Tajikistan	6 October 1993
109	Uganda	30 November 1993
110	Belarus	6 December 1993
111	Estonia	22 March 1994
112	Guyana	13 April 1994
113	Latvia	20 June 1994
114	South Africa	27 July 1994
115	Uzbekistan	7 December 1994
116	Armenia	10 January 1995
117	Portugal	9 February 1995
118	Cambodia	21 September 1995
119	Kenya	23 October 1995
120	Mozambique	27 November 1995
121	Slovenia	4 March 1996
122	Bosnia and Herzegovina	27 January 1997
123	Croatia	8 April 1997
124	Lithuania	2 December 1999
125	Ireland	7 December 1999
126	Belize	11 February 2000
127	Kazakhstan	15 March 2000
128	Nauru	9 May 2000
129	Grenada	13 July 2000
130	North Macedonia	13 November 2000
131	Monaco	19 March 2001
132	Antigua and Barbuda	25 March 2002
133	Timor-Leste	26 November 2002
134	Cape Verde	23 April 2003
135	Saint Vincent and the Grenadines	27 May 2003
136	Dominica	21 July 2004
137	Tuvalu	14 March 2006
138	Afghanistan	17 March 2006
139	Azerbaijan	15 June 2006
140	Gabon	20 March 2008
141	Djibouti	7 April 2008
142	Andorra	19 May 2008
143	Albania	25 June 2008
144	Suriname	23 October 2008
145	Uruguay	24 February 2009
—	Kosovo	15 April 2009
146	Montenegro	24 November 2009
147	Trinidad and Tobago	24 November 2009
148	Georgia	11 March 2010
149	Dominican Republic	17 March 2010
150	Nicaragua	11 May 2010
151	Costa Rica	21 September 2010
152	Paraguay	28 September 2010
153	Liechtenstein	21 January 2011
154	Ecuador	14 March 2011
155	Benin	16 September 2011
156	Honduras	13 October 2011
157	Saint Lucia	2 December 2011
158	Burkina Faso	29 December 2011
159	Laos	10 February 2012
160	Moldova	14 May 2012
161	San Marino	24 April 2014
162	Palau	17 October 2014
163	Saint Kitts and Nevis	21 September 2016
164	El Salvador	19 September 2017
165	Zambia	1 April 2018
166	Ivory Coast	13 April 2018
167	Republic of the Congo	20 April 2018
168	Equatorial Guinea	21 May 2018
169	Central African Republic	24 May 2018
170	Ethiopia	6 August 2018
171	Bolivia	31 May 2019
172	Rwanda	6 September 2019
173	Angola	10 November 2020
174	Eswatini	15 December 2020
175	Eritrea	10 February 2021
176	Lesotho	29 March 2021
177	Burundi	20 January 2022
178	São Tomé and Príncipe	5 April 2022
179	Guinea-Bissau	23 September 2022
180	Malawi	24 September 2022
181	Togo	3 May 2023
182	South Sudan	4 May 2023
183	Botswana	11 December 2023

== Bilateral relations ==
=== China ===
China and Maldives established diplomatic relations on 14 October 1972. Sino-Maldivian economic cooperation and trade volume were for long insignificant, with total trade in 2002 of only US$3 million. Economic ties have recently become more important with large inflows of Chinese tourists to the Maldives since 2010. Capital inflows from China have also rapidly increased since 2008. China's main exports to Maldives are rice and consumer goods. The relations between China and Maldives have increased in Mohamed Nasheed's presidential term. However, before being elected for president, Mohamed Nasheed criticized the Chinese Communist Party saying relations with Communist Chinese were never acceptable due to their views regarding modern democracy. However under president Yaameen, both countries have developed a close relations. Chinese investments and Aid to Maldives increased. Best example of China - Maldives raising relations is the Chinese-Maldives friendship bridge.

Mohamed Muizzu was the first president to visit China before India on 7/1/2024. During the state visit, the two countries agreed to develop an "Action Plan" for establishing a comprehensive strategic cooperation partnership between China and Maldives from 2024 to 2028. Additionally, the two governments agreed to sign 20 MoUs. The Chinese research ship Xiang Yang Hong 03 docked in Male seaport on 8/2/2024. Survey ship is capable of both civilian research and military surveillance . it is located in strategic locations of the Indian Ocean Region (IOR).

=== India ===
Bilateral relations between the Republic of India and the Republic of Maldives have been friendly and close in strategic, economic and military cooperation. India contributed to maintaining security on the island nation and has forged an alliance with respect to its strategic interests in the Indian Ocean.

India and Maldives officially and amicably decided their maritime boundary in 1976, although a minor diplomatic incident occurred in 1982 when the brother of the President of Maldives Maumoon Abdul Gayoom declared that the neighbouring Minicoy Island that belonged to India were a part of Maldives; Maldivies quickly and officially denied that it was laying claim to the island. India and Maldives signed a comprehensive trade agreement in 1981. Both nations are founding members of the South Asian Association for Regional Cooperation (SAARC), the South Asian Economic Union and signatories to the South Asia Free Trade Agreement. Indian and Maldivian leaders have maintained high-level contacts and consultations on regional issues. Diplomatic relations between Maldives and India were established on 1 November 1965.43

The relations faced a strain in January 2024 due to derogatory remarks by Maldivian officials and concerns over racism, targeted towards Indian Prime Minister Narendra Modi as well as India, triggering the 2024 India-Maldives diplomatic row.

This was seen very negatively in India, with citizens calling for a boycott of vacations in Maldives, with many renowned Bollywood actors and personalities criticising the Maldivian government. This also led to the death of a young Maldivian teenager, who had to be taken to India via an air ambulance, after the request at the last minute was denied by Maldivian authorities due to the ongoing tensions against the country.

=== Malaysia ===
The Malaysian High Commission in Colombo is also cross-accredited to the Maldives, and Maldives has a high commission in Kuala Lumpur.

=== Myanmar ===
Maldives and Myanmar established diplomatic relations on 15 January 1970.40 In September 2017, the Ministry of Foreign Affairs of the Maldives announced that it was ceasing all trade ties with Myanmar in response to the government's treatment of the Rohingya people in Rakhine State.

=== Pakistan ===
In November 2004, Pakistan Prime Minister Shaukat Aziz visited the Maldives and met with President Maumoon Abdul Gayoom. Aziz offered to extend credit facility, scholarships, collaboration in scientific and technological fields and training of civil servants, defence and security personnel to Maldives. In October 2005, Pakistan-Maldives Joint Economic Commission commenced.

=== South Korea ===
The establishment of diplomatic relations of Maldives and South Korea were on 30 November 1967 and Bilateral Trade in 2012 was Exports $3.67 million Imports $380 thousand.

=== Sri Lanka ===
Official and economic relations between the neighbouring Indian Ocean countries of the Maldives and Sri Lanka, have been positive since the Maldives became independent in 1965. The Maldives first established a mission in Sri Lanka in July 1965, and today has a High Commission in Colombo. Sri Lanka has a high commission in Malé. Both countries were founding members of the South Asian Association for Regional Cooperation (SAARC) in December 1985. On 13 February 2014 Zahiya Zareer was appointed by President Abdulla Yameen as High Commissioner to Sri Lanka.

The Maldives has an embassy in Bangkok and Thailand is accredited to the Maldives via its embassy in Colombo, Sri Lanka

=== Middle East ===
==== Israel ====
The Maldives established diplomatic relations with Israel in 1965 and suspended them in 1974.

In 2009, under president Mohamed Nasheed, the Maldives signed cooperation agreements with Israel on tourism, health, and education and culture. In 2010, the Israeli government sent a team of eye doctors to treat patients and train local medical personnel in the Maldives. However, the renewed relationship did not develop into full diplomatic relations.

In July 2014, under president Abdulla Yameen, the Maldives terminated the cooperation agreements with Israel and announced a boycott of Israeli products, as Israel launched a military operation in Gaza. Foreign minister Dunya Maumoon also announced that the Maldives would fully support Palestinians at international forums such as the United Nations Human Rights Council and offer them humanitarian aid.

==== Saudi Arabia ====
On 12 May 2008, the Maldivian embassy was opened in Riyadh which was the first Maldivian mission in the Middle East.42

==== Turkey ====
Both countries established diplomatic relations on 28 May 1979.

=== Africa ===
==== Mauritius ====
Both the Maldives and Mauritius were former British Indian Ocean possessions, and both now have similar tourist-oriented economies. Relations between the two islands are friendly, and there is some economic cooperation.

=== North and South America ===
==== United States ====
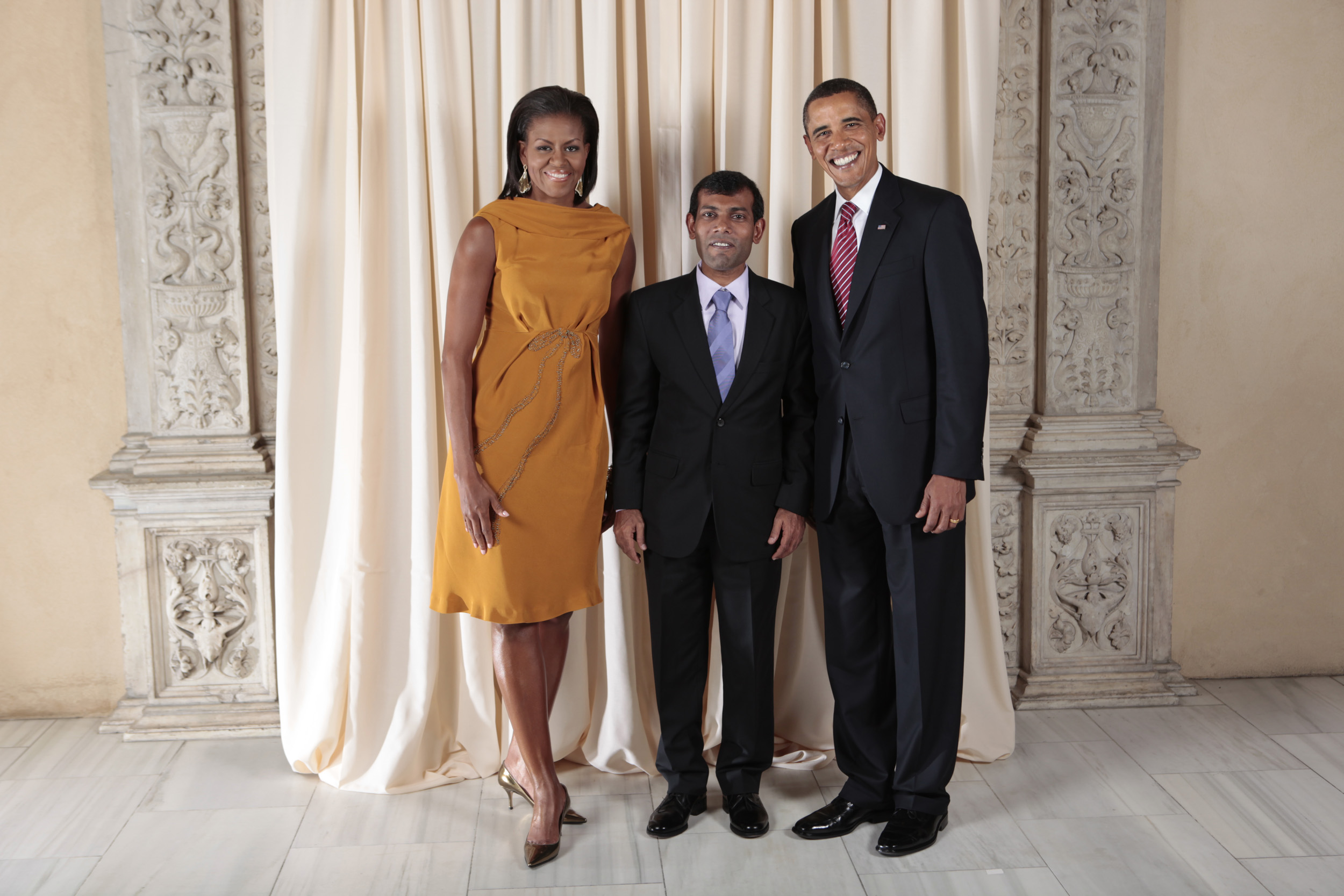
Former U.S. President Barack Obama, former First Lady Michelle Obama and former Maldivian President Mohamed Nasheed in 2009

The Maldives established diplomatic relations with the United States on 10 November 1965 and the two nations maintain friendly relations.

he United States supports Maldivian independence and territorial integrity, and publicly endorsed India's timely intervention on behalf of the Maldivian Government during the 1988 Maldives coup d'état attempt. U.S. Navy vessels have regularly called at Malé in recent years. The Maldives extended strong support to U.S. efforts to combat terrorism and terrorist financing in 2001–2002.

=== Europe ===
==== Cyprus ====
- Cyprus and the Maldives do maintain diplomatic relations.
- Both countries established diplomatic relations on 1 November 1997.
- Cyprus is represented in the Maldives by its High Commission in New Delhi, India.
- Both countries are full members of the Commonwealth of Nations.

==== Finland ====
Finland recognized the Maldives on 15 October 1965. Diplomatic relations between Maldives and Finland were established on 10 August 1984.

==== Germany ====
The Maldives and the Federal Republic of Germany established diplomatic relations in 1966.

==== Greece ====
- Both countries established diplomatic relations on 6 December 1983.
- Greece is represented in Sri Lanka by ts embassy in New Delhi, India.
- Maldives have an honorary consulate in Athens.

==== Kosovo ====
The Maldives recognized Kosovo on 19 February 2009. On 16 April 2009, Kosovo and the Maldives established diplomatic relations with one another.

On 7 March, the then Maldivian President Mohamed Nasheed asked police to investigate the allegations of a US$2 million bribe given to Maldivian government officials to recognise Kosovo as an independent state. On 17 March, People's Majlis National Security Committee launched probe into Islamic Democratic Party's allegations regarding the bribery. Balkan Insight reported that Kosovo businessman, Behgjet Pacolli, who also heads the New Kosovo Alliance party, has denied any involvement in the bribery case and stated that he only lobbied for the recognition of Kosovo. Foreign Minister Ahmed Shaheed was cross-examined by the parliamentary committee on 28 March. The police investigation was closed on 6 May 2009, concluding that there was no evidence of corruption and the diplomatic process was conducted according to international standards; the NSC investigation was suspended.

==== United Kingdom ====
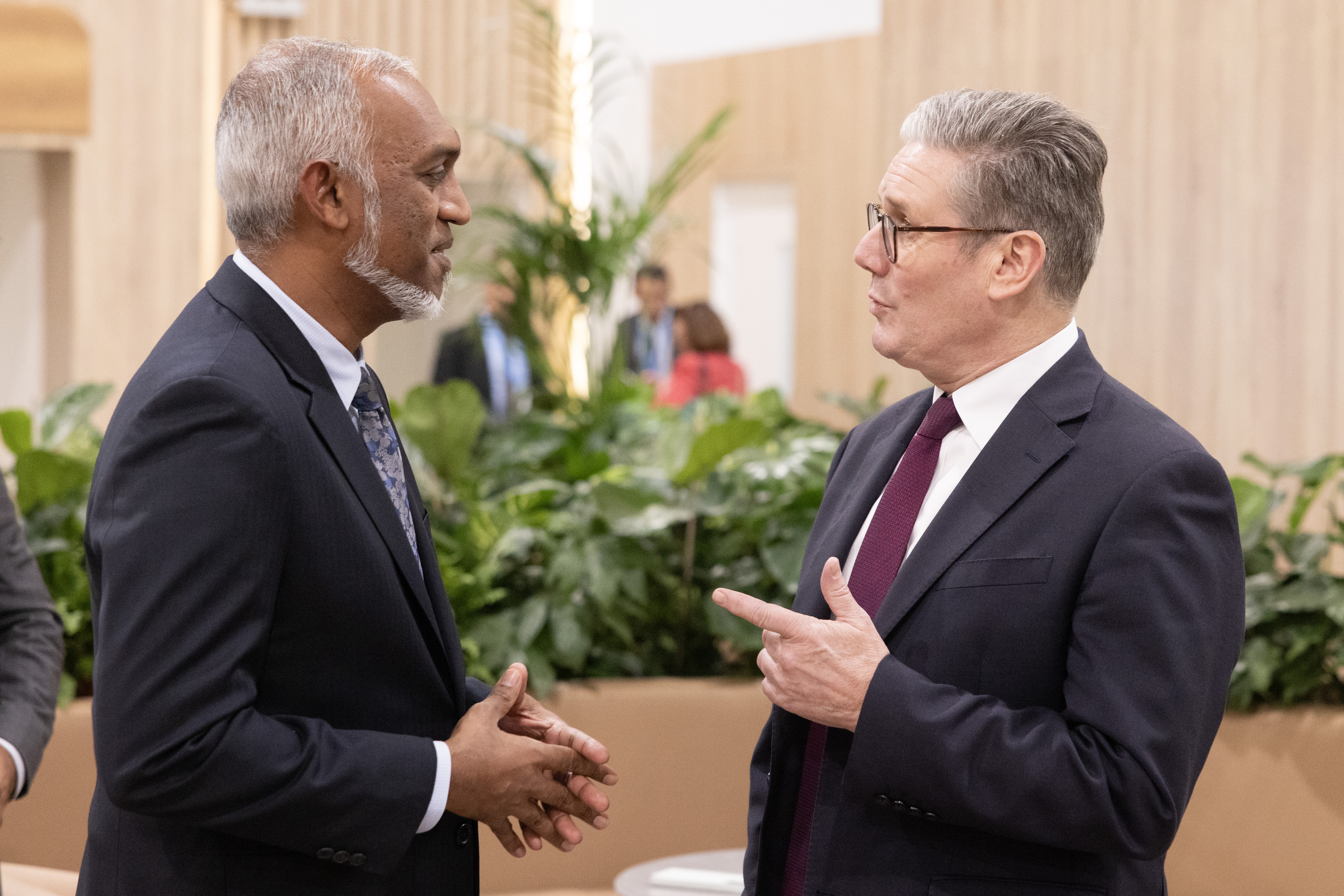
Maldivian President Mohamed Muizzu with British Prime Minister Keir Starmer at COP29 in Baku, November 2024.

The Maldives established diplomatic relations with the United Kingdom on 26 July 1965.

- The Maldives maintains a high commission in London.
- The United Kingdom is accredited to the Maldives through its high commission in Malé.

The UK governed the Maldives from 1796 to 1965, when it achieved full independence.

Both countries share common membership of the Commonwealth, the International Criminal Court, the United Nations, and the World Trade Organization. The two countries are currently negotiating a Free Trade Agreement.

The Maldives became a British Protectorate in the 19th century and the Maldivian monarchs were granted a good measure of self-governance. The Maldives gained full independence from Britain in 1965. The maritime border with the British Indian Ocean Territory (BIOT) remains undemarcated, with negotiations with the UK being broken off by the Maldives in the late 1990s.

== Embassies and High Commissions of the Maldives ==
The following is a list of the current Ambassadors and High Commissioners of the Maldives with their assigned host country:-

High Commissions
Host country	High Commissioner	Website
Bangladesh	Shiuneen Rasheed	-
India	Ibrahim Shaheeb	Website
Malaysia	Mariyam Shabeena Ahmed	Website
Pakistan	Mohamed Thoha	Website
Singapore	Mohamed Luveiz	Website
Sri Lanka	Omar Abdul Razzak	Website
United Kingdom	Iruthisham Adam	Website

Embassies
Host country	Ambassador	Embassy Website
Belgium	Geela Ali	Website
China	Huda Ali Shareef (chargé d'affaires)	Website
Germany	Aishath Shaan Shakir	-
Japan	Hassan Sobir	Website
Saudi Arabia	Adam Hassan	-
Switzerland	Iruthisham Adam	-
Turkey	Abdul Raheem Abdul Latheef	-
United Arab Emirates	Mohamed Hussain Shareef	-
United States	Abdul Ghafoor Mohamed	Website

Consulates in a non-resident capacity
Host country	Ambassador	Residency
Denmark	Farahanaz Faisal	United Kingdom
Egypt	Adam Hassan	Saudi Arabia
Finland	Farahanaz Faisal	United Kingdom
France	Farahanaz Faisal	United Kingdom
Italy	Iruthisham Adam	Switzerland
Lebanon	Adam Hassan	Saudi Arabia
Libya	Adam Hassan	Saudi Arabia
Luxembourg	Ali Hussain Didi	Belgium
Netherlands	Ali Hussain Didi	Belgium
Norway	Farahanaz Faisal	United Kingdom
Palestine	Farahanaz Faisal	United Kingdom
Russia	Ahmed Latheef	Germany
Spain	Farahanaz Faisal	United Kingdom
Sweden	Ahmed Latheef	Germany
Syria	Adam Hassan	Saudi Arabia
Turkey	Iruthisham Adam	Switzerland

Representatives to International Organizations
Organization / Post	Ambassador	Office Website
United Nations (New York)	[Ali Naseer Mohamed]	Website
United Nations Office (Geneva)	Salma Shareef	Website
European Union (Brussels)	Geela Ali	Website
Organisation of Islamic Cooperation (Jeddah)	Adam Hassan	-
(United Nations) World Trade Organization (Geneva)	Asim Ahmed	-

== See also ==
- List of diplomatic missions in the Maldives
- List of diplomatic missions of the Maldives
- Maldives and the World Bank
