= Economy of the Maldives =

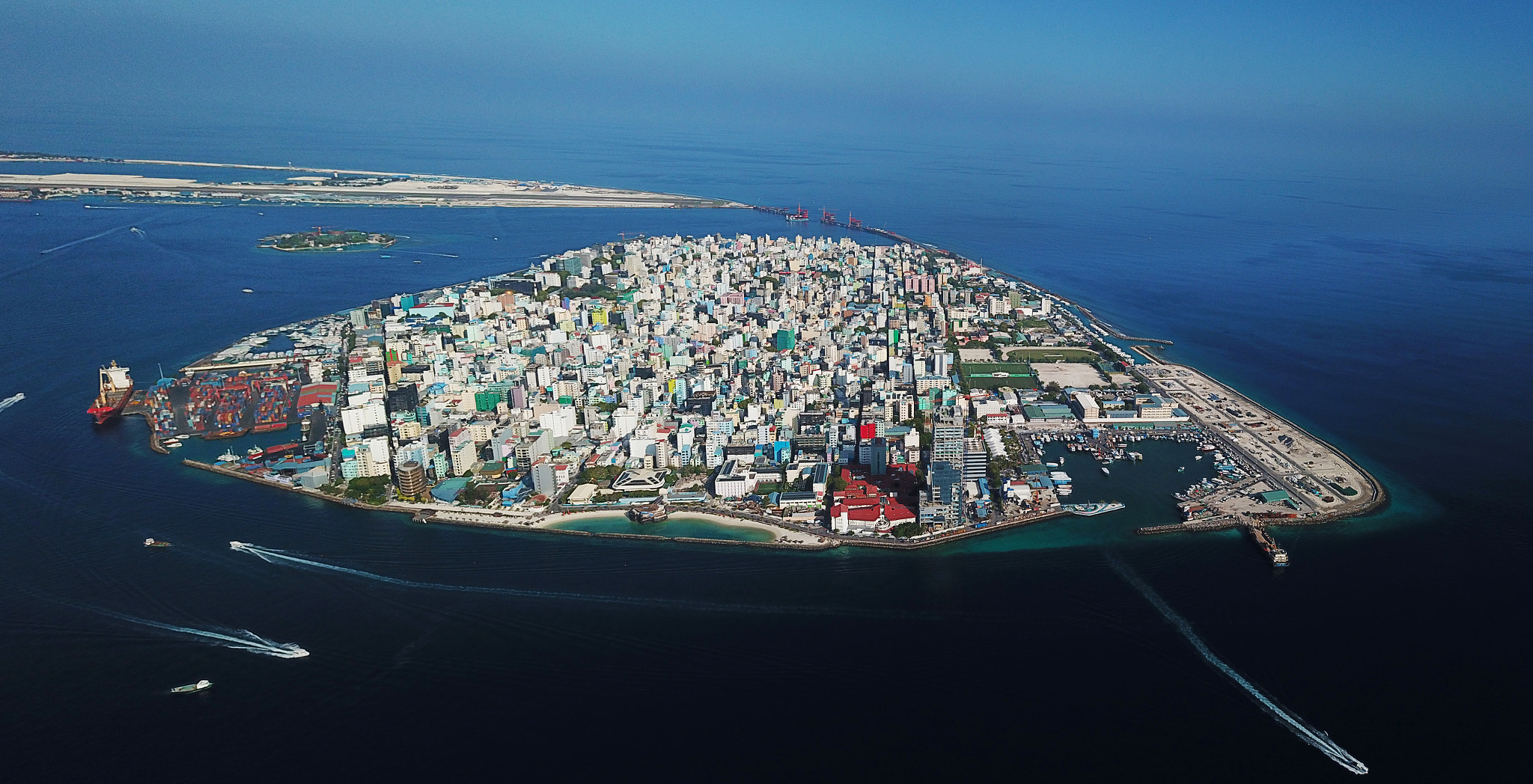
- Malé, commercial centre of Maldives
- Currency: Maldivian rufiyaa (MVR, Rf)
- Fiscal year: Calendar year
- Trade organisations: WTO, SAFTA
- Country group: Developing/Emerging; Upper-middle-income

Statistics
- GDP: ▲$7.7 billion (nominal, 2025 est.); ▲$14.9 billion (PPP, 2025/2026 est.)
- GDP rank: 147th (nominal, 2025); 156th (PPP, 2025)
- GDP growth: 6.9% (2018) 5.2% (2019e); −13.0% (2020f) 8.5% (2021f)
- GDP per capita: ▲$17,287 (nominal, 2024 est.); ▲$34,000 (PPP, 2021 est.)
- GDP per capita rank: 61st (nominal, 2025); 58th (PPP, 2025)
- GDP by sector: Agriculture (4%), industry (23%), services (73%) (2012 est.)
- Inflation (CPI): 2.3% (2022 est.)
- Population below national poverty line: 8.2% (2016); 6.6% on less than $5.50/day (2016)
- Gini coefficient: 31.3 medium (2016)
- Human Development Index: ▲0.747 high (2021) (90th); ▲0.594 medium IHDI (2021)
- Labour force: ▲278,813 (2019); 54.1% employment rate (2016)
- Main industries: Fish processing, tourism, shipping, boat building, coconut processing, garments, woven mats, rope, handicrafts, sand mining

External
- Exports: $238 million (2021)
- Export goods: Fish
- Main export partners: Thailand 28.7% India 20.4% Germany 11.8% UK 4.44% France 4.04% (2021)
- Imports: $2.83 billion (2021)
- Import goods: Petroleum products, ships, foodstuffs, clothing, intermediate and capital goods
- Main import partners: India 14.7% China 14% UAE 13% Oman 9.65% Singapore 9.02% (2021)
- Gross external debt: $742 million (2014 est.)

Public finance
- Government debt: $316 million (2004 est.)
- Foreign reserves: $540 million (September 2016 est.)
- Revenue: $758 million (2010 est.)
- Spending: $362 million; including capital expenditures of $80 million (2004 est.)
- Economic aid: N/A
- All values, unless otherwise stated, are in US dollars.

The economy of the Maldives is a mixed economy that is based on the principal activities of tourism, fishing and shipping. Since the 1970s the economy of the Maldives has developed rapidly. Annual growth of gross domestic product (GDP) has been high, averaging about 6 percent in the 2010s, and the gross national income (GNI) per capita reached the level of most upper middle-income countries by the late 2010s.

In ancient times, Maldives were renowned for cowries, coir rope, dried tuna fish (Maldive fish), ambergris (maavaharu) and coco de mer (tavakkaashi). Local and foreign trading ships used to load these products in the Maldives and bring them abroad.

Tourism is the largest industry in the Maldives, accounting for 28% of GDP and more than 60% of the Maldives' foreign exchange receipts. It powered the current GDP per capita to expand 265% in the 1980s and a further 115% in the 1990s. Over 90% of government tax revenue flows in from import duties and tourism-related taxes.

Fishing is the second leading sector in the Maldives. The economic reform program by the government in 1989 lifted import quotas and opened some exports to the private sector. Subsequently, it has liberalised regulations to allow more foreign investment.

Agriculture and manufacturing play a minor role in the economy, constrained by the limited availability of cultivable land and shortage of domestic labour. Most staple foods are imported.

Industry in the Maldives consists mainly of garment production, boat building, and handicrafts. It accounts for around 18% of GDP. Maldivian authorities are concerned about the impact of erosion and possible global warming in the low-lying country.

Among the 1,190 islands in the Maldives, only 198 are inhabited. The population is scattered throughout the country, and the greatest concentration is on the capital island, Malé. Limitations on potable water and arable land, plus the added difficulty of congestion are some of the problems faced by households in Malé.

Development of the infrastructure in the Maldives is mainly dependent on the tourism industry and its complementary tertiary sectors, transport, distribution, real estate, construction, and government. Taxes on the tourist industry have been plowed into infrastructure and it is used to improve technology in the agricultural sector.

== History ==
Historically, the Maldives provided enormous quantities of cowry shells, an international currency of the early ages. From the 2nd century CE, the islands were known as the 'Money Isles' by the Arabs. Monetaria moneta was used for centuries as a currency in Africa, and huge amounts of Maldivian cowries were introduced into Africa by western nations during the period of slave trade. The cowry is now the symbol of the Maldives Monetary Authority.

In the early 1970s and 1980s, the Maldives was one of the world's 20 poorest countries, with a population of 100,000. The economy at the time was largely dependent on fisheries and trading local goods such as coir rope, ambergris (Maavaharu), and coco de mer (Tavakkaashi) with neighbouring countries and East Asian countries.

The Maldivian government began a largely successful economic reform programme in the 1980s, initiated by lifting import quotas and giving more opportunities to the private sector. At that time, the tourism sector was in its infant stage but would later play a significant role in the nation's development. Agriculture and manufacturing continue to play lesser roles in the economy, constrained by the limited availability of cultivable land and the shortage of domestic labour.

== Macro-economic trend ==
This is a chart of trend of gross domestic product of Maldives at market prices estimated by the International Monetary Fund with figures in millions of rufiyaa.

Year	Gross domestic product	US dollar exchange	Per capita income (as % of USA)
1980	440	7.58 rufiyaa	3.11
1985	885	7.08 rufiyaa	3.85
1990	2,054	9.55 rufiyaa	4.34
1995	4,696	11.76 rufiyaa	6.29
2000	7,348	11.77 rufiyaa	6.77
2005	10,458	12.80 rufiyaa	5.33
2011	10,458	15.40 rufiyaa	7.43

The Maldives has experienced relatively low inflation throughout the recent years. Real GDP growth averaged about 10% in the 1980s. It expanded by an exceptional 16.2% in 1990, declined to 4% in 1993, and, over the 1995–2004 decade, real GDP growth averaged just over 7.5% per year. In 2005, as a result of the tsunami, the GDP contracted by about 5.5%; however, the economy rebounded in 2006 with a 13% increase.

The following table shows the main economic indicators in 1980–2020.

Year	1980	1985	1990	1995	2000	2005	2010	2015	2020
GDP in $ (PPP)	0.24 bn.	0.51 bn.	0.80 bn.	1.24 bn.	2.01 bn.	2.86 bn.	4.65 bn.	7.63 bn.	7.27 bn.
GDP per capita in $ (PPP)	1,599	2,791	3,768	5,090	7,444	9,732	14,528	21,931	19,222
Inflation (in Percent Change)	27.9 %	-9.16%	15.5 %	5.49 %	−1.18 %	2.46 %	6.15 %	1.37 %	-1.59%
Government debt (Percentage of GDP)	...	...	...	...	39 %	43 %	53 %	55 %	146 %

== Economic sectors ==
=== Tourism ===
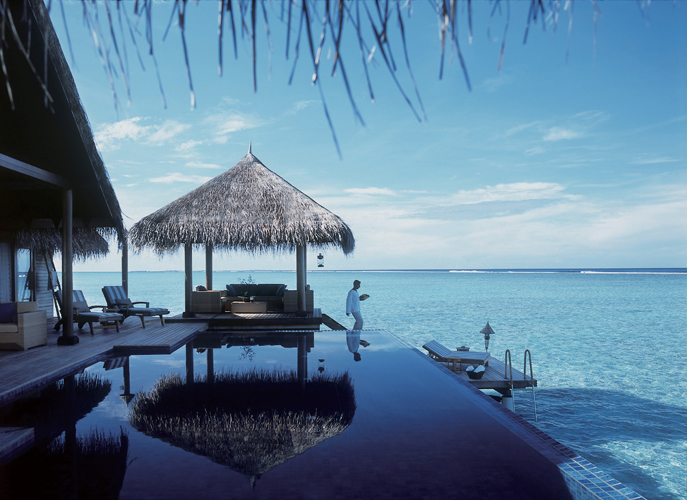
An island resort in the Maldives

Tourism is the largest economic industry in the Maldives, as it plays an important role in earning foreign exchange revenues and employs 25,000 people in the tertiary sector of the country. The archipelago of the Maldives is the main source of attraction to many tourists visiting the island country. Entrepreneurs have been swiftly amassing assets connected to the tourism sector in the Maldives. Given that tourism is the primary economic driver in the Maldives, this trend is affording the substantial influence over the nation's economy.

The tourism industry is especially vulnerable to climate change: as one of the island nations expected to be most impacted by climate change, sea level rise and subsequent increased extreme weather, coastal flooding, and coral bleaching damage the natural attractions that bring many of the tourists to the country.

=== Fishing ===
The fishing industry in the Maldives is the island's second main industry. According to national tradition in the words of former President Maumoon Abdul Gayoom, "Fishing is the lifeblood of our nation, it is inborn. From the soil on which we live, to the sea around us, it remains an integral part of our existence. Fishing, and our country and its people, [are] one and shall remain inseparable forever." The Maldives has an abundance of aquatic life and species of fish. Common are tuna, groupers, dolphin fish, barracuda, rainbow runner, trevally and squirrelfish and many more. Aside from being of essential importance to the economy, fishing is also a popular recreational activity in the Maldives, not only among locals but by tourists. The islands have numerous fishing resorts which cater for these activities.

The Maldives is an archipelago in the Indian Ocean, located southwest of the southern tip of India. Its population in 2008 was 386,000. There are twenty-six atolls containing 1,192 islets, of which two hundred and fifty islands are inhabited. The low level of islands makes them vulnerable to sea level rises.

=== Industry ===
The industrial sector provides only about 7% of GDP. Traditional industry consists of boat building and handicrafts, while modern industry is limited to a few tuna canneries, five garment factories, a bottling plant, and a few enterprises in the capital producing PVC pipe, soap, furniture, and food products. There are no patent laws in the Maldives.

=== Financial ===
The banking industry dominates the small financial sector of the Maldives. The country's seven banks are regulated by the Maldives Monetary Authority.

While formerly the Maldives had no income, sales, property, or capital-gains taxes, and was considered to have the simplest tax code in the world, now taxation is regulated by the Maldives Inland Revenue Authority (MIRA). In 2011, the Tax Justice Network gave the Maldives a "secrecy score" of 92 on its Financial Secrecy Index - the highest score in that category of any actively-ranked country; however by 2022 with a secrecy score of 75, no longer ranked in the top ten. However, in both 2011 and 2022, the Maldives' minor market share put it near the bottom of the overall weighted lists.

A recurrent trend of China leveraging its economic influence to attain geopolitical goals is observable. This pattern is not confined solely to small island nations in the Indian Ocean, like the Maldives and Sri Lanka, but extends to the wider Indo-Pacific region, encompassing countries with sizeable and advanced economies as well. The Maldives government is grappling with concerns about falling into a potential debt entrapment with China.

=== Education ===
Historically in Maldives the children aged three and up in the Maldives were educated in traditional schools known as "Kiyavaage" or "Edhurge", generally using a single large room or the shelter of tree. The children learned simple arithmetic, Dhivehi and some Arabic, and practised reciting the Qur'an. These private schools no longer exist, as western style schools replaced them in the 1980s–1990s.

The first western-style school in the Maldives is Majeediyya School, a secondary established in 1927. The school was originally co-educational, but it was felt necessary to create a second school for girls (Aminiya School) in 1944.

Based on a study by educational advisors from UNESCO, the Government of Maldives began implementation of the Educational Development Project on 6 October 1976. This Project constituted a comprehensive programme of educational development comprising Expansion of Primary Education, Teacher Training, Curriculum Development, Educational Radio, Community Education Programme for Adult Education and Textbook Development and Printing. The first school under this project was opened in Baa Atoll Eydhafushi in March 1978 followed by another two in N. Manadhoo and HDh. Kulhudhuffushi in March 1979. School construction was continued in all atolls and was later complemented by Primary Schools construction project by Japan. Curriculum Development began in 1976, while Teacher Training began in 1977. Simultaneously, other programmes were introduced and continued through the 1970s and until the mid-1980s from where on the First Ten Year Master Plan for Educational (1986–1995) began implementation. Second Master Plan was implemented 1996–2005. These were the bases of educational development in the Maldives begun by the government of President Nasir continued by President Gayoom.

As of 2002, the President's Office claimed that universal primary education has almost been achieved and the literacy rate had improved from 70 per cent in 1978 to 98.82 per cent. In 2005, there were 106,220 students in schools, or 40% of the total population.

=== Healthcare ===
The Human Rights Measurement Initiative finds that Maldives is fulfilling 72.0% of what it should be fulfilling for the right to health based on its level of income. When looking at the right to health with respect to children, Maldives achieves 98.0% of what is expected based on its current income. In regards to the right to health amongst the adult population, the country achieves 99.7% of what is expected based on the nation's level of income. Maldives falls into the "very bad" category when evaluating the right to reproductive health because the nation is fulfilling only 18.2% of what the nation is expected to achieve based on the resources (income) it has available.

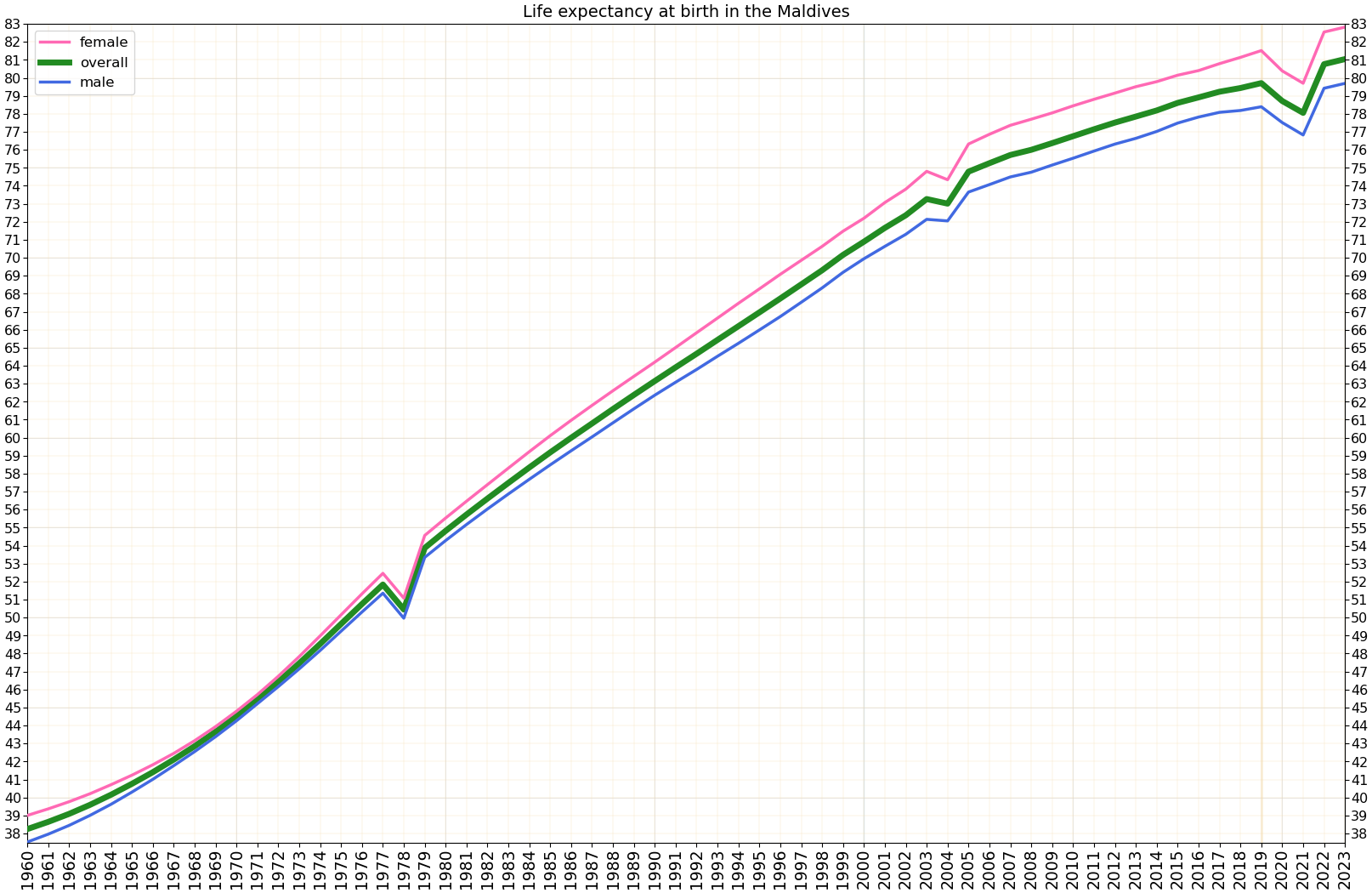
Life expectancy in the Maldives

Life expectancy at birth in Maldives was 77 years in 2011. Infant mortality fell from 34 per 1,000 in 1990 to 15 in 2004. There is increasing disparity between health in the capital and on the other islands. There is also a problem of malnutrition. Imported food is expensive.

On 24 May 2021, the Maldives experienced the world's fastest-growing COVID-19 outbreak, recording the highest number of infections per million people during the preceding seven- and fourteen-day periods, according to data compiled by Bloomberg. Medical professionals warned that the rising demand for COVID-19 care could affect their capacity to manage other health emergencies in the country.

Preventive and public health falls within the remit of the Health Protection Agency.

The Society for Health Education provides sexual and reproductive health information and services to young people and is supported by the United Nations Population Fund.

=== Shipping ===
Beginning in the 1990s, the Port of Male received over £10 million in loans from the Asian Development Bank designated for infrastructure upgraded. The ADB notes that from 1991 to 2011, due to the loans, the ports annual throughput in freight tons equalled 273,000. By 2011 that number reached 1 million. The ADB also provided training for port authority staff to increase efficiency. ADB and the Government of Maldives, in a joint report address ship turn-around, "What used to take about 10 days in 1991 was achieved in 3.8 days by 1997, and about 2.6 days by 2014".

=== Transport ===
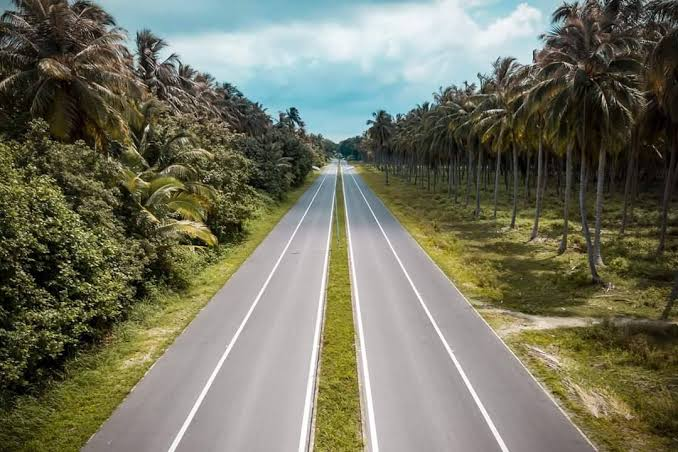
Laamu Link Road

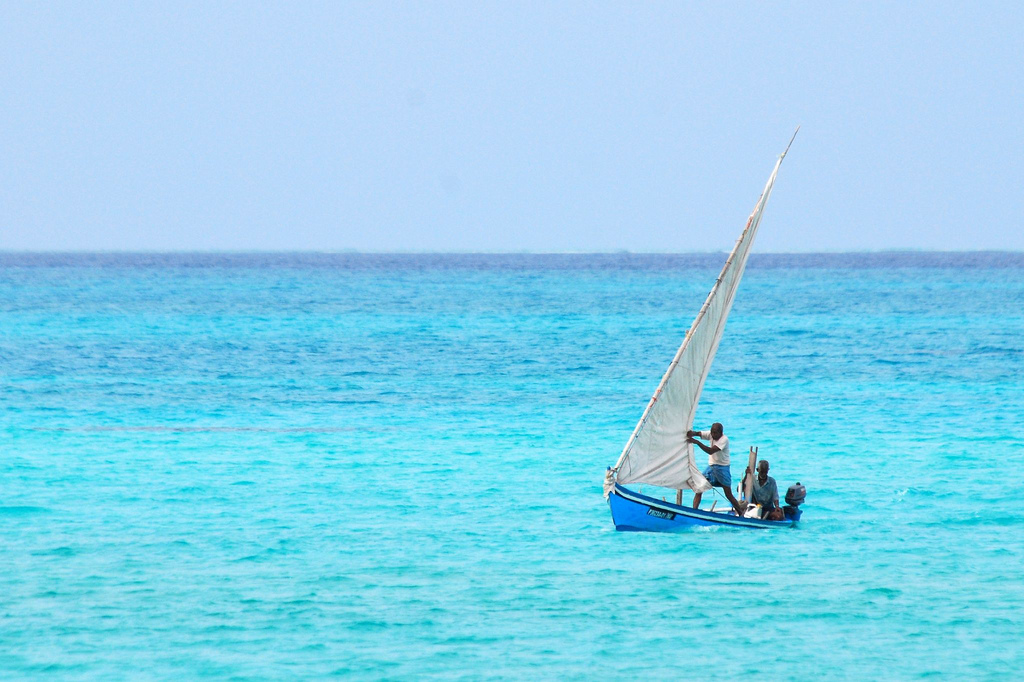
Dhoni in the Maldives

Transport in the Maldives is highly facilitated by road, bridges, highways, air and water networks. The country has no railways. Transportation in the Maldives primarily revolves around its maritime and air travel systems, given the archipelagic nature of the country, which consists of 26 atolls and over 1,000 coral islands. The absence of extensive road networks between islands necessitates a heavy reliance on boats and seaplanes for inter-island connectivity. Dhoni, traditional Maldivian wooden boats, and modern speedboats are widely used for short distances and local travel, while ferries provide regular services between inhabited islands. For longer journeys, the Maldives domestic airlines operate seaplane and airplane services that link the capital, Malé, with outlying atolls, enhancing both passenger and cargo transport across the islands.

Malé, the capital city, serves as the central hub for the country’s transportation network. Velana International Airport, located on nearby Hulhulé Island, is the primary gateway for international travel, with frequent connections to major global destinations. This airport also handles a significant volume of domestic traffic, alongside other regional airports dispersed across the atolls. For intra-city travel within Malé and its nearby islands, roads and a network of causeways and bridges facilitate movement. Notably, the Sinamalé Bridge connects Malé to Hulhulé Island, improving accessibility to the international airport. Overall, the transportation infrastructure of the Maldives is crucial for its tourism-driven economy and the mobility of its residents.

=== Water supply and sanitation ===
The Maldives has been actively enhancing its water and sanitation infrastructure, with the aim for universal access to safe, piped water and sewerage systems across all inhabited islands. While at least 68% of the population has access to piped water and sewerage, significant challenges remained in providing consistent, affordable and safe water, especially during dry seasons.

== Environmental concerns ==
There is growing concern towards the coral reef and marine life due to coral mining (used for building and jewellery making), sand dredging, solid waste pollution and oil spills from boats. Mining of sand and coral has destroyed the natural coral reef that once protected several important islands, now making them highly susceptible to the erosive effects of the sea. The destruction of large coral beds due to heat is also a growing concern.

In April 1987, high tides swept over the Maldives, inundating much of Malé and nearby islands which prompted Maldivian authorities to take global climatic changes seriously. An INQUA research in 2003 found that actual sea levels in the Maldives had dropped in the 1970s and forecasts little change in the next century. There is also concern over the questionable shark fishing practices in place in the island. Shark fishing is forbidden by law, but these laws are not enforced. The population of sharks has sharply decreased in recent years.

The Asian brown cloud hovering in the atmosphere over the northern Indian Ocean is also another concern. Studies show that decreased sunshine and increased acid rain source from this cloud.

== Energy ==
The Maldives relies heavily on imported petroleum for electricity, with diesel-fired power stations servicing the islands and the capital, Malé. While 100% of the population has access to electricity, costs are high. The country is transitioning toward renewable energy due to climate change and high diesel costs.

While electricity in the Maldives has historically come entirely from diesel generators, solar power has been increasingly adopted to avoid high fuel costs. The resort on Dhiddhoofinolhu claims to have the world's largest oceanic floating solar plant, with 678 kW enough to supply peak demand. The country's Environment Ministry has deployed solar–battery–diesel hybrid systems across the outer islands to reduce subsidies for imported diesel and promote low-carbon energy independence.

Investment in renewable energy has increased in recent years, with solar photovoltaic systems becoming the main alternative to diesel generation. Renewable-energy projects have introduced solar capacity and battery storage to island electricity grids, with planned investments expected to provide more than 53.5 MW of solar capacity and 50 MWh of battery storage. Solar-battery-diesel hybrid systems have also been installed across the outer islands, with projects covering approximately 160 islands and designed to reduce diesel consumption and improve the efficiency of electricity generation.² These developments are intended to increase the share of renewable energy in the electricity supply while reducing fuel use, generation costs and greenhouse-gas emissions.

== Trade ==
Exports of the Maldives by product category (2019) Chemical products Transportation Machines Mineral products Plastics and rubbers Metals Foodstuffs Precious metals Textiles Instruments Animal products Vegetable products Paper goods Footwear and headwear Miscellaneous Stone and glass Wood products Animal and vegetable bi-products Animal hides Arts and antiques Weapons

An import-dependent country, Maldives faces significant fiscal pressures as increased global food and fuel prices in recent years have led to a five-fold increase in fuel subsidies paid by the government. Growing annual fiscal deficits, unsustainable external debt, and spending on large infrastructure projects and costly social welfare programs, combined with the economic impact from global events has increased economic uncertainties.

The Maldives relies heavily on imports to meet its domestic and tourism sector needs, with total annual imports of $2.8 billion in 2024. Top import partners in 2024 were India, China and Singapore.

In 2024, Maldives exported $274 million of goods, according to global customs data. Fishing products constitute the majority of Maldivian exports. The top Maldivian export destinations in 2024 were India, Thailand and the United Kingdom.

== Poverty, income and gender inequality ==
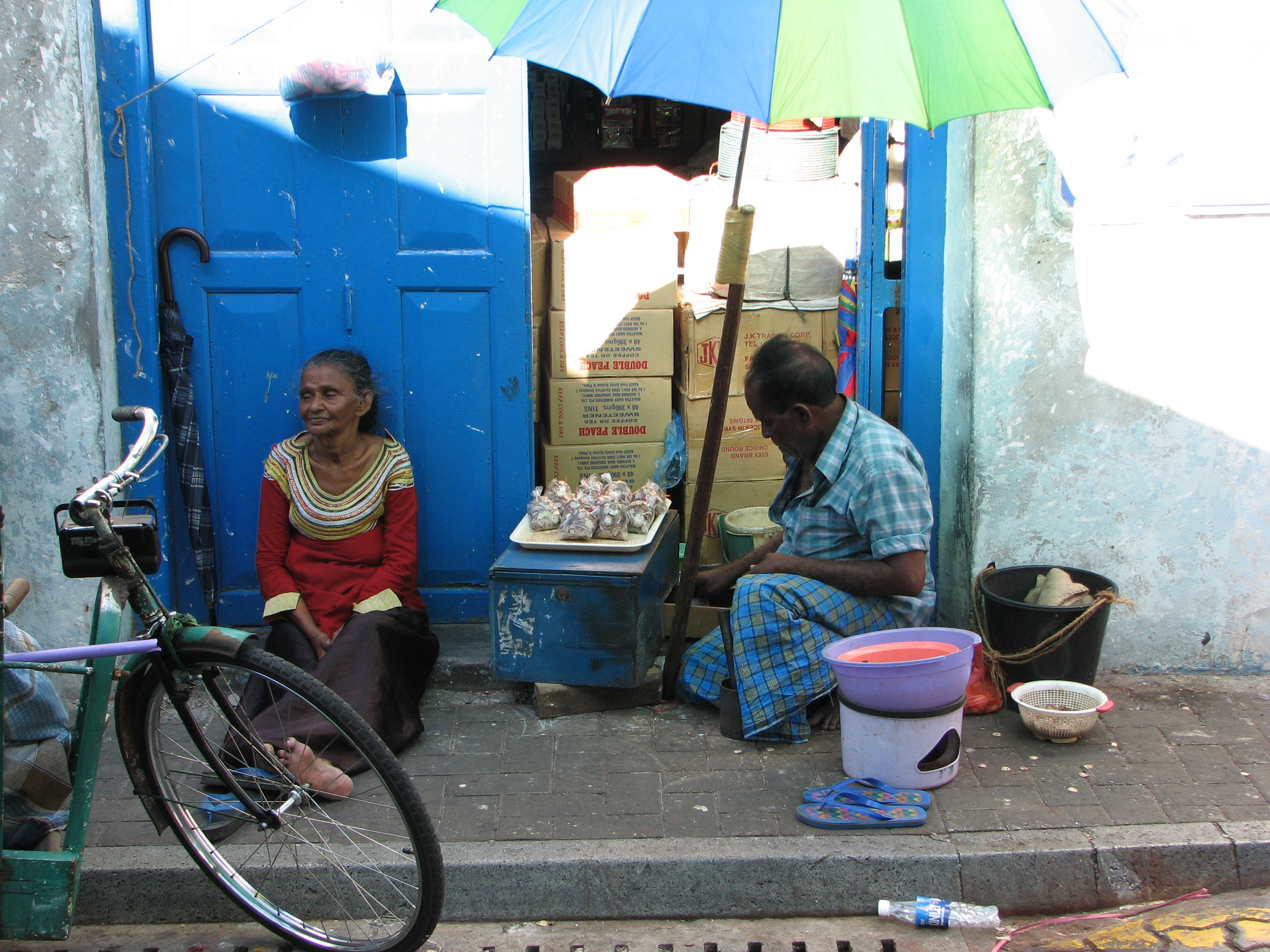
Old street sellers in Malé

Maldives achieved their Millennium Development Goal (MDG) of halving the proportion of people living under the poverty line to 1% as of 2011. Starvation is non-existent, HIV rates have fallen and malaria has been eradicated. Despite these accomplishments and progressive economic growth, developmental issues remain. In particular, the country needs to address income and gender disparities. Development in Maldives has occurred predominantly in the capital Malé; islands outside the capital continue to encounter high poverty vulnerability, lower per-capita income, lower employment and limited access to social services. A country-wide household income survey in 1997-1998 showed that the average income in the capital Malé was 75% higher than in surrounding islands. Maldives's Gini co-efficient stands at 0.41.

=== Poverty and Income Disparity ===
The factors that have led to Maldivians falling into or remaining in poverty are:

1. Geography: Residents of the northern regions of Maldives tend to remain in poverty more than other regions due to the relatively lower level of development in the North;
2. Health: Maldivians who do not work due to poor health remain in poverty possibly on account of lower accessibility to health services in the country;
3. Young household members: Larger proportion of young family members results in a lower overall household income;
4. Female household members: Lower female labour participation rate and therefore, households with a greater proportion of females will have lower household income.

The difficulty of accessing social services and infrastructure in the outer atolls has meant that geography is a key reason for poverty and income disparity in Maldives. In islands far from the capital, there tends to be lack of production, inadequate use of fishery resources, low value chain development and insufficient credit for small-scale producers and entrepreneurs. The scarcity of land and water, the underdeveloped farming practices and absence of support services in atolls has meant low production and thus low incomes in these regions.

=== Current Efforts ===
The government has recognised these issues of income and gender disparities and with the United Nations Development Programme (UNDP), Maldives has implemented policies that directly address these issues. In 2011, President Nasheed said, "The most important facility for a country's development is its people... and since women are half of the population in any country, for a certainty their full participation will speed up the pace of development."

== See also ==
- Climate change in the Maldives
- Corruption in the Maldives
- Economic aid to the Maldives
- Economy of South Asia
- List of protected areas of Maldives
- Maldives and the World Bank
- Maritime Silk Road
- South Asian Free Trade Area
