= High Commission of the Maldives, Singapore =

Diplomatic mission of the Maldives in Singapore

- Address: 101 Thomson Road, 30-01A United Square, Singapore 307591
- Opened: November 2007
- Website: maldivesmission.sg

The High Commission of the Maldives in Singapore (Dhivehi: ސިންގަޕޫރުގައި ހުންނަ ދިވެހިރާއްޖޭގެ ހައިކޮމިޝަން) is the overseas diplomatic mission of the Maldives located in Singapore. It is located at 101 Thomson Road, 30-01A United Square, Singapore 307591

== History ==
Diplomatic relations were established between Singapore and the Maldives on 20 February 1975. The Maldives had not sent a High Commissioner to Singapore for more than 30 years, but Ibrahim Shaheed Zaki served as the country's first non-resident High Commissioner from 30 March to 1 May 2007.

In November 2007, a High Commission office was opened in Singapore. From November 29, 2007, to 2008, Hassan Sobir served as the first permanent High Commissioner.

The embassy was the Embassy of the Maldives in Singapore from October 2016, when the Maldives left the Commonwealth of Nations, to February 2020. It was called "Embassy of the Maldives in Singapore''.

On 1 February 2020, when the Maldives returned to its status as a Commonwealth Republic, the overseas mission reverted to the Office of the High Commission of the Maldives.

=== Former ambassadors ===
Former ambassadors
Ambassador	Time in office	Type of ambassador	Ref	Notes
Ibrahim Shaheed Zaki	30 March 2007 – 1 May 2007	Non-Resident		First non-resident ambassador
Hassan Sobir	29 November 2007 – 24 November 2008	Resident		First resident ambassador
Mohamed Khaleel	19 November 2009 – 2014	Resident		
Fathimath Inaya	29 January 2015 – 2017	Non-Resident		Unconfirmed date in late March
Hamdun Abdulla	30 March 2017 – 2018	Non-Resident		
Dr. Abdulla Mausoom	18 February 2019 – 6 August 2020	Resident		Resigned to become Tourism Minister
Ibrahim Shaheeb	19 January 2021 – 2022	Resident		
Ahmed Thasmeen Ali	25 August 2022 – 26 December 2023	Resident		

== Related ==
- Maldives–Singapore relations
