= Maldives–United Arab Emirates relations =

- Maldives: United Arab Emirates

Diplomatic mission
- Embassy of the Maldives, Abu Dhabi: Embassy of the United Arab Emirates, Malé

Envoy
- Ambassador: Ambassador

Maldives–United Arab Emirates relations are the bilateral relations between the United Arab Emirates and the Maldives.

== History ==
Bilateral relations between the two countries started on 15 March 1978. Ever since then, the two countries has signed many Memorandum of understandings on food security, exemption of Entry Visas for holders of Diplomatic Passports, etc.

== Joint International organizations ==
The UAE and the Maldives share a membership in a group of International organizations. Including:

Organization name	Date of accession of the UAE	Date of accession of the Maldives
International Development Association	23 December 1981	13 January 1978
UNESCO	20 April 1972	18 July 1980
Multilateral Investment Guarantee Agency	20 October 1993	19 May 2005
United Nations	9 December 1971	21 September 1965
Universal Postal Union	30 March 1973	15 August 1967
International Bank for Reconstruction and Development	22 September 1972	13 January 1978
Organization of Islamic Cooperation	2 December 1972	26 July 1976
Organisation for the Prohibition of Chemical Weapons	2 February 1993	1 October 1993
International Finance Corporation	30 September 1977	2 February 1983
International Telecommunication Union	27 June 1972	28 February 1967
World Trade Organization	10 April 1996	31 May 1995
Interpol	2 October 1973	4 September 1984

== Diplomatic missions ==
Maldives has an embassy in Abu Dhabi in the United Arab Emirates.

United Arab Emirates has an embassy in Malé, Maldives.
