= Maldives and the World Bank =

The Maldives and the World Bank have been connected since 1978. Between the inception of the partnership and 2019, the Maldives, a South Asia country, has garnered $295 million in support spread throughout 32 projects. Most projects have focused on the improvement and expansion of health and education programs in the country. Over the course of the partnership, concerns for the Maldives shifted towards climate change, disaster risk reduction, and environmental sustainability.

== Risks ==
Although the Maldives does not possess a significant amount of land or a large population, there are still many areas that need attention to ensure the safety of citizens and tourists, and the efficiency of the economy.

=== Terrorism ===
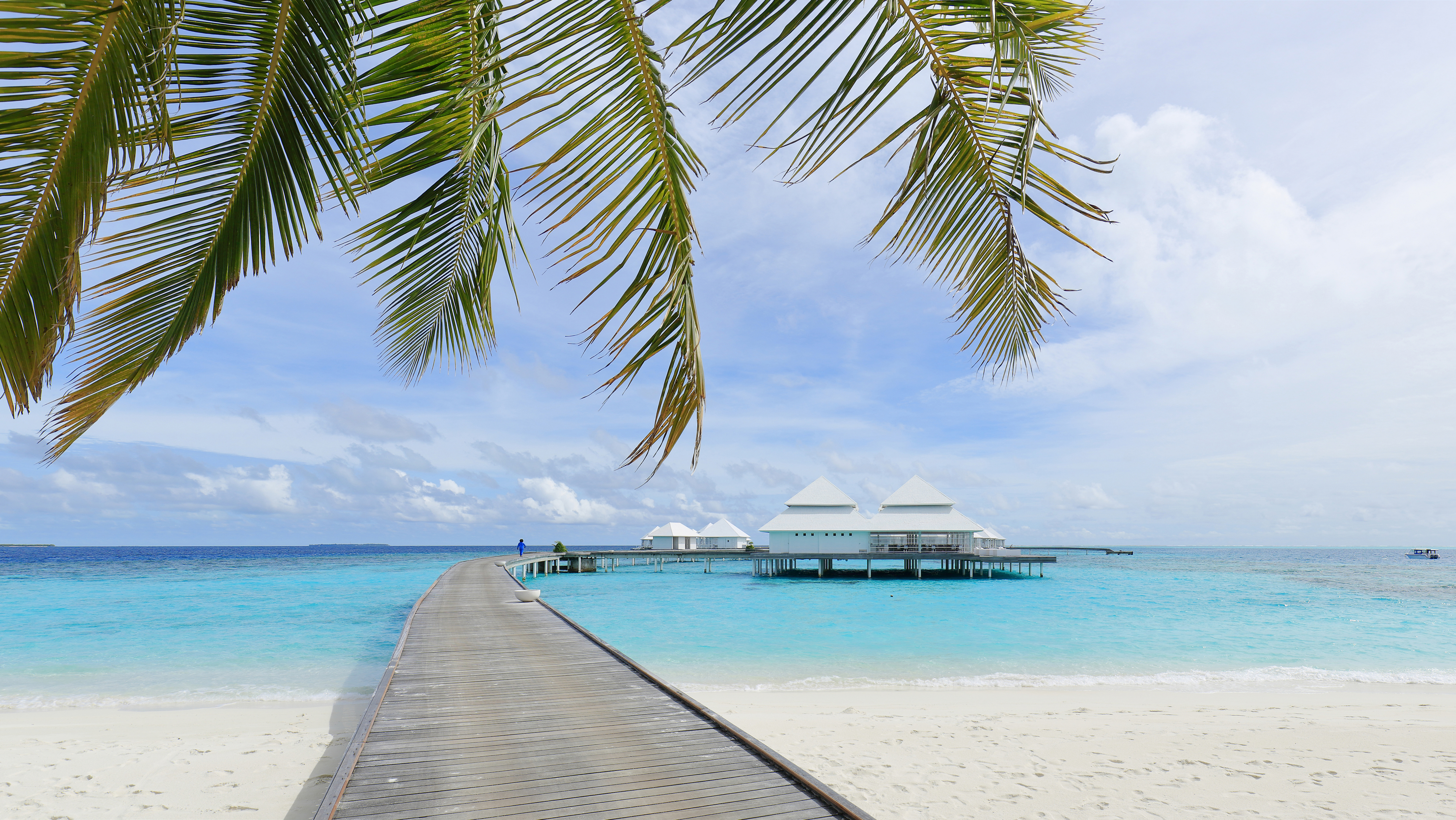
Maldives Water Villas

The Maldives are a popular vacation spot for couples, families, and anyone looking for a tropical getaway. Tourism is the largest source of revenue for the country. Most tourists are naive to the threat of terrorism in the country due to the rise of authoritarianism, religious conflicts, and domestic conflicts. The resort based islands tend to be safe areas for tourists, but rising terrorism concerns can have severe effects on the Maldives Economy as it is heavily influenced by tourism.

=== Natural Disasters ===
Natural disasters also pose a risk for infrastructure, human safety, and tourism in the Maldives. The 2004 Indian Ocean earthquake and tsunami is a prime example of this risk and the effects it can have on the country. The World Bank was a significant player in reconstruction and protection against natural disasters after this catastrophe. The Post Tsunami Relief and Reconstruction Project in 2005 provided $14 million to help the Maldives' rehabilitation efforts.

=== Climate Change ===
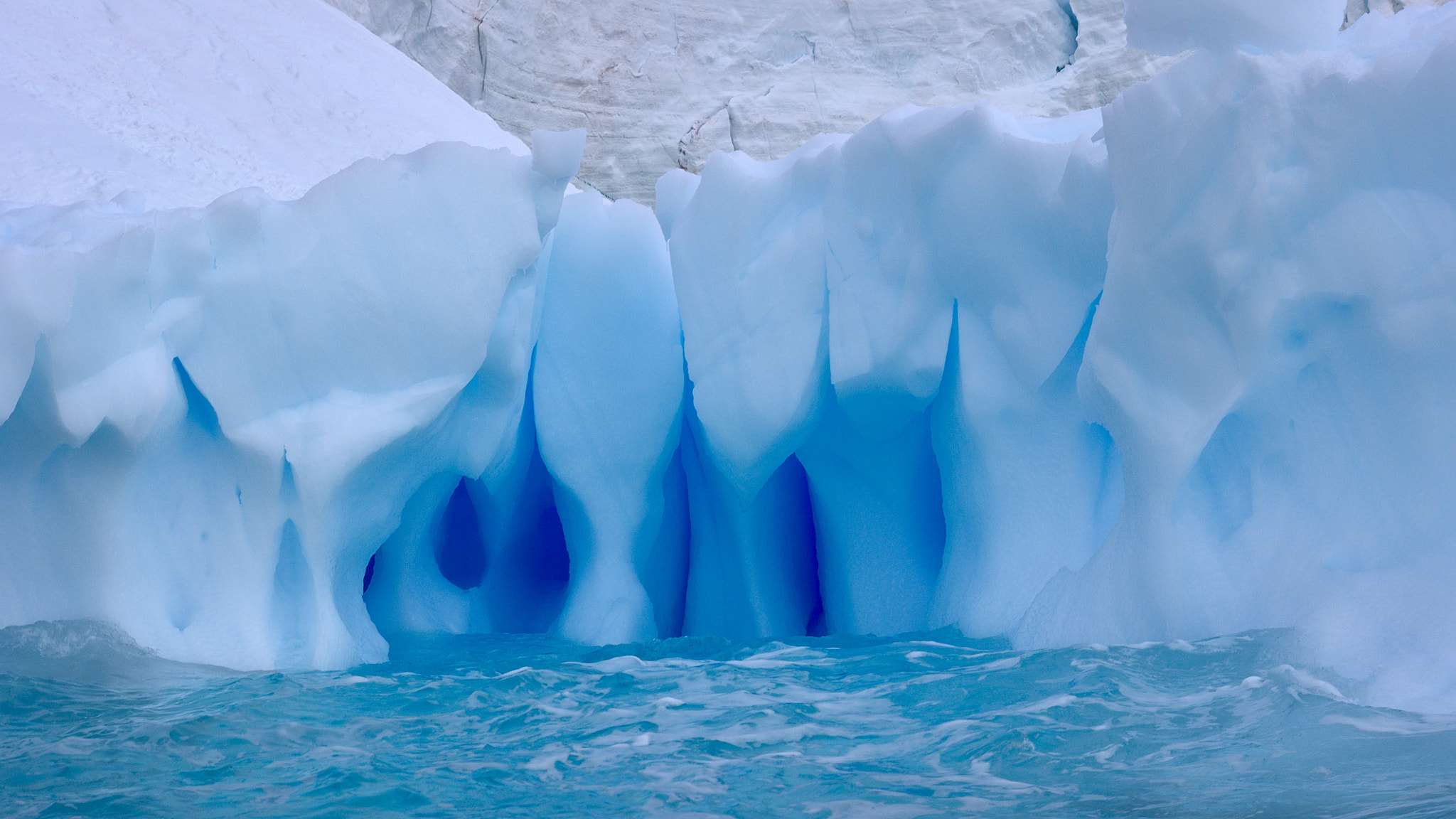
Melting Glacier

The Maldives are made up of around 1,200 islands, of which only 200 are inhabited by humans. This makes the country highly susceptible to global warming effects such as rising sea levels. Many World Bank projects have focused on this threat including the Maldives Environmental management Project (2008), Sustainable Fisheries Resource Development Project (2017), and Maldives Clean Environment Project (2017). Climate change issues pose unique and vital problems for the Maldives which need to be acknowledged. Recent World Bank projects have displayed efforts to properly attend to these matters.

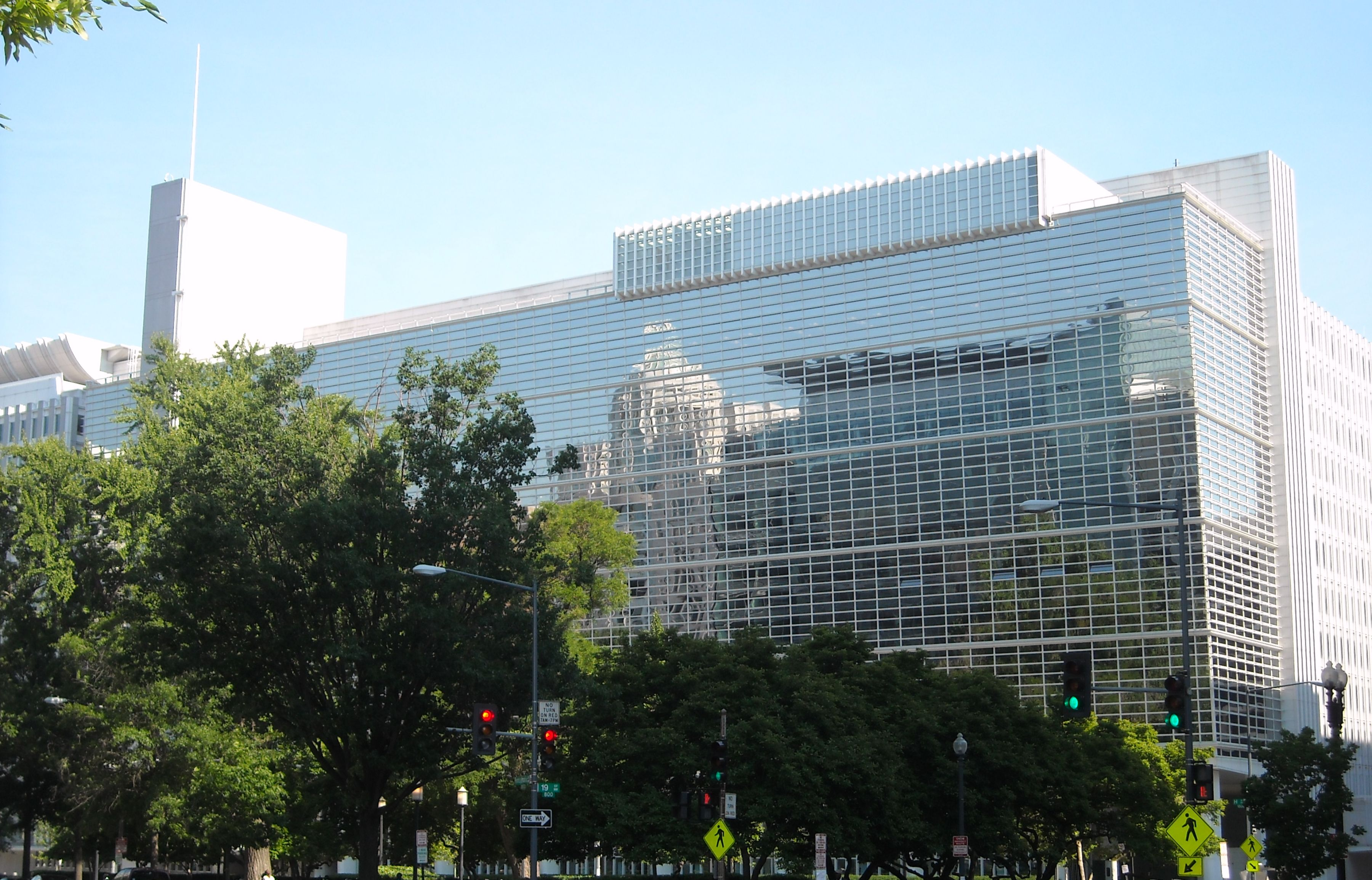
World Bank HQ

== World Bank Projects ==
The Maldives has participated in 32 projects with the World Bank. Historically the World Bank assisted in carrying out projects to promote tourism, improve education, and develop the private sector. The focus for projects in the region has shifted over time as the political climate changes and new problems arise. Currently the World Bank strategy for assistance in the Maldives revolves around three core objectives: promoting economic opportunities, building resilience to climate change, and strengthening fiscal sustainability. The most recent World Bank project in the Maldives, approved on July 1, 2019, involves increasing budget capability, strengthening policy framework, and preventing harmful effects of natural disasters and climate change.

=== Significant Projects ===
This table displays a list of the most important projects that have previously taken place, or are currently active in the Maldives ranging from commitments of $13.15 million to $20 million.

Significant World Bank Projects in the Maldives
Project	Approval Date	Commitment Amount in US Dollars	Objectives
Third Education and Training Project	March 16, 2000	$17.60 million	Improve quality, access, and capacity of education
Post Tsunami Emergency Relief and Reconstruction Project	March 15, 2005	$14 million	Support rehabilitation and reconstruction from damages suffered by 2004 Indian Ocean Tsunami
Maldives Environmental Management Project	June 10, 2008	$13.15 million	Decrease environmental threats
Development Policy Credit	March 4, 2010	$13.7 million	Support economic stabilization and recovery
Sustainable Fisheries Resources Development Project	April 11, 2017	$18 million	Improve management of fisheries in the region
Maldives Clean Environment Project	June 23, 2017	$17.5 million	Improve solid waste management
Enhancing Employability and Resilience of Youth Project	June 14, 2019	$20 million	Improve skills and promote employment among the youth
Maldives First Fiscal Sustainability and Budget Credibility Development Policy Financing Operation	July 1, 2019	$20 million	Improve policy framework to enhance sustainability of public finances and budget credibility

== Results ==
During the 1980s and 1990s the World Bank successfully helped boost the Maldives economy by implementing projects to increase tourism. The World Bank has also played a significant role in assisting the Maldives to increase foreign trade and speed up development. The long-term results of more recent projects remain unknown, but the short-term results look promising. There has been increased attention towards the growing concern of environmental concerns on these islands. Additionally the Maldives has seen a reduction in the fiscal deficit, thanks to the Ministry of Finance, and more sustainability projects. New projects are expected to be introduced in the coming years as the partnership between the World Bank and the Maldives continues to thrive.
