= High Commission of the Maldives, Islamabad =

Diplomatic mission of the Maldives in Islamabad, Pakistan

- Location: Pakistan
- Address: House # 27-A, Street # 2, Sector F 8/3, Islamabad, Pakistan
- High Commissioner: Farzana Zahir

The High Commission of the Maldives, Islamabad (Dhivehi: ޕާކިސްތާނުގައި ހުންނަ ދިވެހިރާއްޖޭގެ ހައިކޮމިޝަން, Urdu: پاکستان میں مالدیپ ہائی کمیشن, also known as the High Commission of the Maldives in Pakistan) is the overseas diplomatic mission (high commission) of the Republic of Maldives in Islamabad, the capital of the Islamic Republic of Pakistan.

== History ==
Diplomatic relations between Pakistan and the Maldives were established on 26 July 1965. Adam Hassan was the first permanent High Commissioner on 3 June 2008.

When the Maldives left the Commonwealth of Nations in October 2016, the High Commission was changed to the Embassy of the Maldives, Islamabad (Dhivehi: ޕާކިސްތާނުގައި ހުންނަ ދިވެހިރާއްޖޭގެ އެމްބަސީ, Urdu: پاکستان میں مالدیپ سفارت خانے, also known as the Embassy of the Maldives in Pakistan). On 1 February 2020, when the Maldives returned and once again became a Commonwealth Republic, the Embassy was reverted to the High Commission.

== Location ==
House # 27-A, Street # 2, Sector F 8/3, Islamabad, Pakistan

== See also ==
- High Commission of Pakistan, Malé
- Maldives–Pakistan relations
