= Jameela Ali Khalid =

Maldivian diplomat

- ޖަމީލާ އަލީ ޚާލިދު
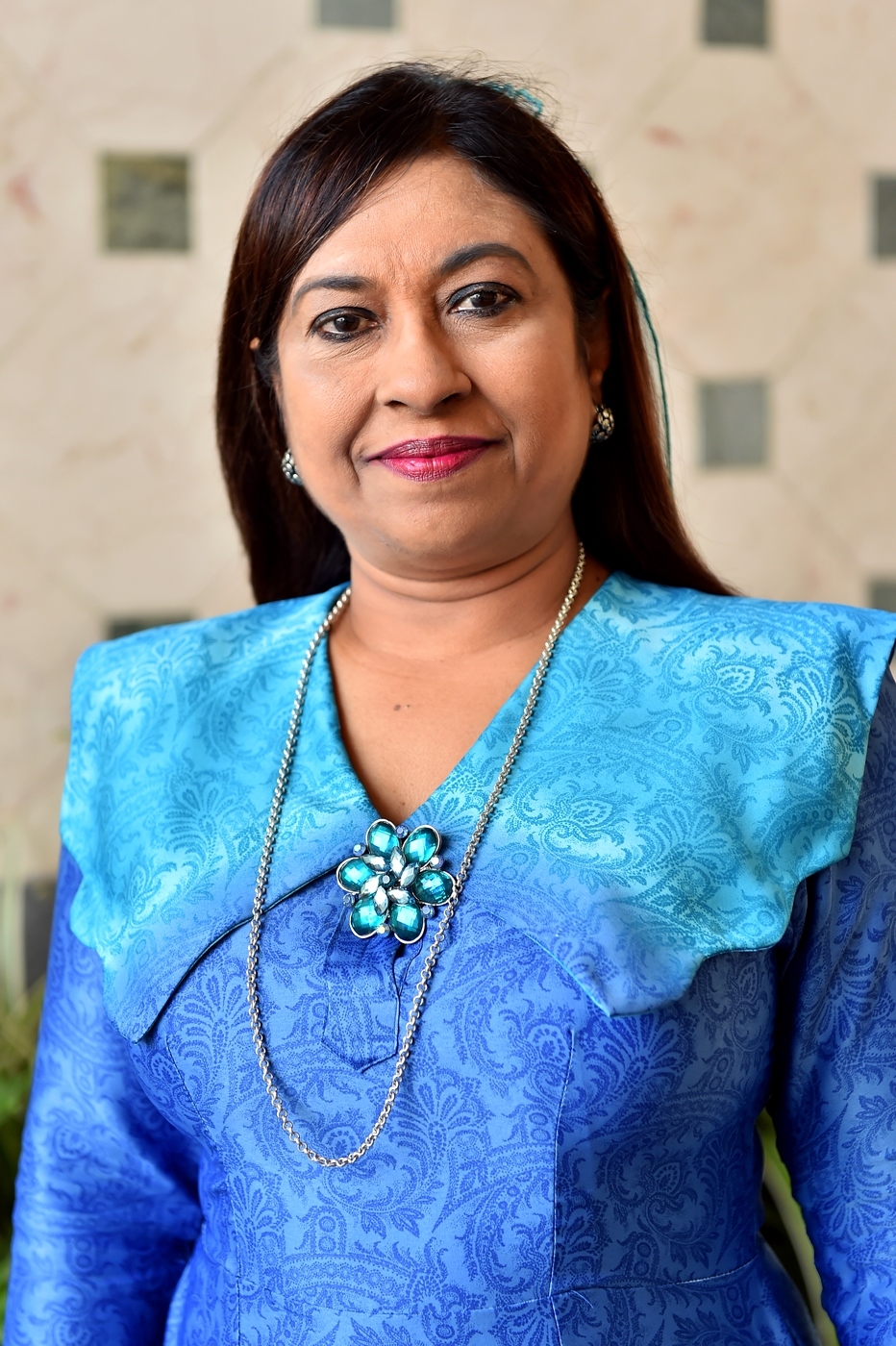
- Khalid in 2016

Ambassador of the Republic of Maldives to Germany
- In office 9 March 2017 – 20 January 2019
- President: Abdulla Yameen; Ibrahim Mohamed Solih

Vice President of the Civil Service Commission
- In office 24 August 2015 – 19 December 2016
- President: Abdulla Yameen

Personal details
- Party: Progressive Party of Maldives

Jameela Ali Khalid (Dhivehi: ޖަމީލާ އަލީ ޚާލިދު) is a Maldivian civil servant, diplomat and politician. She served as the first resident Ambassador of the Republic of Maldives to Germany from 2017 to 2019. She also worked at the Maldives' Civil Service Commission from 2015 to 2016.

== Biography ==
Khalid is a Maldivian diplomat. In May 2012, Khalid was appointed to the Maldivian Civil Service Commission (CSC) by President Mohamed Waheed Hassan, taking the oath of membership administered by Supreme Court Judge Abdulla Areef.

In 2015, Khalid chaired the fourth Committee on Civil and Political Rights of the Kingdom of Bahrain's National Institute for Human Rights.

In March 2017, Khalid was appointed as the first resident Ambassador of the Republic of Maldives to Germany, after nomination by President Abdulla Yameen in October 2016. She presented her credentials to the President of Germany Joachim Gauck on 9 March 2017.

During her tenure as ambassador, Khalid promoted the Maldives as a tourist destination for Germans, launching the Pick Maldives Picture Storybook and the Maldives Association of Travel Agents and Tour Operators (MATATO)'s magazine. She also discussed adding German to the international language options taught at Maldivian schools, in order to support careers in hospitality and tourism.

In 2019, Khalid ran as a Progressive Party of Maldives (PPM) candidate for the North Machangolhi seat in the 2019 Maldivian parliamentary elections. She ran against Ahmed Faris Maumoon, Mohamed Rasheed and Adam Manik.

In 2022, Khalid was elected to a reserved women's seat on the council of the PPM.
