= List of diplomatic missions in the Maldives =

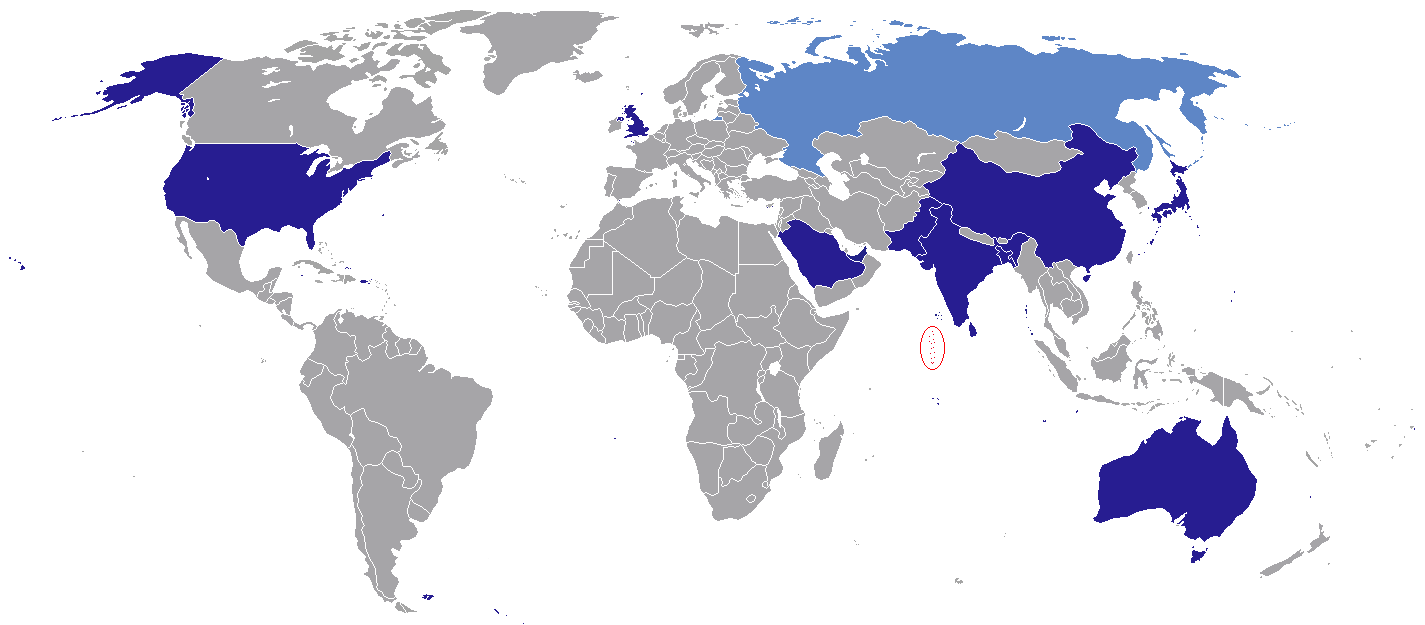
Diplomatic missions in Maldives

This article lists diplomatic missions resident in Maldives. The capital, Malé, hosts 11 embassies/high commissions. Several other countries have accredited ambassadors resident in other capitals or major cities in the region.

Honorary consulates are omitted from this listing.

== Embassies and High Commissions in Malé ==
1. Australia
2. Bangladesh
3. China
4. India
5. Japan
6. Pakistan
7. Saudi Arabia
8. Sri Lanka
9. United Arab Emirates
10. United Kingdom
11. United States

== Consulate-General in Malé ==
- Russia

== Non-resident embassies and high commissions ==
=== Resident in Colombo, Sri Lanka ===
1. Afghanistan
2. Brazil
3. Canada
4. Cuba
5. Egypt
6. European Union
7. France
8. Germany
9. Indonesia
10. Iraq
11. Italy
12. Kuwait
13. Malaysia
14. Myanmar
15. Nepal
16. Netherlands
17. New Zealand
18. Oman
19. Russia
20. South Africa
21. South Korea
22. Switzerland
23. Thailand
24. Vietnam

=== Resident in Islamabad, Pakistan ===
1. Jordan
2. Nigeria
3. Yemen

=== Resident in New Delhi, India ===
1. Algeria
2. Angola
3. Argentina
4. Austria
5. Azerbaijan
6. Bahrain
7. Belgium
8. Cambodia
9. Chile
10. Colombia
11. Cyprus
12. Czech Republic
13. Denmark
14. El Salvador
15. Equatorial Guinea
16. Eritrea
17. Fiji
18. Finland
19. Georgia
20. Ghana
21. Greece
22. Guinea
23. Hungary
24. Kazakhstan
25. Kenya
26. Laos
27. Libya
28. Madagascar
29. Malawi
30. Malta
31. Mauritius
32. Mexico
33. Mongolia
34. Morocco
35. Namibia
36. North Korea
37. Norway
38. Peru
39. Poland
40. Portugal
41. Romania
42. Rwanda
43. Serbia
44. Seychelles
45. Slovakia
46. Slovenia
47. Somalia
48. Spain
49. Sudan
50. Sweden
51. Tunisia
52. Uganda
53. Ukraine
54. Uruguay
55. Zambia
56. Zimbabwe

=== Resident elsewhere ===
1. Bhutan (Dhaka)
2. Brunei (Singapore)
3. Palestine (Kuala Lumpur)
4. Philippines (Dhaka)
5. Singapore (Singapore)

== See also ==
- Foreign relations of the Maldives
