= List of ambassadors of the Maldives =

Foreign policy post in the Maldives

The ambassadors of the Maldives are appointed by the president of the Maldives to maintain relations between countries, and to develop foreign policy toward various organizations and countries. The ambassador is appointed by the President of the Maldives with the approval of the People's Majlis.

== Ambassadors to countries ==
Host country	List	Ambassador/High Commissioner	Appointment	Ref
United Arab Emirates	–	Thoriq Ibrahim	25 June 2026	
United Kingdom	–	Vacant	–	
China	List	Fazeel Najeeb	7 May 2024	
Japan	–	Ahmed Mahloof	4 December 2025	
Germany	–	Aishath Shaan Shakir	20 July 2022	
India	List	Aishath Azeema	30 October 2024	
United States	–	Abdul Ghafoor Mohamed	15 September 2022	
Malaysia	List	Mariyam Shabeena Ahmed	7 May 2024	
Sri Lanka	–	Masood Imad	7 May 2024	
Singapore	–	Mohamed Luveiz	7 May 2024	
Bangladesh	–	Shiuneen Rasheed	3 July 2024	
Turkey	–	Lieutenant General (Rtd) Abdul Raheem Abdul Latheef	3 July 2024	
Pakistan	–	Mohamed Thoha	3 July 2024	
Belgium	–	Fathimath Dhiyana Saeed	3 August 2026	
Saudi Arabia	–	Ahmed Sareer	30 October 2024	
Thailand	–	Fuwad Thowfeek	16 December 2024	
Qatar	–	Adam Shareef Umar	25 June 2026	

== Ambassadors to international organizations ==
Host organization	List	Ambassador	Appointment	Ref
United Nations	List	Ali Naseer Mohamed	7 May 2024	
European Union	–	Fathimath Dhiyana Saeed	3 August 2026	
United Nations Office at Geneva	–	Salma Rasheed	7 May 2024	
