= China–Maldives relations =

- China: Maldives

Diplomatic mission
- Embassy of China, Malé: Embassy of the Maldives, Beijing

Envoy
- Her Excellency Ambassador Wang Lixin: Ambassador Fazeel Najeeb

Diplomatic relations between the People's Republic of China and the Maldives were established in 1972. China has an embassy in Malé which opened in November 2011, and the Maldives has an embassy in Beijing which opened in 2009. Approximately 70 percent of the Maldives' total debt is attributed to Chinese projects, with an annual payment of US$92 million to China, constituting around 10 percent of the country's entire budget. China has become pervasive in the Maldives, exerting influence over infrastructure, trade, and energy sectors.

China-Maldives ties improved with the election of Mohamed Muizzu as president in 2023. Likewise, relations between the Maldives and India deteriorated, with relations hitting a new low after an incident involving the Indian Coast Guard boarding three Maldivian fishing boats within the Maldives's Exclusive Economic Zone. On March 5, 2024, the Maldives and China signed a bilateral military pact in a further sign of warmer Sino-Maldivian ties vis-a-vis worsening Indo-Maldivian ties. President Mohamed Muizzu considers his country's relationship with Beijing as one of the Maldives' closest 'allies and developmental partners' in the region.

== History ==
The relations between China and the Maldives date back hundreds of years. A record from the Tang dynasty documents a visiting Maldivian delegation bearing gifts from King Baladitiya to Emperor Gaozong in 658 AD, and repeatedly in 662 AD. The Maldives are referred to as "Mo-lai". The Chinese explorer Zheng He visited the islands in 1412 and 1417 AD.

The Maldives has historically been aligned with India since its independence in 1965 but has increasingly engaged with China. Maldives joined China's Belt and Road Initiative in 2017.

Maldives strongly supported China's 2007 application to join the South Asian Association for Regional Cooperation (SAARC) as an observer. In November 2011, China opened an embassy in Malé.

In 2013, Maldives and China upgraded their relationship to a strategic partnership.

In July 2022, the Chinese embassy in the capital city Malé received a bomb threat, sent via the city's website, that also targeted a Russian consulate. Security forces were dispatched to the affected areas and the residence of politician Mohamed Nasheed, and some streets were cordoned off.

In 2024, China and Maldives signed a memorandum of understanding which incorporated blue economy cooperation. China and the Maldives reached a bilateral military agreement on March 5, 2024. The impact was regarded by analysts, as significantly affecting the geo-security environment of India.

On April 21, 2024, the pro-China People's National Congress led by President Muizzu won a landslide victory in the parliamentary election with 71 of the 93 seats in the People's Majlis, the unicameral parliament of the Maldives.

The Chinese research vessel Xiang Yang Hong 03 arrived at Male seaport on 8/2/2024. The survey ship has the capability to conduct civilian research as well as military surveillance, and is strategically positioned in the Indian Ocean Region (IOR).

== High level visits ==
In 1999, the People's Liberation Army chief of staff visited Malé, and Chinese Premier Zhu Rongji visited in 2001. In 2002, the Maldives Minister of Defense and National Security visited China. In 2010, President Mohamed Nasheed made a state visit to China.

In May 2011, Wu Bangguo, the Chairman of Chinese National People's Congress and member of the CCP Politburo Standing Committee, visited the Maldives. In September 2012, President Mohamed Waheed Hassan Manik met Premier Wen Jiabao in China.

In October 2012, Li Changchun, member of the CCP Politburo Standing Committee, visited the Maldivian President Mohamed Waheed Hassan. Li said "China will continue to provide assistance to its capacity to help promote the Maldivian social and economic growth and support the country's infrastructure and human resource development".

In December 2012, the Maldives Minister of Defense and National Security visited China. In September 2014, President Abdulla Yameen traveled to China, and during the next month Xi Jinping, President and the General Secretary of the Chinese Communist Party, visited Yameen.

In August 2017 three Chinese navy warships made a port call to Malé. In December 2017, in China, President Yameen signed a free trade agreement with China; notably this was the Maldives' first free trade agreement.

The Maldives has significantly strengthened its relationship with China, underscored by President Mohamed Muizzu's inaugural state visit to China in January 2024, where he signed twenty new agreements including financial and military assistance. Mohamed Muizzu became the first president to visit China on January 10, 2024. During the state visit, the two countries agreed to develop an "Action Plan" for establishing a comprehensive strategic cooperation partnership between China and Maldives from 2024 to 2028. Additionally, the two governments agreed to sign 20 MoUs. Mohamed Muizzu referred to China as a valued ally during the visit.

== Economic relations ==
In 2017, Maldives joined the Belt and Road Initiative (BRI).

Following the defeat of Abdulla Yameen in the September 2018 presidential election, the government of Ibrahim Mohamed Solih raised concerns about the level of Chinese debt incurred by Yameen's government. In December 2019, the then-Speaker of the People's Majlis and former president Mohamed Nasheed labelled debts incurred to build projects such as the Sinamalé Bridge, part of a debt-trap. Former Maldivian officials and Chinese representatives criticized Nasheed's lack of detailed accounting, and worried that the amount was still a large amount for the islands.

China's enduring economic partnership with the Maldives for over a decade has remained robust, positioning Beijing well to steadily pursue its strategic goals in Male.

As of 2024, the Maldives already owes US$1.3 billion to China, which represents the largest percentage of its debt.

On January 1, 2025, the China-Maldives Free Trade Agreement officially came into effect.

== Infrastructure cooperation ==
Under President Mohamed Nasheed, Beijing financed a housing complex in Hulhumalé, "the largest civilian housing project in the history of the country and the first commercial project undertaken by the Chinese in the Maldives". The upgrade of Malé International Airport was awarded to China after the eviction of Indian contractors.

Large infrastructure projects facilitated by Chinese investment, including the China-Maldives Friendship Bridge, are a significant aspect of the cooperation between China and the Maldives.

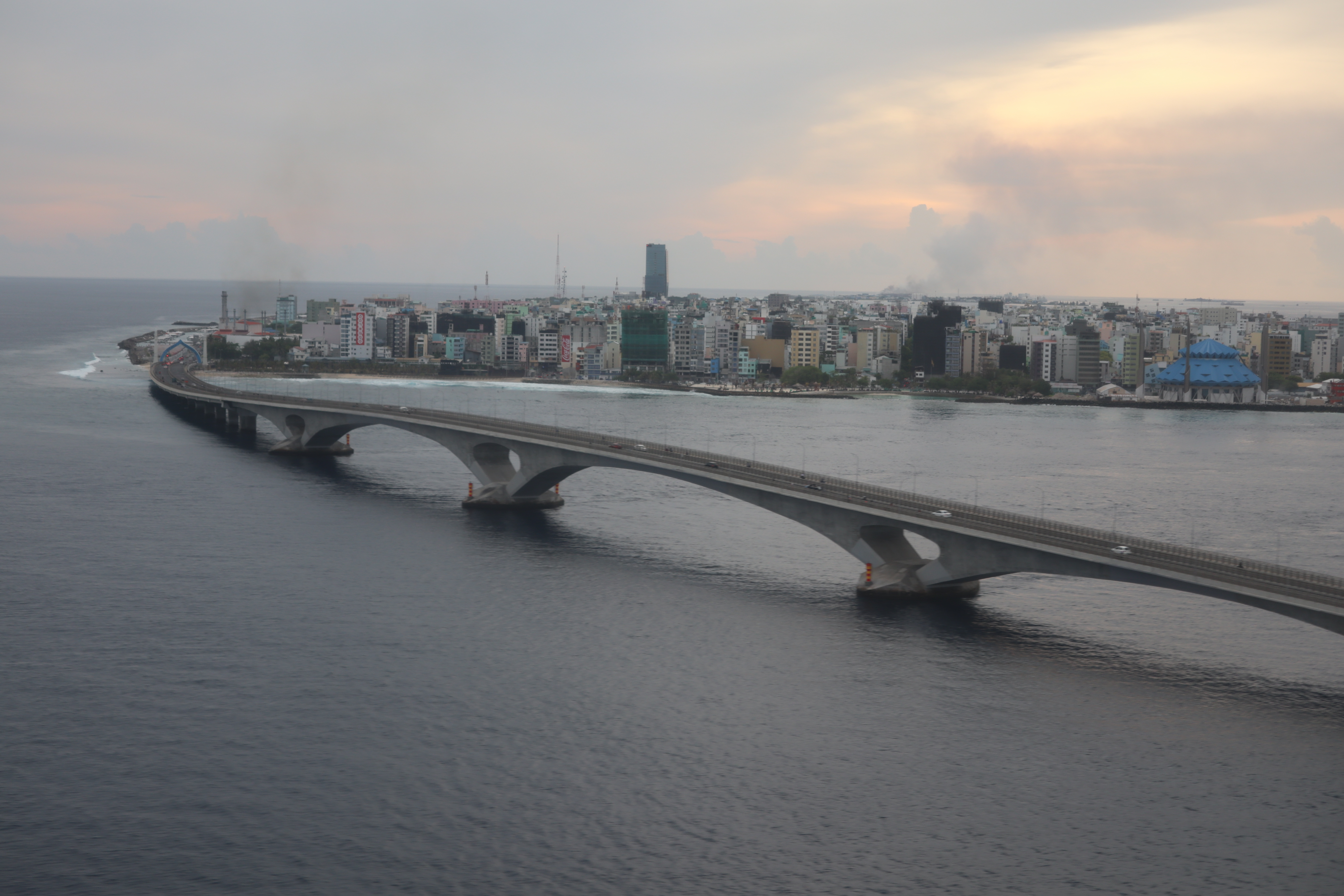
An aerial view of the Sinamalé Bridge, from above of the Hulhulé Island. Originally called the China-Maldives Friendship Bridge.

By 2014, Chinese investments in the Maldives included the Malé-Hulhule Bridge, a Maldives Ministry of Foreign Affairs building, a national museum, housing projects, and investments in sectors such as renewable energy, tourism, and telecommunications. Beijing's initiatives gained greater momentum during the presidency of Abdulla Yameen Abdul Gayoom, who assumed office in 2013 and exhibited a notable receptiveness to Beijing's trade initiatives.

The Export-Import Bank of China has provided more than $1 billion to the Maldives for upgrading an airport, a new bridge, and relocating Maldives's port.

== Tourism ==
363,000 Chinese tourists visited Maldives in 2014. In 2018 and 2019 there was a gradual decrease in Chinese tourists.

On February 17, 2023, the Agreement between the Government of the People's Republic of China and the Government of the Republic of Maldives on Mutual Visa Exemption came into effect, allowing holders of valid Chinese ordinary passports and travel documents to enter the Maldives visa-free for 30 days.

== Triangular relations ==
=== Impact on relations with India ===
Following growing Chinese influence in Maldives, India–Maldives relations had soured in a number of areas including defence and security. Successive Indian Governments expressed concern about the growing Chinese influence in the Maldives. China and the Maldives in 2018 were looking to construct a Joint Ocean Observation Station; the Government of India and the Maldivian Democratic Party expressed concerns that it will be used for military applications by China. Media reports later indicated that Maldives might cancel the plans. China is presently vigorously extending its influence in the Indian Ocean. Under the leadership of CCP general secretary Xi Jinping, the Indian Ocean has been designated as the focal point of the Maritime Silk Road (MSR) initiative.

=== Impact on relations with United States ===
The US has a Maldives-focused assistance program within the United States Department of the Treasury to provide "assistance on debt strategy and domestic debt management". The opening of a U.S. embassy in the Maldives in 2023 is a continuation of these strategic efforts.
