= Embassy of the Maldives, Beijing =

Diplomatic mission of the Maldives in Beijing, China

Embassy of the Maldives, Beijing ޗައިނާގައި ހުންނަ ދިވެހިރާއްޖޭގެ އެމްބަސީ 马尔代夫驻华大使馆
- Location: China
- Address: 1-5-31, Jianguomenwai Diplomatic Compound, No. 1, Jianwai Xiushui Street, Chaoyang District, Beijing 100600, People’s Republic of China
- Opened: 26 May 2009
- Ambassador: Fazeel Najeeb
- Website: maldivesembassy.cn/en

The Embassy of the Maldives in the People's Republic of China (Dhivehi: ޗައިނާގައި ހުންނަ ދިވެހިރާއްޖޭގެ އެމްބަސީ, Chinese: 马尔代夫驻华大使馆) is an embassy established by the Maldives in Beijing, the capital of the People's Republic of China.

== History ==
On October 14, 1972, diplomatic relations between China and the Maldives were established. The embassy was opened on May 26, 2009.

== Address ==
1–5–31, Jianguomenwai Diplomatic Compound, No. 1, Jianwai Xiushui Street, Chaoyang District, Beijing 100600, People's Republic of China

== Ambassador ==
Since 7 May 2024, Fazeel Najeeb has been serving as Ambassador of the Maldives to China and was appointed by Maldivian President Mohamed Muizzu.

== Related ==
- Embassy of China in the Maldives
- China–Maldives relations
