= Ahmed Khalil =

Ahmed Khalil or Khaleel may refer to:

- Ahmed Khalil El-Giddawi (1931–2013), Egyptian gymnast
- Ahmed Khaleel (born 1962), Maldivian diplomat
- Ahmad Khaleel (born 1970), Saudi Arabian footballer
- Ahmed Khalil Al-Khaldi (born 1972), Qatari footballer
- Ahmed Khalil (footballer, born 1991), Emirati footballer
- Ahmed Khalil (footballer, born 1994), Tunisian footballer

== See also ==
- Khalil Ahmed (disambiguation)
