= Makunudhoo =

Makunudhoo may refer to the following places in the Maldives:

- Makunudhoo (Haa Dhaalu Atoll)
- Makunudhoo (Kaafu Atoll)
