= Maldives Monetary Authority =

Central bank of Maldives

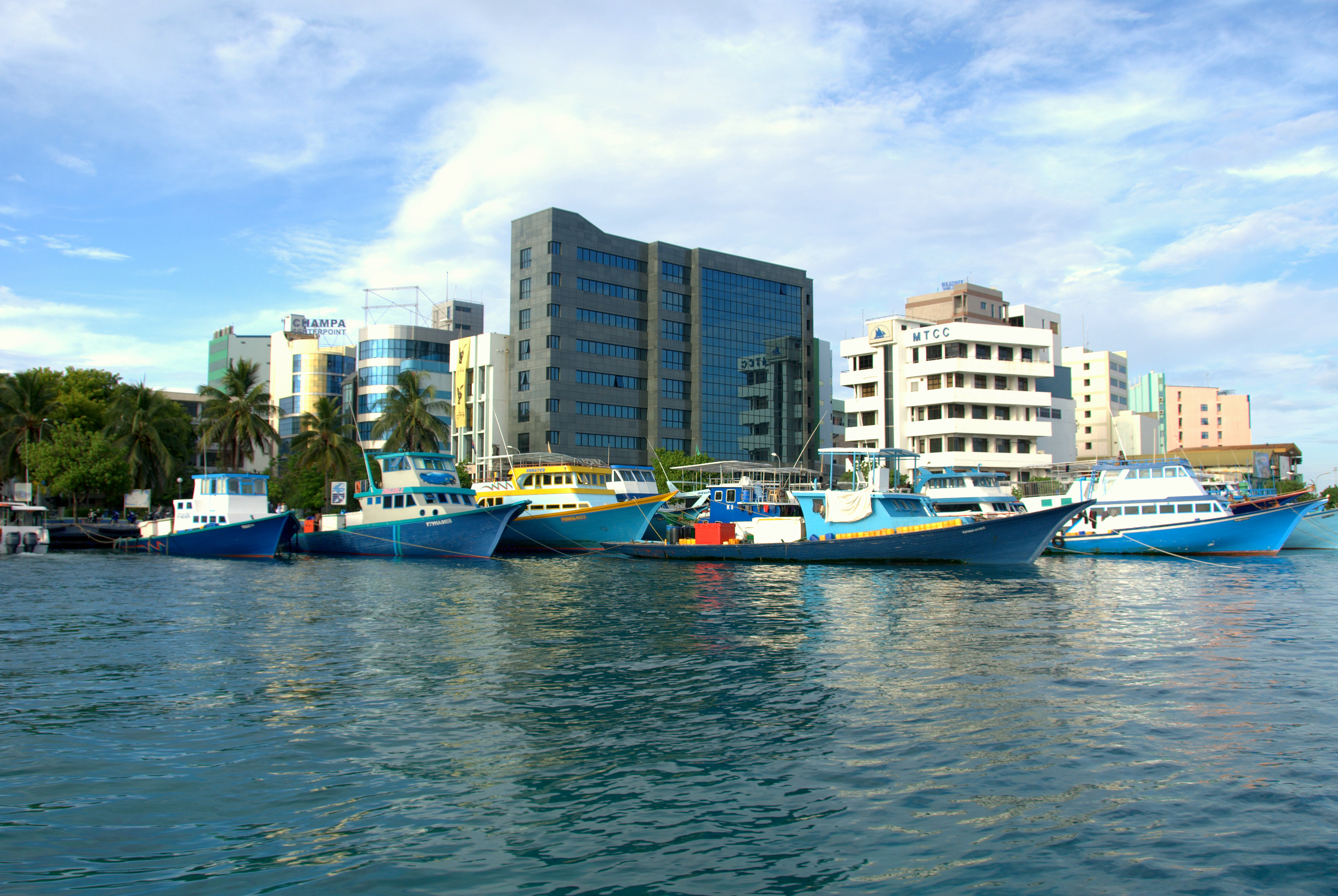
- Central bank of: Maldives
- Headquarters: Malé
- Established: July 1, 1981; 45 years ago
- Ownership: 100% state ownership
- Governor: Ahmed Munawar
- Currency: Maldivian rufiyaa MVR (ISO 4217)
- Reserves: 509 million USD
- Website: mma.gov.mv

The Maldives Monetary Authority (MMA) is the central bank of the republic of Maldives. It is located in the capital city of Malé.

The current governor is Ahmed Munawar and deputy governor is Ahmed Imad. It is a member of the Asian Clearing Union.

== History ==
It was established on 1 July 1981, under the mandate provided by the "“Maldives Monetary Authority Act 1981" (MMA Act).

In April 2007, the MMA Act was amended to provide complete autonomy and independence of the MMA.

== Functions ==
Its primary functions are to issue currency, regulate the availability of Maldivian rufiyaa (MVR), promote its stability, manage licences, supervise and regulate institutions in the financial sector, formulate and implement monetary policy and to advise the government on issues relating to the economy and financial systems.

The MMA is a member of the Alliance for Financial Inclusion and is active in developing financial inclusion policy.

== Governors ==
- Maumoon Abdul Gayoom, July 1981 – August 2004
- Mohamed Jaleel, September 2004 – July 2005
- Qasim Ibrahim, August 2005 – April 2007
- Abdulla Jihad, August 2007 – July 2008
- Fazeel Najeeb, October 2008 – December 2013
- Azeema Adam, April 2014 – August 2017
- Ahmed Naseer, August 2017 – July 2019
- Ali Hashim, 2019 – July 2024

== See also ==
- List of central banks
- List of financial supervisory authorities by country
