= Mohamed Latheef (ambassador) =

Ambassador of the Maldives to the U.N. from 2002 to 2007

Mohamed Latheef NIIV
- މުހައްމަދު ލަތީފް
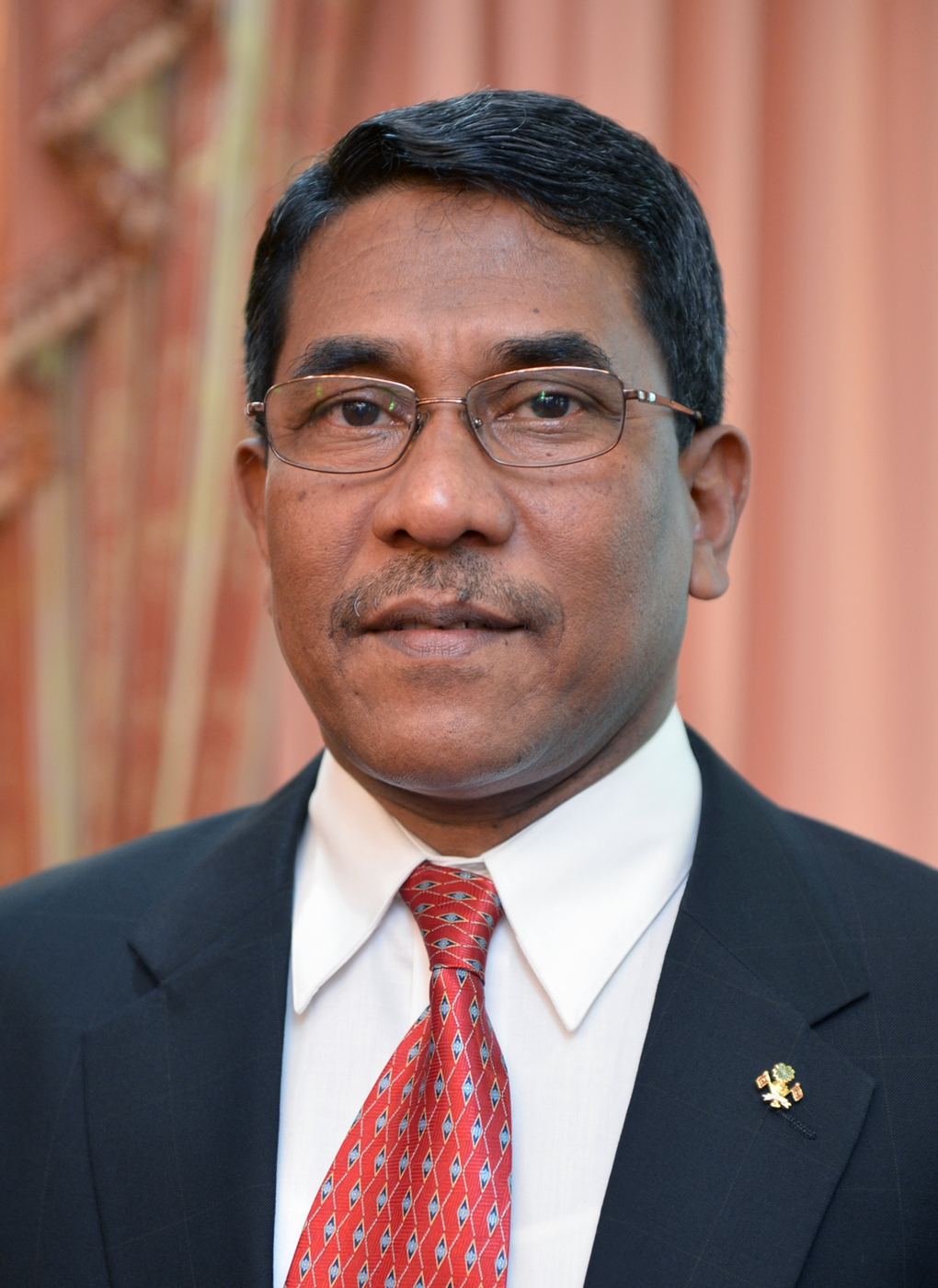
- Latheef in 2013
- Born: July 20, 1953 (age 73)
- Education: University of Wales; Cardiff University
- Occupation: Permanent Representative of the Maldives to the United Nations
- Years active: 2002-2007
- Organization: United Nations
- Predecessor: Hussain Shihab
- Successor: Ahmed Khaleel
- Children: 3

Mohamed Latheef NIIV, (Dhivehi: މުހައްމަދު ލަތީފް; born July 20, 1953) is a former Ambassador Extraordinary and Plenipotentiary Permanent Representative to the United Nations for the Republic of Maldives, based in New York City.

He presented his credentials to the Secretary-General of the United Nations on 11 November 2002. Latheef took over the role, first on a charge d'affaires basis from Hussain Shihab on September 9, 2002. Prior to this, he had been the Ambassador of the Republic of Maldives to the United States.

Latheef was prominent in attempting to encourage member states of the United Nations to provide aid following the effect of the 2004 Indian Ocean earthquake on the Maldives.

== Background ==
Mohamed Latheef holds a doctorate in educational planning and a master's degree in Education from the University of Wales, with postgraduate studies in demography from Cardiff University in Wales.

Prior to becoming an ambassador, Latheef held a number of posts in Maldivian government, including posts at the Educational Development Centre, the Ministry of Education, the Ministry of Foreign Affairs and the Maldivian Embassy in Sri Lanka.

He became deputy speaker, and was appointed a member of the Peoples' Special Assembly in 1979, retaining this post until 1997. Latheef was also the national director of the Project for Public Administration Reform, and director general of the Maldives Centre for Management and Administration, both from 1992 to 1993. Also in 1993, he was made deputy minister of the Ministry of Atolls Administration.

Finally, before moving into a diplomatic post, Latheef served as the minister of education from 1993 until 2002, and served as a member of the Maldives parliament (the Majlis) between 2000 and 2002.

Mohamed Latheef is married, with three children.
