= Embassy of the Maldives, Tokyo =

Diplomatic mission of Maldives in Tokyo, Japan

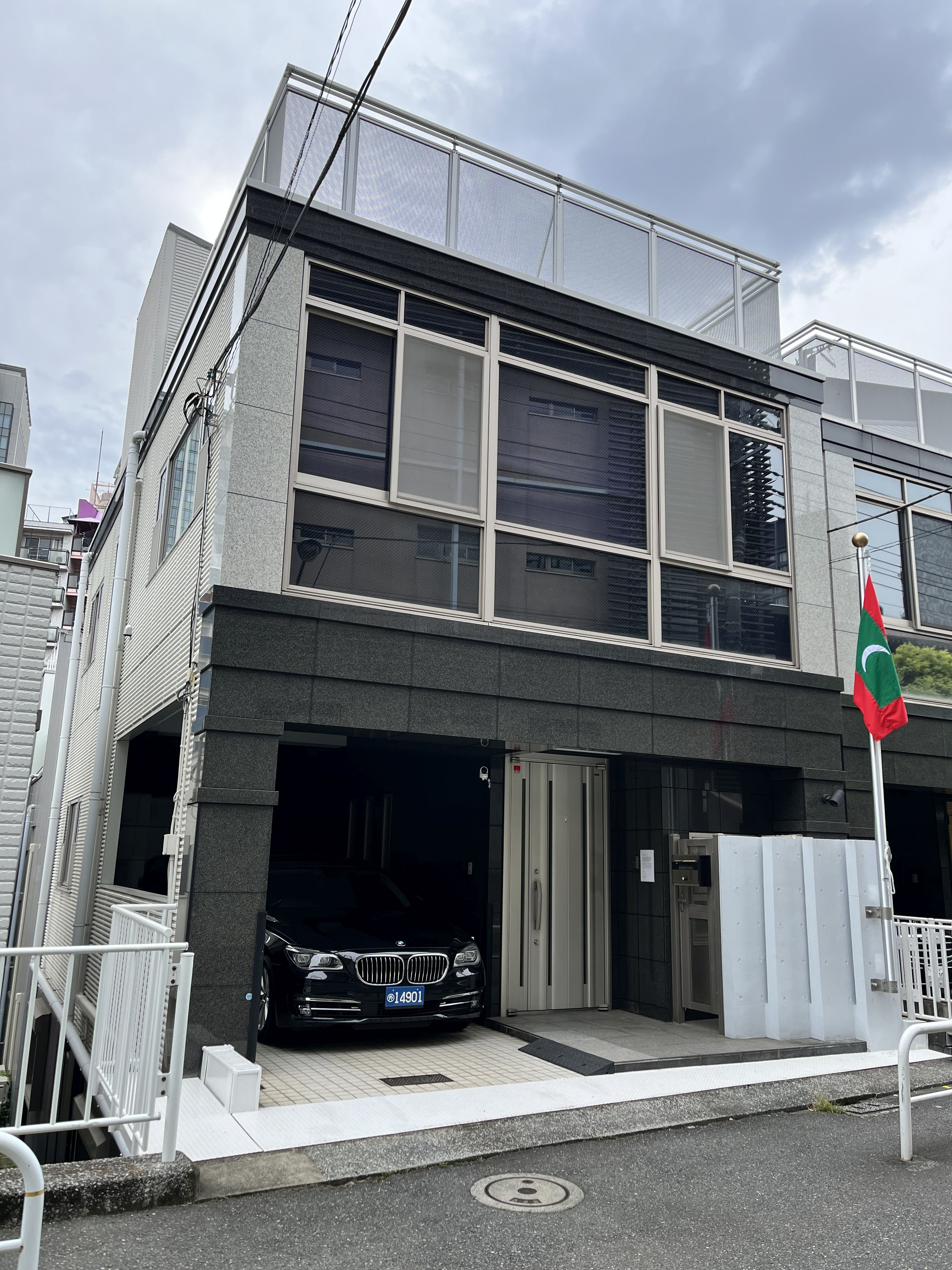
- Location: Japan
- Address: 3-7, Hayabusa-cho, Chiyoda-ku, Tokyo 102-0092, Japan
- Coordinates: 35°39′35.0″N 139°44′33.3″E
- Opened: 10 May 2007
- Chargé d'affaires: Shafraz Rasheed
- Website: jp.mdvmission.gov.mv

The Embassy of Maldives, Tokyo (Dhivehi: ޖަޕާނުގައި ހުންނަ ދިވެހިރާއްޖޭގެ އެމްބަސީ, also known as the Embassy of Maldives in Japan) is the diplomatic mission of the Republic of Maldives in Tokyo, Japan.

The embassy was opened on 10 May 2007, marking the 40th anniversary of diplomatic relations between the two countries. The Chargé d'affaires of the Embassy was Ahmed Khaleel. The first ambassador was Abdul Hameed Zakariyya from 11 March 2008 - 25 June 2009.

== Location ==
3–7, Hayabusa-cho, Chiyoda-ku, Tokyo 102–0092, Japan

== Ambassador ==
Since 7 September 2022, Hassan Sobir has been serving as the Ambassador Extraordinary and Plenipotentiary of the Maldives to Japan. The mission is currently headed by Chargé d'affaires. a.i. Shafraz Rasheed.

Past Ambassadors have produced as ministers of the Maldives. The 3rd ambassador, Mohamed Hussain Shareef served as Minister of Human Resources, Youth and Sports during the presidency of Mohamed Waheed Hassan Manik. The current ambassador, Hassan Sobir, served as Minister of Fisheries and Agriculture, and he served as Minister of Tourism during the presidency of Maumoon Abdul Gayoom.

== See also ==
- Japan–Maldives relations
- Embassy of Japan, Malé
