= Embassy of Japan, Malé =

Diplomatic mission of Japan in Malé, Maldives

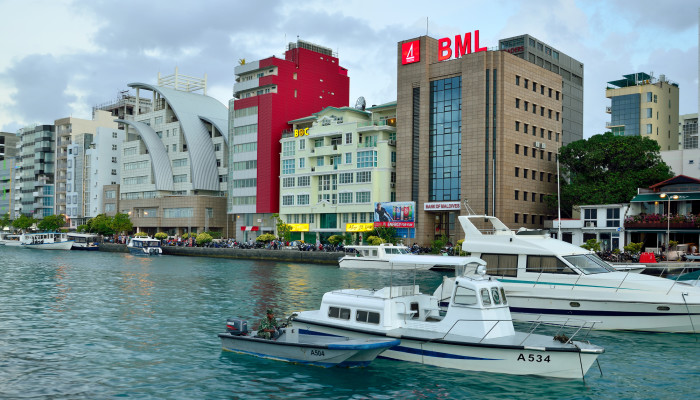

- Location in the Maldives
- Location: Maldives
- Address: 5th and 8th Floor, Aagé Building, 12 Boduthakurufaanu Magu, Henveiru, Malé 20094, Maldives
- Coordinates: 4°10′42.7″N 73°30′49.6″E
- Opened: 1 January 2016
- Ambassador: Takeuchi Midori
- Website: mv.emb-japan.go.jp

The Embassy of Japan, Malé (Dhivehi: ދިވެހިރާއްޖެގައި ޖަޕާނުގެ އެމްބަސީ) is an embassy of Japan in the Republic of Maldives. It was opened on 1 January 2016. It is located on the 5th and 8th Floor, Aagé Building, 12 Boduthakurufaanu Magu, Henveiru, Malé, 20094, Republic of Maldives.

== See also ==
- Japan–Maldives relations
- Embassy of the Maldives, Tokyo
