= Embassy of China, Malé =

Diplomatic mission of China in Malé, Maldives

- Location: Maldives
- Address: H. Nookurikeela, Dhunbugas Magu, Henveiru, Malé
- Opened: 8 November 2011
- Ambassador: Wang Lixin
- Website: mv.china-embassy.gov.cn/eng

The Embassy of China in the Maldives (Chinese: 中华人民共和国驻马尔代夫大使馆, also simply known as the Embassy of China in Maldives) is an embassy established by the People's Republic of China in Malé, the capital of the Maldives.

== History ==
Diplomatic relations between China and the Maldives were established on 14 October 1972. The embassy was opened on November 8, 2011. It was the fifth established embassy in the country after those of India, Sri Lanka, Pakistan and Bangladesh. The embassy opened a few days before the 17th South Asian Association for Regional Cooperation summit in Malé. In 2021, protests in front of the Chinese embassy and bomb threats to the Indian High Commission to the Maldives prompted the government of the Maldives to increase security around the two buildings.

== Location ==
H. Nookurikeela, Dhunbugas Magu, Henveiru, Malé

== Ambassador ==
6 September 2021, Wang Lixin (1972) has been serving as Ambassador Extraordinary and Plenipotentiary.

== See also ==
- Embassy of the Maldives, Beijing
- China–Maldives relations
