= Japan–Maldives relations =

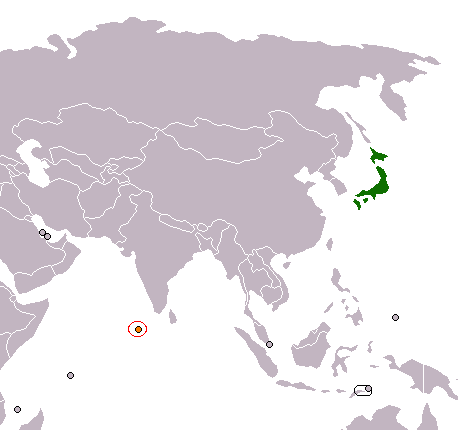
- Japan: Maldives

Diplomatic mission
- Embassy of Japan, Malé: Embassy of the Maldives, Tokyo

Envoy
- Ambassador Rumiko Ishigami: Ambassador Ahmed Mahloof

Japan–Maldives relations are foreign relations between Japan and Maldives. Diplomatic relations were established in 1967.

== History ==
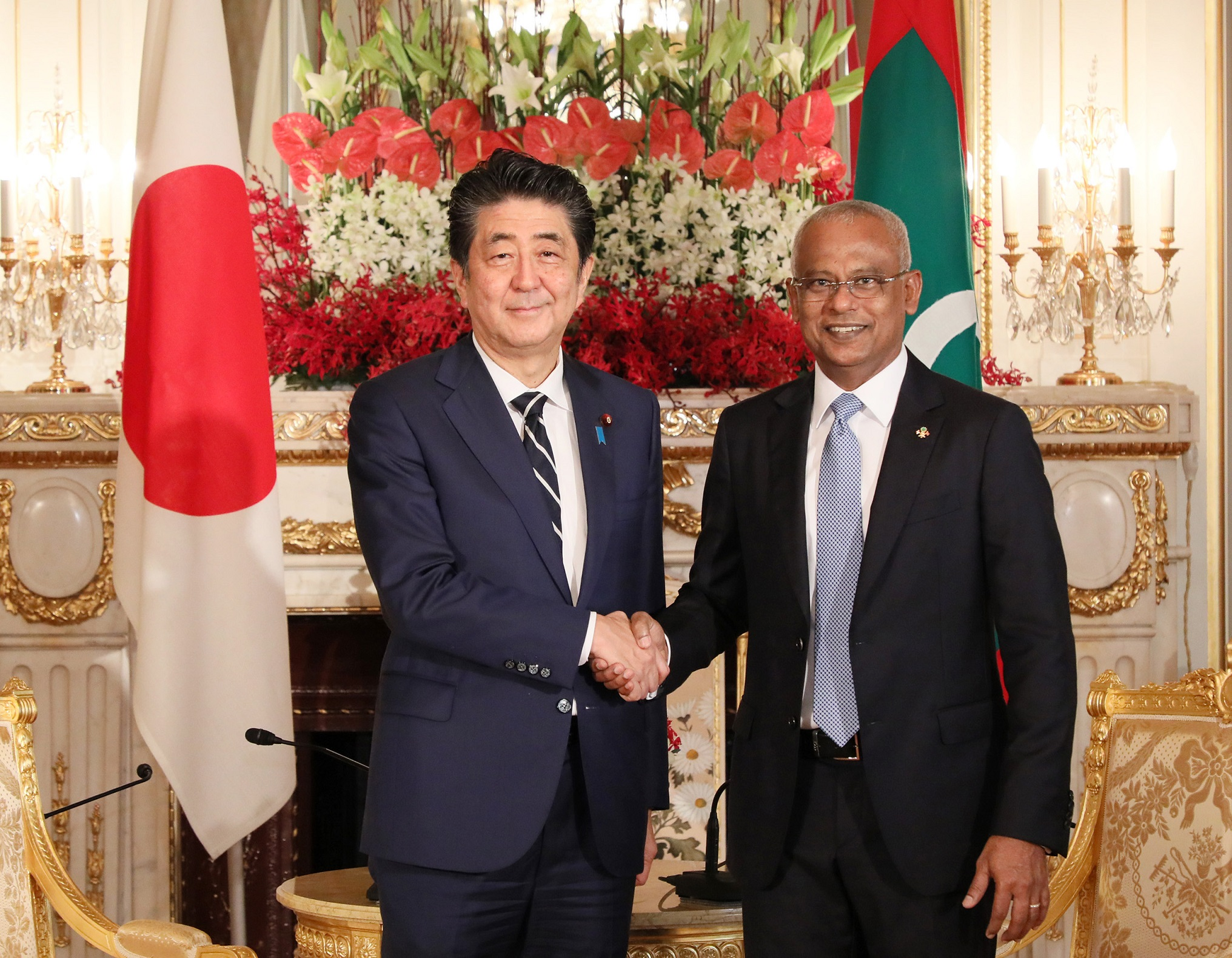
Japanese PM Shinzo Abe (left) and Maldivian President Ibrahim Mohamed Solih at the Akasaka Palace in Tokyo on October 21, 2019.

Maumoon Abdul Gayoom, the former President of Maldives, had visited Japan four times between 1984 and 2001. In 2014 Abdulla Yameen, the former President of Maldives, met with Shinzo Abe, the then Prime Minister of Japan, in Tokyo.
Maldives opened an embassy in Tokyo in 2007. Japan opened an embassy in Malé in 2016.

In October 2019, President Ibrahim Mohamed Solih visited Japan for the enthronement ceremony of Emperor Naruhito. During the visit President Solih met with Shinzo Abe, the then Prime Minister of Japan.

== Anti-tsunami barrier of Japan's ODA Project ==
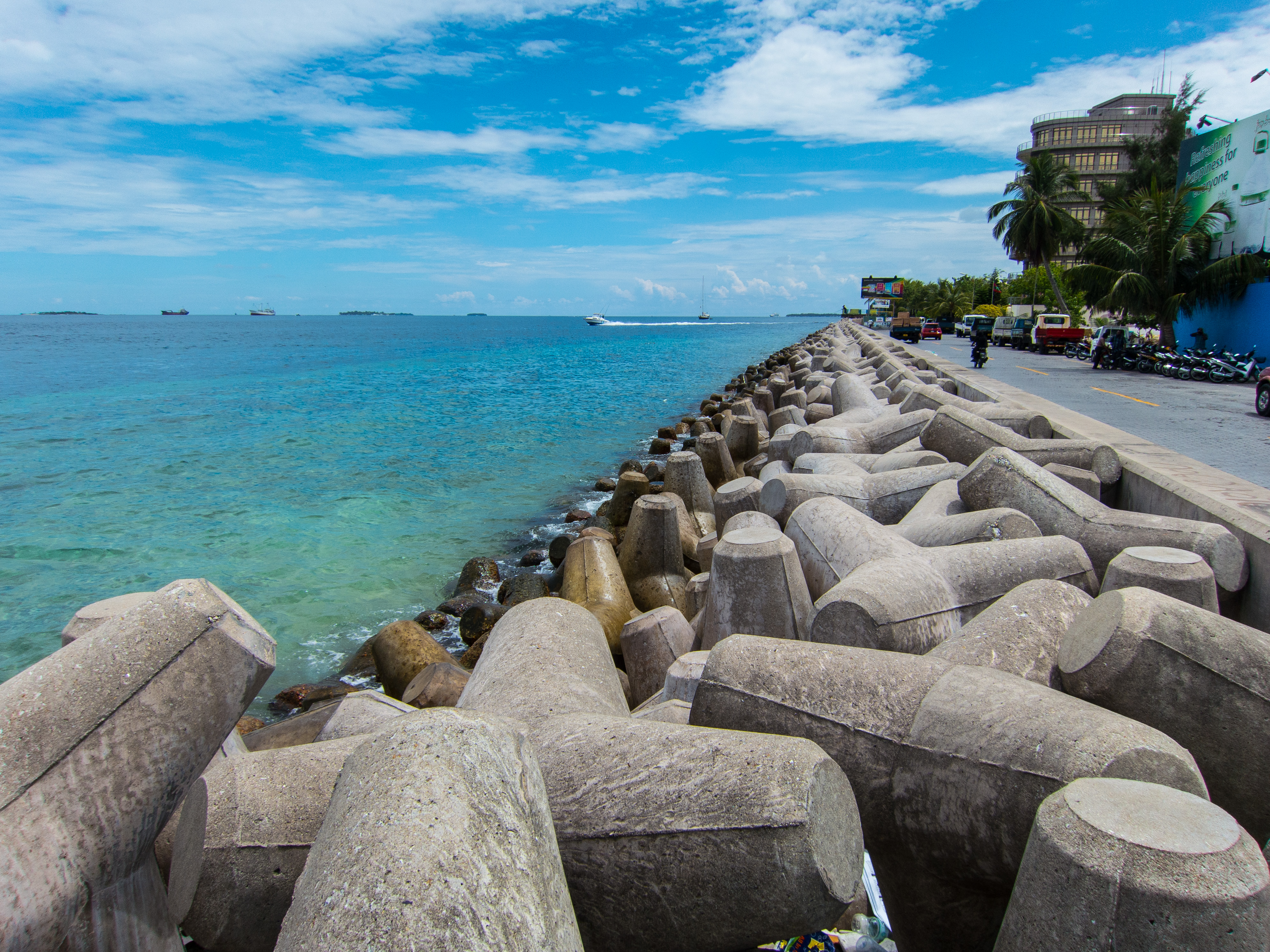
Breakwater on the western coast of Malé. This structure is effective to protect low-altitude areas from storm tide and tsunami.

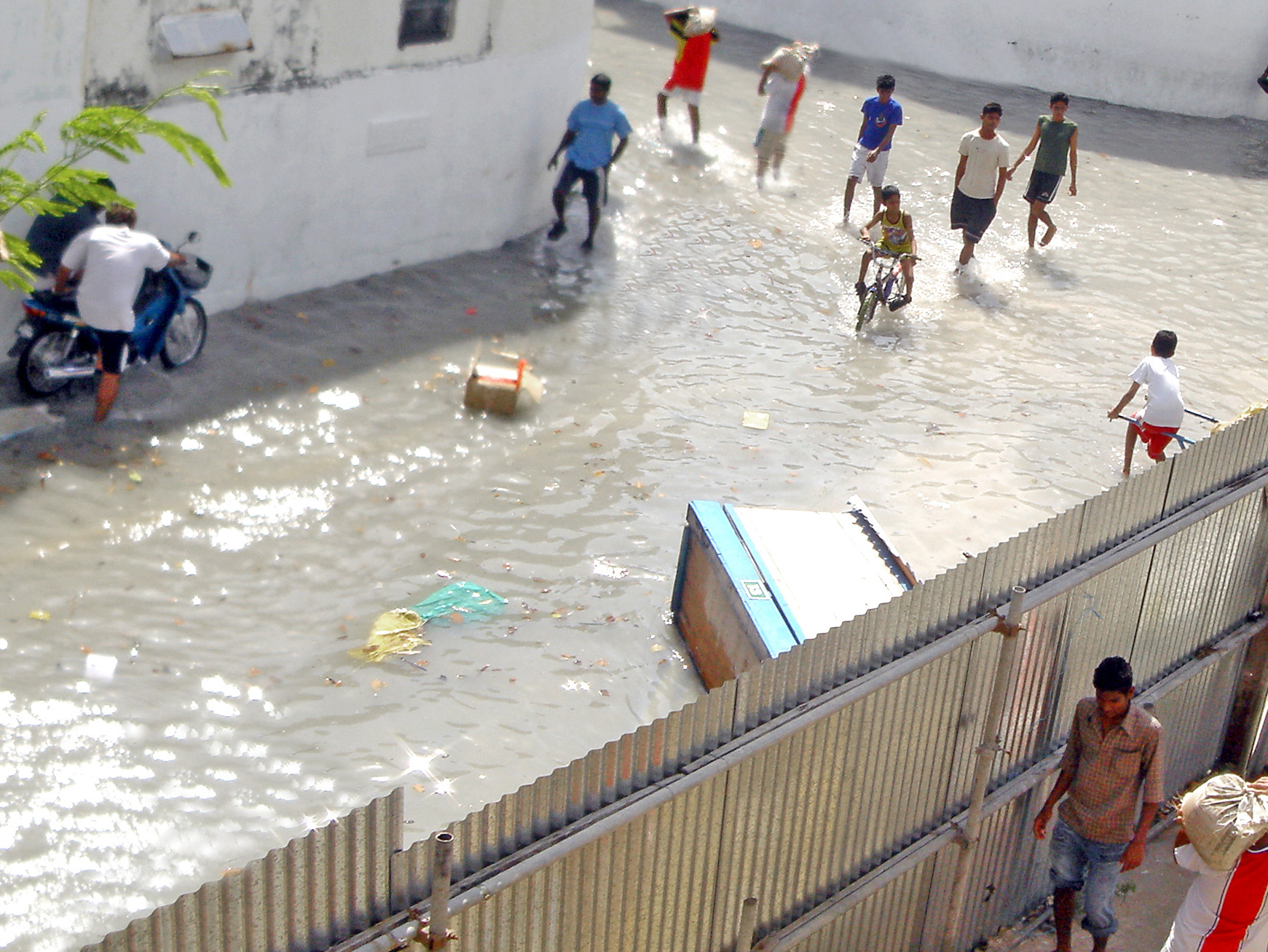
Malé after the tsunami caused by the 2004 Indian Ocean earthquake.

In 1987, a massive storm surge hit and flooded a large part of the Maldives. The devastating surge wielded a strong influence on this island country in the Indian Ocean, particularly the infrastructure in Malé was paralyzed and damaged at an estimated cost of U.S.$6 million. GDP of the Maldives, afterwards, decreased 5.70% in this year compared to the previous one, or from U.S.$158 million in 1986 to U.S.$149 million in 1987. Malé instantly requested Tokyo for the emergency assistance and an aid in preventing disaster like the storm surge, and Japanese government accepted it. A coastal protection project supported by Japan' ODA soon began within the year, and it continued until 2002 when completed the six kilometers long barrier all the way around the capital.

Just two years after this project was consummated, in 2004, a massive undersea earthquake of magnitude 9.1 or more occurred and tsunami attacked the western part of the Pacific Ocean and almost every coastal area of the Indian Ocean including the Maldives. This enormous tsunami killed 230,000–280,000 people in Sri Lanka, India, Thailand, Malaysia, Madagascar, Somalia, Kenya, Tanzania, South Africa, and the Maldives outside Malé Island. Nevertheless, in the Maldives, the anti-tsunami barrier built by collaboration between both of the island countries, protected those who lived in Malé without any deaths.

== Support during the Great East Japan Earthquake ==
Following the Great East Japan Earthquake on March 11, 2011, the Maldivian government decided to provide tuna cans as relief supplies. It was judged that the canned food was suitable for long-term storage and was suitable for relief supplies, and the government provided 86,400 pieces. In addition, support campaigns were held on Television and radio, and citizens donated 7 million rufiyaa and about 600,000 cans of tuna. The canned goods brought in were once picked up by a domestic processor so that they could be opened without a can opener, soaked in oil, refilled in pull-top cans, and then sent to Japan.

== See also ==
- Foreign relations of Japan
- Foreign relations of the Maldives
