= Ahmed Khaleel =

Maldivian diplomat (born 1962)

- އަހްމަދު ޚަލީލް
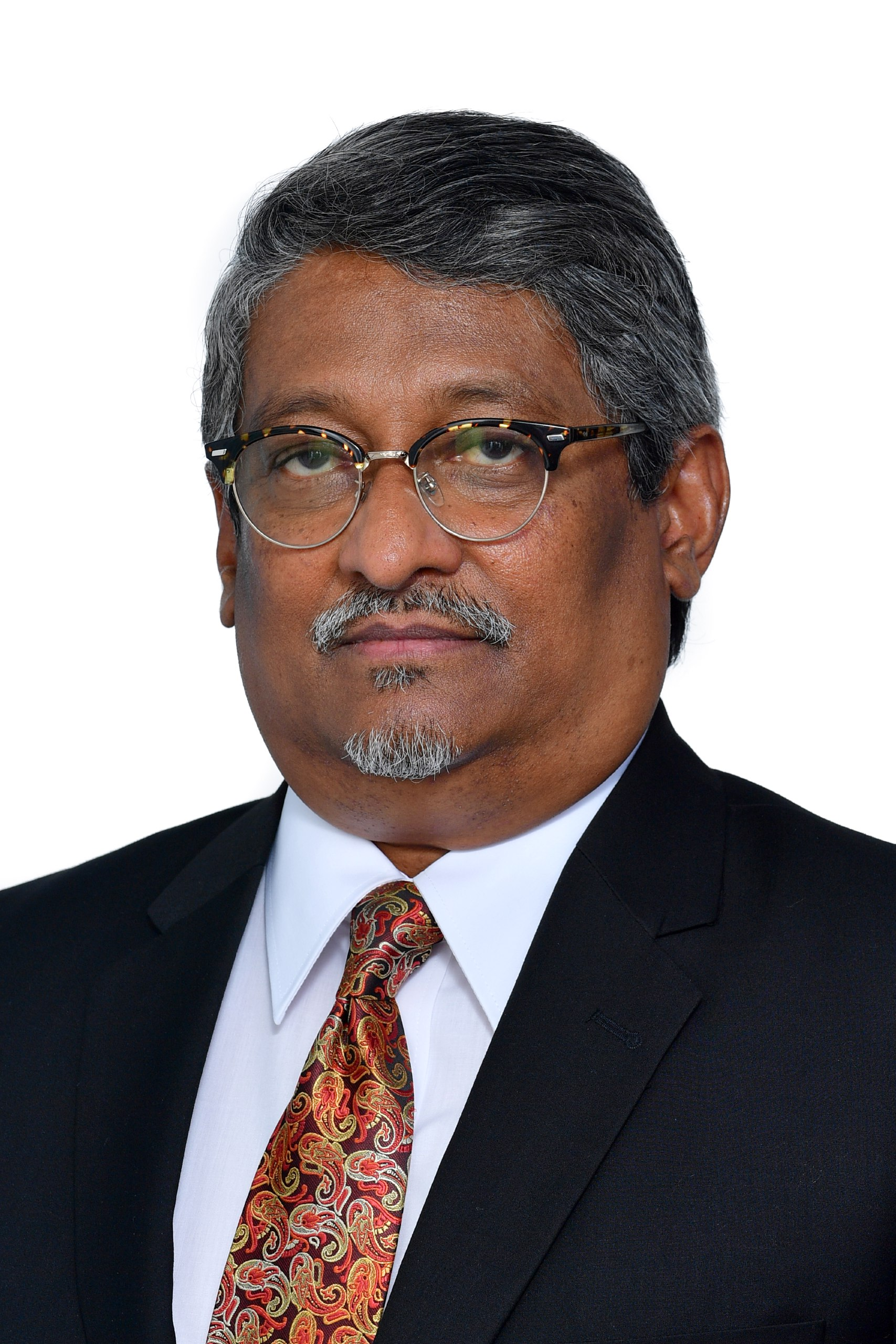
- Official portrait, 2018

Minister of State for Foreign Affairs
- In office 22 November 2018 – 17 November 2023
- President: Ibrahim Mohamed Solih

Non-Resident Ambassador to the Republic of Korea
- In office 18 April 2013 – 30 September 2016
- President: Abdulla Yameen
- Succeeded by: Mohamed Jinah

Ambassador of the Maldives to Japan
- In office 9 December 2009 – 30 September 2016
- President: Mohamed Nasheed; Mohamed Waheed Hassan; Abdulla Yameen
- Succeeded by: Mohamed Hussain Shareef

Permanent Representative of the Maldives to the United Nations
- In office 2007–2008
- President: Maumoon Abdul Gayoom; Mohamed Nasheed
- Preceded by: Mohamed Latheef
- Succeeded by: Abdul Ghafoor Mohamed

Personal details
- Born: 17 March 1962 (age 64)
- Education: Majeediyya School

Ahmed Khaleel (Dhivehi: އަހްމަދު ޚަލީލް; born 17 March 1962) is a Maldivian diplomat who served as the Minister of State for Foreign Affairs from 2018 to 2023.

Khaleel previously served as the permanent representative of the Maldives to the United Nations from 2007 to 2008. Additionally, he was the Ambassador of the Maldives to Japan from 2010 and the non-resident ambassador to South Korea from 2013, serving both posts until 2016. He served as the Under-Secretary for Bilateral Relations at the Ministry of Foreign Affairs during 2016–2018, before becoming the Minister of State for Foreign Affairs in November 2018.

== Diplomatic career ==
He joined the Ministry of Foreign Affairs in 1981 and first worked at the Immigration Bureau for about six months, then worked at the Office of the High Commission in Sri Lanka, where he was the third secretary.

From October 1983 to June 1984, He completed a Foreign Service Training Programme in Islamabad, the capital of Pakistan. From October 1991 to June 1992, he also completed a Diplomat Training Programme at Oxford University in England.

From 2006 to 2007, he served as Chargé d'Affaires of the Maldives to Japan and he was involved in the opening of the embassy, and then from 2007 to 2008 as an Ambassador to the United Nations.

Khaleel was appointed as the Additional Secretary by President Mohamed Nasheed in 2009.

Khaleel was appointed as the Ambassador of the Maldives to Japan in 2009 by President Mohamed Nasheed. He presented his letter of credence to Emperor Akihito at the Tokyo Imperial Palace in 2010.

On 11 March 2011, during Khaleel's third year as Ambassador to Japan, the Great East Japan Earthquake occurred, causing extensive damage mainly on the Pacific coast of the Tōhoku region. From August 26 to 27 of the same year, he engaged in relief activities in Ishinomaki City, Miyagi Prefecture, the disaster-stricken area, together with Yoshitaka Shindo, a member of the House of Representatives who was then the secretary-general of the Japan-Maldives Friendship Parliamentary League. (This was the first time that Khaleel accompanied Japan.)

On 18 April 2013, he presented his letter of credence as the non-resident ambassador of the Maldives to South Korea to South Korean President Park Geun-hye at the Blue House.

On 30 September 2016, Khaleel stopped being the Maldivian ambassador to Japan and the non-resident ambassador to South Korea.

On 10 October 2016, Khaleel was appointed as the Secretary, Bilateral at the Ministry of Foreign Affairs by President Abdulla Yameen. On 14 June 2018, he participated in the first Japan-Maldives Policy Dialogue which was held in Tokyo as Vice-Minister for Bilateral Relations and exchanged opinions with Nariki Takizaki, the Director of Southern Asia, and others.

On 22 November 2018, he was appointed Minister of State for Foreign Affairs. On 27 August 2019, he participated in the 2nd Japan-Maldives Policy Dialogue held in Malé and exchanged opinions with Shigeki Takizaki, the Director of Southeast and Southwest Asian affairs department. On 4 March 2021, he participated in the 3rd Japan-Maldives Policy Dialogue held in and online video conference format as Minister of State for Foreign Affairs and exchanged opinions with Kenichi Kobayashi, the Director-General of Southeast and Southwest Asian Affairs department.

On 4 October 2021, Khaleel signed and exchanged letters with Keiko Yanai, Ambassador of Japan to the Maldives, in Malé regarding the Economic and Social Development Plan, a grant aid with a maximum of ¥400,000,000. On 30 May 2022, a letter was signed and exchanged with Midori Takeuchi, Ambassador of Japan to the Maldives, in Malé regarding the "Economic and Social Development Plan" 650 million yen grant aid.

On 27 September 2022, Khaleel attended the Funeral of Shinzo Abe along with Foreign Minister Abdulla Shahid, Maldivian ambassador to Japan Hassan Sobir, and Deputy Ambassador Mohammad Ameetou Ahmed Manik.

On 4 April 2023, he participated in the 4th Japan-Maldives Policy Dialogue held in Tokyo as Minister of State for Foreign Affairs and exchanged opinions with Yutaka Arima, Director of Southeast and Southwest Asian Affairs department.

== Awards and Honours ==
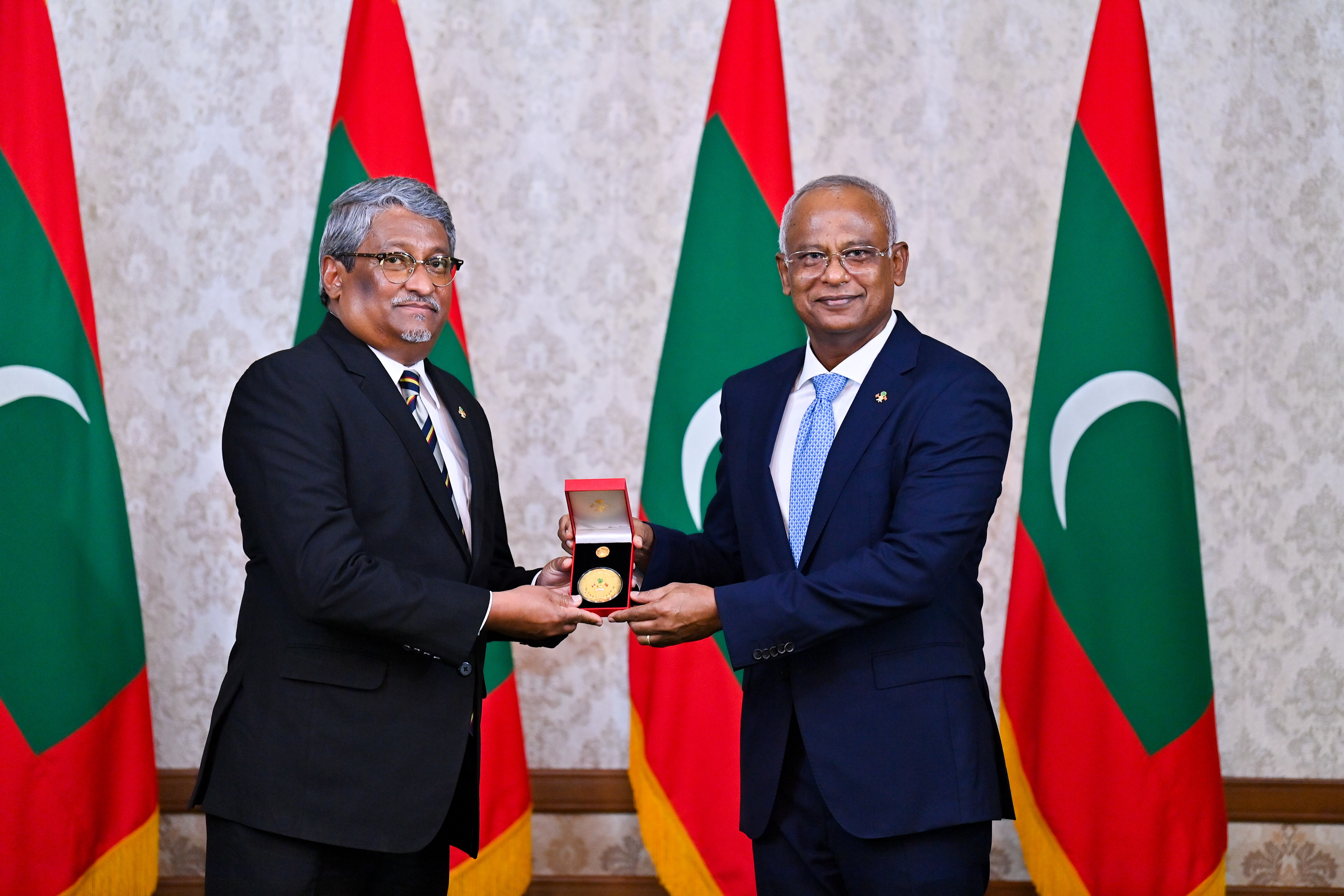
President Ibrahim Mohamed Solih awarding Khaleel the Foreign Service Medal

In November 2023, President Ibrahim Mohamed Solih awarded Khaleel the Most Distinguished Foreign Service Medal.

In 2024, the Japanese government awarded Khaleel with the Order of the Rising Sun, Gold and Silver Star, by Emperor Naruhito.

- Order of the Rising Sun, 2nd Class, Gold and Silver Star (2024)

Political offices
Preceded by Aslam Shakir	Maldives Minister of State for Foreign Affairs; 2018–2023	Succeeded by Mohamed Shahudy
Preceded by Vacant	Maldives Undersecretary for Bilateral Relations; 2016–2018	Succeeded by Vacant
Preceded by First Ambassador	Maldives Ambassador to South Korea; 2013–2016 (Resident in Tokyo); 2016–2023 (Resident in Malé)	Succeeded by Hassan Sobir (Resident in Tokyo)
Preceded by Abdul Hameed Zakariyya	Maldives Ambassador to Japan; 2009–2016	Succeeded by Mohamed Hussain Shareef
Preceded by Mohamed Latheef	Maldives Ambassador to UN (United Nations); 2007–2009	Succeeded by Abdul Ghafoor Mohamed
