= Khalil Ahmed (disambiguation) =

Khalil Ahmed (1936–1997) was a Pakistani film composer.

Khalil Ahmed or Ahmad may also refer to:

- Khalil Ahmad (basketball) (born 1996), American basketball player
- Khalil Ahmad (politician) (c. 1956–2024), Pakistani politician
- Khalil Ahmed (cricketer) (born 2004), Afghan cricketer
- Khaleel Ahmed (born 1997), Indian cricketer
- Khaleel Ahmed (judge) (born 1907), Indian judge
- Bano Khalil Ahmed (born 1969), Pakistani politician

== See also ==
- Ahmed Khalil (disambiguation)
