= Makunudhoo (Haa Dhaalu Atoll) =

- Inhabited island
- މަކުނުދޫ
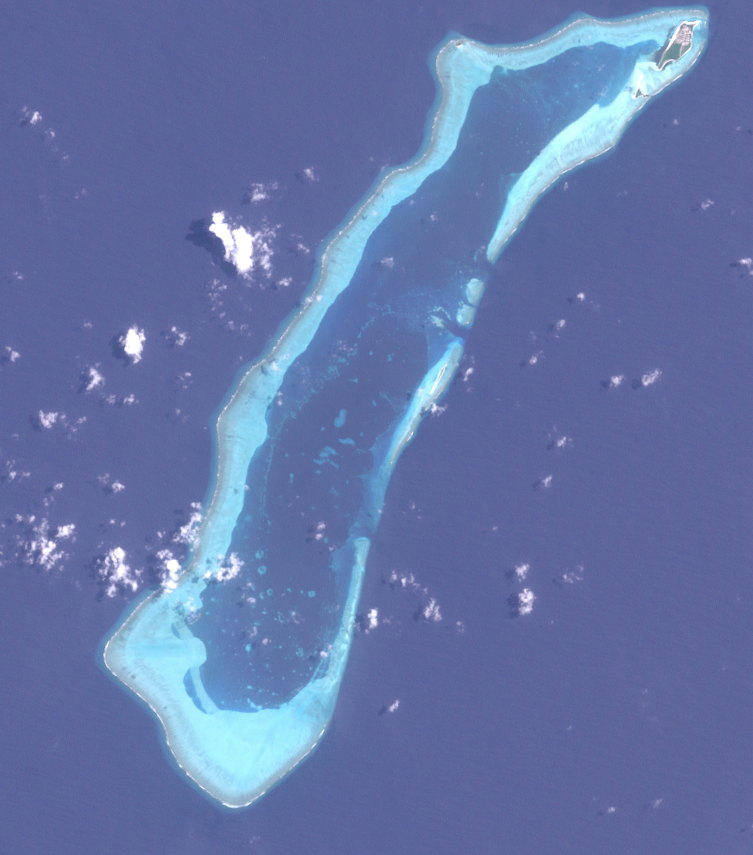
- Aerial view of Mamakunudhoo atoll

- Location in Maldives
- Coordinates: 06°24′24″N 72°42′20″E
- Country: Maldives
- Geographic atoll: Māmakunudhoo Atoll
- Administrative atoll: Haa Dhaalu Atoll
- Distance to Malé: 262.33 km (163.00 mi)

Dimensions
  - Length: 2.94 km (1.83 mi)
  - Width: 1.4 km (0.87 mi)

Population (2022)
  - Total: 1,265
- Time zone: UTC+05:00 (MST)

Makunudhoo (Dhivehi: މަކުނުދޫ) is one of the inhabited islands of Haa Dhaalu Atoll administrative division and geographically part of Māmakunudhoo Atoll (Malcolm Atoll) in the north of the Maldives. It is the westernmost inhabited island in the Maldives.

== History ==
Historically, several ships have been wrecked on the treacherous reefs surrounding the island. The most famous wreck was that of the English spice ship Hayston on 20 July 1819. Several tons of cloves were salvaged and later distributed to the military and aristocrats in Male'. Makunudhoo is also famous as the island where Vazir Ibrahim Famuladeyri Takurufaanu who plotted to assassinate Sultan Muhammed Ghiya'as ud-din was exiled to in 1767. However along with other plotters of the assassination he escaped to Chandannagar where they got protection from the French governor Monsieur Le Termellier. Sultan Giyasudeen sent a number of gifts and a letter to the governor of Sri Lanka and asked him to arrest the men and return them to Maldives. The governor ignored this request.

== Geography ==
The island is 262.33 km (163 mi; 142 nmi) north of the country's capital, Malé.

=== Malcolm Atoll ===
This island is the only inhabited island in Māmakunudhoo or Makunudhoo Atoll (Malcolm Atoll in the Admiralty Chart). This atoll has a large reef with lagoon, 15 miles long by only 3 miles broad. It has only one inhabited island and a small islet and it lies 10 miles west of the NW part of the Miladhummadulhu group. It is said to have been unknown to non-Maldivians previous to the 1834-36 survey of the Maldives. According to the locals, many ships have been lost on its barren reefs with crew, cargo and all, scarcely a vestige of the wrecks remaining after a few hours, from the violence of the surf and the perpendicular sides of the reef. The lagoon is deep but full of coral patches (giri).

In the Admiralty Chart this atoll is named after Sir Charles Malcolm, commander of the Bombay Marine (renamed the Indian Navy in 1832). Malcolm had the vision to introduce steam navigation to the Red Sea, which would enable boats to navigate up the Gulf of Suez. He was instrumental in making sure that the surveys conducted by Commander Robert Moresby in the Maldives took place.

==== Maritime Observatory ====
The atoll is the proposed site of the Joint Ocean Observation Station, a maritime observatory being developed by the State Oceanic Administration of China.

== Demography ==
Historical population
Year	Pop.	±%
2006	1,045	—
2014	1,213	+16.1%
2022	1,265	+4.3%
2006-2014-2022: Census populations Source:
