= Fazeel Najeeb =

Ambassador of the Maldives to China since 2024

- ފަޒީލް ނަޖީބް
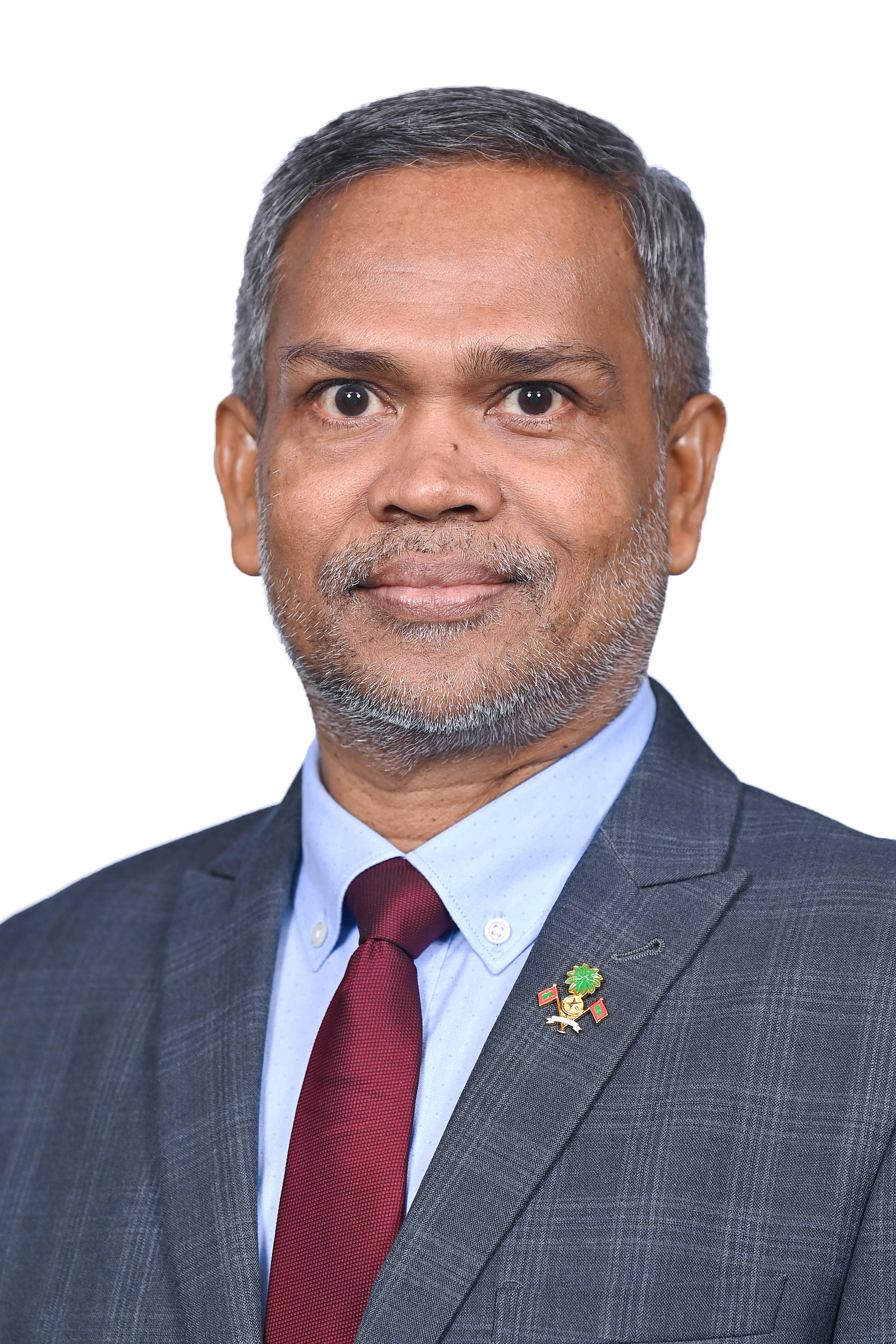
- Official portrait, 2024

Ambassador of the Maldives to China
- Incumbent
- Assumed office 14 December 2024
- Appointed by: Mohamed Muizzu
- Preceded by: Huda Ali Shareef (Chargé d'affaires); Aishath Azeema

Minister of State for Foreign Affairs
- In office 20 September 2017 – 17 November 2018
- President: Abdulla Yameen
- Preceded by: Created
- Succeeded by: Ahmed Khaleel

Governor of Maldives Monetary Authority
- In office 22 October 2008 – 31 December 2013
- President: Maumoon Abdul Gayoom; Mohamed Nasheed; Mohamed Waheed Hassan; Abdulla Yameen
- Preceded by: Abdulla Jihad
- Succeeded by: Azeema Adam

Personal details
- Born: Fuvahmulah, Maldives
- Party: People's National Congress
- Relations: Abdulla Maseeh Mohamed (brother)

Fazeel Najeeb (Dhivehi: ފަޒީލް ނަޖީބް) is a Maldivian diplomat and economist who served as the ambassador of the Maldives to China since 2024. He previously served as the Governor of the Maldives Monetary Authority from 2008 to 2013 and was the chairman of the board of directors.

A native of Fuvahmulah, Fazeel was also the Governor of Maldives to the International Monetary Fund, and was Chairman of SAARC Finance, a network of Central Banks in South Asia.

== Early life and education ==
Najeeb is the younger brother of Abdulla Maseeh Mohamed.

Najeeb obtained a PhD in Commercial Law (Intellectual Property), an LLM in International Business Law, and a BA Honours degree in Economics. He acquired his education from the United Kingdom.

== Career ==
He began his public service in 1987 at the Ministry of Trade and Industry. He also had his own consulting firm, before taking up his doctoral studies in London.

In 2008, Najeeb was appointed by President Maumoon Abdul Gayoom as the governor of the Maldives Monetary Authority (MMA). In 2009 Najeeb introduced the first prudential regulations for banks in the Maldives – a set of 11 prudential regulations. In the same year he also proposed to the government, the first banking act of Maldives and introduced the first ever monetary policy framework and operations at the Central Bank, and, simultaneously introduced the auctioning of treasury bills. In 2013, he resigned.

In 2017, he was appointed as the State Minister of Foreign Affairs by President Abdulla Yameen.

In 2023, he announced his intent to run in the People's National Congress (PNC) primary for the South Fuvahmulah constitnecy to receive the party ticket for the 2024 parliamentary election. He later lost the primary.

In 2024, President Mohamed Muizzu nominated Najeeb as the Ambassador of the Maldives to China. The People's Majlis later approved Najeeb unanimously. He was later appointed in May by Muizzu and presented his letter of credence to President Xi Jinping in December.
