= List of high commissioners of the Maldives to India =

High Commissioner of the Republic of Maldives to the Republic of India
- Emblem of the Maldives

- Incumbent; Aishath Azeema since 30 October 2024
- Ministry of Foreign Affairs; High Commission of the Maldives, New Delhi
- Seat: New Delhi, India
- Appointer: President of the Maldives
- Term length: At the president's pleasure (typically 4–5 years)
- Inaugural holder: Ahmed Abdullah
- Formation: 30 June 1988

The High Commissioner of the Maldives to India, officially the High Commissioner of the Republic of Maldives to the Republic of India, is an officer of the Ministry of Foreign Affairs and the head of the High Commission of the Maldives in India. The high commissioner has the rank and status of an ambassador, and is currently held by Aishath Azeema since 30 October 2024. Since its establishment, there have been 8 high commissioners.

The post was established by president Maumoon Abdul Gayoom in June 1988, as a non-resident ambassador. Lieutenant General (retd.) Anbaree Abdul Sattar Adam served as the first ever resident ambassador of the Maldives to India, serving from November 2004 to June 2009.

== High commissioners ==
#	Officeholder	Portrait	Title	Term start	Term end	Ref
1	Ahmed Abdulla		Ambassador	30 June 1988	23 December 1996	
2	Abdul Azeez Yoosuf		Ambassador	23 December 1996	30 November 2004	
3	Abdul Sattar Adam		Ambassador	23 December 1996	30 November 2004	
4	Abdul Azeez Yoosuf		High Commissioner	30 November 2004	9 February 2012	
5	Mohamed Naseer		High Commissioner	9 May 2013	18 March 2015	
6	Ahmed Mohamed		High Commissioner	18 March 2015	18 December 2018	
7	Aishath Mohamed Didi		High Commissioner	8 February 2019	9 February 2020	
8	Ibrahim Shaheeb		High Commissioner	20 November 2022	30 October 2024	
9	Aishath Azeema		High Commissioner	30 October 2024	Incumbent	
