= List of ambassadors of the Maldives to China =

Maldivian ambassadors

Coordinates: 39.909432°N 116.438098°E

Ambassador of Maldives to China
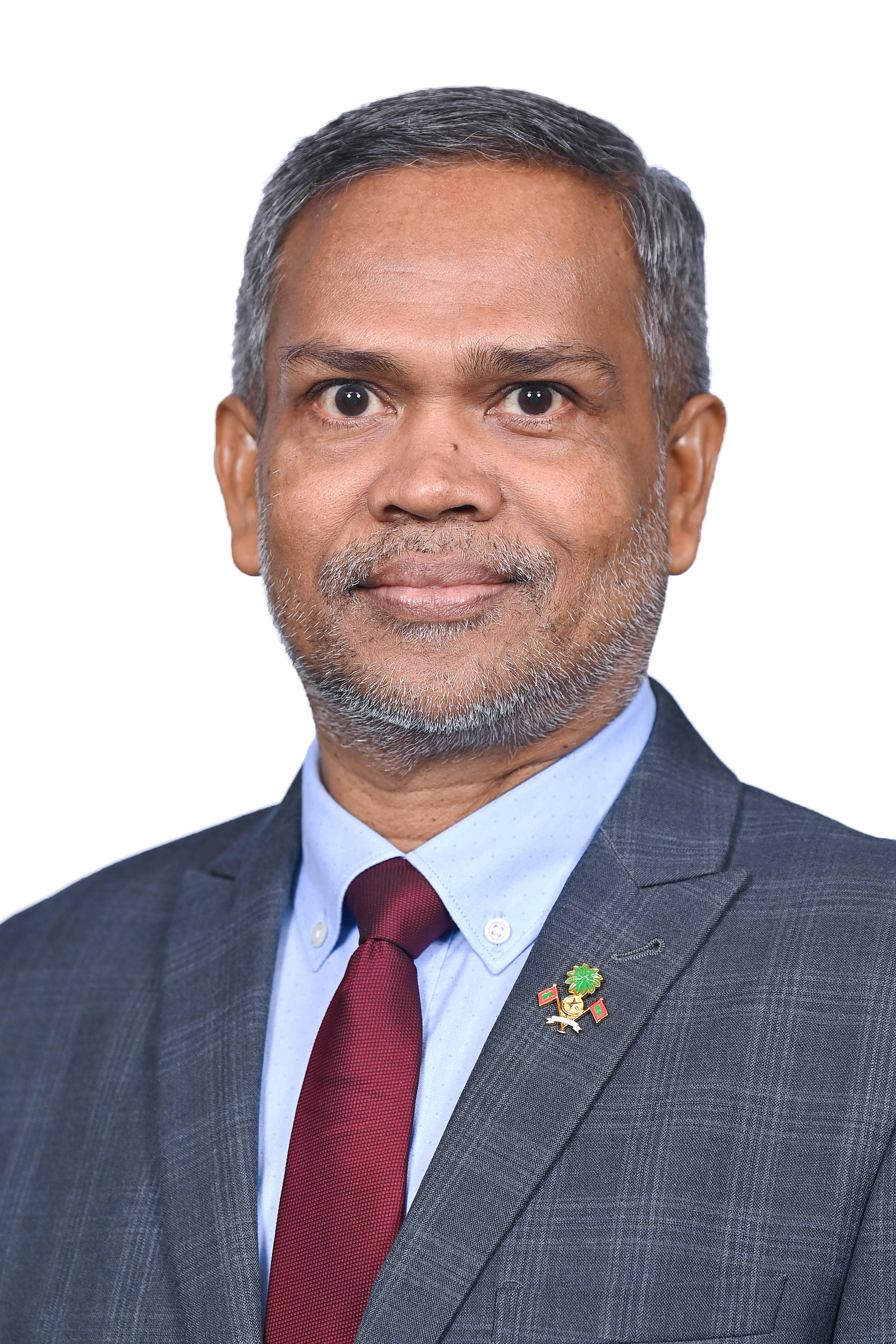
- Incumbent; Fazeel Najeeb since 14 December 2024
- Appointer: The president
- Inaugural holder: Ahmed Latheef
- Formation: April 3, 2008

The Maldivian ambassador in Beijing is the official representative of the Government of the Maldives to the Government of the People's Republic of China.

== List of representatives ==
Diplomatic agrément/Diplomatic accreditation	Ambassador	Observations	President of the Maldives	Premier of the People's Republic of China	Term end
October 14, 1972		The governments in Beijing and Male established diplomatic relations.	Ibrahim Nasir	Zhou Enlai	
August 20, 2007		The government of the Maldives opened its embassy in Beijing.	Maumoon Abdul Gayoom	Wen Jiabao	
April 3, 2008	Ahmed Latheef		Maumoon Abdul Gayoom	Wen Jiabao	March 28, 2012
23 December 2012 / 17 January 2013	Mohamed Rasheed		Mohamed Waheed Hassan Manik	Zhu Rongji	March 30, 2014
January 26, 2016	Mohamed Faisal		Abdulla Yameen / Ibrahim Mohamed Solih	Li Keqiang	June 16, 2019
June 17, 2019/August 28, 2019	Aishath Azeema		Ibrahim Mohamed Solih	Li Keqiang	September 8, 2023
May 7, 2024	Fazeel Najeeb		Mohamed Muizzu	Li Qiang	
