= Joint Ocean Observation Station =

Planned maritime observatory

The Joint Ocean Observation Station was a planned maritime observatory to be built on Makunudhoo in the Maldives, to be operated by the State Oceanic Administration of China and the Ministry of Environment and Energy of the Maldives.

== History ==
The Government of India and oppositional Maldivian Democratic Party have argued that the observatory will be used for military applications by China. The Ministry of Foreign Affairs of the People's Republic of China has denied that the observatory will serve any military purpose. The observatory was scrapped in 2019.
