= Aishath Azeema =

Maldivian diplomat (born 1969)

- Official portrait, 2024

High Commissioner of the Maldives to India
- Incumbent
- Assumed office 17 February 2025
- President: Mohamed Muizzu
- Succeeded by: Ibrahim Shaheeb

Ambassador of the Maldives to China
- In office 28 August 2019 – 8 September 2023
- President: Ibrahim Mohamed Solih
- Preceded by: Mohamed Faisal
- Succeeded by: Huda Ali Shareef (chargé d’affaires); Fazeel Najeeb

Personal details
- Born: 10 April 1969 (age 57) Malé, Maldives
- Children: 2

Aishath Azeema (born 18 April 1969) is a Maldivian diplomat who is currently serving as the high commissioner of the Maldives to India and previously served as the Maldives' ambassador to China from 2019 to 2023.

== Career ==
After completing the GCE Ordinary Level, Azeema subsequently joined the Ministry of Foreign Affairs as a public servant in 1988. She worked in various departments, primarily the Department of External Resources and the Foreign Relations Department, at one point serving as English secretary at the ministry. For five years, she served as a minister-counsellor and head of chancery at the Maldivian Embassy in India, a close partner nation to the Maldives.

Having returned to serve as joint secretary in charge of the China and Japan Divisions in 2014, Azeema helped negotiate the Maldives' first bilateral free trade agreement, with China, which beginning with the presidency of Abdulla Yameen has become a major influence in the country. Then, after a stint as Chargé d'affaires or deputy secretary at the Maldivian Embassy in the United Kingdom, she was appointed ambassador to China in 2019. During her tenure, Azeema worked to build "enduring friendly ties" with Beijing. In the early stages of the COVID-19 pandemic, she oversaw government support to Maldivians in China. She completed her service as ambassador to China in September 2023.

In October 2024, President Mohamed Muizzu nominated Azeema to replace Ibrahim Shaheeb as high commissioner of the Maldives to India to the People's Majlis. The Foreign Relations Committee of the People's Majlis later unanimously approved Azeema as high commissioner. She was later appointed on 30 October 2024. Azeema later presented her letter of credence to Indian president Droupadi Murmu on 17 February 2025.
