= High Commission of the Maldives, Colombo =

Diplomatic mission of the Maldives in Colombo, Sri Lanka

- Location: Sri Lanka
- Address: 25 Melbourne Ave, Colombo
- Opened: 1934 (Representative Office); 1954 (Embassy); 1986 (High Commission)
- High Commissioner: Masood Imad
- Website: lk.mdvmission.gov.mv

The High Commission of the Maldives in Sri Lanka (Dhivehi: ސްރީލަންކާގައި ހުންނަ ދިވެހިރާއްޖޭގެ ހައިކޮމިޝަން) is an overseas embassy of the Maldives located in Colombo, the former capital and largest city in Sri Lanka.

== History ==
The history of the Maldives' overseas diplomatic mission in Colombo, dates back to 1934, when the Maldives was a British protectorate and Sri Lanka was part of British Ceylon. On 4 March 1934, the Representative Office of the Maldives in Colombo was opened in the capital of British Ceylon with the first representative being Abdul Hameed Didi.

On 4 February 1948, Ceylon gained independence from Britain. In 1954, the Representative Office in Colombo, the capital of Ceylon, was elevated to the Embassy of the Maldives in Ceylon. The first ambassador was Mohamed Zaki, who served from 11 March 1954 – 7 May 1955.

On 26 July 1965, the Maldives became independent, and on the same day, relations between Sri Lanka and the Maldives were established. The United Kingdom and Ceylon were the only two countries to establish diplomatic relations with the Maldives on the same day of independence, which was earlier than the neighboring regional power India and the two great powers of the time, the United States and the Soviet Union.

On 23 May 1972, Ceylon changed its name to Sri Lanka. As a result, it became the Embassy of the Maldives in Sri Lanka (Dhivehi: ސްރީލަންކާގައި ހުންނަ ދިވެހިރާއްޖޭގެ އެމްބަސީ).

The Maldives Embassy in Colombo was closed in 1976 during the Ibrahim Nasir administration, but it was reopened in 1979 during the Maumoon Abdul Gayoom administration.

On 11 February 1985, the capital of Sri Lanka was moved from Colombo to Sri Jayewardenepura Kotte. However, the Maldives High Commission remains located in the former capital, Colombo.

On 15 November 1986, the Embassy was replaced by the Office of the High Commission of the Maldives in Sri Lanka. Abdul Azeez Yoosuf, who had previously served as a counsellor in Colombo, served as the first High Commissioner from November 15, 1986, to November 11, 1993.

In October 2016, when the Maldives withdrew from the Commonwealth of Nations, the overseas mission became the Embassy of the Maldives in Sri Lanka again, but on 1 February 2020, when the Maldives returned to its status as a republic in the Commonwealth of Nations, It was reverted to the High Commission of the Maldives, Colombo.

== High Commissioner ==
Ali Faiz, who has been serving as the High Commissioner of Maldives to Sri Lanka was appointed in January 2023.

== See also ==
- Maldives–Sri Lanka relations
